= Dead Alewives =

Improvisational comedy troupe

The Dead Alewives was an improvisational comedy troupe during the 1980s and 1990s from Milwaukee. Some of the group's individual members went on to become noteworthy after the group's breakup.

The Dead Alewives began as a splinter group from the Milwaukee-based national comedy organization ComedySportz. The split occurred out of a desire to do a less family-oriented, more uncensored style of improv than the "clean" variety offered by ComedySportz. The group took its name from the local phenomenon of multitudes of dead alewife fish washing up on the shore of Lake Michigan during summers in the mid-1980s. Its shows featured music from local bands during their set breaks.

The Dead Alewives began performing in the ComedySportz theater space in Milwaukee's Third Ward district. They appeared on several theaters in the Milwaukee area during their existence. Other venues that played host to their shows included Thai Joe's, The Avalon Theatre, and the Miramar Theatre, which is where they wound up their weekly live shows in the late 1990s.

The Dead Alewives ceased their weekly live performances in the late 1990s, and the individual members all pursued other interests.

== Founding members ==
- Francis Montgomery "Mondy" Carter was a founding member of the troupe. He lived in Milwaukee for many years and worked as an actor in the city's live theater industry. He moved with his family to Asheville, North Carolina where he hoped to continue to work on theater projects with his wife, Karen Stobbe.
- Robert "Bo" Johnson lives in Milwaukee, and works in theaters in the area. He plays rhythm guitar with Milwaukee-based pop band Random Maxx.
- Peter Alberts was a staff member of Fireman Press, the self-contained publishing house that produced the independent comic book Scud: The Disposable Assassin. He lives in Los Angeles.
- Rob Schrab. In addition to his tenure with the Dead Alewives, Schrab is an artist and writer of comic books and graphic novels, including Scud: The Disposable Assassin. When the Dead Alewives folded, Schrab moved to Los Angeles to pursue a pending movie deal for his comic characters. Among his achievements are co-writing the animated film Monster House with Dan Harmon; producing The Sarah Silverman Program on Comedy Central; writing and producing the unpurchased (but virally reproduced) cult pilot Heat Vision and Jack (also with Harmon); and creating Internet "TV channel" Channel 101, which features user-submitted content.
- Dan Harmon became a Dead Alewife at the same time as Schrab, both having trained under Scholler and Johnson. Harmon was the creator and writer of several Dead Alewives recordings that found some viral Internet success, such as "Dungeons and Dragons" sketch, also known as "Summoner Geeks". In the late 1990s, he moved to Los Angeles with Schrab, where the two launched a career as screenwriting partners. Harmon was the producer, writer, and star of Acceptable.TV on VH1, as well as the creator of the TV series Community and the co-creator of Rick and Morty.
- Sean McKenna was a founding member. After the Alewives ceased their live performances, he moved to the Twin Cities to continue his theatrical career, where he became the voice of the Best Buy Idea Box on television commercials and also provided the voice for the titular character in Schrab's Robot Bastard short. Sean became a copywriter and works at an ad agency. He has two children.
- Kurt Scholler taught improv classes in Milwaukee while living there, and appeared in a number of television ads for the Cousins sandwich restaurant chain, Capital One, and Campbell's Soup. In addition, he has appeared in small roles on a number of television shows, including Kwik Witz, Boston Legal, and The West Wing. Scholler performed the physical role of the robot in Schrab's Robot Bastard short. Still performing with ComedySportz in Los Angeles, Scholler continues to do commercials, film, and television, including a brief cameo on The Sarah Silverman Program.

=== Other Dead Alewives ===
- Dylan Bolin is a Milwaukee-based comedian and improv artist who joined the troupe after the departure of some of the original members.
- Tom Clark is an actor and a stand-up comedian. He lives in Los Angeles and has acted on such shows as TNT's The Closer, NBC's Outsourced and The Hallmark Movie The Wish List. He has also appeared in Universal Pictures Big Miracle and Columbia Pictures Freaks of Nature. He has done stand up on TBS's Conan, Comedy Central's Premium Blend and CBS's The Late Late Show. He, too, joined after the departure of some of the founding members.
- Mark Redlich worked with the Dead Alewives and ComedySportz while finishing his Ph.D. in organic chemistry. He lives in Milwaukee, where he works as a chemical analyst, and plays lead guitar in Random Maxx with Bo Johnson. Redlich is still active with ComedySportz.
- Eric Price is a comedian and impressionist who did several shows with the Dead Alewives in the stead of the departed founders. Price was a featured performer on MADtv.
- Rollie Cafaro is a Milwaukee-area attorney and veteran of ComedySportz who filled in for absent members during a number of shows.
