= House of Cosbys =

2005 American animated sitcom

- Intertitle
- Genre: Comic science fiction
- Created by: Justin Roiland
- Voices of: Jeff Davis; Justin Roiland
- Theme music composer: Nick Haas, Matias Drago, Amy Metcalf, Justin Roiland
- Composer: Glenn Morrissette
- Country of origin: United States
- Original language: English
- No. of seasons: 1
- No. of episodes: 4

Production
- Producer: Abed Gheith

Original release
- Network: Channel 101
- Release: January 30 – June 26, 2005

Related
- Rick and Morty; Acceptable TV

House of Cosbys is an American animated sitcom created by Justin Roiland for the film festival Channel 101. The series centers on Mitchell Reynolds (Jeff Davis), who builds a cloning machine to make duplicates of his favorite comedian, Bill Cosby. The show stars Davis, Roiland, and a rotating cast of performers, many of whom were participants at Channel 101. The series premiered January 30, 2005, and was the number one-rated program on the site for three months. Four episodes of the series were created, which debuted at Channel 101 screenings and were posted online thereafter. The series concluded on June 26, 2005 with an "unofficial" fifth installment.

The series garnered media attention when lawyers for Cosby sent Roiland and site administrator Dan Harmon a cease and desist letter in June 2005, which resulted in the series' ending.

== Plot ==
The series revolves around Mitchell Reynolds (Davis), a fan of comedian Bill Cosby who, using one of Cosby's hairs, spends a decade crafting a cloning machine to create his dream: a "house of Cosbys". Each duplicate contains random and mild attributes, such as curiosity and dancing. He then begins cloning several more Cosbys to help him around the house, much like in the plot of the 1996 film Multiplicity. However, the quality of the clones seems to deteriorate as the process is repeated, and he decides to stop using the machine; but when one of the clones subversively activates it, he discovers that every tenth Cosby he clones has super powers. At the suggestion of Data Analysis Cosby (the first super-powered Cosby) they decide to continue cloning Cosbys so that their super powers can be used to help the world.

Many participants of Channel 101 gave voices to the series, including Rob Schrab, Steve Agee, and all three members of The Lonely Island.

== Characters ==
The following is a list of the Cosby clones;

Number	Name	Voiced by	Powers/notable traits
1	Entertainment Cosby	Rob Schrab	Was the first Cosby clone. Closest to the real Bill Cosby in personality and physical attributes.
2	House Keeping Cosby	Steve Agee	An excellent duster.
3	Moral Support Cosby	Rob Schrab	Treats Mitchell as his son.
4	Tattle Tale Cosby	Scott Chernoff	Tattles on others.
5	Dancing Cosby	Bennet Webber	Dances all the time.
6	Bath Tub Cosby	Scott Chernoff	This Cosby never leaves the bath tub.
7	Useless Cosby	Chester Tam	Does nothing but stand around, though he eventually speaks to Bath Tub Cosby.
8	Curiosity Cosby	Justin Roiland	This extremely curious clone likes to explore and find things, which causes trouble on multiple occasions. Dies at the end of episode 3.
9	Butt Naked Cosby	Abed Gheith	He plays with fire.
10	Data Analysis Cosby	Justin Roiland	Super-intelligence and data analysis.
12	White Cosby	none	He is a caucasian Cosby clone.
20	Carpentry Cosby	none	The ability to create amazing feats of carpentry, as he built the additional barracks and probably most of the buildings in the training facility.
22	Suburban Life Cosby	none	This Cosby views the cloning of Cosbyette. He wears the garb of a true family man.
26	Art Appreciation Cosby	none	Loves art.
30	Weapons Cosby	none	His super power would appear to be the production and use of weapons, particularly guns.
40	Country Music Cosby	none	His super power is being a good country music player.
41	Mechanics Cosby	none	This Cosby is a mechanic, and he does all the machine work around the compound.
47	Mood Swing Cosby	Tim Heidecker	This Cosby has extreme emotional highs and lows. Presumed dead, as he accidentally hangs himself after being convinced not to commit suicide.
50	BC-D2	Abed Gheith	A parody of R2-D2, he is a small, apparently cyborg Cosby who follows Data Analysis Cosby around and communicates by a series of "blips" and "bloo"s.
60	Cosbyette	Stephanie Bilberry	Her most obvious super power is the fact that she is female (with a well proportioned body) but she has also exhibited psychic powers (sensing trouble in the compound).
61	Preacher Cosby	Justin Roiland	Provides spiritual comfort, for example talking one out of suicide.
70	Toothpaste Cosby	Akiva Schaffer	One of the members of Cosby Team Triosby, he has the power to turn into Toothpaste and seep through small gaps, or make things trip.
80	Frequency Cosby	Jorma Taccone	One of the members of Cosby Team Triosby, he can absorb TV and Radio waves and turn them into harmful electric blasts.
85	April Fool's Cosby	Bennett Webber	The desire to play April Fools jokes.
90	Humming Bird Cosby	Andy Samberg	One of the members of Cosby Team Triosby, he can fly and hover like a humming bird, and also create small explosives in his stomach which he can then defecate on land-based targets.
100	Evil Cosby	Abed Gheith	His super powers are unknown, although being "evil" would appear to be one of them.
???	Droopy Cosby	Abed Gheith	This Cosby most likely isn't a super Cosby, however his number is unknown. He is a depressed Cosby.
???	Scared Cosby	none	This Cosby is shaking with fear in the corner of the room Curiosity Cosby was dismembered in. His number is unknown.
???	Transgender Cosby	none	Is dressed in drag, and also appears to be white. Her number is unknown.

Other characters:

Name	Voiced by	Synopsis
Mitchell Reynolds	Jeff Davis	He is the creator of the Cosbys.
Alien 1	Justin Roiland	A yellow, dragon-like alien that attacked the Cosby Compound. He communicates in "yeps" and "uh-huhs".
Alien 2	???	A green, dragon-like alien who is partners with Alien 1.
Alien Game Show Host	???	A turquoise alien who hosts a game show.
?Homo?	???	A big-headed, purple alien who was a competitor in the alien game show. He was killed by a gnome with a machine-gun when he got a question wrong.
Unicorn Alien	Nobody	A unicorn-like alien who was a competitor in the alien game show.
Moro	???	A big, fleshy looking alien who has a TV show with Toro. It is very similar to "Terrance and Phillip" from South Park.
Toro	???	A big, pea-green coloured alien who has a TV show with Moro.
Alien News Reporter	???	A raisin-headed alien who hosts the news.
Joyce	???	An alien with her brain on the outside of her head. She speaks in creepy whispers.
Alien Singer	???	A singer who loves the Xacoflaxians and their god, Jibbody Libbody.
Jibbody Libbody	???	A giant toad in royal clothes. He is the god of the Xacoflaxians.
? Will ?	???	A pea-green alien who is lost. All his friends are trapped inside the rectum (or as they call it, the "greasy asshole") of a red alien who looks exactly like them but about three times the size of them.

== History ==
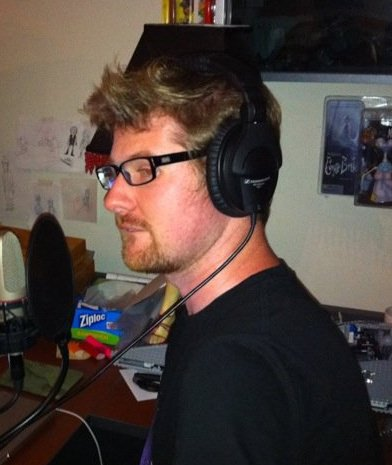
Justin Roiland, the series' creator, in 2010

Justin Roiland first began working in television in the early 2000s, mainly producing reality television programs. He and his close friends, Sevan Najarian and Abed Gheith, were more interested in creating comedic short films, and would work on them at his apartment in spare time. In 2003, they began submitting their projects to Channel 101, a non-profit monthly short film festival in Los Angeles, in which participants submit a short film in the format of a pilot under five minutes in length. After submitting several films, he began working on House of Cosbys, which originated between him, Gheith, and another close friend Steven Chunn, doing poor impressions of Bill Cosby. While the original idea was similar in setup to the sitcom The Brady Bunch—consisting of multiple Cosbys together in a home—it eventually evolved into its final form with more development. Roiland deemed the concept "Multiplicity meets The Smurfs meets the original concept."

He wrote the first episode and began working on it alongside Gheith, Najarian, and Chunn. Roiland and Chunn would design and draw characters and scan them into a computer, where they could be further manipulated in Adobe Photoshop. From there, Najarian would digitally animate the drawings using Adobe After Effects. As the series progressed, he enlisted friends Myke Chilian to help with character design and background art, respectively. Roiland later likened it to "our own little animation studio." The first episode debuted at a screening on January 30, 2005, and received a wildly supportive reaction from the audience. Two more episodes were created over the following two months, where it remained the most popular show at each screening. By the fourth episode, Roiland fell ill with bronchitis, which resulted in what they felt was a subpar installment. Following this, a "perfect storm" of things helped lead to the ending of the series: Roiland had a close friend die in a car accident, which was "traumatizing" for him, he and his small team grew exhausted with making the series, and he and Channel 101's site administrator Dan Harmon received a cease and desist letter from Bill Cosby's attorney in June 2005:

Dear sirs,

we are lawyers for Mr. William H Cosby, Jr. We have just learned that you offer a deeply offensive animated film that you created, entitled House of Cosbys. [...] As you are certainly aware, none of you are licensed or in any way authorized to use Mr. Cosby's voice, name, or likeness. [...] Therefore, we demand that you immediately cease and desist from any use of our client's name, voice, and likeness, including the development and distribution of the House of Cosbys series.

Very truly yours,

John P. Schmitt

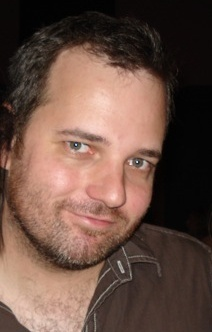
Dan Harmon at a Channel 101 screening in June 2007

Although he scripted a fifth installment of the series, a mockumentary about receiving the letter, he decided to end the series. Roiland attributed much of his reluctance to continue not on the prospect of potential legal action, but the passing of his friend. He gave the script to friends Chester Tam, and Chris Romano and Eric Falconer, who produced an "unofficial" fifth episode of House of Cosbys.

Despite no longer making the series, Cosby's lawyers insisted that the online distributors of the episodes—Channel101.com and Roiland's own site, ComicSacrifice.com—take them down. Harmon initially pulled the episodes from the site, but re-uploaded them shortly thereafter upon realizing their requests were unreasonable. He was forced to take them down when Cosby's lawyers went to the company that maintained the server for the site, CI Host. Harmon noted that the shorts were widely available on other video sites in a post on his site, commenting, "The actions of Cosby's legal team are somewhat laughable, somewhat sad and ultimately symbolic of a quantum shift in the business of entertainment." Blogger Andy Baio made the series available via his website, waxy.org, beginning in November 2005, though he was also sent a letter from Cosby's attorney the following March. "I'm sure he despised it, which is sort of sad because we're all fans," said Roiland at the time.

The series received media attention upon the cease and desist letter, which resulted in Roiland—then "an unemployed 23-year-old"—gaining a talent agent and being signed to the United Talent Agency.

== Episodes ==
=== Season 1 (2005) ===
No. overall	No. in season	Title	Directed by	Written by	Original release date
1	1	"Episode 1"	Justin Roiland	Justin Roiland and Sevan Najarian	January 30, 2005
Mitchell creates a House of Cosbys.
2	2	"Episode 2"	Justin Roiland	Justin Roiland and Sevan Najarian	February 28, 2005
The next generation of super Cosbys complete training at the Cosby compound.
3	3	"Episode 3"	Justin Roiland	Justin Roiland and Sevan Najarian	March 28, 2005
The Cosby compound falls under attack by aliens.
4	4	"Episode 4"	Justin Roiland	Justin Roiland and Sevan Najarian	April 24, 2005
Cosby 10 and Mitchell watch alien television.

=== "Unofficial" additional episodes ===
Before ending the series, Roiland enlisted friends Chester Tam, Chris Romano, and Eric Falconer to create an "unofficial" fifth episode of the series.

No. overall	No. in season	Title	Directed by	Written by	Original release date
5	5	"Episode 5"	Justin Roiland	Chester Tam, Chris Romano, and Eric Falconer	June 26, 2005
Bill Cosby's lawyer performs fellatio on Bill Cosby.

== Reception ==
Erik Adams of The A.V. Club called it a "hilarious" show that "ended too soon, [and] proved to be as versatile as its clones."
