= Feral Audio =

Entertainment company

- Industry: Podcasting
- Founded: 2012
- Founder: Dustin Marshall
- Headquarters: Los Angeles, California, U.S.
- Area served: Worldwide
- Key people: Jason Smith - Partner/CEO; Dustin Marshall - founder/CCO; Kristin Myers - Creative Director; Noah Eberhart - Lead Producer; Stephen Perlstein - Sales and Advertising Director
- Products: Harmontown; The Duncan Trussell Family Hour; Call Chelsea Peretti; My Favorite Murder; Doughboys; Improv Nerd; Dumb People Town; Sleep with Me; Emotional Hangs; Ethnically Ambiguous; Natch Beaut; Beyond Yacht Rock; The Todd Barry Podcast; Slumber Party with Alie and Georgia
- Website: feralaudio.com (defunct)

Feral Audio was an independent podcast network and production company, founded in 2012 as a podcasting collective by Dustin Marshall after Dustin left Earwolf.

Feral launched from Executive Producer's Shadi Petosky's apartment in Franklin Village to be near the Upright Citizens Brigade Theater. Shadi, through her studio PUNY Entertainment, financed Feral and PUNY artists created Feral's brand identity, website, and cover art for Feral's first slate of podcasts.

In 2013, Feral moved to Starburns Industries in Burbank, CA. Feral Audio LLC was formed in January 2016 as a partnership between Dustin Marshall, Jason Smith, Dan Harmon, and Starburns Industries.

Feral Audio billed itself as a "Fiercely Independent Podcast Network", offering its shows' creators 100% ownership and creative control over their content. Since its inception, Feral Audio produced high rated and critically acclaimed shows such as Harmontown, The Duncan Trussell Family Hour, and My Favorite Murder.

In July 2016, Feral Audio became the first podcast network to have a panel in San Diego Comic Con's Hall H.

On January 2, 2018, it was announced that Feral Audio was shutting down in the wake of claims of abuse against its founder Dustin Marshall. Some of the podcasts produced by Feral Audio have since moved to the then newly created Starburns Audio podcast network.
