= Great Minds with Dan Harmon =

American comedy television series

- Genre: Comedy
- Created by: Dan Harmon; Richard Korson
- Written by: Dan Harmon; Andrew Weinberg
- Directed by: Heath Cullens
- Starring: Dan Harmon; Spencer Crittenden
- Country of origin: United States
- Original language: English
- No. of seasons: 1
- No. of episodes: 15

Production
- Executive producers: Richard Korson; Jay Peterson; Dan Harmon; Dino Stamatopoulos
- Cinematography: John Tanzer; Sarah Levy
- Editors: A.J. Catoline; Diana Fishman
- Camera setup: Single-camera
- Running time: 10–11 minutes
- Production companies: Matador Content; Starburns Industries

Original release
- Network: History
- Release: February 25 – June 16, 2016

Great Minds with Dan Harmon is an American comedy television series that aired from February 25 to June 16, 2016 on History. The series stars writer Dan Harmon and his assistant Spencer Crittenden, who transport a series of historical figures to the present.

The series is part of History's "Night Class" programming block and was available to stream on History's website and YouTube channel. The videos have since been removed but short clips are still available on YouTube.

== Premise ==
Writer Dan Harmon has his assistant Spencer Crittenden construct a time machine to transport historical figures from the past so he can interview them for the History channel. The interviewees only survive for a few hours before undergoing a "total protoplasmic disconversion" and collapsing into dust, which Spencer collects in a jar.

== Cast and characters ==
=== Main ===
- Dan Harmon as himself
- Spencer Crittenden as himself

=== Guest ===
- Jack Black as Ludwig van Beethoven
- Scott Adsit as Ernest Hemingway
- Jason Sudeikis as Thomas Edison
- Aubrey Plaza as Mary Wollstonecraft
- Thomas Middleditch as William Shakespeare
- Ron Funches as Idi Amin
- Sarah Silverman as Betsy Ross
- Kristen Schaal as Amelia Earhart
- Nick Kroll as Sigmund Freud
- Paul F. Tompkins as Edgar Allan Poe
- Danny Pudi as Buddha
- Andy Dick as John Wilkes Booth
- Gillian Jacobs as Ada Lovelace
- Dana Carvey as John F. Kennedy
- Matt Walsh as Harry S. Truman

== Episodes ==
No.	Historical figure	Directed by	Written by	Original release date
1	"Ludwig van Beethoven"	Heath Cullens	Dan Harmon	February 25, 2016
Given a hearing aid, Beethoven hears some of his most famous compositions for the first time, remarking that the Moonlight Sonata sounds nothing like his intention and enlightening Dan regarding the lyrics to his Symphony No. 5.
2	"Ernest Hemingway"	Heath Cullens	Andrew Weinberg	March 3, 2016
Dan attempts to bond with Hemingway over their common interests in drinking and writing, but is intimidated by his masculinity. He tries to get Hemingway to play paintball, but Hemingway instead takes them fishing, despite the California drought.
3	"Thomas Edison"	Heath Cullens	Dan Harmon	March 10, 2016
Unsatisfied with the quality of his phonograph recording, Edison insists on recording a new version in a modern recording studio, but electrocutes himself with a musical instrument of his own invention.
4	"Mary Wollstonecraft"	Heath Cullens	Dan Harmon	March 18, 2016
Mary's arrival gives Dan a chance to express his feminism, but he is irritated by Mary's stern demeanor. Meanwhile, it is Spencer's birthday.
5	"William Shakespeare"	Heath Cullens	Dan Harmon	March 24, 2016
After Shakespeare is unimpressed by Community, preferring the bawdy comedy film Dirty Grandpa, he and Dan trade barbs at a bar.
6	"Idi Amin"	Heath Cullens	Dan Harmon	March 31, 2016
Amin's arrival fulfills Dan's desire for ethnic diversity, but Amin takes the office hostage. Dan's father comes to the rescue and keeps Amin distracted until he disintegrates.
7	"Betsy Ross"	Heath Cullens	Dan Harmon	April 15, 2016
Betsy's racism discomforts Dan until they broach the subject of Bernie Sanders. Betsy throws herself into working for the Sanders campaign and sews a Sanders flag.
8	"Amelia Earhart"	Heath Cullens	Dan Harmon	April 21, 2016
Amelia is disappointed with her legacy of getting lost, and sets out to prove that she is indeed still alive, meeting her older self alive and well in a park.
9	"Sigmund Freud"	Heath Cullens	Dan Harmon	April 28, 2016
Freud arrives just in time to heal a rift between Dan and Spencer; Spencer refuses to use catchphrases written for him by Dan.
10	"Edgar Allan Poe"	Heath Cullens	Dan Harmon	May 5, 2016
Poe undermines Dan's need to impress a History Channel executive (Rajskub), who falls for Poe. Dan and Spencer attempt to influence their date to secure an additional run of episodes.
11	"Buddha"	Heath Cullens	Dan Harmon	June 11, 2016
The Buddha participates in a series of product placements, making Dan feel guilty. Buddha nearly single-handedly destroys the video game industry, but Steve Levy steps in and saves the day.
12	"John Wilkes Booth"	Heath Cullens	Dan Harmon	June 17, 2016
Booth emphasizes his skills as an actor rather than his notoriety as the assassin of Abraham Lincoln. Dan and Spencer, along with guest Besser, hope to force Booth to empathise with Lincoln by casting him as Lincoln in a play.
13	"Ada Lovelace"	Heath Cullens	Dan Harmon	June 25, 2016
After they bond over their shared love of coding, Ada convinces Spencer to convert his body to code and join her in virtual reality. They hack the Pentagon and are about to begin a nuclear war, but another Spencer arrives and deactivates the program, revealing that the first Spencer was merely a clone he made to test a new personality.
14	"John F. Kennedy"	Heath Cullens	Dan Harmon	July 1, 2016
Dan and Spencer learn their series has been canceled. Kennedy is accidentally transported along with a spider, creating an additional half-Kennedy-half-spider being which cocoons the crew. Kennedy lulls the spider-Kennedy into a false sense of trust, then stabs it to death with a screwdriver before disintegrating.
15	"Harry S. Truman"	Heath Cullens	Dan Harmon	July 16, 2016
After learning the show has been criticized by GLAAD, the LGBT media monitoring group, Dan takes Truman to a gay bar to teach him about gay rights and desperately pander to LGBT critics. Note: This episode was held from airing in the wake of the Orlando nightclub shooting.

== Production ==
=== Development ===
On August 5, 2015, it was announced that IFC had given the production a pilot order. The project at that stage of development was described as a comedic panel show where trending topics would be discussed. The show's twist would be that the panel would be made up of a revolving cast of comedians in character as various historical figures. The pilot was created by Richard Korson who executive produced alongside Dan Harmon, Jay Peterson, and Kara Welker. Production companies involved with the episode included Matador Content.

On February 18, 2016, it was announced that the project had been redeveloped into a short-form series set to air during a new late-night comedy programming block on History titled Night Class. The panel show format was dropped in favor a more traditional narrative structure.

=== Casting ===
In addition to featuring Harmon as host, the IFC pilot contained a panel including Rory Albanese as Benjamin Franklin, Robert Smigel as Albert Einstein, Bonnie McFarlane as Eleanor Roosevelt, and Seaton Smith as Frederick Douglass.

Alongside the announcement of the series' move to History, it was confirmed that guest actors would include Jack Black, Sarah Silverman, Jason Sudeikis, Dana Carvey, Aubrey Plaza, Kristen Schaal, Nick Kroll, Scott Adsit, Andy Dick, Ron Funches, Paul F. Tompkins, and Thomas Middleditch.
