= Yacht Rock (web series) =

American online video series

- Title screen of the first episode
- Genre: Mockumentary
- Created by: J. D. Ryznar, Hunter D. Stair, Lane Farnham
- Presented by: Steve Huey
- Starring: J. D. Ryznar, Hunter Stair, David B. Lyons
- Opening theme: "Sweet Freedom" by Michael McDonald
- Country of origin: United States
- Original language: English
- No. of seasons: 1
- No. of episodes: 12

Production
- Producers: JD Ryznar, Hunter D. Stair, David B. Lyons
- Production locations: Los Angeles, California
- Running time: 5–9 minutes

Original release
- Network: Channel 101
- Release: June 26, 2005 – April 14, 2010

Yacht Rock is an online video series following the fictionalized lives and careers of American soft rock stars of the late 1970s and early 1980s. The series debuted at a Channel 101 screening on June 26, 2005. It placed in the top five at subsequent screenings until June 25, 2006, when the tenth episode placed seventh at the screening, and the series was canceled. The show remained a popular download on the Channel 101 website, convincing the creators to make two additional episodes independently. The eleventh episode, featuring Jason Lee as Kevin Bacon, debuted in a screening at the Knitting Factory in New York City on December 27, 2007, and was later included with the other episodes on Channel 101. On May 5, 2010, the twelfth and final episode of Yacht Rock was released on YouTube and Channel 101. The series coined and popularized the term yacht rock as a musical descriptor for the songs and artists it features.

== Creation and inspiration ==
The series was written, directed, and produced by J. D. Ryznar, co-produced by David Lyons and Hunter D. Stair, and edited by Lane Farnham. The production has a "bad-on-purpose aesthetic" devised by Farnham.

Ryznar and Stair devised the series after noticing the converging recording careers of such bands as Steely Dan, Toto, and The Doobie Brothers, and the singer-songwriters Kenny Loggins and Michael McDonald. For example, McDonald co-wrote and sang on Loggins' "This Is It" and Loggins co-wrote "What a Fool Believes" with McDonald, of which Loggins first performed before being popularized by The Doobie Brothers. McDonald also performed backing vocals for several other "yacht rock" artists, including Steely Dan and Christopher Cross.

Ryznar admits to having a fascination with the music of the period. As he explained, "Getting into Steely Dan really started this for me, as did the ability to buy dollar records at Amoeba and put them on tapes for my car. Kenny Loggins has made his way into all the pilots I've been involved with except [one]." As he told Reuters contributor Andy Sullivan, "I'm making fun of the songwriting process, but the music is generally treated pretty lovingly."

== Synopsis ==
Yacht Rock's episodes are "hosted" by "Hollywood" Steve Huey, a former AllMusic critic. The term "yacht rock" is never used throughout the series by any characters, except for Huey during his introductions; instead, it is always referred to as "smooth music".

The series depicts some realistic aspects of the music, but builds exaggerated storylines around them. For example, main protagonists Loggins and McDonald, played by Stair and Ryznar, receive inspiration from a fictional impresario named Koko Goldstein, played by Lyons, whose death in the second episode ultimately leads them to go their separate ways. McDonald is an idealistic and earnest singer/songwriter who takes both smooth music and himself far too seriously, while Loggins is his easygoing friend and collaborator who eventually abandons smooth music in favor of commercial rock and film soundtracks in the 1980s, straining their friendship.

The portrayal of John Oates as the abusive, foulmouthed leader of Hall and Oates and enemy of "smooth music", exerting sometimes violent control over the milquetoast Daryl Hall, is exaggerated. Christopher Cross, played by future Rick and Morty co-creator Justin Roiland, is depicted as a naive, timid hayseed whose song "Sailing" accidentally becomes a "smooth music" standard-bearer. Loggins' former partner Jim Messina (Farnham) is a bitter wino who resents Loggins for finding success without him. Michael Jackson is depicted as a newly-minted rocker who believes his partnership with Eddie Van Halen will lead to an endless parade of sexual conquests. The Eagles, portrayed as jock-like meatheads, and Steely Dan (portrayed as snarky nerds, with Donald Fagen speaking in an incoherent babble of scat that only McDonald and caustic bandmate Walter Becker can understand) really did insert lyrical references to each other in their music as depicted in the show, but these were friendly nods rather than part of a violent rivalry.

== Reception ==
John Oates credited Yacht Rock with rekindling interest in Hall & Oates and introducing them to a younger audience. In 2007, Oates said:

I think Yacht Rock was the beginning of this whole Hall & Oates resurrection ... They were the first ones to start to parody us and put us out there again, and a lot of things have happened because of Yacht Rock.

Michael McDonald praised the series in a 2008 interview:

Have you ever owned a yacht?
No, but I thought Yacht Rock was hilarious. And uncannily, you know, those things always have a little bit of truth to them. It's kind of like when you get a letter from a stalker who's never met you. They somehow hit on something, and you have to admit they're pretty intuitive.

In 2015, SiriusXM broadcast a limited-time "Yacht Rock Radio" channel on satellite from August 21 – September 22. This SXM satellite channel has "popped up" every summer since, most recently from late May to early October 2021, while also maintaining a year-round dedicated Yacht Rock online streaming channel.

On November 29, 2024, HBO debuted a documentary about yacht rock that prominently features the web series.

== Beyond Yacht Rock ==
In 2016, Ryznar, Huey, Stair, and Lyons began a podcast called Beyond Yacht Rock. This series revolves around top-ten countdowns of genres they have newly invented, as well as episodes built around analyses of the work of musicians such as Steve Perry and Van Halen. The series also includes more commentary on the yacht rock style, such as evaluating songs according to whether or not they fit the creators' description of the style (which they call "Yacht or Nyacht"). The podcast concluded in 2021 after 100 episodes. In 2023, The Yacht or Nyacht Podcast began as a spinoff solely focused on commenting and rating songs submitted by listeners, while the original format without this segment was relaunched in 2025 as Beyond Yacht Rock 2000.

== Episodes ==
No.	Title	Original release date
1	"What a Fool Believes"	June 26, 2005
Under the guidance of Koko Goldstein, Kenny Loggins reaches out to a struggling Michael McDonald, who has been given an ultimatum from bandmate Jeff "Skunk" Baxter to write a hit for The Doobie Brothers or be fired from the band. Featured songs: "You Never Change" by the Doobie Brothers; "Sailin' the Wind" by Loggins and Messina; "Whenever I Call You 'Friend'" by Kenny Loggins; "What a Fool Believes" by the Doobie Brothers; also featured as incidental music is "Breezin'" by George Benson.
2	"Keep the Fire"	TBA
Loggins and McDonald pair up against the duo Hall & Oates for a songwriting competition. Koko is accidentally impaled by his lucky harpoon during the ensuing melee, but is at peace before his death by hearing the smoothest song ever sung, "Sailing", by a young Christopher Cross (Justin Roiland). Featured songs: "Sara Smile" and "Portable Radio" by Hall and Oates; "This is It" by Kenny Loggins; "Sailing" by Christopher Cross. The intro of "Peg" by Steely Dan is played at the outset of the episode.
3	"I'm Alright"	TBA
As everyone grieves Koko's death, Loggins lashes out at McDonald and smooth music as a whole, causing a rift between the two. Sleazy entertainment executive Gene Balboa, who is producing the movie Caddyshack, demands that director Harold Ramis obtain Loggins' talents to write the movie's theme song. Ramis, with the aid of Steve Perry, takes advantage of an angry and confused Loggins and gets him to record "I'm Alright", much to McDonald's dismay. Featured songs: "Time Out of Mind" by Steely Dan; "Keep the Fire" by Kenny Loggins; "How do the Fools Survive" by The Doobie Brothers; "Lights" and "Any Way You Want It" by Journey; "Kid Charlemagne" by Steely Dan; "I'm Alright" by Kenny Loggins.
4	"Rosanna"	TBA
Steve Porcaro (Steve Agee) of Toto is asked by his girlfriend, Rosanna Arquette (Morgan Murphy), to write a song about her featuring Michael McDonald's vocals. Discouraged by McDonald's disdain for his band, Porcaro devises a three-step plan to make it happen, with the help of Ramis, Loggins, and Perry. Featured songs: "Hold The Line", "Make Believe" and "Rosanna" by Toto; "Ride Like the Wind" by Christopher Cross; "Don't Fight It" by Kenny Loggins and Steve Perry
5	"Believe in It"	TBA
Toto has been commissioned to write a smooth song for Michael Jackson's Thriller, but Jackson violently rejects them, believing after working with Eddie Van Halen on "Beat It" that such material is in his past. Fearing that Jackson can destroy smooth music for a decade, Porcaro turns to McDonald, Loggins, Skunk Baxter, Cross, and Vincent Price (James Adomian) to summon Koko's ghost to "spook the smooth back into him". Featured songs: "Believe In It" by Michael McDonald; "Beat It" by Michael Jackson; "Thriller" by Michael Jackson; "I Gotta Try" by Kenny Loggins and Michael McDonald (both versions); "Sailing" by Christopher Cross; "Eruption" by Van Halen; "Human Nature" by Michael Jackson.
6	"The Seed Drill"	TBA
"Hollywood" Steve's father, Ferris State University history professor "Big Rapids" Gary Huey, demands that Steve stop wasting his time on Yacht Rock, and relates a historic tale of the agriculturist Jethro Tull, the plot of which is similar to episode one. Featured songs: "Aqualung", "Teacher", "Jack in the Green", "Living in the Past" and "The Whistler" by Jethro Tull
7	"I Keep Forgettin'"	TBA
McDonald and Loggins make a bet about the popularity of McDonald's new song, "I Keep Forgettin' (Every Time You're Near)", which Loggins wins. Ten years later, Long Beach-based rapper Warren G struggles to find a unique sound and image in the gangsta rap world. After he and Nate Dogg accidentally hit McDonald with their car and then take him back to Dr. Dre's house, a solution is found to everyone's problems. Featured songs: "I Keep Forgettin' (Every Time You're Near)" by Michael McDonald; "Swear Your Love" by Kenny Loggins; "Gz and Hustlas" by Snoop Dogg; "Let Me Ride" by Dr. Dre; "Who Am I? (What's My Name?)" by Snoop Dogg; "Regulate" by Warren G ft Nate Dogg
8	"Gino (the Manager)""	TBA
"Hollywood" Steve returns to the very beginning, where Doobie Brothers producer Ted Templeman (Dan Harmon) explains his dream about the origin of "the smoothest rock [he's] ever heard" to Skunk Baxter over lunch. Baxter suggests seeing Koko about it, and Templeman starts seeing his dream become real as he meets a young McDonald, then a background singer for Steely Dan, being talked into joining the Doobie Brothers by Steely Dan and Koko. Meanwhile, Loggins shows signs of his imminent break from Messina and solo stardom, and an effeminate Hall and Oates arrive with a very familiar looking manager named Gino who tries to bully Loggins into employing him. When he refuses, Gino plots revenge, restyling himself as Gene Balboa and infiltrating Hollywood. Featured songs: "Love Will Keep Us Together" by Captain and Tennille, "Any World (That I'm Welcome To)" by Steely Dan, "Watching The River Run" by Loggins And Messina, "Gino (The Manager)" by Daryl Hall & John Oates, "Takin' It to the Streets" by The Doobie Brothers.
9	"Runnin' with the Devil"	TBA
Van Halen puts a curse on Ted Templeman, making him unable to stand the sound of Michael McDonald's voice, to force him to produce their debut album. In a subplot, Loggins loses his car keys and has everyone in the studio help him look for them. Comedian Drew Carey makes a cameo appearance along with fellow Whose Line Is It Anyway star Jeff Davis, who plays David Lee Roth in this episode. Featured songs: "Atomic Punk" by Van Halen, "Runnin' with the Devil" by Van Halen, "Echoes of Love" by The Doobie Brothers, "I'm the One" by Van Halen. In addition, a short clip of Ian Hunter's "Cleveland Rocks" (as recorded by The Presidents of the United States of America for The Drew Carey Show) is used during the introduction with Carey.
10	"FM"	June 25, 2006
Steely Dan and the Eagles settle a long-time, childish feud with a hit song. Featured songs: "I Believe in Love" by Kenny Loggins, "Life in the Fast Lane" by The Eagles, "Everything You Did" by Steely Dan, "Do It Again" by Steely Dan, "Peg" by Steely Dan, "Hotel California" by the Eagles, "FM (No Static At All)" by Steely Dan. In addition, an instrument snippet of "Winter" by Tori Amos is used in the introduction.
11	"Footloose"	December 27, 2007
Jimmy Buffett is convinced by Kevin Bacon (Jason Lee) and Gene Balboa to trick Loggins into making yet another film theme. He is subsequently kidnapped by Buffett and psychotic "parrotheads", and it's up to McDonald and James Ingram (Wyatt Cenac) to rescue him. Featured songs: "Holding Out for a Hero" by Bonnie Tyler; "If It's Not What You're Looking For" by Kenny Loggins; "Yah Mo B There" by James Ingram and Michael McDonald; "Changes in Latitudes, Changes in Attitudes" by Jimmy Buffett; "I'm Free (Heaven Helps the Man)" by Kenny Loggins; " Margaritaville", "Pencil Thin Mustache", "Why Don't We Get Drunk", and "Boat Drinks" by Jimmy Buffett; "Footloose" by Kenny Loggins.
12	"Danger Zone"	TBA
In 1985, McDonald feels that he has become the irrelevant joke Loggins told him he would become with the death of smooth music. Loggins, on the other hand, has grown to love doing movie soundtracks and harder rock and his career is still in high gear. Extraterrestrial composer Giorgio Moroder (John Konesky) is sent to Earth to seek Loggins' assistance in fighting a black hole that will destroy his home planet, but Hall and Oates, who hail from the black hole, vow to stop them. Fearing for his friend's life, McDonald tries to rescue him, and with the help of Christopher Cross finds a way to keep with the times. By the end of the episode the loose ends of the past eleven episodes are tied together (including the revelation that all of Yacht Rock had been a plan by Koko to lead to the song "Sweet Freedom"), but left with a cliffhanger ending as to who murdered Koko. Rob Schrab, Matt Braunger, and Dahéli Hall make cameo appearances as Bruce Springsteen, Huey Lewis, and Tina Turner, respectively. Featured songs: "We Are the World" by USA for Africa, "Charm the Snake" by Christopher Cross, "Method of Modern Love" by Hall and Oates, "Danger Zone" and "Playing with the Boys" by Kenny Loggins, "Sweet Freedom" by Michael McDonald, "Sailing" by Christopher Cross.

== Real people portrayed in Yacht Rock ==
- Sara Allen
- Ian Anderson
- Michael Anthony (referred to as 'the other guy')
- Rosanna Arquette
- Dan Aykroyd
- Kevin Bacon
- Jeff "Skunk" Baxter
- Walter Becker
- Jeremiah Birnbaum
- David Bowie
- Lindsey Buckingham
- Jimmy Buffett
- Kim Carnes
- Peter Cetera
- Ray Charles
- Chevy Chase
- Christopher Cross
- Nate Dogg
- Daryl Dragon
- Dr. Dre
- Bob Dylan
- Donald Fagen
- Glenn Frey
- Warren G
- Daryl Hall
- Don Henley
- David Hungate
- James Ingram
- La Toya Jackson
- Michael Jackson
- Al Jarreau
- Cyndi Lauper
- Huey Lewis
- Kenny Loggins
- Steve Lukather
- Michael McDonald
- Jim Messina
- Giorgio Moroder
- Willie Nelson
- John Oates
- David Paich
- Steve Perry
- Jeff Porcaro
- Steve Porcaro
- Vincent Price
- Harold Ramis
- Kenny Rogers
- David Lee Roth
- Tom Savarese
- Patrick Simmons
- Paul Simon
- Bruce Springsteen
- Ted Templeman
- Toni Tennille
- Charles, Lord Townshend
- Jethro Tull
- Tina Turner
- Alex Van Halen
- Eddie Van Halen
- Dionne Warwick

== See also ==
- List of soft rock artists and songs
- Culture of California
