= Scud: The Disposable Assassin (video game) =

1997 video game

- North American Saturn cover art
- Developer: Syrox Developments
- Publisher: SegaSoft
- Platform: Sega Saturn
- Release: NA: March 20, 1997
- Genres: Run and gun, light gun shooter
- Modes: Single player, multiplayer

Scud: The Disposable Assassin is a Sega Saturn video game based on the comic book series of the same name. It was released on March 20, 1997 in North America only, though it is region-free. It is unusual in that it can be played either as a run and gun game, or with a light gun. The main characters and plotline are mostly the same from the comic series, and Scud creator Rob Schrab said that he felt it did justice to his characters.

The storyline revolves around Scud, a Heart Breaker Series 1373 model assassin, a fictional type of robotic assassin, his partner, Drywall, a bizarre character whose body can hold an unlimited amount of storage space, Sussudio, a bounty hunter that at first tries to kill Scud, and several other characters from the series.

A second game, Scud: Industrial Evolution, was released in 1997 for Microsoft Windows.

== Gameplay ==
The game includes modes to play using either the standard Saturn gamepad or the Saturn Stunner light gun, as well as a mode intended to be played with two Stunners in order to emulate Scud's characteristic dual-wielding.

If the player finds Drywall, he is unlocked as a playable character, in the process unlocking a two-player mode in which one player controls Scud and another controls Drywall. The two players can use standard gamepads, Stunners, or a combination of the two.

== Critical reception ==
Reception

Aggregate score
Aggregator	Score
GameRankings	63% (5 reviews)

Review scores
Publication	Score
AllGame	1/5
Electronic Gaming Monthly	7.125/10
GameSpot	5.6/10
Next Generation	2/5
The Electric Playground	5/10

Scud received mediocre reviews. While critics generally complimented the graphics for their design, detailed rendering, and touches of humor, and noted the originality of the game having three modes with different control methods, they also concurred that all three modes suffer to some extent from repetitiveness and lack of depth. While critics from Electronic Gaming Monthly and Next Generation found the one player with two guns mode fun, the EGM reviewers said it was also too easy, and most critics found this mode as dull as the others. Commenting on the combination of innovative ideas and weak execution, Next Generation summarized it as "another noble failure."

Other elements of the game aroused varying opinions, particularly the music. Jeff Gerstmann from GameSpot said it was "surprisingly good", Sushi-X of EGM called it "corny", Bonehead of GamePro claimed it "induces headaches", and Victor Lucas of The Electric Playground opined that, "Grungy guitar licks and kick ass percussion prevail, and busloads of screaming rock stars get you appropriately riled up to start blasting away. This is great music to shoot by." And while Sushi-X and Lucas described the game's full motion video as "nicely rendered" and "positively brilliant" respectively, Gerstmann said the video quality "could be compared to a movie that's been projected onto a glob of cottage cheese".
