= Story circle =

Story circle may refer to:

- A group story sharing technique developed by the Student Nonviolent Coordinating Committee during the American Civil Rights Movement in the 1960s
- A screenwriting technique created by television producer Dan Harmon in the 1990s
