= Planet Unicorn =

- Genre: Animated; Comedy
- Created by: Tyler Spiers; Mike Rose
- Voices of: Tyler Spiers; Mike Rose; Drew Droege
- Composer: Ryan Elder
- Country of origin: United States
- Original language: English

Production
- Producers: Tyler Spiers; Mike Rose
- Editors: Tyler Spiers; Mike Rose; Craig Morris; Rob Potter
- Running time: Approx. 4 minutes

Original release
- Release: February 28 – July 29, 2007

Planet Unicorn is an American animated cartoon series created by Mike Rose and Tyler Spiers for the web series-screening contest Channel 101. The fictional stories revolve around three talking unicorns - Feathers, Cadillac, and Tom Cruise - who were created by an 8-year-old gay boy named Shannon.

== Characters ==
Major Characters	Played by
Shannon	Mike Rose
Feathers	Drew Droege
Cadillac	Mike Rose
Tom Cruise	Tyler Spiers

Minor Characters	Played by
Crybaby Troll	Tyler Spiers
The Rock	Tyler Spiers
Debbie	Tyler Spiers
The Ocean	Tyler Spiers
The Frog	Drew Droege
The Flower	Bennie Arthur

== Episode list ==
- Episode 1: The unicorns encounter Shannon for the first time and thwart a threat to their environment. We learn of Tom Cruise's special ability.
- Episode 2: The unicorns discover the importance of expressing emotions.
- Episode 3: A trip to the sea proves dangerous. Cadillac's special ability is revealed.
- Episode 4: Vanity threatens to ruin the unicorns' friendship.
- Episode 5: Shannon's new friend comes between him and the unicorns. Feathers displays his special ability.
- Episode 6: The unicorns learn about Christmas and fill in for Santa's reindeer, while the reindeer explore Planet Unicorn.

== Trivia ==
The series is a production for Channel 101, where it lasted six episodes before being cancelled by the live audience, and was also distributed through MySpace.

The show has been featured on NPR's Day to Day show, in Out (August 2007), Time Out New York (August 2007), and was named as one of New York's 20 Funniest Web Videos of 2007. The creators have also been interviewed on Red Eye w/ Greg Gutfeld. The show received the 2008 "OMFG Internet" award from the Logo Channel.
