= Justin Roiland =

American voice actor and animator (born 1980)

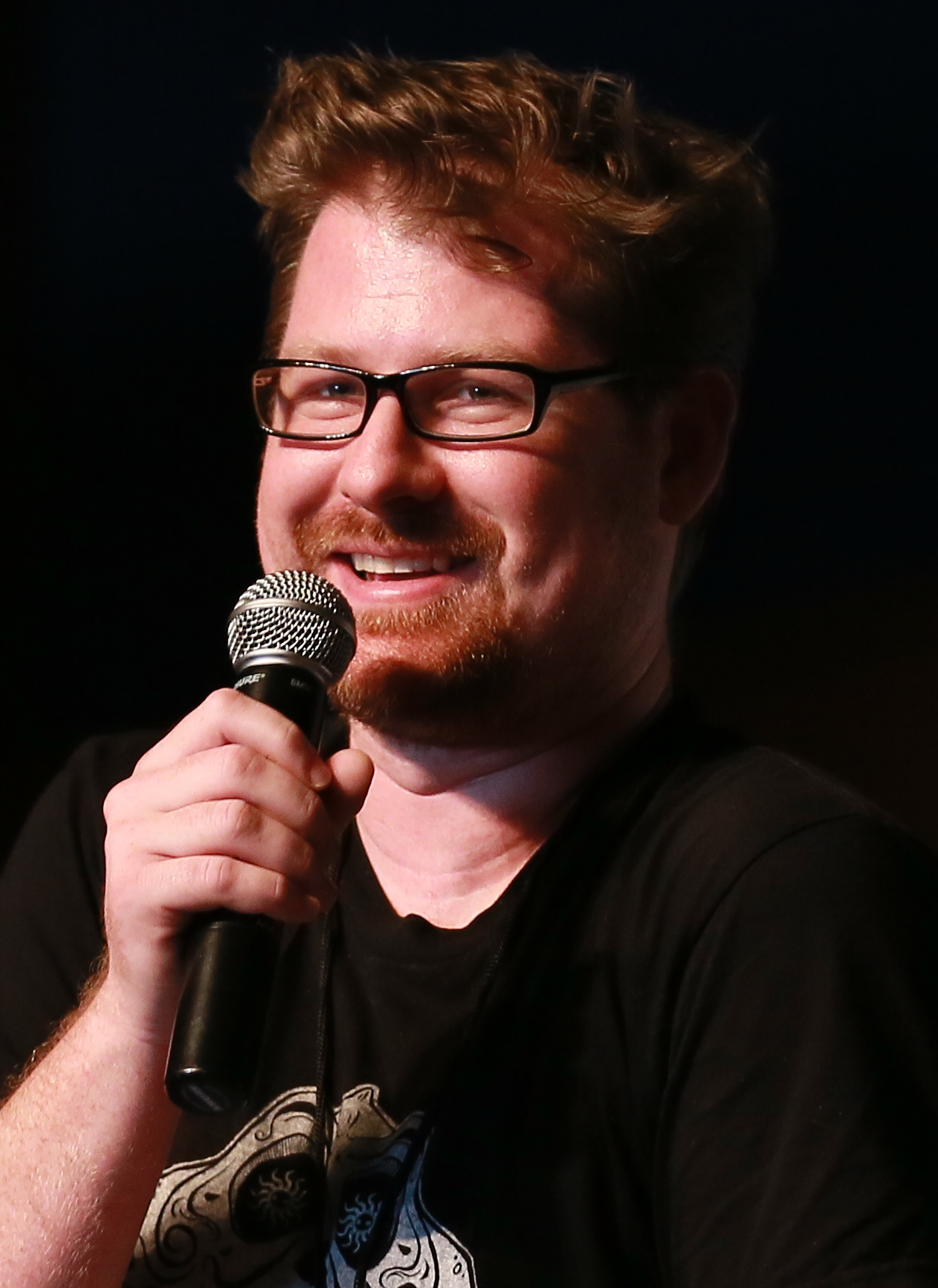
- Roiland at the 2017 Raleigh Supercon
- Born: Mark Justin Roiland; February 21, 1980 (age 46); Manteca, California, U.S.
- Education: Modesto Junior College
- Occupations: Voice actor; animator; writer; producer; director
- Years active: 2004–2023
- Website: roilandtv.com

Mark Justin Roiland (born February 21, 1980) is an American voice actor, animator, writer, and producer. He co-created the Adult Swim animated sitcom Rick and Morty, for which he voiced the protagonists Rick Sanchez and Morty Smith from 2013 to 2022, as well as Hulu's Solar Opposites, in which he voiced main character Korvo from 2020 to 2022, until both networks severed ties with him in 2023. He had also voiced Earl of Lemongrab in Adventure Time, Blendin Blandin in Gravity Falls, and Oscar in Fish Hooks. He founded the animation studio Justin Roiland's Solo Vanity Card Productions! and the video game studio Squanch Games, though he resigned from the latter in 2023.

In early 2023, Roiland was dismissed from most of the companies he was working with due to accusations of domestic violence and abuse. The charges were later dismissed due to insufficient evidence, but in September 2023, new allegations of sexual assault were reported against him.

== Early life ==
Roiland was born and raised in Manteca, California. He attended Sierra High School up until the first quarter of his senior year and then transferred to Manteca High School for the remainder of his senior year, graduating in 1998. After high school, he attended Modesto Junior College in Modesto. Roiland is dyslexic.

== Career ==
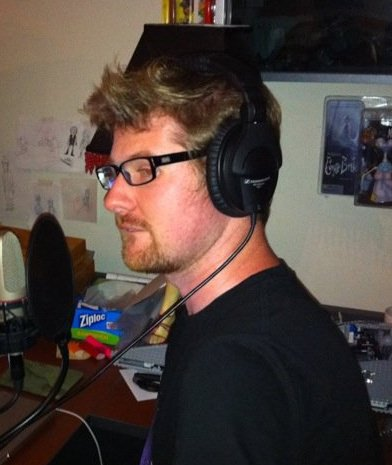
Roiland in 2010

In 2002, Roiland moved to Houston, Texas and, in 2004, got involved with Channel 101, an L.A. media collective started by Dan Harmon and Rob Schrab, where he made and acted in numerous movie shorts (such as 2 Girls One Cup: The Show, House of Cosbys and a small role as musician Christopher Cross in the series Yacht Rock) and in the VH1 television show Acceptable TV. He appeared regularly on The Sarah Silverman Program on Comedy Central as "Blonde Craig". From 2010 to 2016, he co-hosted The Grandma's Virginity Podcast with future Rick and Morty writer Ryan Ridley and future Steven Universe producer Jackie Buscarino. Some of Roiland's influences include Matt Groening's The Simpsons, John Kricfalusi's The Ren & Stimpy Show, Mike Judge's Beavis and Butt-Head, and Jhonen Vasquez's Invader Zim.

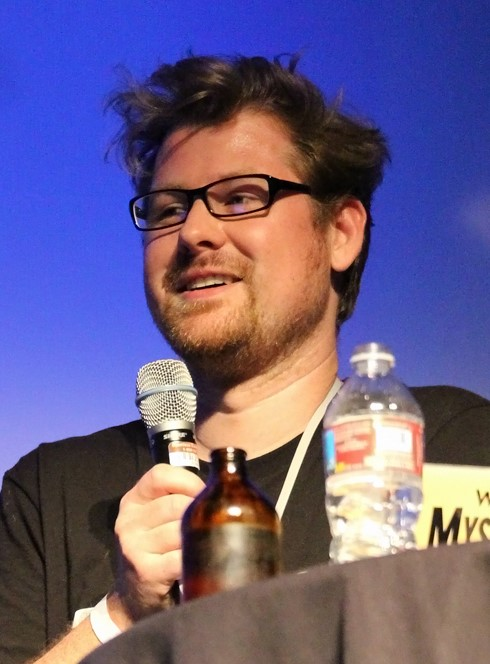
Roiland at the 2015 XOXO festival

In 2012, Adult Swim approached Harmon to produce a new animated series for their network. Harmon approached Roiland and, together, they created Rick and Morty (based on Roiland's previous work for Channel 101, "The Real Animated Adventures of Doc and Mharti"), which debuted in 2013 to widespread acclaim. The show quickly grew a fan community as audiences praised the show for its unique storytelling and incorporation of science fiction elements. Between 2013 and 2022, Roiland voiced Rick Sanchez and his grandson Morty Smith. In addition to the voice work, Roiland served as a co-writer and executive producer alongside Dan Harmon. By the end of season 1, Rick and Morty became one of the most successful shows Adult Swim ever produced. The success of the show spearheaded an entire franchise, with various themed merchandise being produced and sold. In addition to the show, an app called "Pocket Mortys" was created. On August 25, 2016, Roiland launched virtual reality studio Squanchtendo, a portmanteau of the company Nintendo and Rick and Morty character Squanchy. It was later renamed to Squanch Games. Its first full-length title, Accounting+, made in collaboration with William Pugh's studio, was released for PSVR on December 19, 2017.

In January 2021, Roiland sold a dozen artworks in an NFT art collection titled "The Best I Could Do" for a total of $1.65 million. His highest-selling piece, Simpsons homage The Smintons, sold at $290,100. Roiland also sold his first painting, titled mypeoplefriend, via auction by Sotheby's in July 2021.

== Domestic and sexual abuse allegations ==
=== Accusations of violence and abuse ===
In August 2020, Roiland was arrested and charged with felony domestic battery and false imprisonment in Orange County, California, in connection with an alleged incident in January 2020 involving an unnamed woman he was reportedly dating at the time. Roiland was released on bail after pleading not guilty, and a pre-trial hearing was scheduled for April 27, 2023. Knowledge of these events was not publicized until NBC News reported on the matter in January 2023.

After the charges were announced, multiple people came forward with their own allegations of abuse by Roiland in the #MeToo movement, including claims on Twitter of predatory behavior towards minors. Accusations involving adults include a sexually explicit private message he sent to musician Allie Goertz, who was at the time working on a Rick and Morty concept album. Earlier, he had been accused of sexual harassment of a female writer on the third season of Rick and Morty and other uncomfortable behavior in the workplace; these claims were formally investigated by Cartoon Network and Adult Swim in 2020 and were not reported until 2023.

Adult Swim announced later that month that Roiland had been dismissed from Rick and Morty, and that his roles would be recast for future seasons. Squanch Games affirmed that Roiland had resigned from the company on January 16, 2023, in the wake of the Adult Swim news. On January 25, 20th Television Animation confirmed that he had also been removed from Solar Opposites and Koala Man, which will also continue to be produced without his involvement.

In March 2023, the criminal charges against Roiland were dismissed due to insufficient evidence. He released a statement on social media saying he is "determined to move forward and focus both on my creative projects and restoring my good name".

=== Sexual assault allegations ===
In September 2023, NBC News reported that allegations of sexual assault and communicating explicitly online with underage girls had been reported, with some dating back to 2013. Roiland's lawyer, Andrew Brettler, denied the allegations.

Rick and Morty co-creator Dan Harmon stated of the new allegations that he was "frustrated, ashamed and heartbroken that a lot of hard work, joy and passion can be leveraged to exploit and harm strangers".

== Filmography ==
=== Film ===
| Year | Title | Role | Notes |
|---|---|---|---|
| 2006 | Tenacious D: Time Fixers | Abe Lincoln | Short film |
| 2015 | Krampus | Clumpy | Voice |
| 2018 | Smallfoot | Garry | Voice |
| 2018 | Seth Rogen's Hilarity for Charity | Char | Voice |
| 2019 | Invader Zim: Enter the Florpus | Foodio 3000, Weird Alien #1, Excited Audience Member | Voice, Netflix film |
| 2021 | Space Jam: A New Legacy | Rick Sanchez, Morty Smith | Voice, cameo |

=== Television ===
| Year | Title | Role | Notes |
|---|---|---|---|
| 2004 | Cheap Seats without Ron Parker | Rhonda's Son | Episode: "1973 Superstars" |
| 2007 | Acceptable.TV | Mr. Sprinkles, various | |
| 2007–2010 | The Sarah Silverman Program | Blonde Craig, Chant Leader | 8 episodes |
| 2010–2014 | Fish Hooks | Oscar Fishtooth | Voice |
| 2011–2018 | Adventure Time | Earl of Lemongrab, Lemonhope, additional voices | 14 episodes |
| 2012–2015 | Gravity Falls | Blendin Blandin, Bobby Renzobbi, additional voices | 7 episodes |
| 2013 | Out There | Chris Novak | Voice, 10 episodes |
| 2013–2022 | Rick and Morty | Rick Sanchez, Morty Smith, Wayne "Mr. Poopybutthole", additional voices | Voice |
| 2014–2019 | The Cyanide & Happiness Show | Mr. Romero | |
| 2015 | The Simpsons | Rick Sanchez, Morty Smith | Voice, episode: "Mathlete's Feat" |
| 2015 | Community | Ice Cube Head | Voice, episode: "Emotional Consequences of Broadcast Television" |
| 2015 | Aqua Teen Hunger Force | Honest Abe Lincoln's Hot Links Mascot | Voice, episode: "Mouth Quest" |
| 2015–2017 | Pig Goat Banana Cricket | Psychopath Giraffe, Radical Rick, Customer | Voice, 7 episodes |
| 2015 | Yo Gabba Gabba! | Sea Queen | Voice, episode: "Mermaids" |
| 2016 | Animals. | H&M | Voice, episode: "Cats" |
| 2016 | Future-Worm! | General Couponocus, Mr. Clock Face, Professor Gigglesnorp, Commandant Giflington, Homework Android | Voice, 7 episodes |
| 2016 | Uncle Grandpa | Ricky's Tongue | Voice, episode: "Tongue Tied" |
| 2018–2019 | Hot Streets | Chubbie Webbers, additional voices | Voice |
| 2018 | Robot Chicken | Additional voices | Episode: "3 2 1 2 333, 222, 3…66?" |
| 2018 | 70th Primetime Emmy Awards | Rick Sanchez, Morty Smith | Voice, television special |
| 2019 | Star vs. the Forces of Evil | Doop-Doop | Voice, 2 episodes |
| 2020–2022 | Solar Opposites | Korvo, additional voices | Voice |
| 2021 | Invincible | Doug Cheston | Episode: "You Look Kinda Dead" |
| 2022 | The Boys Presents: Diabolical | Papers, Narrator's Dad, Picante's Dad | Voice, episode: "An Animated Short Where Pissed-Off Supes Kill Their Parents" |
| 2022 | The Paloni Show! Halloween Special! | Leroy Paloni | Voice |
| 2023 | Koala Man | Chad Wagon | Voice, episode: "The Red Hot Rule" |
| 2023 | King Star King | Hank Waffles | Voice, episode: "King Star King!/!/!/" |

==== Television crewmember ====
| Year | Title | Work | | | | Note |
| Year | Title | Creator | Director | Writer | Producer | Note |
|---|---|---|---|---|---|---|
| 2007 | Acceptable.TV | No | Yes | Yes | executive | |
| 2010–2014 | Fish Hooks | No | No | Yes | No | 10 episodes throughout season 1 |
| 2013–2022 | Rick and Morty | Yes | Yes | Yes | executive | |
| 2017 | Mystery Science Theater 3000 | No | No | Yes | No | Episode; "Reptilicus" |
| 2018–2019 | Hot Streets | No | No | No | executive | |
| 2020–2022 | Solar Opposites | Yes | Yes | Yes | executive | |
| 2022 | The Boys Presents: Diabolical | No | No | Yes | No | Episode: "An Animated Short Where Pissed-Off Supes Kill Their Parents" |
| 2022 | The Paloni Show! Halloween Special! | Yes | No | Yes | executive | |
| 2023 | Koala Man | No | No | No | executive | |
| 2023 | King Star King | No | No | Yes | executive | Episode: "King Star King!/!/!/" |

=== Web ===
| Year | Title | Role | Notes |
|---|---|---|---|
| 2004 | Sockbaby | Ronnie's Lungs | 1 episode |
| 2005 | House of Cosbys | Additional voices | Also director, writer and executive producer |
| 2005–2010 | Yacht Rock | Christopher Cross | 4 episodes |
| 2006 | The Real Animated Adventures of Doc and Mharti | Doc Smith, Mharti McDonhalds | Voice, short film |
| 2012 | SuperFuckers | Orange Lightning, Vortex | |
| 2013 | Game Grumps | Himself | 1 episode (unreleased) |
| 2016–2018 | H3 Podcast | Himself | 3 episodes |
| 2017 | Lasagna Cat | Himself | Episode: "10/20/1984" |
| 2018–2021 | Blark and Son | Junior | 8 episodes |
| 2019 | Meme Review | Guest | Episode: "Will Smith hosts Meme Review w/ Elon Musk" |
| 2019 | The Cyanide & Happiness Show | Boss | Episode: The Animator's Curse |
| 2022 | Half in the Bag | Guest | Overdub voices for Mike and Jay as Rick and Morty respectively |

=== Video games ===
In August 2016, Roiland set up a video game studio, Squanchtendo, which was later renamed to Squanch Games in December 2017.

| Year | Title | Role | Notes |
|---|---|---|---|
| 2013 | Adventure Time: Explore the Dungeon Because I Don't Know! | Earl of Lemongrab | |
| 2015 | Dota 2 | Rick Sanchez, Morty Smith | Rick and Morty Announcer DLC |
| 2015 | Lego Dimensions | Earl of Lemongrab | |
| 2015 | Adventure Time: Finn & Jake Investigations | Earl of Lemongrab | |
| 2015 | Dr. Langeskov, The Tiger, and the Terribly Cursed Emerald | Various Voices | |
| 2016 | Pocket Mortys | Rick Sanchez, Morty Smith | |
| 2016 | The Lab | Various Personality Cores | |
| 2016 | Job Simulator | Radio Announcer | |
| 2016 | Accounting | Various Voices | Also co-director and co-writer |
| 2017 | Rick and Morty: Virtual Rick-ality | Rick Sanchez, Morty Smith | |
| 2017 | LawBreakers | Blitzball | |
| 2019 | Trover Saves the Universe | Trover | |
| 2022 | High on Life | Kenny | |
| 2022 | Warped Kart Racers | Korvo | Archived recordings |
| 2022 | MultiVersus | Rick Sanchez, Morty Smith, Mr. Meeseeks | Archived recordings, replaced by Ian Cardoni and Harry Belden in the full release of the game |

== Awards and nominations ==
| Year | Award | Category | Nominee(s) | Result | Ref. |
|---|---|---|---|---|---|
| 2015 | Annie Award | Best General Audience Animated TV/Broadcast Production | Rick and Morty | Nominated | |
| 2017 | Teen Choice Awards | Choice Animated TV Show | Rick and Morty | Nominated | |
| 2018 | Critics' Choice Television Award | Best Animated Series | Rick and Morty | Won | |
| 2018 | Annie Award | Best General Audience Animated TV/Broadcast Production | Rick and Morty | Won | |
| 2018 | Saturn Award | Best Animated Series or Film on Television | Rick and Morty | Nominated | |
| 2018 | Teen Choice Awards | Choice Animated TV Show | Rick and Morty | Nominated | |
| 2018 | Primetime Emmy Award | Outstanding Animated Program | Rick and Morty for "Pickle Rick" | Won | |
| 2020 | D.I.C.E. Awards | Immersive Reality Game of the Year | Trover Saves the Universe | Nominated | |
| 2020 | Primetime Emmy Award | Outstanding Animated Program | Rick and Morty for "The Vat of Acid Episode" | Won | |
| 2021 | Critics' Choice Super Awards | Best Animated Series | Rick and Morty | Nominated | |
| 2021 | Critics' Choice Super Awards | Best Voice Actor in an Animated Series | Rick and Morty | Nominated | |
| 2021 | Annie Award | Best General Audience Animated TV/Broadcast Production | Rick and Morty | Nominated | |
| 2021 | Saturn Award | Best Animated Series on Television | Rick and Morty | Nominated | |
| 2022 | Hollywood Critics Association TV Award | Best Broadcast Network or Cable Animated Series or Television Movie | Rick and Morty | Won | |
| 2022 | Primetime Emmy Award | Outstanding Animated Program | Rick and Morty | Nominated | |
