= Scud: The Disposable Assassin =

American science fiction comic book

Scud The Disposable Assassin
- It's Cool to be a Robot

Publication information
- Publisher: Fireman Press; Image Comics
- Schedule: Monthly
- Publication date: 1994–1998, 2008
- No. of issues: 24

Creative team
- Created by: Rob Schrab
- Written by: Rob Schrab (#1–4, 6–9, 11–16 & 19–24); Dan Harmon (#4–5, 8–9, 13–15 & 17–19); Mondy Carter (#2–3, 7 & 10–11)
- Artist: Rob Schrab
- Colorist: Zac Rybacki

Scud: The Disposable Assassin (published from 1994 to 1998, and 2008) is a humorous, hyperkinetic science fiction comic by Rob Schrab about a world in which one can buy robot assassins out of vending machines, the most popular of which are intelligent robots that kill a specified target and then self-destruct.

The protagonist of the series is Scud, an average Heart Breaker Series 1373 model assassin. On his first mission, he is sent to kill Jeff, a rampaging female mutant with mousetraps for hands, an electrical plug for a head, and a squid strapped to her torso with a belt.

== Plot ==
In this future, it is possible to obtain robot assassins out of vending machines at the cost of 3 Franks. After terminating their target, the robot self-destructs for easy clean-up. During his first mission, the Scud we follow sees his self-destruct warning in a mirror during an 18-page fight scene. Programmed for self-preservation for the sake of winning fights, Scud doesn't want to die, so only wounds Jeff bad enough to be put on life support at a nearby hospital, ensuring their mutual survival.

The main plot of Scud: The Disposable Assassin follows Scud's career as a freelance mercenary and assassin, working to pay off Jeff's medical bills.

=== Issue #20 ===
With issue #20, the series went on indefinite hiatus with a cliffhanger. Schrab was growing dissatisfied with the direction the story was taking, and stepped back from the book rather than allowing things to worsen. At the same time his career in Hollywood began to pick up, so he shifted focus further away from the book. Since then Scud's publisher, Fireman Press, was dissolved after a falling out between Rob Schrab and a business partner over rights.

=== Four-issue series finale ===
On January 3, 2007, Schrab announced on his blog his plans to finish Scud in four parts, Issues 21–24, at which point he would release an omnibus of all 24 issues. Podcasts posted to Schrab's site gave his state of mind during the process, opportunities he is passing up to finish the book, and a view of the process he uses to create a comic page. Regarding the decision to conclude the series with 4 issues, Rob Schrab told fans that "he just couldn't make this another issue. I want Scud to go out with a bang."

The final installment of Scud was released as a four-part mini-series published by Image Comics, with covers by guest artists.

- #21 – Ashley Wood (February 2008) "Return of the Over–Used Muse"
  - Rob Schrab (March 2008) – WonderCon Exclusive Variant of Issue 21
  - Jack Gray (April 2008) – Second Print of Issue 21
- #22 – Jim Mahfood (March 2008) "Challenge of the Over-Used Muse"
  - Dan Hipp (April 2008) – Second Print of Issue 22
- #23 – David Hartman (April 2008) "Retaliation of the Over-Used Muse"
- #24 – Doug Tennapel (May 2008) "Death of the Over-Used Muse"

An oversized, one-volume edition of Scud entitled Scud The Disposable Assassin: The Whole Shebang! was released August 6, 2008. In addition to issues 1–24, it contains "Drywall: Unzipped" and Black Octopus: Sexy Genius.

Rob Schrab has stated that he currently has no plans for further issues of Scud Spin-offs – Scud: Tales from the Vending Machine and The Drywall & Oswald Show.

In a closing interview conducted by Doug TenNapel at the end of Issue #24, Rob stated that he would like to see La Cosa Nostroid concluded, but that it would be up to Dan Harmon who helmed the series.

== Characters ==
=== Main characters ===
- Scud – The robotic protagonist. One of a series of mass-produced android assassins, Scud will self-destruct if his original mission is completed, and sometimes refers to himself as a cowboy.
- Sussudio – A freelance bounty hunter hired to bring Scud in after he bails on an assassination assignment and goes rogue. Eventually, she reveals that she is a closet robosexual, and has fallen in love with Scud. Her full name is Sussudio "Suzy" Gritt, daughter of movie star Hank Gritt, having acted as the international jewel thief known as the "Black Octopus" as a teenager.
- Drywall – Scud's bizarre young sidekick whose body contains an unlimited amount of storage space, which holds everything from weapons to furniture. His speech can only be understood by beings without souls (such as Scud). In issue 21 it is revealed he learned how to speak English during Scud's absence. In issue 22, he is absorbed into System, rescuing his other brother Mess.
- Voodoo Ben Franklin – One of the principal villains, Voodoo Ben is the famous founding father, hellbent on controlling the world of organized crime. Ben commands an army of zombie people and dinosaurs, in addition to the forces of Hell later in the series, after Ben becomes a pawn of System, the Lord of Hell, and Drywall's younger brother.
- Jeff – Scud's very first assignment, a piecemeal monster with a plug for a head, mousetraps for hands, a squid strapped to her chest, and a mouth on each knee. All of her lines of dialogue are ripped from pop culture sources. She has demonstrated the ability to assimilate animal parts and mechanical devices for use as weapons. If she dies, Scud will self-destruct. Later in the series, it is revealed that Jeff is the last of the Four Horsemen of the Apocalypse, since Scud accidentally killed off the other three before they could hatch in the first issue of the series.

=== Supporting characters ===
- Oswald – A previous Scud model who had his self-destruct module removed. Oswald has been known to help out Scud from time to time. He is modelled after a rabbit, and can use his ears as weapons. Schrab said Oswald was a nod to Jaxxon, the Green Bunny character in the Star Wars Comics of the eighties. In issue 21, he dies trying to break into Voodoo Ben's lair.
- Tony Tastey – Scud's first client as a freelancer, who eventually becomes the leader of the Cortese family cyborg mafia, which stars in the spin-off La Cosa Nostroid series.
- System – Brother of Drywall and supreme ruler of Hell, System was created along with his brothers to be the ultimate collection agent for Hell, harvesting as many treasures for Lucifer as humanly possible. However, System went rogue, deciding that the entire universe needed categorization, and has since been working to collect everything in existence and bring about the apocalypse.
- Mess – The first prototype stuff collector built for Lucifer. Mess resembles a walking collection of wooden filing cabinets. Mess uses magnets and suction cups to pick up stuff, but since not all stuff can be manipulated with these tools, his abilities are limited. He is also unable to categorize any of the stuff he collects. His boxy construction also makes him slow and clumsy. Due to these limitations, Mess was considered a failure. He was collected into System, along with his creator and Lucifer, in Drywall: Unzipped.
- Captain Jack Jones – When first introduced in the series, Jones was running a prison colony in the middle of a remote desert. This colony set the stage for Scud's first successful assassination attempt, during which he managed not only to decimate the prison personnel, but would later destroy the entire base by crashing an airship into the cliff on which it was based. Jones would later be hired by the mysterious Spidergod to use his remaining forces to track down Scud.
- Spidergod (a.k.a. Marvin) – The owner and manager of Marvin's Manikins, he is the one to take out the assassination order on Jeff in the first place. Later, he hires military forces in order to capture Scud, and later, Jeff, in an attempt to hold them hostage in order to bargain his way out of being sent to hell. Most recently, he was bankrupted by his war with Voodoo Ben, during which he also lost his legs.
- Horse – A trans-dimensional being that resembles a large children's rocking horse, Horse arrives to whisk Scud and Sussudio away from the battle between Voodoo Ben and Captain Jack Jones, seconds before the two are about to be annihilated. Horse transports the two around seemingly at random, appearing and disappearing at various times without any real given explanation, though Scud offers a few of his own. It is assumed that while the Eggs the Four Horsemen of the Apocalypse are used as the means to travel from Heaven to Earth, Horse is the way to move from Earth to Heaven, though this is never stated outright.
- Hank Gritt – The deceased movie-star father of Sussudio. His likeness can be seen throughout the series on various commercial products. He is also venerated by members of the Grittites cult. Hank's ethereal form appears during the four-issue finale of Scud, where he aids Scud and Drywall in their attack on Heaven.
- Hershell – An employee of Marvin's Manikins, who bought Scud from the vending machine and supplied him with the original mission.

== Spinoffs ==
Several comic book series were published by Fireman Press, all of which take place inside the Scud universe. These include:

- La Cosa Nostroid – Chronicles the rise and fall of Tony Tastey as he takes over the cyborg mafia. As he eliminates his enemies, he becomes increasingly paranoid and starts to kill off his allies and friends. Ended on a cliffhanger note. 9 issues released. The creative team includes Ed Clayton.
- Drywall: Unzipped – The origin of Scud's multi-zippered sidekick (one-shot).
- The Drywall and Oswald Show – The continued adventures of Drywall and Oswald. 2 issues released.
- Scud: Tales from the Vending Machine – An anthology of sorts, with each issue about a different Scud model. Each issue is created by a different creative team, including artists such as Trent Kaniuga (Creed), Jim Mahfood (Clerks), and Doug TenNapel (creator of Earthworm Jim). 5 issues released.

== Collections ==
Scud: The Disposable Assassin has been collected in trade paperback form. These include:

- Heavy 3PO – reprints #1–4
- Programmed for Damage – reprints #5–9
- Solid Gold Bomb – reprints #10–15
- The Yellow Horseman – reprints #16–20
- Scud The Disposable Assassin: The Whole Shebang! – reprints issues #1–24 and includes the one-shots Drywall: Unzipped and Black Octopus: Sexy Genius

== Other media ==
=== Merchandise ===
Scud: The Disposable Assassin inspired two video games, Scud: The Disposable Assassin (1997) for Sega Saturn and Scud: Industrial Evolution (1997) for PC. Both received mixed reviews.

A 6" Scud action figure was announced in 2006 as a part of Shocker Toys' Indie Spotlight line. The addition of the figure to the toy line was cited by Schrab as one of his motivations for wanting to finish issue #21 in his first video blog. The figure (with a variant Sol robot) was eventually released in 2009.

=== Proposed adaptations ===
There have been two attempts to adapt Scud into a film and TV show. A live-action feature film was optioned by producer Oliver Stone, but the option lapsed in the early 2000s. The second attempt was to adapt Scud into a TV series for MTV. It got as far as casting before being cancelled in 2004.

== In popular culture ==
In the Hey Arnold! episode "Dangerous Lumber", Helga refers to Arnold as "Scud" and later calls him "Arnold the assassin".

In the annual Homestar Runner animated Halloween special for 2008, the characters Pom-Pom and The Cheat dressed up as Scud and Drywall, respectively.

A copy of Scud: The Disposable Assassin #1 appears in the "Advanced Dungeons & Dragons" episode of the American television comedy series Community, created by series writer Dan Harmon. Scud himself was additionally seen in the background of the courtroom scene in "G.I. Jeff", an episode of Community that was based on G.I. Joe that was directed by Schrab.

In an episode of Cracked.com's After Hours series, Michael Swaim is dressed as Scud. Swaim himself often declared being a fan of Scud and all the Schrab oeuvre.

The second episode of The Real Animated Adventures of Doc and Mharti, a short series developed by Justin Roiland which served as the prototype that inspired Rick and Morty, features Scud the Disposable Assassin and depicts an animated copy of Scud: The Disposable Assassin #1. The episode also references Rob Schrab's hiatus between Issue #20 and the four-issue series finale.

Justin Roiland and Dan Harmon, the creators of Rick and Morty, stated at Stan Lee's L.A. Comic Con: Comikaze (2016) that reoccurring character Mr. Meeseeks was "ripped off" from Scud.
