= Channel 101 =

Film festival featuring shorts in the format of a TV pilot

- Country: United States (shows can be submitted from anywhere)
- Headquarters: The Downtown Independent (formerly Cinespace)

Programming
- Picture format: 16:9

History
- Launched: 2002
- Former names: Super Midnight Movie Show

Links
- Website: channel101.org

Channel 101 is a non-profit monthly short film festival in Los Angeles, which has a sister festival in New York City, Channel 101 NY. Channel 101 is a creation of Dan Harmon and Rob Schrab in which participants submit a short film in the format of a pilot under five minutes in length. The event is structured such that a panel of previously successful submitters choose what pilots are shown, and a live audience at The Downtown Independent decides which pilots continue as a series for the next screening in much the same way TV programs are rated and managed. According to the Channel 101 website, "Channel 101 is a chance to sit in the worn-out chair of the fat network exec, drunk on the blood of lowly artists whose right to exist is given in exchange for their ability to nourish... You run the network. You pick the programming."

== Concept ==
Roughly once a month, a screening for Channel 101 occurs at the Downtown Independent theater in Los Angeles, with usually ten shorts being screened. At the screening, the audience votes on which pilots they would like to see return. The top five shows are entered into the "prime time" slots on the Channel 101 website, and get to make a follow-up episode for the next screening. This process continues with new "episodes" being shown at each screening until one fails to make the top five, at which point the series is cancelled. Some successful shows can choose to be cancelled voluntarily by running over five minutes, disqualifying the show from continuing and leaving one last un-voted episode. Shows that fail to make the prime time spot are known as "failed pilots". An added benefit of having a prime time series is that prime time directors are part of the panel that decides which five new pilots will be shown alongside the five established shows from the previous screening. Shows that fail to make the screenings are known as "rejected pilots". Each calendar year of the festival is referred to as a "season", comprising 10 screenings, due to there being no December screening, plus month break "to allow the creators to rest" between spring/summer and the November screening, which is the yearly awards show, called the Incredibly Prestigious Achievement Award or "Channy", so named as a parody of Emmy. The Channy Awards have been held 8 times as of 2012.

Other rules have been tried out, most notably the "Chauncey" (named after director Chris Chauncey, the first to invoke the rule), wherein a director could overrule the voting panel and force their pilot to be screened, but the audience had the option of stopping the film at any time. Introduced in October 2003, it was done away with in November 2005 due to the popularity of the festival making it difficult for the honor system to be viable. Only one Chauncey made prime time (Dick Richards: Private Dick).

The name "Channel 101" is not meant to suggest an educational course; rather, it derives from the Hollywood convention for numbering a TV show's seasons and episodes. Since it is a festival for pilots, all of the screenings start off as episode "101" of their series.

== History ==
The idea for Channel 101 began in 2001, when Schrab invited several friends over for a screening of Jaws: The Revenge, but challenged them to bring a short film predicting what would happen in the film. In 2002, three more short film challenges were issued, but the group of viewers outgrew Schrab's living room. Instead, the screening was moved to the backroom of an LA nightclub. Additionally, friends of friends of the filmmakers were beginning to ask what this "festival" was called and how they could enter. In 2003, Schrab and Harmon named their creation the Super Midnight Movie Show and decided on a monthly screening and a five-minute format. However, they realized that once the show started growing, it would only be a matter of time before a large number of low-quality submissions were entered, and filmmakers would need to be turned away for time constraints. They decided to adopt a TV network-like ratings model where the audience votes on which films they like, and popular filmmakers were allowed to screen more films accordingly. In 2004, a pilot for a reality show about Channel 101 and its filmmakers was shopped to FX Networks, but was eventually passed on. A sketch comedy show based on the format of Channel 101 and executive-produced by Harmon and Schrab aired on VH1. The show was called Acceptable.TV and it began airing March 23, 2007.

The success of Channel 101 led to a sister film festival in New York City, Channel 101 NY.

== Notable shows ==
- Yacht Rock—A mockumentary series from J. D. Ryznar, Hunter D. Stair, and Lane Farnham, detailing fictional accounts of the lives of real "smooth music" musicians, particularly Kenny Loggins and Michael McDonald. Yacht Rock lasted 10 episodes as a primetime show from 2005 to 2006, but was sufficiently popular that the creators made two more episodes in 2008 and 2010.
- Chad Vader: Day Shift Manager—A video series that was created for Channel 101, but cancelled after two episodes. The creators, Matt Sloan and Aaron Yonda, went on to continue the series, and it became a series on YouTube where it was "featured" multiple times.
- Everything—An anthology show curated by Jason Whetzell and Danny Jelinek, featuring very short films by a variety of artists, introduced (briefly) by host Sophie Kipner. Everything is the longest-running prime time show on Channel 101, with 19 episodes between August 2009 and August 2011. The short Going to the Store picked up attention from BuzzFeed and The Huffington Post.
- The Parent Project—A show where parents created the stories for each episode by talking to their children over the phone. The first 10 episodes had creator and director Brett Weiner talking to his own mother and father. She quit on episode 10, and the show continued with guest subjects calling their families. The Parent Project was the second longest-running prime time show on Channel 101, with 15 episodes between October 2010 and May 2012.
- Classroom—A parody of after school specials by Tyler Spiers. The third longest-running prime time show, with five first-place episodes during its run of 13 between 2006 and 2007.
- ChooseYourOwnSelectAVision.TV—A parody of Channel 101 and Acceptable.TV from Dan Harmon and JD Ryznar, in which Internet viewers voted for one of three 30-second pilots to return in the next episode. It was voted back for a fifth month, but was cancelled when Harmon and Ryznar failed to complete the fifth episode on time. The most popular 30-second show was "Doctor Asshole", a parody of Doctor Who.
- Sex Teenagers—A comedy from Tom Kauffman and David Seger about a group of clueless teenagers. Episode 7 was shot and screened live in real time at the Channel 101 screening on October 29, 2011.
- Computerman—Starring Jack Black as a cross-breed of a man's DNA and his home computer.
- Time Belt—Chris Tallman's homage to Quantum Leap, featuring guest stars Paget Brewster and Jack Black – the latter in a crossover with Computerman. It was the last of the original prime time shows to be cancelled, lasting eight episodes from 2003 to 2004.
- House of Cosbys—An animated series by Justin Roiland about a fan and his collection of Bill Cosby clones. House of Cosbys was the first Channel 101 show to be ranked number one at three screenings in a row. It was cancelled and removed from the Channel 101 site after four episodes following a cease and desist letter from Cosby's lawyers, though a fifth episode was produced.
- Laser Fart—A superhero parody initially conceived as a joke submission by Dan Harmon, who also starred in the title role, Laser Fart became a surprise hit, lasting ten episodes in prime time from 2004 to 2005. Jack Black guest-starred in two episodes.
- Sockbaby—Starring John Soares and zero-budget martial arts from Doug TenNapel, the creator of Earthworm Jim.
- Planet Unicorn—Fictional stories revolve around three talking unicorns – Feathers, Cadillac, and Tom Cruise – who were created by an 8-year-old gay boy named Shannon.
- The 'Bu— A long-running prime-time teen soap opera in the style of The OC (11 episodes); also known for being filmed with new cast and crew for the last three episodes. The show was created by and starred The Lonely Island alongside Sarah Chalke.
- Gigabots—A Power Rangers parody made by the Duncan Brothers and Brenan Campbell.
- Brently and Mrs. Gould—Starring Brently Heilbron and his 85-year-old sidekick, Mrs. Gould (played by Jean Farber).
- Call Me Cobra—Starring Drew Carey, a show about a man who is mistaken for a professional killer, but takes the job for the money.
- Channel 101: The Musical—A fully orchestrated Broadway-style musical featuring Sarah Silverman and Happy Days' Donny Most.
- Most Extraordinary Space Investigations—Starring Dan Harmon, Sevan Najarian, Justin Roiland, and Sarah Silverman. It is noted for intentional mistakes, and purposely performing notable errors.
- Twigger's Holiday—Starring Rob Schrab, a colorful musical about a kid growing up.
- Shitbuster—Holds the record for most downloaded failed pilot. A revived short series starring Chris Romano as the original Shitbuster ran for 3 episodes.
- The Jogger—Cancelled pilot about a jogger solving problems. It garnered praise for the choreography and was later featured in Entertainment Weekly. The show later had its rights picked up by a production company.
- The Wright Stuff—Starring Ethan Phillips as President Theodore Roosevelt and created by Ford Austin and Scott Ingalls. It became the highest budgeted Channel 101 series at $5,000 per episode.
- I Love Vaginas—The creators (Justin Kuritzkes, Max Grey, and Nick Cuse (Note: Listed as one of the main creators in the video-only.)), at age 14, were the youngest to make it to the Channel 101 screening.
- The Serious Businessman—This show's challenge to its rejection by the voting panel created the "Chauncey" system.
- Cautionary Tales of Swords—Trip Fisk (Michael Ashe) tries warning the world of the dangers of sword ownership, and later, decides to fight the problem himself.
- Return to Supermans—A send-up of Turkish versions of American cinema (such as Turkish Star Wars). It was created by Aaron Moles and was also featured on G4's Attack of the Show!.
- Ultraforce—A three-episode science fiction action spectacular created by Jeremy Carter and Matt Gourley of Superego. It featured Derek Mears, Jeff Davis, and Chris Tallman.
- IKEA Heights—A melodrama shot entirely in the Burbank, California IKEA store, unbeknownst to the staff. It was featured in the LA Times
- Business—Was cancelled and came back as an animated series.
- Skateboard Cop—The only spin-off show to ever win Best Show. It ran for 10 episodes and won Best Show in 2014.
- Puppet Rapist—A comedy mini-series about a world where muppet-like puppets co-exist with humans, following the story of a sex offender after he is released from prison, becoming embroiled in a conspiracy to wipe out humanity. It starred Jake Schreier and was an early work by screenwriter Christopher D. Ford
- Kill The Baby—Mayhem ensues when a man makes the decision to kill his infant child.
- The Real Animated Adventures of Doc and Mharti—A risqué Back to the Future parody made in response to Justin Roiland's forced cancellation of his previous show House of Cosbys. It ended up later serving as the basis for Harmon and Roiland's popular animated series Rick and Morty.
- Pop-It—A dark comedy driven by special effects, body horror, and heavy atmosphere.
- Somewhere in Highland Park—Two friends navigate surreal situations in their Highland Park neighborhood.
- Channel 101—A satire of the Channel 101 institution in the context of the #MeToo movement that takes particular aim at the white male-dominated world of comedy and film. It features founder Dan Harmon's first performance on a 101 series in almost ten years when he guest starred in episode 3.
- Daryl—A dark comedy parody of Dexter starring Dan Harmon as the title character, a therapist who prevents people from becoming serial killers by raping them as babies. The sketch resurfacing in late July 2018 led to Harmon deleting his Twitter account.

== Notable personalities ==
- Jack Black: Computerman, Time Belt, Laser Fart, Exposure, Water and Power
- Drew Carey: Call Me Cobra, Yacht Rock
- Sarah Chalke: The 'Bu
- Jeff Davis: Laser Fart, House of Cosbys, Ultraforce
- Flavor Flav: Six Months to Live
- Kato Kaelin: Call Me Cobra
- Jason Lee: Yacht Rock
- Bob Odenkirk: Your Magic Touched Me: Nights
- Sarah Silverman: MESI, Channel 101: The Musical
- David Faustino: Skateboardpunks, The Amazing Christopher
- Ethan Phillips: The Wright Stuff
- The Lonely Island: The 'Bu, ITV Countdown, House of Cosbys
- Jimmy Kimmel: MESI
- Paget Brewster: Time Belt
- Chris Tallman: Time Belt, The Wright Stuff, Ultraforce
- Donny Most: Channel 101: The Musical
- Derek Mears: Nightstalkers, Ultraforce, My Rockstar, Vengeance
- Chevy Chase: Water and Power
- Joel McHale: Water and Power
- John Oliver: Water and Power
- Joel Hodgson: Water and Power
- Tommy Wiseau: Playboy Adventures
- Paul F. Tompkins: Sunday Detective Film Theater
- Sandeep Parikh: Raptor, Blood Oath of Three Men and a Baby.
- Felicia Day: Blood Oath of Three Men and a Baby.
- Brian Posehn: Call Me Cobra
- Steve Agee: Yacht Rock, Making Mistakes, Wade and Eric Sold a Movie, Car-Jumper, Reporters
- Fred Stoller: Groove Fighters, 2 Girls 1 Cup The Show, Tales From Railroad Times
- Tim Heidecker: House of Cosbys, Documentary: The Series, My 2 Fathers
- Eric Wareheim: My 2 Fathers
- Aziz Ansari: Water and Power
- Kumail Nanjiani: Googy
- Randall Park: The Food, IKEA Heights, Baby Mentalist
