= Harmontown =

Comedy podcast from 2012 to 2019

- Podcast logo
- Genre: Comedy, entertainment, talk
- Country of origin: United States
- Language: English

Creative team
- Created by: Dan Harmon

Cast and voices
- Hosted by: Dan Harmon; Jeff B. Davis

Production
- Length: 60–120 minutes

Publication
- No. of episodes: 360
- Original release: June 16, 2012 – December 3, 2019
- Provider: Feral Audio (2012–2017); Starburns Audio (2018–2019)

Related
- Website: harmontown.com

Harmontown is a comedy podcast that aired weekly from June 16, 2012 to December 3, 2019. It was hosted by writer Dan Harmon, best known as the creator of the television series Community and the co-creator of Rick and Morty, along with actor Jeff B. Davis, best known for his work on the improvisational comedy series Whose Line Is It Anyway? Harmontown began as a monthly live comedy show in Los Angeles, California, at the NerdMelt Showroom on May 23, 2011, but the show became weekly after Harmon was fired from Community. Since mid-2012, each episode of Harmontown had been recorded and released as a podcast, first by Feral Audio through 2017, then Starburns Audio starting in 2018.

The podcast featured many guest appearances, including Game Grumps, Emily V. Gordon, Kumail Nanjiani, Greg Proops, Aubrey Plaza, Bobcat Goldthwait, Rob Schrab, Curtis Armstrong, Patton Oswalt, Jason Sudeikis, Dana Carvey, Felicia Day, Robin Williams, Mitch Hurwitz, Joel McHale, Rob Corddry, John Mayer, Eric Idle, Logic, and Steve Agee.

On March 8, 2014, an eponymous documentary about the podcast premiered at the South by Southwest Film Festival.

== Premise ==
The original premise of Harmontown began with Harmon's and Davis's attempts to discuss how to successfully eliminate the flaws of society and create a utopia (which they claimed could be addressed with the creation of a lunar colony) in front of a live audience. The show evolved into what Harmon and Davis call "live therapy sessions" for Harmon, as he discussed with Davis a variety of topics, from anecdotes about his family and work to commentaries on movies, social issues, and scandals.

== Format and structure ==
Harmontown was not scripted; it was largely improvisational. The show frequently featured many guests to help drive the discussion. On its fifth airing, the show began having a regular Dungeons & Dragons (D&D) session at the end of each episode. This led to the introduction of Game Master Spencer Crittenden, who led their D&D segments, having extensive knowledge of the game. Crittenden happened to be an audience member when Harmon and Davis asked for assistance from the crowd with how to play D&D. Crittenden gradually became a part of the main cast. He was then hired as an assistant to Dan Harmon.

Beginning in 2015, with episode #131 "Dirty Little Potato People", the Dungeons & Dragons segment was replaced with a Shadowrun game session, placed towards the end of the episodes and for a similar length as the D&D segment. Crittenden was also the gamemaster for this segment, with guests optionally filling the roles of some characters in the campaign.

From October 2017 to June 2018, the podcast was recorded without an audience due to permit issues at Starburns Studios. The show was recorded at the Starburns Castle, a studio owned by Starburns Industries. Harmontown returned to live audience format in June 2018 at Dynasty Typewriter at The Hayworth, in Westlake, LA.

When Davis was unavailable, guest comptrollers included Rob Schrab, Erin McGathy, Kumail Nanjiani, Duncan Trussell, and Brandon Johnson, who eventually became Davis's regular replacement near the end of the podcast's run. Occasionally, special guests would serve as comptroller, including Mitchell Hurwitz, Bobcat Goldthwait, and—on the Harmontown movie tour—Gilbert Gottfried, Dino Stamatopoulos, Steve Agee, and LeVar Burton.

== Tour and documentary ==
From January 10–30, 2013, Harmontown went on a national tour, posting new episodes from different cities. The tour was the subject of a documentary, also called Harmontown, which was produced by Neil Berkeley. The documentary premiered at the SXSW Film Festival on March 8, 2014.

In 2016, Harmontown toured Australia.

== Cast and crew ==
- Dan Harmon: Mayor of Harmontown
- Jeff Davis: "Comptroller"
- Spencer Crittenden: Dungeon Master
- Erin McGathy: recurring guest and comptroller
- Rob Schrab: recurring guest and comptroller
- Brandon Johnson: recurring guest and comptroller
- Kumail Nanjiani: recurring guest and comptroller
- DeMorge Brown: recurring guest
- Dustin Marshall: podcast producer 2011-2016, founder of Feral Audio
- Steve Levy: producer
- Kristian Boruff: live director
- Sarah Hill: technical coordinator
- Kevin Day: web producer

== Community controversy ==
Harmon's openness on Harmontown frequently proved controversial. Following season 3 of Community, Sony fired Harmon as show-runner, and many fans noticed the show's tonal shift in season 4 with displeasure. Harmon avoided watching season 4 of his former show for some time, but after finally viewing it, he expressed his opinion of the season during a Harmontown episode. Harmon made comments referencing Jeffrey Dahmer (a convicted serial killer and cannibal), and described his experience of watching the season as "like flipping through Instagrams and watching your girlfriend just blow a million [other guys]."

== Reception ==
The A.V. Club wrote that "The podcast is for fans only, but for that undervalued group, it's essential listening." CraveOnline wrote of the podcast: "If you're a Community fan, you're not going to want to miss the brains behind the show. If you're a comedy fan, you're not going to want to miss the show because it is, in all seriousness, the best comedy podcast out there. Harmon is a fantastic talker and storyteller and Davis is just as fantastic to listen to."
