= Heat Vision and Jack =

Television pilot featuring Jack Black and Owen Wilson

- Genre: Comedy; Science fiction
- Created by: Rob Schrab; Dan Harmon
- Written by: Rob Schrab; Dan Harmon
- Directed by: Ben Stiller
- Starring: Jack Black; Ron Silver
- Voices of: Owen Wilson
- Opening theme: "Situation" by Tom Jones
- Country of origin: United States
- Original language: English

Production
- Executive producers: Ben Stiller; Robert Greenblatt; David Janollari
- Producer: Steve Beers
- Cinematography: Clyde Smith
- Editor: Steve Welch
- Running time: 30 minutes
- Production companies: The Greenblatt Janollari Studio; Red Hour Productions

Original release
- Network: Fox
- Release: January 10, 1999

Heat Vision and Jack is an unaired 1999 American comedy science fiction television pilot created and written by Rob Schrab and Dan Harmon, directed by Ben Stiller, and starring Jack Black, Owen Wilson, and Ron Silver. The pilot was originally ordered by Fox, which ultimately did not order it to series. While the show was not picked up, the pilot became a cult classic and gained an online following.

== Plot ==
The pilot opens with Ben Stiller talking about the cancelled Ben Stiller Show, the Emmy Award he won for the show, and sarcastically criticizing George Lucas for having not won an Emmy. After a short sting, Heat Vision then opens with a title sequence explaining how Jack gained his new powers, and how Heat Vision came into existence.

== Cast and characters ==
=== Main ===
- Jack Black as Jack Austin, a former astronaut. He was exposed to inappropriate levels of solar energy, giving him superintelligence. He appears to lose this intelligence at night, requiring only Earth-normal levels of daylight to reactivate it. His catchphrases are "I know EVERYTHING!" and "Knowledge is power... for real."
- Owen Wilson as Heat Vision, a talking motorcycle. He was created when Jack's unemployed roommate Doug was shot by an experimental ray gun, causing him to merge with his motorcycle. He is capable of speech and can fight by ramming into opponents. He is unable to use doorknobs and is unable to right himself if pushed over.
- Ron Silver as himself, the main villain. He works for NASA, and will stop at nothing to capture or kill Jack Austin, but he also dabbles in acting, perhaps as a diversion, perhaps as a cover. He appears to be invulnerable, shrugging off the threat of being shot and later displaying great annoyance but no injury or pain when he is actually shot.

=== Guest ===
- Christine Taylor as The Sheriff
- Vincent Schiavelli as Frank, a cook who becomes possessed by an alien broadcast and thereafter calls himself Paragon
- O-Lan Jones as Patrice
- Sy Richardson as Doctor

== Legacy ==
Heat Vision was featured as a part of the mockumentary Tropic Thunder: Rain of Madness, only stating that the character of "Jeff Portnoy" played the role of Jack Austin.

In a March 27, 2007 interview, Rob Schrab stated that a script for the Heat Vision and Jack feature film was in the works.
