= Mathlete's Feat =

- The Simpsons episode
- Episode no.: Season 26; Episode 22
- Directed by: Mike Frank Polcino
- Written by: Michael Price
- Production code: TABF16
- Original air date: May 17, 2015

Guest appearances
- Justin Roiland as Rick and Morty

Episode features
- Chalkboard gag: During the episode, Bart starts writing "I will not" before the chalkboard is taken away and replaced with an electronic one. Putting the chalk in his pocket, Bart writes "I will not fight the future" with his finger once, then copies it multiple times over and inverts the screen.
- Couch gag: Rick and Morty crash into the living room, killing the Simpson family, and attempt to clone them.

Episode chronology
← Previous "Bull-E"	Next → "Every Man's Dream"
- The Simpsons season 26

"Mathlete's Feat" is the twenty-second and final episode of the twenty-sixth season of the American animated television series The Simpsons, and the 574th overall episode of the series. The episode was directed by Mike Frank Polcino and written by Michael Price. It originally aired on the Fox network in the United States on May 17, 2015.

In this episode, Lisa suggests turning the school into a Waldorf school when its electronics are ruined, and Groundskeeper Willie adds Bart to the math team due to his throwing accuracy. Justin Roiland reprises his roles as Rick Sanchez and Morty Smith from the television series Rick and Morty in the couch gag. The episode received mixed reviews.

== Plot ==
The math teams from Springfield Elementary and Waverly Hills Elementary compete against each other in an event organized by Benjamin, Doug and Gary. Lisa boasts that Springfield Elementary will surprise everyone at the meet; her prediction comes true when the team fails to score any points at all. She laments the fact that Waverly Hills Elementary can afford the newest educational technology, while her school uses antiquated tools due to its inadequate budget.

The three sponsors make a large donation to Springfield Elementary, prompting Principal Skinner to install upgraded equipment in all the classrooms and have the old textbooks destroyed. However, electrical malfunctions in the computer servers cause all the new devices to overload and break down, leaving the teachers with nothing they can use to lead their classes. As Miss Hoover tries to show her students an educational video on her cell phone, Lisa notices Groundskeeper Willie using a knotted rope to measure the dimensions of a field outside. The sight inspires her to suggest that Springfield Elementary become a Waldorf school, with an emphasis on creative play and hands-on activities.

The children enjoy the new system, and Willie is named as coach of the math team. Upon realizing that he is being grossly underpaid for his work, he begins chasing Superintendent Chalmers around the school. Bart throws an egg and hits Chalmers in the head, causing him to run his car into a tree; Willie is so impressed by the accuracy of the throw that he names Bart as captain of the math team. During a rematch against Waverly Hills Elementary, Bart is shocked to find that he is expected to do actual math. With the score tied at 29-29, he nevertheless scores the winning point for Springfield Elementary by using the fringe of hair on Homer's head to solve the last problem. Lisa is overjoyed at the victory but also horrified when Willie explains that his measuring rope was originally created as a means to torture and kill sheep thieves.

== Production ==
On September 26, 2014; while in a conference at the London Science Museum, Al Jean told that there would be a future episode with the following plot: "It will have Lisa on a math team and features the most complicated math jokes we [The Simpsons crew] can think of." This episode's couch gag features a crossover with the animated series Rick and Morty. Dan Harmon wrote the first draft of the sequence with Justin Roiland performing rewrites. A sequence during the second Mathlympics scene features a section of the Kate Bush song "π" from her album Aerial. Busted song "Year 3000" features during the sequence where the new technology is implemented in the school.

== Reception ==
The episode received a 1.3 rating and was watched by a total of 2.82 million people.

The episode received mixed reviews with praise going to the couch gag with Rick and Morty.

Dennis Perkins of The A.V. Club gave the episode a D, saying "as the final act of "Mathlete's Feat", the final episode of the 26th season of The Simpsons went to commercial, I was genuinely pissed at how disjointed, lazy, and downright lousy this season finale was."

Jesse Schedeen of IGN gave the episode a 7.3/10, ultimately saying the episode was unfocused but was still amusing.
