= Acceptable.TV =

- Created by: Dan Harmon
- Opening theme: Allen Simpson
- Ending theme: Allen Simpson
- Country of origin: United States
- Original language: English
- No. of seasons: 1
- No. of episodes: 8

Production
- Executive producer: Jack Black
- Running time: 22 minutes
- Production companies: Vanity Card Productions; VH1 Productions

Original release
- Network: VH1
- Release: March 23 – May 11, 2007

Acceptable.TV is a television program created by Dan Harmon and Rob Schrab that aired on VH1 from March 23 to May 11, 2007. Each show was composed of several mini-episodes created by the Acceptable.TV staff, with one mini-episode that was submitted by a viewer. After each episode viewers would be able to vote online for their two favorites. The two that received the most votes will be continued in the following episode, and the remaining three would be cancelled and replaced by new mini-shows. The show was adapted from Harmon and Schrab's Channel 101 screenings, and the cast was composed of various Channel 101 contributors.

The series is also known for the segments Mr. Sprinkles, created by Justin Roiland and produced by Justin Roiland's Solo Vanity Card Productions!, known for the creation of Adult Swim's Rick and Morty.

Users would also be able to submit their own 2.5 minute mini-episodes. Each week five of the user-created shows would be selected by the show's creators and people would be allowed to vote for their favorite user-created episode. The mini-episode with the highest votes would air on television alongside the staff created mini-episodes.

== Reception ==
Critical reception for the show was mixed, with Variety and The New York Times both panning the show overall. The Los Angeles Times commented that the episodes focused more on being the "next 'it' spoof" rather than on the "original story and character", which detracted from the overall idea of the show. Harmon commented on the show's poor reception, saying that "Even the worst reviews, they always praise one or two of our sketches and say the other things are just shit. Well, that's what you're supposed to think. You're supposed to vote for what you like."

== List of episodes ==
Episode 1 (March 23, 2007)

1. "Joke Chasers"
2. "Who Farted"
3. "Homeless James Bond"
4. "The Teensies"
5. "Mister Sprinkles"

Web winner: "Anna Manesia" - Created by Kate Freund

Episode 2 (March 30, 2007)

1. "Homeless James Bond" - Episode 2
2. "Operation Kitten Calendar"
3. "Medical Hospital"
4. "Cirque De Soleil: Sex Crime Investigation"
5. "Mister Sprinkles" - Episode 2

Web winner: "L33t Haxxors" - Created by Ben Pluimer

Episode 3 (April 6, 2007)

1. "Mister Sprinkles" - Episode 3
2. "Yo! Murder He Rapped"
3. "Shady Acres"
4. "Pedophile Gladiators"
5. "Operation Kitten Calendar" - Episode 2

Web winner: "L33t Haxxors" - Episode 2 - Created by Ben Pluimer

Episode 4 (April 13, 2007)

1. "Lord of the Phils"
2. "Drunk Home Makeover"
3. "Mister Sprinkles" - Episode 4
4. "Law & Order: Production Unit"
5. "Operation Kitten Calendar" - Episode 3

Web winner: "L33t Haxxors" - Episode 3 - Created by Ben Pluimer

Episode 5 (April 20, 2007)

1. "Gayliens"
2. "Mister Sprinkles" - Episode 5
3. "Federal Bureau of Abdullah"
4. "The Highfiver"
5. "Operation Kitten Calendar" - Episode 4

Web winner: "Psychic Priest Detective" - Created by Wade Randolph

Episode 6 (April 27, 2007)

1. "Red Carpet Bros"
2. "Mister Sprinkles" - Episode 6
3. "Gar"
4. "Who's Gonna Train Me?"
5. "Operation Kitten Calendar" - Episode 5 (last episode due to end of 'season')

Web winner: "McCourt's in Session" - Created by BlameSociety

Episode 7 (May 4, 2007)

1. "Sin Trek"
2. "Who's Gonna Train Me?" - Episode 2
3. "I'm Not Racist"
4. "Price of Dollars"
5. "Mister Sprinkles" - Episode 7

Web winner: "The Rappersons" - Created by Fun, INC.

Episode 8 (May 11, 2007)

1. "I'm Not Racist" - Episode 2
2. "Kosbees"
3. "Cursed Tape Review" "Speedboat Confessions" "Radical Female Hackers"
4. "Who's Gonna Train Me?" - Episode 3
5. "Mister Sprinkles" - Episode 8

Web winner: "The Rappersons" - Episode 2 - Created by Fun, INC.
