= Dan Harmon =

American screenwriter (born 1973)

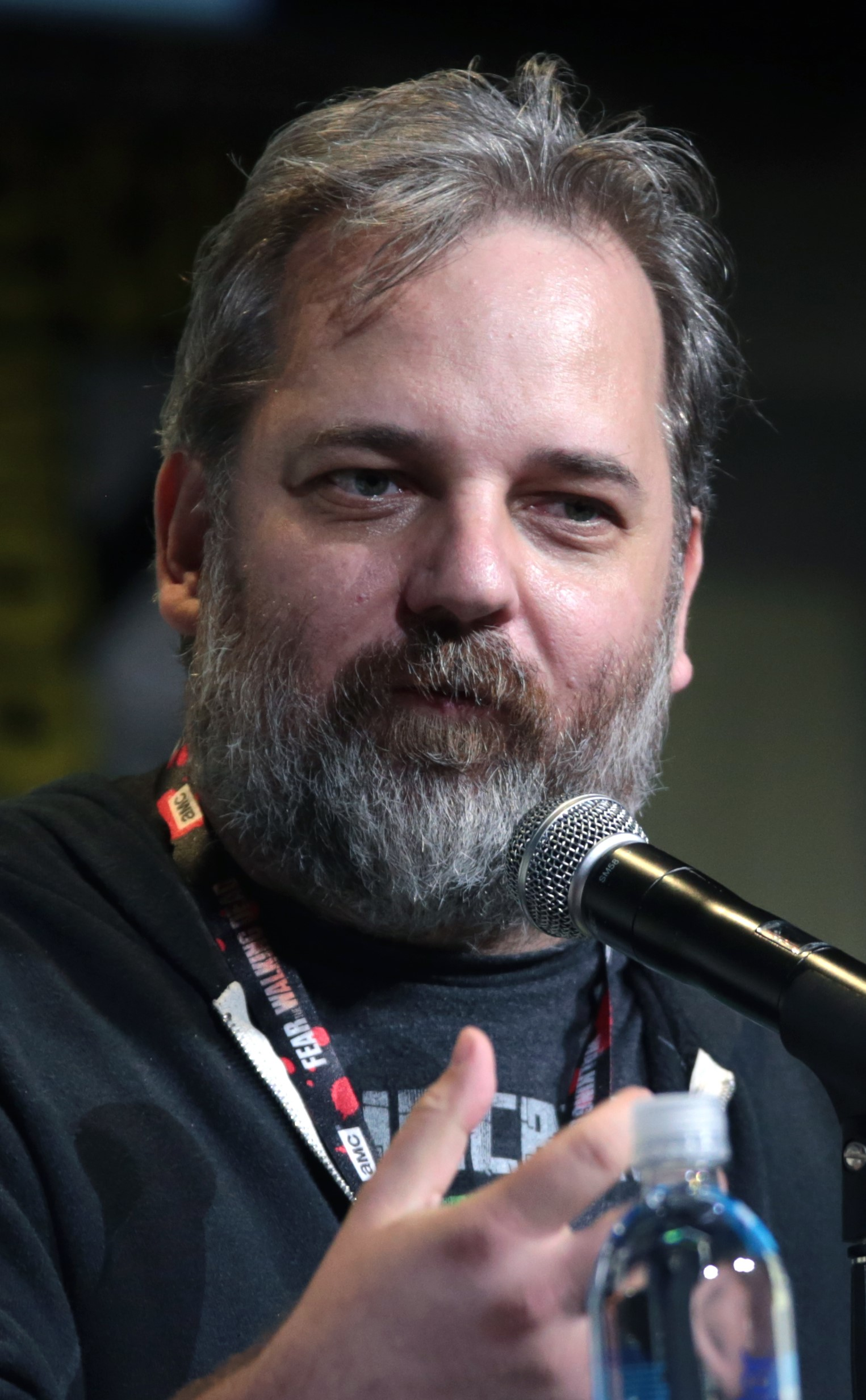
- Harmon in 2016
- Born: Daniel James Harmon; January 3, 1973 (age 53); Milwaukee, Wisconsin, U.S.
- Education: Marquette University
- Occupations: Writer; producer; actor
- Years active: 1996–present
- Spouse: Erin McGathy (m. 2014; div. 2015)
- Partner(s): Cody Heller (2016–present; engaged)

Daniel James Harmon (born January 3, 1973) is an American television writer, producer, and actor. He is best known as the creator and producer of the NBC sitcom Community (2009–2015), creator and host of the comedy podcast Harmontown (2012–2019), and co-creator of the Adult Swim animated sitcom Rick and Morty (2013–present) and its subsequent franchise along with Justin Roiland. Harmon is also co-founder of the alternative television network and website Channel 101 along with Rob Schrab, and creator of the Fox animated sitcom Krapopolis (2023–present).

== Early life ==
Daniel James Harmon was born in Milwaukee, Wisconsin, on January 3, 1973. He graduated from Brown Deer High School in Brown Deer, Wisconsin, and attended Marquette University. He briefly attended Glendale Community College in Glendale, California, an experience which would later form the basis of his sitcom Community.

== Career ==
=== Early career (1996–2008) ===
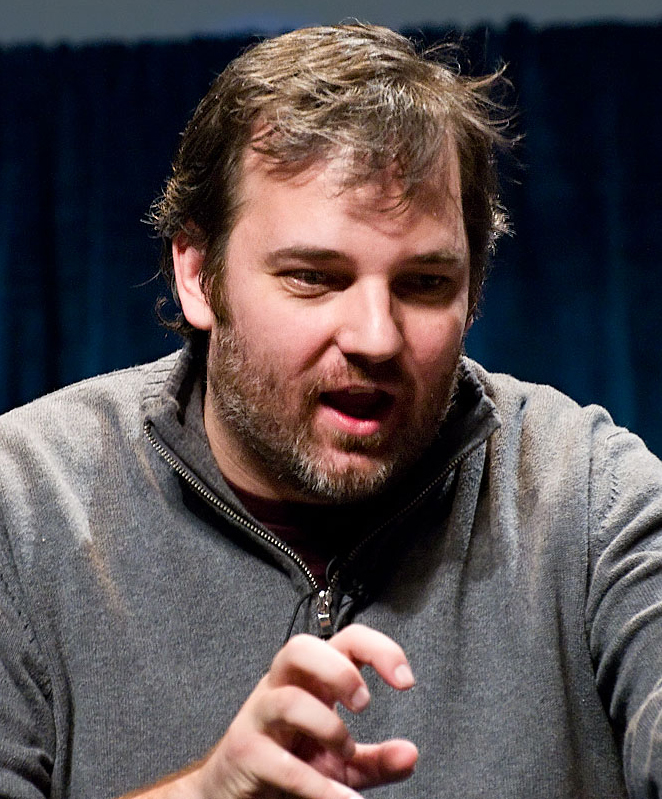
Harmon in March 2010

Harmon was a member of ComedySportz in Milwaukee, alongside Rob Schrab, a member of the sketch troupe The Dead Alewives. They produced an album, Take Down the Grand Master, in 1996. Harmon frequently appeared at Milwaukee's Safehouse free comedy stage early in his career. A notable routine was a song about masturbation.

Harmon co-created the television pilot Heat Vision and Jack (starring Owen Wilson and Jack Black) and several Channel 101 shows, some featuring Black, Drew Carey, and Sarah Silverman. He co-created Comedy Central's The Sarah Silverman Program and served as head writer for several episodes.

Harmon portrayed a highly fictionalized version of Ted Templeman on two episodes of the Channel 101 web series Yacht Rock, a satirical history of soft rock, featuring stories about Templeman's collaborations with The Doobie Brothers, Michael McDonald and Van Halen. He was the creator, executive producer, and a featured performer in Acceptable.TV, a Channel 101-based sketch show airing for eight episodes in March 2007 on VH1. He and Rob Schrab co-wrote the screenplay for the Academy Award-nominated film Monster House. He is credited with writing part of Rob Schrab's comic book series Scud: The Disposable Assassin, as well as the spin-off comic series La Cosa Nostroid.

=== Community (2009–2012; 2014–2015) ===
In 2009, Harmon's sitcom Community, inspired by his own community college experiences, was picked up by NBC to be in its fall lineup. Harmon served as executive producer and showrunner for three seasons until May 18, 2012, when it was announced that Harmon was being terminated from his position on Community as a result of creative conflicts between himself and Sony executives. On June 1, 2013, Harmon announced that he would be returning to Community, serving as co-showrunner along with Chris McKenna; this was confirmed by Sony Pictures on June 10. NBC cancelled the show after its fifth season in May 2014, after which Harmon announced on June 30, 2014, that Yahoo! had renewed the series for a 13-episode sixth season to air online on Yahoo! Screen. In a 2024 interview, returning star Yvette Nicole Brown confirmed that a script for a Community movie is ready, and production is in the works.

=== Harmontown and Harmonquest (2011–2019) ===
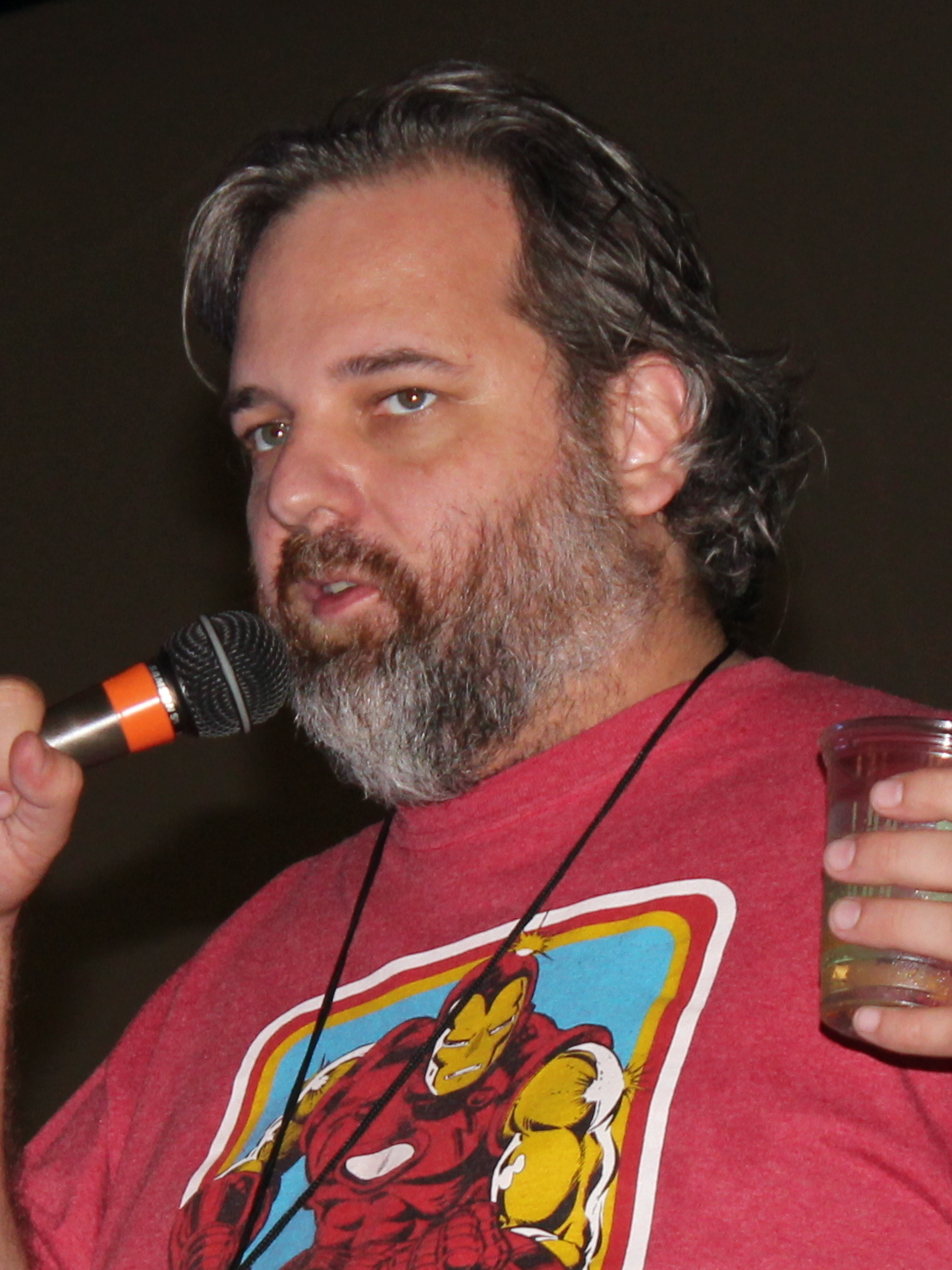
Harmon in 2014

On May 23, 2011, Harmon and Jeff B. Davis began co-hosting Harmontown, a monthly live comedy show and podcast at Meltdown Comics in Hollywood. After Harmon's firing from Community, the show became weekly. Harmontown has included a regular segment where the hosts played an ongoing campaign of pen-and-paper role-playing games, first Dungeons & Dragons, and later Shadowrun, with the help of show Game Master Spencer Crittenden. The segment inspired the Seeso original animated series HarmonQuest. The show has included multiple celebrity guests. Harmon and Davis took the show on tour in early 2013, which was the subject of a documentary. The documentary, also called Harmontown, was produced by director Neil Berkeley that follows Harmon, Davis, McGathy, and Crittenden. It premiered at the Austin Film Festival SXSW on March 8, 2014. On September 10, 2019, the Harmontown Twitter account announced that the podcast would be coming to an end, and its final episode was published on December 5, 2019.

=== Starburns Industries (2010–2020) ===
During the first season of Community, Harmon also co-founded Starburns Industries with several people including Dino Stamatopoulos, who played a character called Star-Burns on Community. In its first year, the company produced a stop-motion episode of Community which garnered the company an Emmy Award for Outstanding Achievement in Animation. Starburns Industries was then involved in the creation of Rick and Morty and animated films Anomalisa and Bubbles. It has also produced season 2 of Mary Shelley's Frankenhole and the special Beforel Orel for Adult Swim, HarmonQuest for Seeso and VRV and Animals for HBO.

In 2013, Harmon published the book You'll Be Perfect When You're Dead.

Harmon left the company in 2020. The studio's output declined steadily after the departure, with their only released projects after 2020 being The Freak Brothers and Slippin' Jimmy.

In February 2026, it was announced that Starburns Industries would produce the movie adaptation of George Saunders's Booker Prize–winning novel Lincoln in the Bardo.

=== Rick and Morty (2013–present) ===
Harmon and co-showrunner Justin Roiland began developing ideas for an animated show during Harmon's yearlong break from Community. For its fall 2012 season, Adult Swim ordered a 30-minute animated pilot from Harmon and Roiland. The pilot, Rick and Morty, is about the adventures of a brilliant but mean-spirited inventor and his less-than-genius grandson. The show premiered on December 2, 2013, and was renewed for second and third seasons. In May 2018, Rick and Morty was renewed for a further 70 episodes after Harmon and Roiland came to an agreement with Adult Swim. The series' fourth season concluded in May 2020. Harmon voiced the recurring character of Bird Person. In January 2023, Harmon became the sole remaining creator after Roiland was dismissed from the series amidst domestic assault charges.

=== The Sirens of Titan ===
It was announced through the online site The A.V. Club in July 2017 that Harmon and Evan Katz would adapt Kurt Vonnegut's 1959 novel The Sirens of Titan into a television series. As of October 2021, no more details have been released.

=== Krapopolis (2023–present) ===
In June 2020, it was announced that Fox greenlit an animated comedy series from Harmon. The series was to be set in Ancient Greece and is a co-production between Fox Entertainment and Bento Box Entertainment. On May 17, 2021, it was announced that the series would be titled Krapopolis. The series premiered on September 24, 2023, and concluded on May 19, 2024. In July 2024, Fox renewed the series for a fourth season. In May 2025, the series was renewed for a fifth season, ahead of the season 2 finale and the season 3 premiere. The third season premiered on September 28, 2025.

== Writing style ==
=== "Story circle" technique ===
Harmon adapted the hero's journey, a well-known storytelling framework, for use in television; he calls this technique the "story circle". He began developing the technique while stuck on a screenplay in the late 1990s, and wanted to codify the storytelling process to unveil the "structure" that powers movies and TV shows. He said, "I was thinking, there must be some symmetry to this. Some simplicity." While working on Channel 101, he found that many of the directors he was working with claimed that they were unable to write plots for television shows. This prompted him to simplify Joseph Campbell's structure of the hero's journey into a circular eight-step process that would reliably produce coherent stories.

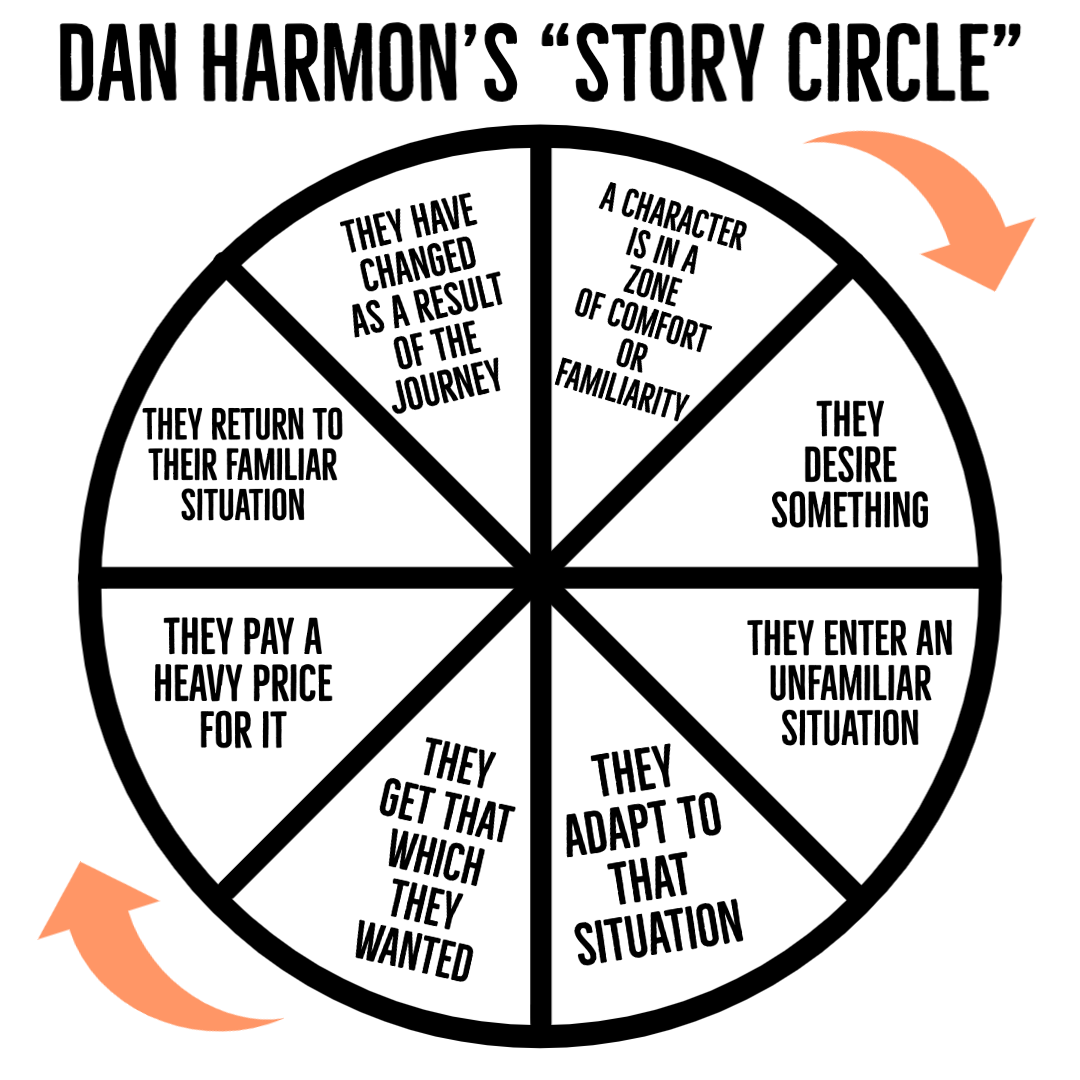
Dan Harmon's "Story Circle"

The story circle can supposedly be applied to all stories. Harmon uses it whenever he is writing a new story, saying, "I can't not see that circle. It's tattooed on my brain." The circle is divided into eight segments, each representing a stage of the plot: a character is introduced, wants something, enters a new environment, adapts to that environment, achieves their goal, encounters problems as a result of this, leaves that world, and is changed as a result. He writes the steps as follows:

1. A character is in a zone of comfort or familiarity.
2. They desire something.
3. They enter an unfamiliar situation.
4. They adapt to that situation.
5. They get that which they wanted.
6. They pay a heavy price for it.
7. They return to their familiar situation.
8. They have changed as a result of the journey.

Campbell's structure of the hero's journey is the main influence in Harmon's technique. In a blog post detailing the second sector of the circle, Harmon explained, "The point of this part of the circle is, our protagonist has been thrown into the water and now it's sink or swim. In Hero with a Thousand Faces, Campbell actually evokes the image of a digestive tract, breaking the hero down, divesting him of neuroses, stripping him of fear and desire. There's no room for bullshit in the unconscious basement. Asthma inhalers, eyeglasses, credit cards, fratty boyfriends, promotions, toupees, and cell phones can't save you here. The purpose here has become refreshingly—and frighteningly—simple." The hero's journey has been adapted for screen and television writing before, most notably by former Disney developmental executive Christopher Vogler in his book The Writer's Journey: Mythic Structure for Writers. Harmon has noted this book as an influence on the technique, as well as the work of Syd Field. Star Wars is an example of a film that consciously set out to use the hero's journey as a template for storytelling success.

Harmon states that this circular structure of storytelling can be applied both to film and TV, suggesting in a Channel 101 blog that only the final intentions are different: "A feature film's job is to send you out of the theatre on a high in 90 minutes. Television's job is to keep you glued to the television for your entire life. This doesn't entail making stories any less circular (TV circles are so circular they're sometimes irritatingly predictable). It just means that the focus of step 8 is less riling-things-up and more getting-things-back-to-where-they-started." He has used the story circle technique extensively throughout projects such as Community and Rick and Morty. In an interview with Collider, writer Adam Chitwood said, "Rick and Morty debuted in 2013 to a serious degree of anticipation, as it marked a new animated venture for Community creator Dan Harmon, but it was the marriage of Harmon's adeptness for structure and character and co-creator Justin Roiland's insanely creative/sometimes insane mind that made Rick and Morty much more than just another animated TV series for adults."

=== Influences ===
In an interview with Vulture, Harmon named a number of films, television shows, books, and artists that have shaped his writing style. This includes the films RoboCop and Network; the television shows Cheers, Mr. Show, Arrested Development, Second City Television, and Twin Peaks; the books Slaughterhouse-Five and The Hitchhiker's Guide to the Galaxy; the play Sexual Perversity in Chicago; and writers, artists, and comedians including Garry Shandling, George Lucas, Spalding Gray, Charlie Kaufman, Woody Allen, Tom Kenny, and Chris Elliott.

In the same Vulture interview, Harmon mentioned Dungeons & Dragons, musician Tori Amos, and evolutionary anthropologist Elaine Morgan as influences. He singled out Morgan's aquatic ape hypothesis, calling it a "peaceful, interesting, mythical concept, and a scientific one, that maybe the origin of Homo sapiens was kind of a fairy tale". For Rick and Morty, Harmon and co-creator Justin Roiland listed a number of influences on the show's style, including, Saturday Night Live, The Hitchhiker's Guide to the Galaxy, Doctor Who, and the cult sci-fi film Zardoz.

== Awards ==
In July 2009, Harmon was nominated in two Emmy categories for his part in writing the 81st Academy Awards telecast: Outstanding Writing for a Variety Special and Outstanding Original Music and Lyrics, the latter of which he was awarded for "Hugh Jackman Opening Number" at the 61st Primetime Emmy Awards.

In 2018 and 2020, Harmon won the Emmy for "Outstanding Animated Program" as the executive producer of Rick and Morty.

He was also nominated with Chris McKenna for a Hugo award for writing the Community episode, "Remedial Chaos Theory".

== Personal life ==
In 2011, while writing the character Abed for Community, Harmon realized through researching the character's traits that he might be on the autism spectrum. A doctor he consulted with agreed. On a podcast hosted by Kevin Pollak, he said, "I know I'm not normal, but I think the important thing is that [...] I started to discover that I had a lot more in common with Abed than I did with Jeff."

Harmon proposed to his girlfriend Erin McGathy in December 2013, and they were married in November 2014. They announced they were divorcing in October 2015. In 2016, Harmon started dating TV writer Cody Heller. In January 2019, Heller proposed to Harmon and the couple is now engaged. Heller adapted a real-life experience with Harmon into the TV series Dummy, starring Anna Kendrick as Heller and Donal Logue as Harmon.

On January 2, 2018, Harmon alluded to sexual misconduct from himself towards other people. Megan Ganz, a writer who worked with him on Community, named herself as a victim of his misconduct. In response to his apology and willingness to make things right, Ganz said that while she appreciated his gestures, she was not yet ready to forgive him. After the exchange, he made a lengthy apology on his podcast Harmontown and went into detail about his wrongdoings, which included making advances on Ganz and then mistreating her after she turned him down. Ganz ultimately accepted his apology; she said that she felt vindicated by his admission, called it a "masterclass in how to apologize", and urged her Twitter followers to listen to it.

In July 2018, Harmon received criticism when a comedy skit from 2009 resurfaced. The video, titled "Daryl", was intended to be a parody of Dexter and featured Harmon acting out raping a baby (which, in the video, was a doll). Harmon apologized for the video and said, "In 2009, I made a 'pilot' which strove to parody the series Dexter and only succeeded in offending. I quickly realized the content was way too distasteful and took the video down immediately. Nobody should ever have to see what you saw and for that, I sincerely apologize." Adult Swim released a statement criticizing the video, but appeared to be satisfied with Harmon's apology. Multiple sources associated Harmon's decision to delete his Twitter account with the backlash. However, on an episode of Harmontown in February 2019, he revealed that he had deleted his Twitter account prior to the backlash in response to Disney's firing of James Gunn for jokes that Gunn had made on Twitter between 2008 and 2012.

== Filmography ==
=== Film ===
| Year | Title | Role | Notes |
|---|---|---|---|
| 2006 | Monster House | —N/a | Writer |
| 2008 | Kung Fu Panda | —N/a | Uncredited writer |
| 2014 | Harmontown | Himself | Documentary; also executive producer |
| 2015 | Knight of Cups | Dan | Uncredited |
| 2015 | Back in Time | Himself | Documentary |
| 2016 | Doctor Strange | —N/a | Uncredited consultant |
| 2018 | Seven Stages to Achieve Eternal Bliss | Cartwright | |
| TBA | Community: The Movie | —N/a | Writer |

=== Television ===
| Year | Title | Role | Notes |
|---|---|---|---|
| 1999 | Heat Vision and Jack | —N/a | Pilot; creator and writer |
| 2003 | Computerman | Eugene Murzowski | Also creator, writer and executive producer |
| 2006 | Tenacious D: Time Fixers | Heckler | Promotional short film; writer |
| 2006 | MTV Video Music Awards 2006 | —N/a | Television special; writer |
| 2007 | Acceptable.TV | Various roles | Also co-creator, writer and executive producer |
| 2007–2010 | The Sarah Silverman Program | —N/a | Co-creator and writer |
| 2008 | Googas | Dan | Also co-creator, writer |
| 2008 | Spike Video Game Awards 2008 | —N/a | Television special; writer |
| 2009 | The 81st Annual Academy Awards | —N/a | Television special; writer |
| 2009–2015 | Community | —N/a | Creator; Writer and executive producer (season 1–3; 5–6); Executive consultant (season 4) |
| 2012 | Mary Shelley's Frankenhole | Dr. Jekyl (voice) | 5 episodes |
| 2013–present | Rick and Morty | Birdperson / additional voices | Also co-creator, writer and executive producer |
| 2013 | Arrested Development | Yurt Clerk | Episode: "Borderline Personalities" |
| 2013 | Axe Cop | Audience Member (voice) | Episode: "Babysitting Uni-Baby" |
| 2015 | Drunk History | Narrator | Episode: "Miami" |
| 2015 | The Simpsons | —N/a | Episode: "Mathlete's Feat"; wrote couch gag |
| 2016 | Great Minds with Dan Harmon | Himself | Also writer and executive producer |
| 2016–2019 | HarmonQuest | Himself / Fondue Zoobag / Limerick O'Shift | Also creator, writer and executive producer |
| 2017 | Dr. Ken | Himself | Episode: "Ken's Big Audition" |
| 2017 | Mystery Science Theater 3000: The Return | —N/a | Writer |
| 2017 | Animals. | Ad Man 1 | Episode: "Humans." |
| 2017 | The Simpsons | Himself (voice) | Episode: "Springfield Splendor" |
| 2017 | Good Game | Suit | Also executive producer |
| 2022 | Little Demon | —N/a | Executive producer |
| 2023 | Strange Planet | —N/a | Co-creator and executive producer |
| 2023–present | Krapopolis | —N/a | Creator and executive producer |
| 2025–present | Haunted Hotel | —N/a | Executive producer |
| 2026–present | President Curtis | —N/a | Co-creator and executive producer |

=== Web series ===
| Year | Title | Role | Notes |
|---|---|---|---|
| 2017 | Guest Grumps | Himself (director) | Episode: "The Cat in the Hat with Special Guest Dan Harmon" |

== Bibliography ==
=== Story credits ===
- Scud: The Disposable Assassin #4–5, 8–9, 13–15 & 17–19 (co-writer and illustrator Rob Schrab, co-writer Mondy Carter, colorist Zac Rybacki, Fireman Press, 1994)
- La Cosa Nostroid #1–9 (illustrator Edward Clayton, Fireman Press, 1996)
- Monster House (illustrator and co-writer Simeon Wilkins, IDW Publishing, 2006)
