= Steve Agee =

American comedian, writer, actor and musician

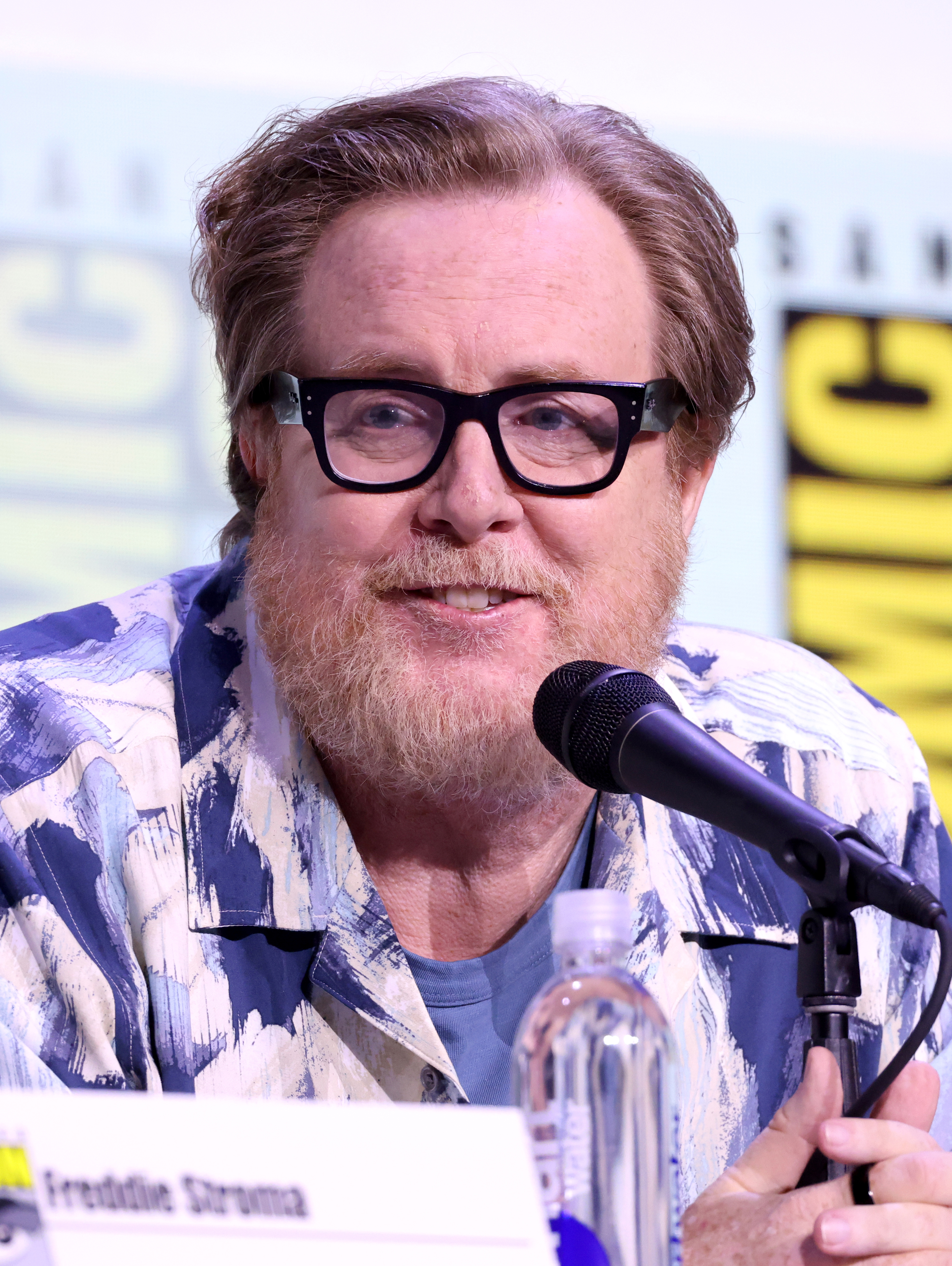
- Agee at San Diego Comic-Con in 2025
- Born: Steven Douglas Agee; February 26, 1969 (age 57); Riverside, California, U.S.
- Occupations: Comedian; actor; writer
- Years active: 2000–present

Steven Douglas Agee (/ˈeɪˌdʒiː/; born February 26, 1969) is an American comedian, actor, writer and musician, known for roles including Steve Myron on the Comedy Central series The Sarah Silverman Program and as John Economos in the DCEU superhero films The Suicide Squad (2021) and Shazam! Fury of the Gods (2023), as well the HBO Max DCEU/DCU series Peacemaker (2022–2025) and Creature Commandos (2024–present). His portrayal of John Economos was described by critics as a standout supporting role.

As a television writer, Agee contributed to more than 300 episodes of Jimmy Kimmel Live! between 2005 and 2008.

== Career ==
Agee is also a musician. He played guitar and bass in various rock bands in the 1990s, such as Three Different Sizes and Glad you Hurt your Hand, and has collaborated with Brendon Small in the past. He played bass guitar in a commercial for Rocksmith 2014 and released a comedy-punk album, Scab, on September 4, 2021.

Agee has also been active in the comedy podcast scene, appearing regularly on shows such as Comedy Bang! Bang! and Doug Loves Movies, where he performed both as himself and in character.

== Filmography ==
=== Film ===
Year	Title	Role	Notes
2000	The Bogus Witch Project	—N/a	"The Griffith Witch Project" segment; also director and producer
2003	Kicked in the Nuts	Man on the Street	Short film
2005	Sarah Silverman: Jesus Is Magic	Guy in Wings	
2006	Sleeping Dogs Lie	Carl	
2010	Super	Comic Book Store Jerk	
2011	God Bless America	American Superstarz Crew Member	
2011	Angry White Man	Floyd	
2012	Hit and Run	Dude #1	
2013	The Insomniac	Gun Dealer	
2013	Dealin' with Idiots	Hezekiah	
2014	Leonard in Slow Motion	Redhead	Short film
2014	Abby in the Summer	Rick the Repairman	
2014	Dark Was the Night	The Foreman	
2014	Me	Steve	
2015	The Hive	Kevin	
2015	Amigo Undead	Norm Ostrowski	
2015	Dementia	Larry	
2016	Maid of Heaven	Jack	Short Music Film
2017	Guardians of the Galaxy Vol. 2	Gef	
2019	Brightburn	EJ	
2019	Aliens, Clowns & Geeks	Jumbo	
2021	Violet	Boris	
2021	The Suicide Squad	John Economos	Also the on set stand-in for King Shark
2023	Shazam! Fury of the Gods	John Economos	Mid-credit scene
2025	The Napa Boys	Ethan Nerdone	
TBA	Thud †		Post-production

=== Television ===
Year	Title	Role	Notes
2007–10	The Sarah Silverman Program	Steven Ned Myron III	32 episodes
2010	Accidentally on Purpose	Ian	Episode: "Speed"
2010–13	Childrens Hospital	Lollipop Salesman / Terry	2 episodes
2011–22	Bob's Burgers	Various characters (voices)	2 episodes
2011–16	Adventure Time	Various characters (voices)	9 episodes
2011	Death Valley	Porn Director	Episode: "Two Girls, One Cop"
2012	Happy Endings	Chad	Episode: "Makin' Changes!"
2012–16	2 Broke Girls	Tig / Nurse	2 episodes
2012	The League	Piano Store Guy	Episode: "The Vapora Sport"
2013–17	New Girl	Outside Dave	Recurring role, 13 episodes
2013	The Cleveland Show	—N/a (voice)	Episode: "The Hangover: Part Tubbs"
2013–16	@midnight	Himself	17 episodes
2013	You're Whole	Lonny Dibbs	Episode: "Lemonade/Fishing/Cupcakes"
2014–25	Rick and Morty	Giant, Restaurant Owner (voice)	2 episodes
2014–15	Community	David / Deejay	2 episodes
2014	Garfunkel and Oates	Toy Store Cashier	Episode: "The Fadeaway"
2014–17	You're the Worst	Dutch	6 episodes
2015	A to Z	Lewis	Episode: "L Is for Likability"
2015	Maron	Himself	Episode: "Steel Johnson"
2015	Comedy Bang! Bang!	Donald	Episode: "Mary Elizabeth Winstead Wears an A-Line Skirt and Pointy Black Boots"
2015–16	Regular Show	Corny, Cowboy, Zaxon (voices)	2 episodes
2016	Modern Family	Tommy	Episode: "Thunk in the Trunk"
2016	American Dad!	(voice)	Episode: "The Devil Wears a Lapel Pin"
2016	Mr. Neighbor's House	Demon #2	TV special
2016–21	Superstore	Isaac	12 episodes
2017	American Housewife	Don	2 episodes
2017	Crashing	Himself	Episode: "Warm-Up"
2017	Speechless	Lunch Man	Episode: "T-R-- TRAINING D-A-- DAY"
2018	Talking Dead	Himself	Episode: "Dead or Alive Or"
2018	Drunk History	Harry Reeder	Episode: "World War II"
2020	Close Enough	Davey Wegman (voice)	Episode: "Logan's Run'd"
2022–25	Peacemaker	John Economos	Main cast
2022	Guillermo del Toro's Cabinet of Curiosities	Guy Landon	Episode: "The Viewing"
2023	Home Economics	Declan	Episode: "Limited Edition Boom Boom Dojo JollyBot, $45.99"
2023–25	Krapopolis	Heracles (voice)	2 episodes
2023	Never Have I Ever	Skeeter	Episode: "...gotten sweet revenge"
2024–present	Creature Commandos	John Economos	Voice role
2025	Loot	Alan R.	Episode: "Billionaire, Beautiful and True"
2025	Abbott Elementary	Edward	Episode: "Birthday"

=== Web ===
Year	Title	Role	Notes
2005	Yacht Rock	Steve Porcaro, Papa Moroder	
2005	House of Cosbys	Housekeeping Cosby (voice)	1 episode
2008	Held Up	Homeless man	Unknown episodes
2014	American Viral	Dr. Giggles	Episode: "Paging Dr. Giggles"
2014	Manly	Ahriman (voice)	
2016	HarmonQuest	Tec Powers (voice)	Episode: "Welcome to Freshport"
2016	Pitch Off	Himself	Episode: "Pitch Speed 3 to Doug Benson"
2019	Twelve Forever	Big Deal, Mack, Beefhouse, Galaxander (voices)	

=== Video games ===
Year	Title	Voice role	Notes
2009	Brütal Legend	Skull Raker	
2015	Lego Dimensions	Ancient Psychic Tandem War Elephant	

=== Writing credits ===
- 2005–08: Jimmy Kimmel Live! (337 episodes)
- The Andy Milonakis Show
