= Rob Schrab =

Comic book creator, screenwriter, producer, and director (born 1969)

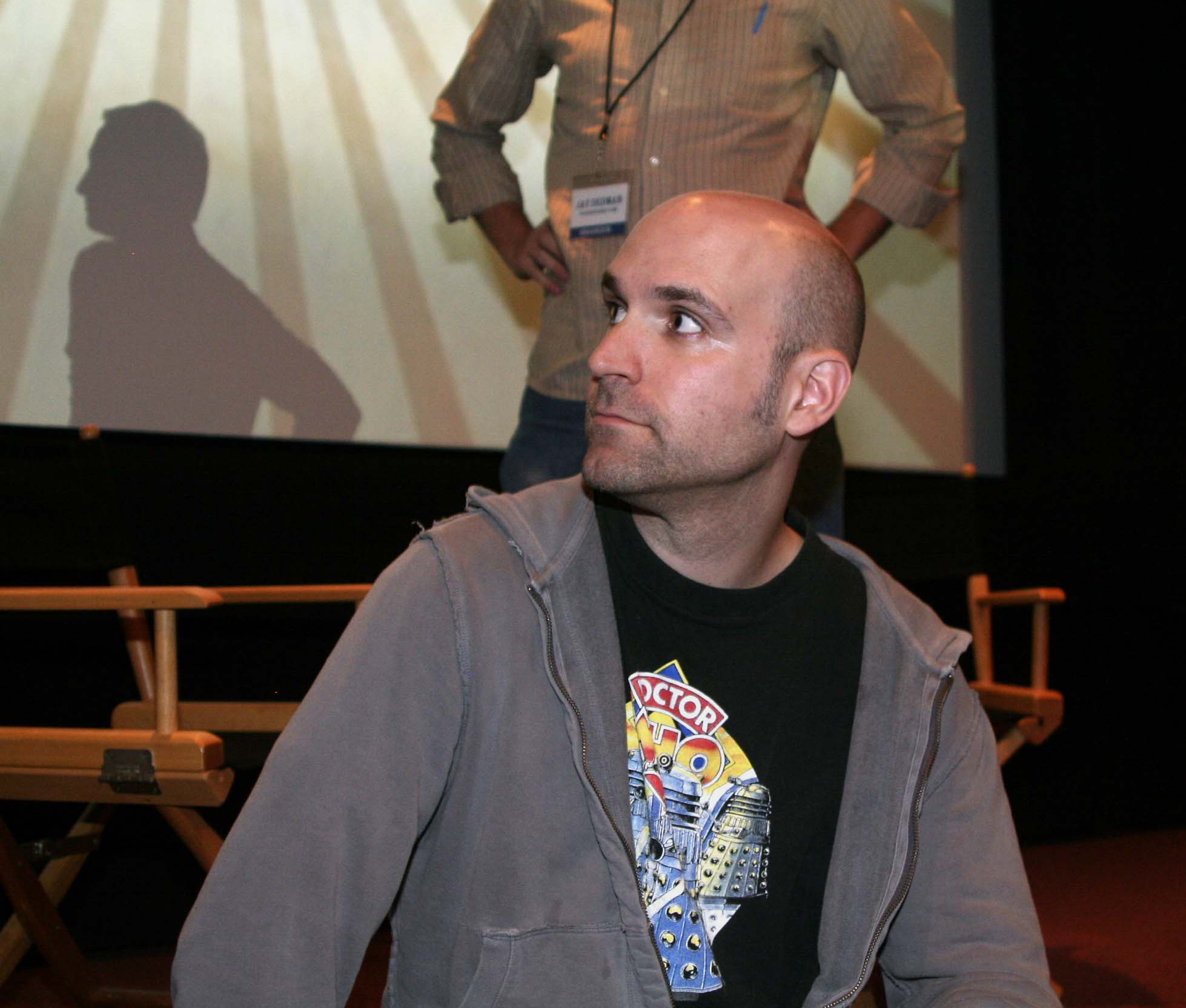
- Born: Robby Christopher Schrab; November 12, 1969 (age 56); Mayville, Wisconsin, U.S.
- Occupations: Comic book creator; screenwriter; producer; director
- Years active: 1997–present
- Notable work: Scud: The Disposable Assassin; Monster House; The Sarah Silverman Program; Channel 101

Robby Christopher Schrab (born November 12, 1969) is an American comic book creator, writer, director, and producer. He is the creator of the comic book Scud: The Disposable Assassin, co-writer of the feature film Monster House, co-creator of the competitive film festival Channel 101, and the co-creator of the television series The Sarah Silverman Program.

== Education and early career ==
Schrab is a graduate of the Milwaukee Institute of Art and Design. In the 1990s, he wrote and illustrated the critically acclaimed independent comics series Scud: The Disposable Assassin.

== Film and television ==
In 1997, Oliver Stone's company Illusion Entertainment bought the film rights to Scud: The Disposable Assassin. In the hopes of getting a chance to write the script, Schrab and his writing partner Dan Harmon moved to Los Angeles. Despite being turned down the pair decided to try their luck in the entertainment business. They wrote a spec script called Big Ant Movie or BAM. This script found its way to director/producer Robert Zemeckis who signed them to a two-film deal. One of the ideas they pitched was called Monster House. They subsequently wrote a script and the film was eventually released in 2006 after being rewritten in the meantime.

With their reputation growing, Schrab and Harmon were in talks with numerous producers and companies. They signed a blind deal with ABC which they then wanted to get out of. They decided to scare the network by "writ[ing] our favorite TV show ever." ABC was not impressed but the script made its way to Ben Stiller who decided to produce a pilot. Heat Vision and Jack (1999) starred Jack Black and, as the voice of a motorcycle, Owen Wilson. The pilot was not picked up but it eventually gained a reputation as a cult classic.

In 2002, Schrab wrote and directed Robot Bastard!, a 17-minute science fiction action comedy film.

Together with Sarah Silverman, Schrab and Harmon created The Sarah Silverman Program on Comedy Central. Harmon was eventually fired from the show, but Schrab stayed on for all three seasons. He also played the cross-dressing host of Cookie Party, Miniature "Mini" Coffee.

Harmon and Schrab later renewed their partnership with the latter working on both Community, the show Harmon created after leaving The Sarah Silverman Program, and Rick and Morty, the show Harmon created after being fired from Community.

Schrab was slated to direct The Lego Movie 2: The Second Part as his first feature, but left the project in February 2017. He co-directed Mystery Science Theater 3000's season 12 along with Joel Hodgson, wrote and directed episodes of the Creepshow reboot for Shudder, and worked with Harmon as a writer on Rick and Morty for Adult Swim.

== Other ==
Schrab is also a regular guest on the podcast Fear Initiative and appeared regularly on the podcast Harmontown before it ended in late 2019.

Schrab has won two Primetime Emmy Awards: one in 2009 for co-writing Hugh Jackman's Opening Number for the 81st Annual Academy Awards, and one in 2020 as a producer on Rick and Morty.
