= Shrek fandom =

Fandom of the Shrek franchise

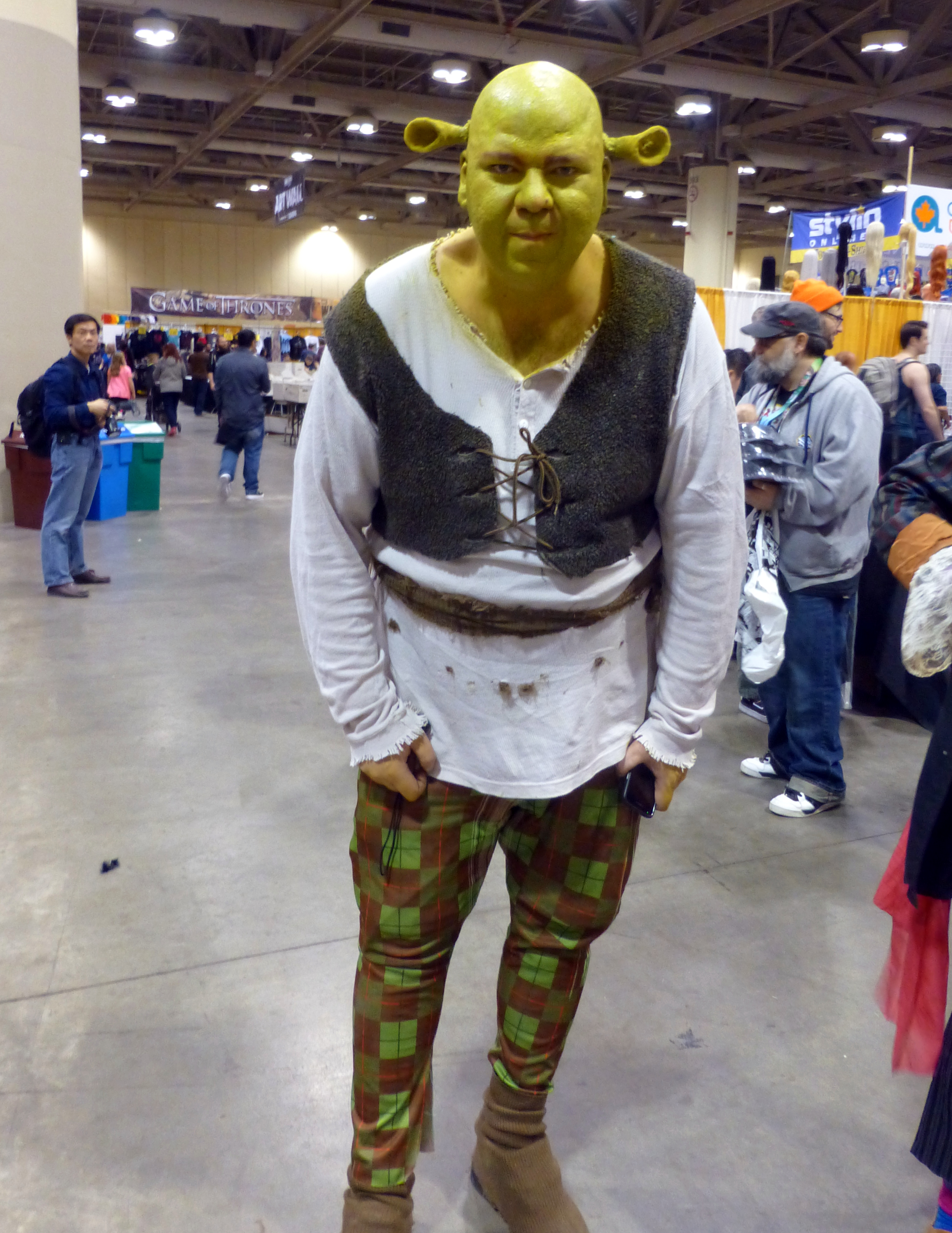
A fan cosplaying Shrek, 2015

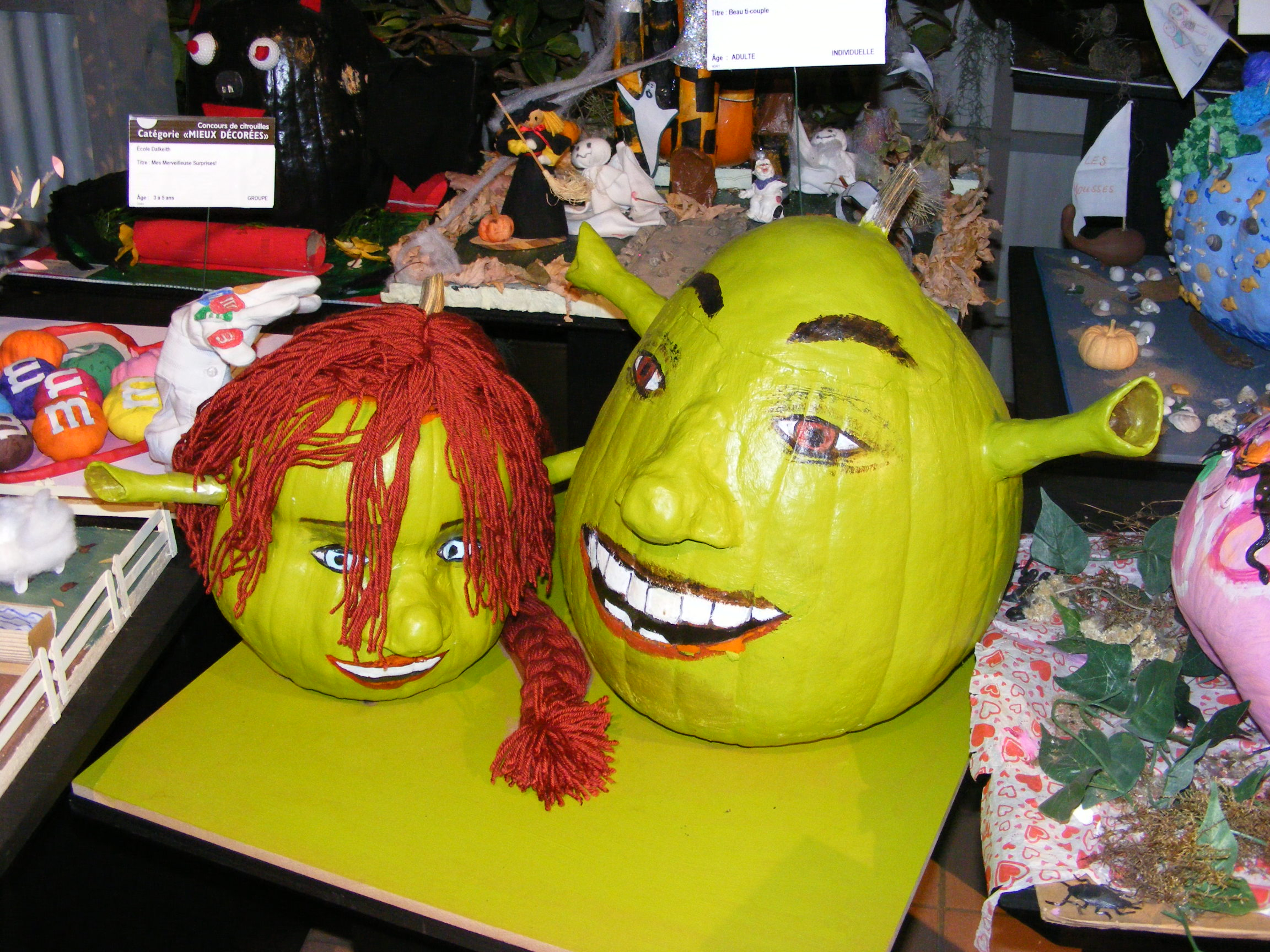
Shrek pumpkins made on Halloween, 2008

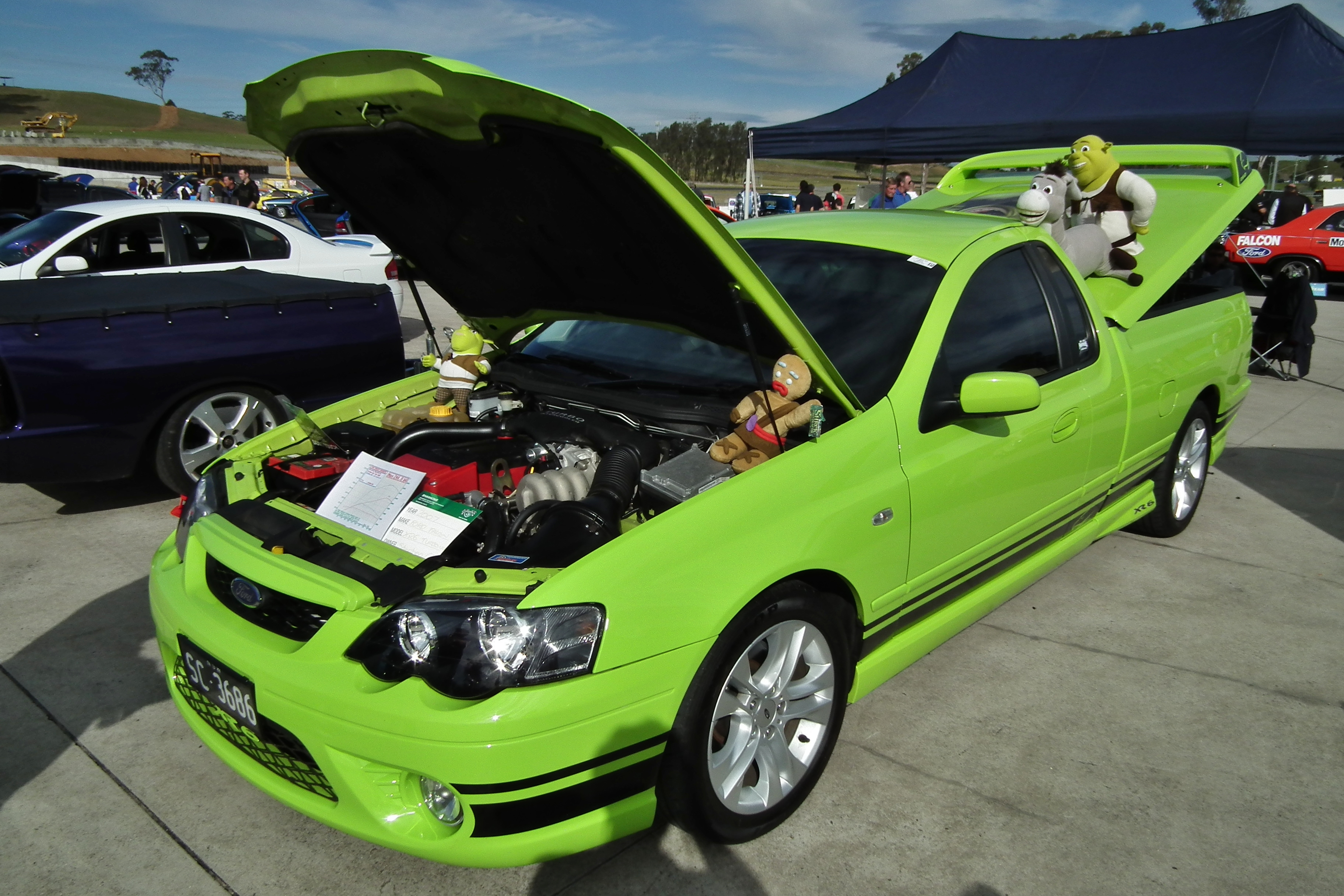
A green 2007 Ford Falcon decorated with Shrek plushies at an auto show, 2011

DreamWorks Animation's Shrek franchise, based on William Steig's book of the same name, has an underground Internet fandom that started around 2009.

With the fanbase described by some people as an ironic liking towards the series, there have been several sexually explicit memes based on the title character. An example is a 2013 metameme centered on a video called "Shrek Is Love, Shrek Is Life", which is based on a post originating on 4chan's /b/ board.

Fans of Shrek are known as "Brogres", a take on the name "Bronies", the teen and adult fans of the show My Little Pony: Friendship is Magic.

According to New York, Shrek is "one of the patron saints of the elaborate and complex culture of Dank Memedom."

== History ==
=== 2001–2012: Background and early history ===
The 2001 film Shrek, based on William Steig's picture book of the same name, garnered acclaim from critics and won an Oscar, while Shrek 2 (2004) was, at the time, the highest-grossing animated film ever at the North American box office. However, Dave Sims of The Atlantic's The Wire marked the second film as the start of the decline in quality and commercial success of the franchise, writing that none of the sequels were remembered due to the jokes' relying on "cheap topical gags and flimsy celebrity cameos." He noted that "the joke of Shrek's mediocrity was then filtered through the Internet's many weird joke filters, which end up in a weird mix of sincerity and surrealism." While fans had been creating and posting their own comics and pictures of Shrek depicted outside of the films on DeviantArt ever since Shrek's 2001 release, "it took about 11 years for the Internet's Shrek obsession to go from cute to cult-like" as The Daily Dot wrote.

Shrek's official Facebook page was launched by DreamWorks on December 1, 2009, and was used to promote the products and spin-offs of the franchise, with the title character "speaking" to his fans through posts. These posts were very popular, garnering 1,000 to 2,000 more views than the typical promotional post at the time.

In 2010, the year of the release of Shrek Forever After, a comic on DeviantArt titled "Shadow begs Shrek” was posted by user "cmara", and paired Shrek with Shadow the Hedgehog, a character from the Sonic the Hedgehog series. A Kotaku writer stated that a possible reason for the pairing was that both characters "tried to act like they were too cool for 'kid stuff.' Too sophisticated, too edgy. They were made for each other—and approximately one billion people between the ages of 12 and 34." It went viral, and what followed was several memes, including what The Week journalist Scott Meslow described as "awful puns, half-assed Photoshops, bizarre fan fiction," most of them sexually explicit, and a horror game revolving around Shrek stalking the player through a swamp. There have been lists compiling online Shrek fan art, including a January 2014 list by Chloe Cole of the CollegeHumor site Dorkly of "The Most Upsetting Shrek and Shadow Fan Art On the Internet", and official Smosh website writer Daniel Dominguez's list of "20 Uncomfortably Sexual Pieces Of Shrek Fan Art", published in November 2013.

=== 2012–present: ShrekChan, Shrek Is Love, Shrek Is Life ===
May 2012 marked the launch of ShrekChan, a 4chan-esque imageboard for fans of Shrek to comment on anything related to the Shrek series. Fans of Shrek are nicknamed "brogres", which is a take on the name of the young adult fans of My Little Pony: Friendship Is Magic known as bronies. The board had garnered 500,000 visitors as of March 22, 2014. In 2013, Shrek's online popularity went to what The Daily Dot described as a "whole new demented level", with a fanmade video called Shrek Is Love, Shrek Is Life, an adaptation of a story posted on 4chan describing a sexual encounter between a nine-year-old boy and Shrek after the boy's father reprimands him for his Shrek obsession. A metameme based on this was posted on 4chan's paranormal board on January 31, 2013, which led to many "deranged illustrations" posted online influenced by the post. Many duplications of the video were also uploaded, with the video and its replicas garnering over 90 million views as of May 2016.

On March 25, 2014, the video was a "Cartoon Brew pick", and the award was number 13 on their "Top 20 Stories of 2014" published on the site. The video was also put by Gizmodo writer Ashley Feinberg's list of the "11 of the Weirdest Videos on YouTube".

In 2014, ShrekChan was shut down with a message from the board's founder:

The Shrek meme is dead, and it's time to stop trying to keep this going. It is inevitable and it has to happen at some point in time. Many of you who truly love the Shrek movies may think that shutting down ShrekChan is a bad idea, but I hope that you may find another website to discuss the love for Shrek.

A "Shrek Filmmaker" movement in which Source Filmmaker animators made videos based on the Internet's obsession with Shrek was described by a PC Magazine journalist as "One of the craziest and funniest underground Source Filmmaker movements". The videos involve the character placed in "glitchy worlds of horrifying imagery and Smash Mouth references." These videos have included parodies such as "Shrek It Ralph" and "Shreking Ball", as well as a crossover with R. L. Stine's Goosebumps series, "Shrek Gets Spooked", which had close to two million views by October 2015.

In November 2018, comedy group 3GI, organizer of Shrekfest, a Shrek-themed festival in Milwaukee that started in 2014, released a reanimated collab of the film Shrek, made by a crew of over 200 artists, titled Shrek Retold. A sequel to this remake, of the film Shrek 2, made by a crew of artists titled Shrek 2 Retold, was released one year later with its announcement trailer shown at Shrekfest 2019. Shrek 2 Retold premiered at the Oriental Theatre during Shrekfest 2023. A trailer was released on May 19, 2024, announcing the film will be released on September 28 of that year, as well as announcing a number of contributors, including Justin Long, Zach Hadel, Justin and Travis McElroy, Joe Pera, Jaiden Animations, jacksfilms, Tom Fulp, James Rolfe, LAKE, Jerma985, Bill Wurtz, Phil Lord, Christopher Miller, and the late Gilbert Gottfried and Will Cullen Hart. On September 20, 2024, the film was delayed indefinitely. On January 29, 2026, it was announced that the film was still in progress.

"Shrexting" (a portmanteau of the words "Shrek" and "sexting") is the act of sending messages containing sexually explicit images of Shrek. In 2026, a reporter was arrested after Shrexting an image to Ohio senator Jerry Cirino.

== Analysis and reception ==
Purposefully poor-quality fan art and animation of Shrek and loyalty towards the song "All Star" by pop rock group Smash Mouth, which played in the first film of the series, are also traits of the Internet's obsession towards Shrek. Sims wrote that one possible reason of Shrek's Internet fanbase was that the franchise was a depiction of "everything that was initially exciting and then quickly patronizing" about the early 2000s, saying that "It's symbolic of so many things we briefly loved before quickly realizing their emptiness." He also said that with many other memes, Occam's razor is a factor: "Shrek has a funny, stupid face, and putting that face in a weird place provokes a cheap laugh." The online appreciation of Shrek has also been described as ironic. Know Your Meme's former researcher Amanda Brennan described it as a "subversion of brony culture, again taking something relatively childish with good intentions and flipping it to an ironic appreciation." Sims shared a similar sentiment by noting that, like other memes, it was "one giant agreed-upon joke. No one ever admits that the Shrek series is a cinematic masterpiece, even though DreamWorks drove it into the ground as hard as it possibly could."

Alan Hanson, a contributor for The Awl who made fun of ShrekChan and similar fansites, found the darker side of the Internet's obsession towards Shrek:

A lot of Shrek content is him making awful faces, being very leery. Children's movies and fairytales are already inherently very dark, and Shrek on its own tries to show the even darker side of that, so it's almost the natural progression to get into the real "swamp" of Shrek, the "Drek" as they say. If Shrek is love, Drek is everything that's not Shrek/love.

He described a fan's apartment as a "swamp", which "is lovely because it's your place, made of the things that comfort you, even if they're gross and unliked by others." He said that a person who is against loving Shrek can be called a "Farquaad. Then it gets pretty derogatory past that, lot's [sic] of f-words and n-words unfortunately."

== See also ==
- Ogres in modern fiction
