= Hellbender (disambiguation) =

The hellbender (Cryptobranchus alleganiensis) is a species of giant salamander that is native to eastern North America.

Hellbender or Hellbenders may also refer to:

- Hellbender (video game), a 1996 futuristic flight simulator
- Hellbenders (film), a 2012 American comedy horror film
- Hellbender (film), a 2021 horror film
- Hellbender, an outdoor music venue located in Asheville, North Carolina
- Hellbenders, a 2012 animated web-series created by Zach Hadel and Chris O'Neill
- The Hellbenders (I crudeli, 1967), a spaghetti western directed by Sergio Corbucci
