= A Allan Adventure =

- Smiling Friends episode
- Allan (middle) rides a rowboat in an attempt to catch up with the skeleton pirates' ship.
- Episode no.: Season 2 Episode 3
- Directed by: Paul ter Voorde (director, storyboard): Michael Dockery (storyboard); Jake Ganz (storyboard); Paul Georghiou (storyboard); Sheldon Vella (storyboard)
- Written by: Zach Hadel; Michael Cusack
- Original air date: May 20, 2024
- Running time: 12 minutes

Episode chronology
← Previous "Mr. President"	Next → "Erm, the Boss Finds Love?"
- Smiling Friends season 2

"A Allan Adventure" is the third episode of the second season of the American adult animated television series Smiling Friends. It was written by series creators Zach Hadel and Michael Cusack, and was directed by Paul ter Voorde. It was storyboarded by Michael Dockery, Jake Ganz, Paul Georghiou, Voorde, and Sheldon Vella. The episode originally aired on May 20, 2024, on Adult Swim to an audience of 180,000 viewers.

The series revolves around the Smiling Friends, a small charity dedicated to spreading happiness. The episode follows employee Allan, who is tasked with buying more paperclips by his boss, Mr. Boss. However, due to a series of mishaps, he is repeatedly unable to obtain the paperclips.

The episode received positive reviews from critics following its release, with praise going towards its absurd humor and focus on Allan. It has been featured on lists of the series' best episodes.

== Plot ==
After completing his morning routine, Allan is greeted by his landlord, who invites him to hang out and partake in marijuana, diet soda, and Burnout Revenge for the PS2, which Allan declines. He heads to work, where his employer, Mr. Boss, assigns him the task of purchasing more paperclips for the office, promising a reward upon completion. At the office supply store OfficeCrap, Allan is yelled at by an irritated employee for asking where the paperclips are and informed by the store's manager they are sold out. He then visits a small electronics shop, where the owner gives him a box of paperclips for helping him configure some electronics. Upon leaving the shop, DJ Spit snatches the paperclips from Allan's hands. Allan chases him, pursuing the thief to a rooftop, where DJ Spit hijacks a helicopter. Allan manages to grab onto the underside as it takes off. DJ Spit tells Allan he plans to take him to Tijuana, but the U.S. Air Force arrives and a dogfight ensues, with the fighter jets shooting down the helicopter carrying Allan and the thief.

After crash-landing on an island, Allan discovers the paperclips buried in the sand, only for a Sasquatch to appear and steal them, hiding them inside a cave. When the Sasquatch leaves to urinate, Allan sneaks inside and retrieves the paperclips, but accidentally drops them onto a pile of bones. The bones reanimate into a skeleton pirate, who steals the paperclips and boards a ship crewed by other skeleton pirates. Allan follows in a rowboat, but both he and the pirate crew are swallowed by a giant sea monster. The creature later spits Allan and the paperclips out onto the shore. When Allan opens the paperclip box, he finds a letter with directions to the real paperclips, which takes him to his own apartment complex. Returning home, he confronts his landlord, who reveals he orchestrated all of Allan's misadventures so they could hang out and play Burnout Revenge together. Allan initially refuses but relents when the landlord threatens to bomb the city if he declines again. Allan manages to use a paperclip to disarm the bomb, prompting the landlord to commit seppuku. Back at work, Allan presents the paperclips to Mr. Boss, who rewards him with a miniature version of himself. Allan declines the gift, and his coworker Charlie happily takes it instead. In a post-credits scene, the landlord awakens in a morgue, vowing that Allan will hang out with him again.

== Production ==
A storyboard of the episode, as released by director Paul ter Voorde.

Throughout the episode, Allan's landlord repeatedly asks him to play the PlayStation 2 game Burnout Revenge with him. Series creators Zach Hadel and Michael Cusack revealed at the 2024 San Diego Comic Con convention that the game Shadow of the Colossus was originally intended to appear instead, but Cusack suggested using Burnout Revenge because the former did not support multiplayer gameplay, making the narrative more "engaging". Cusack noted that one of the Burnout games was the first title he ever played on the PS2 with a friend. Following the episode's release, director Paul ter Voorde tweeted about its development, stating that for the scene set at the OfficeCrap building, several animators were assigned to it to complete the "lengthy" scene as quickly as possible.

== Release and reception ==
A preview of the episode was released onto Adult Swim's YouTube channel prior to its release. In the United States, the episode was watched by 180 thousand viewers during its original broadcast on May 20, 2024. It received a 0.09% share among adults between the ages of 18 and 49, meaning that it was seen by 0.09% of all households in that demographic.

In her review of season two, Lex Briscuso of TheWrap highlighted "A Allan Adventure", positively noting it as an example of the season branching out and expanding the series' characters. Collider writer S.K. Sapiano ranked the episode as the eighth best of the entire series, writing highly of its ability to make such an absurd plot feel coherent and for adding onto Allan's character. Paste's Dianna Shen listed it as her third favorite episode, calling it an expansion on the show's "trademark nonsense", and writing that the episode made her want a version of each episode told from Allan's perspective.
