= Smiling Friends =

Australian-American adult animated sitcom

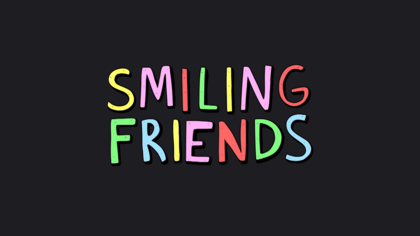
- Genre: Animated sitcom; Black comedy; Surreal comedy
- Created by: Zach Hadel; Michael Cusack
- Written by: Michael Cusack; Zach Hadel
- Directed by: Michael Cusack; Zach Hadel; David Hootselle (Note: Episode director) (season 3)
- Voices of: Michael Cusack; Zach Hadel; Marc M.
- Theme music composer: Brendan Caulfield
- Ending theme: "Brown Smile" by Chris O'Neill
- Composer: Brendan Caulfield
- Countries of origin: Australia; United States
- Original language: English
- No. of seasons: 3
- No. of episodes: 27 + 3 shorts

Production
- Executive producers: Michael Cusack; Zach Hadel; Mike Cowap (seasons 1-2); Emma Fitzsimons (seasons 1-2); Brendan Burch (pilot); Keith Crofford (Note: Credited as Executive Producer for Williams Street.) (pilot); Walter Newman (pilot; season 1); Ollie Green (season 1); Kelly Crews (seasons 2–3); Cameron Tang (seasons 2–3)
- Producers: Scott Malchus (season 3); Ollie Green (Note: Credited as Producer for Williams Street.) (pilot); Laura DiMaio (Note: Promoted to Supervising Producer for season 2.) (seasons 1-2); Paul Moran (season 2); Casey Rup (season 2); Cody DeMatteis (season 2)
- Editors: Scott Henry (season 1); Lukas Xuereb (season 1); Aron Fromm (seasons 2-3); Tom Browngardt (Note: Assistant editor.) (season 3); Bobby Gibis (season 3) (Note: Picture editor for "Friend-Bot (Version 12589218731809213528796879521)" and "Charlie's Uncle Dies and Doesn't Come Back".)
- Running time: 11 minutes
- Production companies: 6 Point Harness (pilot); Williams Street; Goblin Caught on Tape

Original release
- Network: Adult Swim
- Release: April 1, 2020 (pilot)
- Release: January 10, 2022 – April 12, 2026

Smiling Friends is an adult animated sitcom created by Zach Hadel and Michael Cusack for Cartoon Network's nighttime programming block Adult Swim. The show revolves around the surreal misadventures of a small charity and its four employees dedicated to spreading happiness. It utilizes a wide variety of different art styles and animation techniques, including stylized traditional animation, computer animation, rotoscoping, stop motion, Flash animation, and live-action.

The pilot episode aired April 1, 2020, unannounced as part of Adult Swim's annual April Fools' Day event alongside the premiere of Cusack's other series, YOLO. On May 19, 2021, Adult Swim ordered a full season that was initially set to premiere in late 2021. A panel dedicated to the series was held during the Adult Swim Festival on November 12, 2021, where co-creator Zach Hadel mentioned the show would premiere "within a few months", pushing the release schedule ahead to 2022. The first season contains nine episodes, including the pilot and an 11-minute special. The first season eventually premiered on January 10, 2022, with Adult Swim airing all episodes of the season, except for the special, in one night despite initial plans for a weekly release. (Note: Adult Swim lists the series premiere as airing on January 9 at 12:00 a.m. (24:00) EST/PST, which is effectively January 10.)

Smiling Friends received positive reviews from critics. It was renewed for a second season on February 9, 2022. The season premiere aired on April 1, 2024, with the rest of the season beginning to air on May 13. On June 13, 2024, Adult Swim renewed the series for a third season. The third season was previewed at Annecy on June 11, 2025. On the same day, it was announced the series was renewed for an additional fourth and fifth season. The third season premiered on October 5, 2025.

Despite being renewed for two more seasons, in February 2026, Hadel and Cusack announced in a video that the series would end after its third season. They attributed the series' abrupt conclusion to burnout, a shared belief that the show had run its natural course, and expressed concern that if they continued creating episodes that there would be a drop in quality. Despite this, they did not entirely rule out the possibility of the series returning for a special or another season in the future. The final two episodes of the third season were released on April 12, 2026.

== Premise ==
From left to right: Allan, Pim, Charlie, and Glep

The series follows the misadventures and shenanigans of four employees and their boss at Smiling Friends Inc., a nonprofit charity based in Philadelphia, Pennsylvania, dedicated to making their clients smile. The majority of the show focuses on two employees, Charlie Dompler and Pim Pimling; Pim is overtly cheerful, optimistic and eager to help people with their problems, whilst Charlie is more cynical and pragmatic. They are occasionally assisted by their coworkers, Allan Red and Glep, as well as their eccentric yet caring employer Mr. Boss. Chaos ensues, as the strange and often deeply troubled characters they are tasked with helping prove challenging and thrust them into bizarre situations.

== Voice cast ==
=== Main roles ===
- Michael Cusack as:
  - Pim Pimling: a short, pink character and one of the primary protagonists of the Smiling Friends. Pim is primarily known for his cheerful and optimistic personality as well as being the most willing to help others in need.
  - Allan Red: a tall and lanky red character who works as an office manager at the Smiling Friends. Allan is primarily known for his deadpan personality, monotone voice and sarcasm towards others. Nevertheless, Allan is also known for being extremely dedicated to his job and has been shown to go through extreme lengths to satisfy his boss.
  - Mr. Frog: a green frog-like demon who engages in extreme acts of unprovoked violence and destruction. Mr. Frog was a worldwide celebrity who began his career as the star of The Mr. Frog Show, but would later become the President of the United States, emperor of the world and the wealthiest man on the planet. He eventually finds inner peace which transforms him into a photo-realistic frog.
  - Cusack also provides many additional voices in each episode. Some include Professor Psychotic, a mad scientist who wishes to create life from an egg; Rex, the producer of The Mr. Frog Show; and James, a man obsessed with Charlie who tortures him. Cusack also voices most characters with Australian accents.
- Zach Hadel as:
  - Charlie Dompler: a large, yellow character and one of the primary protagonists of the Smiling Friends. Charlie is primarily known for his laid-back, avoidant and pessimistic attitude, especially when compared to his best friend Pim, but has a genuinely good heart, and is quick to challenge strangers (and even clients) that insult or threaten Pim.
  - Glep: a small, green character known for wearing a conical, purple hat and speaking in fast gibberish. He is typically seen relaxing in the company's break room. Born in 329, the third season's eighth episode reveals he was indirectly responsible for the collapse of the Roman Empire and the spread of the Black Death throughout Europe, as well as inspiring Mr. Boss to co-found Smiling Friends in 1992.
  - Hadel also provides many additional voices in each episode. Among the most prominent are Mip, a forest folk from the Enchanted Forest; DJ Spit, an unhinged amateur SoundCloud rapper and thief; Satan, the lord of Hell; Gwimbly, a 3D animated low-poly video game character; Mr. Landlord, a psychotic landlord at Allan's apartment; and Squim, a fluidly animated smiley face stylized like a Walt Disney Animation Studios and Don Bluth character.
- Marc M. as:
  - Mr. Boss: an elderly and eccentric man who is the owner of the Smiling Friends. Despite his bizarre and sometimes disturbing behavior, Mr. Boss genuinely cares for all of his employees.
  - Marc M. also provides additional voices. Among these are a man at the Brazil airport; a Goblin construction worker; and Bill Nye.

=== Supporting cast ===
- Joshua Tomar provides multiple one-off characters in every season of Smiling Friends. Some of his well-known roles include an elderly-aged Glep, the video game enemy Troglar, and a recurring lazy blue police sergeant, among other roles.
- David Dore as Party Bro (or "Rotoscope Guy") / Forest Demon / Armzo / Critter Doctor / Blue Critter / additional voices
- Erica Lindbeck as Rex's Assistant / Jennifer the Barista / Mustard / Princess of the Enchanted Forest / Brittney / Maurine / Marge Simpson (not to be confused with the Simpsons character of the same name) / Natasha / additional voices
  - Lindbeck also appears in live action as Vivianne the Nurse.
- Rodrigo Huerta as Meep Society Lady / Jombo / Secret Service Agents / Fireman / Pim's brother / additional voices
- Chris O'Neill as Smormu James Carter / Mr. Frog Auditionee / Yeti
- Hans van Harken as Jimmy Fallon / Priest / Hell Faces / Bill / Alien / Mint-Green Critter / additional voices
- Mick Lauer as Bug / Guy at the Gym / Crazy Cup / Elf / additional voices
- Harry Partridge as Smormu Announcer / Grease / 3D Squelton / William Worm
- David Firth as Shrimp / Fillmore / Mole Man / 1347 Peasant / Pink Man / Jimmy Durante
- Monica Franco as Zoey / Waitress / Wendy Worm
- Lyle Rath as Mr. Man / IGBG CEO / Renaissance men

=== Guest appearances (animated) ===
==== Introduced in season 1 ====
- Mike Stoklasa as Desmond / Purple Alien
  - Stoklasa also appears as himself in live-action for a split second frame
- Finn Wolfhard as Squatter / various Bliblies
- Nick Wolfhard as Graham Nelly / various Bliblies
- Tom Fulp as Alpha
- Chills as Patron
- Jason Paige as Dream Singer
- Gilbert Gottfried as God

==== Introduced in season 2 ====
- Joel Haver as Doug
- Marc Winslow as Pim's Spanish voice (Note: Winslow and Matus also voice their respective roles in the Latin American Spanish dub for the series.)
- Edson Matus as Charlie's Spanish voice
- Rich Evans as Brown Alien
- Jay Bauman as Police Alien
- TruVoice Peter Adult Male #1 as Oscar-Jester
- Dana Snyder as Rotten the Snowman

==== Introduced in season 3 ====
- Conner O'Malley as Silly Samuel
- Jim Norton as Mothman
- Todor Manojlovic as Mother Nature's minions
- Bill Butts as Mr. Ice Cream
- Dave Willis as Blart
- John DiMaggio as Uncle Bilbert

=== Guest appearances (live action) ===
- Jane Badler as Celebrity Show Host
- Jim Knobeloch as Mystery Show Host
- Clyde Boraine as Policeman
- Perry Caravello as Simon S. Salty
- James Rolfe as himself (split second frame)
- Mike Bocchetti as President Jimble
- Doug Walker as Daniel the Demon Slayer
- Abed Gheith as Tyler
- Jeff Schubert as Basement Guy
- Creed Bratton as Father Frog
- Bob McLean as Old Man
- Brian O'Halloran as himself
- Emme Dillard as Allan's Muse
- Qurban Ali as Bob (Friend-Bot unmasked)

== Episodes ==
Season 1 of the series was written and directed by series creators Michael Cusack and Zach Hadel. Starting with season 2, episodes were directed by different directors under an "episode director" role, while Cusack and Hadel retained their roles as "series director."

Episodes 5, 7 and 8 of season 2 do not credit any writer.

=== Series overview ===
| Season | Episodes | | Originally released | |
| Season | Episodes | | First released | Last released |
|---|---|---|---|---|
| 1 | 9 | TVP | April 1, 2020 | |
| 1 | 9 | 7 | January 10, 2022 | |
| 1 | 9 | TVS | August 6, 2022 | |
| 2 | 8 | | April 1, 2024 | June 24, 2024 |
| 3 | 10 | | October 5, 2025 | April 12, 2026 |

=== Season 1 (2020; 2022) ===
This is the only season without any episode director credit. However, there are different animation directors per episode.

| No. overall | No. in season | Title | Animation directed by | Storyboarded by | Original release date | US viewers (millions) |
|---|---|---|---|---|---|---|
| 1 | 1 | "Desmond's Big Day Out" | Jake Ganz | Zach Hadel & Michael Cusack | April 1, 2020 (April Fools Day); January 10, 2022 (series premiere) | 0.31 |
Pim and Charlie are called to help Desmond (Mike Stoklasa), a suicidal man who maintains a gun permanently pressed to his temple. The pair decide to cheer him up by showing him the joys of family and friendship. They first take Desmond to dinner with Pim's extended family; however, he is disheartened upon witnessing the family's dysfunctionality. The duo's subsequent attempt to showcase the benefits of friendship is similarly thwarted when Pim is publicly rebuffed by a stranger at a house party. Pim and Charlie then bring Desmond to an amusement park, which brings him temporary joy yet fails to fundamentally alter his nihilistic worldview. Meanwhile, Allan finds that the office has been infested by small creatures called "bliblies". Pim, Charlie, and Desmond return to an office entirely overrun with bliblies, and Allan is mounted to a crucifix. Desmond uses his gun to shoot a bliblie, which gives him a renewed sense of purpose and inspires him to start a pest control service. Note: This is the series's pilot episode. It aired as part of Adult Swim's annual April Fools' Day event and later aired with the rest of the episodes as part of the series premiere.
| 2 | 2 | "Mr. Frog" | Georgia Kriss | David Hootselle | January 10, 2022 | 0.31 |
The illustrious career of famed celebrity Mr. Frog is jeopardized after he attempts and fails to eat a TMZ reporter. Pim and Charlie are tasked with rehabilitating Frog. First, the two try to get him to quit drugs and have him donate money to the city, which goes awry when Frog accidentally slices off the hands of the city comptroller with the edge of a novelty check during the ceremony. They then put him on "sleeping pills" given to him by Charlie, only for a lucid Mr. Frog to say something extremely offensive on The Tonight Show Starring Jimmy Fallon, getting him completely blacklisted from the industry. Meanwhile, Glep is hired as Frog's replacement on The Mr. Frog Show, but the show's ratings-obsessed producer finds his ordinary behavior too "toxic" and forces him to tone himself down. The show's audience reacts with disgust to the reboot during its filming. Frog then appears in the studio to apologize and ends up eating the producer out of spite, regaining the public's love and becoming rich enough to host the show himself. Note: A puppet version of this episode aired on April Fools' Day 2024.
| 3 | 3 | "Shrimp's Odyssey" | Georgia Kriss | Jakub Zieba | January 10, 2022 | 0.30 |
Pim and Charlie are called to help Shrimp (David Firth), an awkward, reclusive gamer who was recently left by his girlfriend, Shrimpina. Charlie believes Shrimp should move on, while Pim aims to reunite the two and seeks her out to set her up on a blind date with Shrimp. However, Pim ends up developing feelings for Shrimpina and tries to steal the date for himself, but changes his mind once he sees Charlie with a miserable Shrimp at the agreed-upon meeting spot and reluctantly reintroduces the two. As it turns out, the woman Pim located was not Shrimpina, but a stranger named Jennifer. However, Jennifer finds herself attracted to Shrimp anyway, leaving Pim heartbroken. A preview before the episode asks the audience to vote on whether a new character, "Smormu", should be added to the show. He - who had been voted in by the audience - attempts to cheer Pim up as the episode ends. The "In Loving Memory" running gag of the series's credits shows that "Smormu James Carter" was later beaten to death. Note: A puppet version of this episode aired on April Fools' Day 2024.
| 4 | 4 | "A Silly Halloween Special" | Georgia Kriss | Michael Dockery & Jason Kruse | January 10, 2022 | 0.25 |
Before the episode, a Robert Stack–like host walking in an alleyway comments on the horrors of the unknown. Pim is tasked with retrieving firewood for the company's Halloween party, but gets lost after neglecting Mr. Boss's advice on its dangers. He suffers various delusions and is attacked by a demonic forest creature. It chases him back to the office, where the partygoers mistake its skin tone for blackface. Offended by his presence, Mr. Boss and the partygoers kill him, eat its flesh, and gratefully burn its remains as a substitute for firewood. The live-action host concludes that the greatest horrors come from the mind, when a cop suddenly arrives telling him to stop loitering, and the host leaves the alley, revealing that he is not wearing pants.
| 5 | 5 | "Who Violently Murdered Simon S. Salty?" | Bob Dorian | Mark Sheard | January 10, 2022 | 0.23 |
While getting dinner at the popular fast food restaurant Salty's, Pim and Charlie find founder Simon S. Salty dead in a back room. They call the police, who explain that the murder investigation division was moved to a separate company due to budget cuts. Mr. Boss then calls and informs them that the Smiling Friends are, in fact, the police's new division. They interrogate Salty's team of living mascots, all of whom display alarmingly unhinged behavior. They eventually recover security footage from the discontinued "century egg" mascot that reveals that Salty had ultimately died of a heart attack from his own unhealthy diet (ironically, after eating what he swore would be his last burger before changing his lifelong eating habits), but that all of his mascots later separately attempted to kill him for their own reasons, unaware that they were attacking a corpse. Gleefully, after they are declared innocent, the mascots leave the restaurant and immediately begin to wreak havoc in public. Post-credits scene: The Friends bury the century egg somewhere in China at his request, only for Charlie to dig him back up when Pim wonders what he tasted like.
| 6 | 6 | "Enchanted Forest" | Georgia Kriss | Jakub Zieba | January 10, 2022 | 0.21 |
While on a mission to help the princess of the nearby Enchanted Forest smile for a portrait, Pim and Charlie get sidetracked by a hobbit-like forest dweller named Mip. Charlie undertakes several quests despite his earlier apathy towards doing so, causing Pim, who wanted to do the quests beforehand, to accidentally kill Mip in a jealous Gollum-esque struggle. Remorseful, he and Charlie give the princess the gift Mip had intended for her, but she reveals that Mip was her stalker. Inside the box is a bomb, which she frantically discards in a panic before finally smiling upon learning of his demise, much to the duo's confusion. Post-credits scene: Back at the office, Charlie has an allergic reaction to a "potion" Mip had urged him to drink on a quest, claiming it was a cure for headaches.
| 7 | 7 | "Frowning Friends" | Bob Dorian | Michael Harris | January 10, 2022 | 0.21 |
A rival company called the "Frowning Friends", run by a pair of lookalikes named Grim and Gnarly, moves in across the street, and besmirch the Smiling Friends' reputation when they begin spreading gloom across the town. As the company's profits plummet, Mr. Boss has a psychotic break and attempts to assassinate Grim. Grim sobs and begs for his life in front of his supporters, revealing that his nihilistic attitude was a sham and causing former Frowning Friends patrons to boycott the company. Mr. Boss convinces Grim and Gnarly to smile for the first time, only for them to be killed by passing "Renaissance men" on horseback, to the consternation of Pim and Charlie.
| 8 | 8 | "Charlie Dies and Doesn't Come Back" | Bob Dorian | David Hootselle | January 10, 2022 | 0.22 |
While fetching a Christmas tree for the office on Christmas Eve, Pim and Charlie argue about the latter's pessimistic attitude until a tree falls on Charlie and gruesomely kills him. He awakens in Hell, which has frozen over as Satan is suffering from a bout of depression. Charlie travels to Satan's castle and offers to make him smile, on the condition that Satan must send him back to Earth if he succeeds. Satan finally smiles after harming Charlie, realizes that torturing people gives him pleasure, and tries to back out of their deal, only for God (Gilbert Gottfried) to send Charlie back to Earth during his funeral. An elderly Glep, who has been narrating the episode the entire time, informs his grandson that the story is true and that Christian Hell is real before wishing the audience a Merry Christmas. Notes: This was Gilbert Gottfried's final acting performance to be released before his death in April 2022. A puppet version of this episode aired on April Fools' Day 2024.
| 9 | 9 | "The Smiling Friends Go to Brazil!" | Paul ter Voorde | Michael Dockery, Michael Harris & Mark Sheard | August 6, 2022 | 0.27 |
The Smiling Friends arrive in Brazil, only to discover that Pim forgot to book the hotel as he assumed Allan was responsible for doing so. They try to book another hotel nearby, but learn everything is completely booked as they arrived in the middle of Mardi Gras. The crew get seated at Galeão International Airport restaurant and call Mr. Boss for advice, but he offers nothing. Ultimately, the gang accepts that their best option is to catch the next flight back home, unaware of a plane that is about to crash into a mountain in the background. Note: This episode is presented as a single shot.

=== Season 2 (2024) ===
| No. overall | No. in season | Title | Directed by | Storyboarded by | Original release date | US viewers (millions) |
|---|---|---|---|---|---|---|
| 10 | 1 | "Gwimbly: Definitive Remastered Enhanced Extended Edition DX 4K (Anniversary Director's Cut)" | Paul ter Voorde | James Cunningham, Michael Cusack, Michael Dockery & Zach Hadel | April 1, 2024 | 0.13 |
Pim and Allan try to help washed-up video game mascot Gwimbly after he ends up on the company's doorstep by getting his parent company to make him a new game. When the CEO refuses, they decide to crowdfund the game themselves, leaving him enraged that they are using his intellectual property without permission. As he hunts them with the company's new mascot, Troglor, the trio discovers that Gwimbly's ex-nemesis is busy with his family life and his sidekick has died of a fentanyl overdose. Meanwhile, a violent, burly man named James breaks into the Smiling Friends' office. He forces Charlie to do increasingly degrading things to (unsuccessfully) make him smile, culminating in him tearing Charlie's nose off. The CEO chases Pim, Allan, and Gwimbly into the office, where James stabs the CEO to death; satisfied by this, he finally smiles and leaves. Gwimbly and Troglor later join a Super Smash Bros.-esque crossover fighting game, with Mr. Boss also joining as a playable character. Post-credits scene: James drunkenly expresses remorse for how he treated Charlie, believing Charlie to be the only person who truly cared about him.
| 11 | 2 | "Mr. President" | Tina Tomar | Michael Cusack, Michael Dockery & Zach Hadel | May 13, 2024 | 0.28 |
Pim and Charlie get a call from the concurrently running and very unpopular President of the United States, the unhygienic and unintelligent Jimble (Mike Bocchetti), requesting help in winning the upcoming election. He is struggling to run against his rival Squiggly Miggly as well as the sudden nomination of Mr. Frog, who gains countrywide support despite him openly reveling in extremely violent behavior. Their attempts at earning him a higher approval rating fail as Jimble soils himself during a speech, inadvertently crashes the economy trying to make everyone rich, and establishes a foreign policy with an infamous dictator that has committed genocide against an entire race of people. While walking out in frustration, Charlie accidentally discovers a secret society of worms in the White House basement that are trying to sabotage the vote in favor of Mr. Frog, but accidentally persuades them into supporting Jimble instead upon revealing that frogs eat worms. At the Presidential Debate, a despondent Jimble admits that he was utterly incompetent as President and expresses remorse, swinging public favor in his direction. However, a single vote submitted by Glep causes Mr. Frog to win the election anyway via the electoral vote. Glep is doxxed by the news as he is angrily confronted by his friends, but they change their minds after his unintelligible explanation. Post-credits scene: Jimble relaxes at a beach and enjoys retirement, taking advice Charlie had given him earlier in the episode.
| 12 | 3 | "A Allan Adventure" | Paul ter Voorde | Michael Dockery, Jake Ganz, Paul Georghiou, Paul ter Voorde & Sheldon Vella | May 20, 2024 | 0.18 |
Mr. Boss tasks Allan with buying more paperclips for the office. Allan obtains them from an electronics store, but is faced with various obstacles and misadventures before he can make it back to the office - namely a thief, a helicopter chase with the U.S. Air Force, a Sasquatch, a crew of undead pirates, and finally a massive leviathan that swallows Allan and ejects him from its blowhole. He washes ashore with the box of paperclips, but opens it to find it empty aside from a ransom note telling him to retrieve the paperclips from his own apartment complex. There, he meets his landlord, who reveals he orchestrated the entire escapade to get Allan to spend time playing Burnout: Revenge for the PS2 with him, threatening to detonate a bomb that will ravage the entire city if he refuses. Allan reluctantly complies before using a paperclip to defuse the bomb. Ashamed at having been outsmarted, the landlord commits seppuku. Allan returns to the office with the paperclips and is rewarded with a miniature figurine of Mr. Boss. Uninterested in keeping it, he gives it to Charlie instead. Post-credits scene: The landlord resurrects in a morgue, swearing that Allan will hang out with him again.
| 13 | 4 | "Erm, the Boss Finds Love?" | David Hootselle & Anthony Price | Michael Dockery, Paul Georghiou & David Hootselle | May 27, 2024 | 0.28 |
After Mr. Boss marries a malformed succubus named Brittney, the company undergoes a complete rebrand under her influence. Suspecting Brittney of having sinister intentions, Pim, Charlie, and Allan do more research on YouTube and learn that "Brittney" is actually Filia Diabolus, the daughter of Satan who manifests every 100 years to kill influential men and grant their belongings to her father, and that the only way to defeat her is to kill her during a full moon. Since the moon is full that night, they race to Brittney's castle (except for Allan, who leaves for an appointment with a "Doctor Monster"). Pim's attempt to stab her in her sleep fails when the knife Charlie had drunkenly purchased from a fellow wedding attendee turns out to be a prop. Still, she wakes up and becomes so distraught upon learning of their intentions (though she admits that their assumptions were correct) that she jumps out a window, becoming fatally impaled by her own rose bush. Mr. Boss thanks them for freeing him and declares that his true love is his work before singing to the uncomfortable employees. Post-credits scene: Mr. Boss (who obtained 25% of Hell following Brittney's death) and Satan argue over fence line property boundaries. Note: Doug Walker makes a cameo appearance in this episode, portraying a parody of his Nostalgia Critic persona as a demonology-focused YouTuber whose videos Pim, Charlie, and Allan consult for information.
| 14 | 5 | "Brother's Egg" | Anthony Price | Tijmen Raasveld & Jakub Zieba | June 3, 2024 | 0.20 |
Pim and Charlie are called to help aspiring mad scientist Daniel "Professor Psychotic" create life. As Daniel explains his plan, his older brother Doug (Joel Haver) enters to complain about his lack of volume control and inability to find a proper job, ultimately evicting him. Charlie has lunch with Daniel to console him and help him find a new purpose in life, but the effort is unsuccessful as Daniel unintentionally scares away a waitress. Meanwhile, Pim visits Doug at his job at a construction site to convince him to give Daniel another chance, and is successful after they witness Doug's coworker mourn his estranged brother being crushed to death. Pim and Charlie mediate an intervention between the brothers, which devolves into a physical altercation after Daniel accuses Doug of being addicted to painkillers and not being present for their mother, leading up to her death. One of Daniel's eggs then hatches, revealing a homunculus who implores the brothers to stop fighting. Astounded by this discovery, the brothers resolve to put aside their differences and raise the homunculus together before sharing a tearful embrace. Post-credits scene: Allan cries over a film that is also about estranged brothers reconciling, despite disliking it before Pim and Charlie's departure. In contrast, Mr. Boss cries over his inability to revert his face to normal after he had changed it into a dog's face earlier.
| 15 | 6 | "Charlie, Pim, and Bill vs the Alien" | David Hootselle | David Hootselle | June 10, 2024 | 0.17 |
Pim takes Charlie to his UFO sighting group – Bill, Duncan, and Fillmore (David Firth). The meeting proves uneventful until a UFO arrives and abducts Pim, Charlie, and Bill – the latter of whom is dissected and eaten. The aliens that abducted the trio are then abducted by a different alien race, who are hosting a party that Pim and Charlie unwillingly participate in. The hosts (Mike Stoklasa and Rich Evans) implore Pim and Charlie to vaporize a populated planet as a "prank", promising to take them home if they do and threatening to place them in an eternal torture chamber if they refuse. They reluctantly comply, only for the aliens to reveal that the planet was devoid of life, the torture device was fake, and the ship can't fly backward, rendering them unable to return home. During the ensuing argument between Charlie and the aliens, the police arrive to arrest them for destroying public property and disturbing the peace. As the partygoers flee, Pim and Charlie manage to hijack a flying saucer owned by the grey aliens and fly back to Earth, which they discover is flat and encased in a glass dome. Post-credits scene: Duncan and Fillmore have been falsely imprisoned for Bill's murder and Charlie and Pim's disappearances. Note: The official description for the episode is intentionally false, describing Pim in the plot of Mars Needs Moms.
| 16 | 7 | "The Magical Red Jewel (aka Tyler Gets Fired)" | Jeff Liu | Max Collins, Tijmen Raasveld & James White | June 17, 2024 | 0.27 |
After firing an employee named Tyler, Mr. Boss informs the Friends that he must journey to the foreign country Spamtopia to purchase a magical red jewel. Pim accompanies him, as he speaks the local language, Spamish, having learned from his childhood pen pal Oscar. While obtaining the jewel from the elusive "Mr. Jester", Pim accidentally breaks Spamtopia's sole law by making eye contact with Mr. Jester, who, revealing himself to be the ruler of Spamtopia, sentences the two to death. However, he turns out to be Oscar and spares them after remembering Pim, ultimately eschewing the law entirely; Spamtopia thus descends into anarchy. Meanwhile, Mr. Boss has tasked Allan, Glep, and Charlie with babysitting his teenage son Jason, but Jason inexplicably dies shortly after Mr. Boss and Pim leave. Mr. Boss is initially horrified, but uses the jewel to resurrect Jason, who sprouts butterfly wings. Charlie attempts to inquire about a manifesto he found hidden in Mr. Boss's desk. Still, the glittery dust spread by Jason deafens and blinds everyone whilst triggering the building's alarms and sprinklers before Jason lunges at the audience. Post-credits scene: Tyler, while at a bar with Charlie, resolves to focus on a music career instead of returning to Smiling Friends.
| 17 | 8 | "Pim Finally Turns Green" | Paul Georghiou | Paul Georghiou & Michael Cusack | June 24, 2024 | 0.21 |
The Friends build a snowman out of garbage, naming it Rotten (Dana Snyder). Rotten comes to life after Pim attaches a radioactive daffodil to its head, and Pim decides to teach him about the pleasures of life. Pim denies Rotten's request to visit the beach, claiming the sun will kill him. Horrified at the concept of death, Rotten suffers an existential crisis and starts screaming uncontrollably. Charlie enlists Bill Nye to teach Rotten that death is natural and not something to fear, but Nye dies when his hot air balloon flies into power lines. Pim and Charlie leave Rotten on a snowy mountain so he can live forever, but he is returned to the office by a frustrated yeti. Glep suggests storing Rotten in the office freezer, which initially leaves him content, but as time passes, he becomes depressed. As the Friends leave for a trip to the beach, Pim realizes he can take Rotten by putting him inside a cooler, but he melts when another beachgoer accidentally knocks it over. As they mourn him, he suddenly reappears as an ocean wave, along with the ghost of Bill Nye. Post-credits scene: The Friends question the logistics of Rotten's new state of being before he consumes a boat and sends a tsunami towards the shoreline as horrified beachgoers evacuate. Note: The title and official description for the episode are intentionally false. The description states: "After eating a mysterious artifact found at an ancient burial ground, Pim suddenly and mysteriously turns bright green to everyone's dismay."

=== Season 3 (2025–26) ===
All episodes in this season are directed by David Hootselle under an "episode director" credit. Saerom Animation, who previously provided additional animation services on three episodes, also does animation production on the series going forward, with different animation directors credited per episode. The final two episodes however, were animated by Titmouse Vancouver.

| No. overall | No. in season | Title | Animation directed by | Storyboarded by | Original release date | US viewers (millions) |
|---|---|---|---|---|---|---|
| 18 | 1 | "Silly Samuel" | Yong-Taek Choi | David Hootselle | October 5, 2025 | 0.48 |
The Smiling Friends get a call from a ridiculous-looking man named Silly Samuel (Conner O'Malley), who is upset that no one takes him seriously due to his bizarre appearance. Pim and Charlie's various attempts to help him fail, as his physique renders him unable to wear clothes, get plastic surgery, or even remotely alter his body without fatal consequences, and he is unwilling to embrace his nature to become a circus performer. Meanwhile, a building inspector performs a surprise inspection of the Smiling Friends office, during which a nail keeping the building in place is released, causing it to roll down the street toward a nearby park full of onlookers laughing at Silly Samuel. He attempts to warn them while also berating them with truthful yet controversial and profanity-laden statements about other topics. Glep stops the building before it crushes anyone; realizing that he was telling the truth, the onlookers label Silly Samuel a "prophet" and carry him off as he smiles. The building inspector thanks Mr. Boss for entertaining him despite the building's abysmal quality before turning into dust. Post-credits scene: Mr. Boss and the Smiling Friends attempt to put the office back into place, but let go of it and cause it to roll down the streets again, ultimately deciding to give up and go out for ribs.
| 19 | 2 | "Le Voyage Incroyable de Monsieur Grenouille" | Jong Wan Ryu, Hyun Soo Park, Se-Hyun Park, Yong-Taek Choi & Sang-Taek Oh | Hannah Daigle | October 12, 2025 | 0.35 |
After Mr. Frog assimilates the entire planet under his leadership, he finds himself dissatisfied and resigns from his new role as "emperor of earth", declaring a discarded peanut as his successor. Pim and Charlie find him depressed in a bar and offer to help him smile again. Frog joins the Ultimate Fighting Championship, where he kills all of his opponents with sheer durability despite not even trying to fight back. After Pim mentions family in a song about life's pleasures, Frog travels to his father's (Creed Bratton) cabin. Frog's father reveals that Frog's mother has recently died of cancer, then berates Frog for his psychopathic behavior and abandonment of his family, ultimately disowning and ejecting him. While meditating in the forest, Frog achieves inner peace and subsequently enters a realm where he meets the "Bug of Knowledge". After eating the bug, Frog experiences a series of visions highlighting significant moments in his life and career. Content, he transforms into a photorealistic frog, smiles, and says, "Goodbye." Post-credits scene: Pim returns to the Smiling Friends office, now disfigured after being assaulted by Mr. Frog earlier in the episode.
| 20 | 3 | "Mole Man" | Yong-Taek Choi, Sang-Taek Oh, Hyun Soo Park & Jong Wan Ryu | Paul ter Voorde | October 19, 2025 | 0.16 |
Pim and Charlie fall through a sinkhole in the office and become trapped in the lair of Mole Man (David Firth), an anthropomorphic naked mole-rat who has become obsessed with the duo after overhearing their banter over the years. Mole Man prods the duo to compliment his penis, which he is deeply insecure about. Charlie refuses, causing a hysterical Mole Man to chase them through a series of underground tunnels. Meanwhile, Mr. Boss christens Glep and Allan the "new Smiling Friends" upon learning that Pim and Charlie likely did not survive the fall, and sends them to help a single mother, Maurine, with her triplets. The children wreak havoc until Pim, Charlie, and Mole Man emerge from a vent in Maurine's house as she returns. Mole Man inadvertently exposes himself to her, but she finds his penis attractive. He agrees to marry her and stepfather her children, renouncing his obsession with the Smiling Friends, who agree that Mole Man's penis is rather unassuming and not "disgusting" as he had led them to believe. Post-credits scene: Mr. Boss dances in place in front of the office in an attempt to cope with his grief, not realizing when the Friends return with Pim and Charlie alive.
| 21 | 4 | "Curse of the Green Halloween Witch" | Hyun Soo Park | Tijmen Raasveld | November 2, 2025 | 0.43 |
| 21 | 4 | "Curse of the Green Halloween Witch" | Hyun Soo Park | Tijmen Raasveld | April 1, 2026 (Ghosts ‘n Chainsaws extension) | 0.43 |
The Friends contemplate what to order for lunch, repeatedly ignoring Pim when he suggests pizza. A mysterious green-skinned witch then arrives at the office asking for change. Pim tries to give it to her, but the other Friends refuse, and she curses them. The power then goes out, and the Friends undergo some disturbing changes - Glep is possessed, Charlie melts, Allan turns into a spider, and Mr. Boss is taunted by an apparition of his deceased mother. Encouraged by demons who insist that the others do not respect him, Pim goes into a blind rage and murders the Friends. This is all then revealed to be a vision the witch is showing them from her orb to demonstrate what will happen if they do not give her money. Mr. Boss chokes her, and Charlie apologizes to Pim for his earlier behavior. Spider Allan returns with pizza, to the confusion of regular Allan and the others, only for him and Mr. Boss to be run over by cars. Post-credits scene: The witch returns home, where her boyfriend comforts her as she cries, but asks if she will still perform oral sex on him later.
| 22 | 5 | "Pim and Charlie Save Mother Nature" | Sang-Taek Oh | Paul ter Voorde | November 9, 2025 | 0.36 |
While vacationing at Mr. Boss's remote cabin, Charlie hopes to get a valuable photograph of the legendary "Brown Blur" cryptid Mr. Boss has a painting of. He and Pim instead encounter Moth Man (Jim Norton), and an anthropomorphized Mother Nature who is upset when Charlie throws an empty soda can onto the ground. They blame the littering on Moth Man, then clean up the various trash hikers have left in the forest. Mother Nature thanks them for restoring her to health before fatally crushing Moth Man under a tree as revenge for littering. A mushroom overhears Pim scolding Charlie and informs Mother Nature, who then furiously attacks and tries to eat Charlie. Meanwhile, Mr. Boss tries to convince Allan to relax and stop thinking about work, leading to a tryst between the two. Realizing that Allan, Mr. Boss, and Glep will not save them, Pim throws the soda can into Mother Nature's mouth, killing her. Pim and Charlie return to the cabin, where Mr. Boss reveals that the "Brown Blur" painting was actually a photograph of the inside of his anus during a colonoscopy. Post-credits scene: Moth Man's father tearfully attempts to deliver a eulogy at his funeral.
| 23 | 6 | "Squim Returns" | Yong-Taek Choi, Sang-Taek Oh, Hyun Soo Park & Jong Wan Ryu | David Hootselle | November 16, 2025 | 0.16 |
When Charlie feigns illness to skip work and play a new video game and Allan and Glep travel to an anime convention, Mr. Boss rehires Squim, the "first-ever Smiling Friend," to help Pim with a job. Pim initially enjoys Squim's positivity, but becomes annoyed when Squim inappropriately attempts to cheer up an ice cream man mourning his late wife. Meanwhile, Mr. Boss views Charlie's Steam activity and calls him to berate him for lying, threatening to fire him if he does not arrive by noon. On the bus, Charlie actually falls ill and vomits, causing the bus to crash. He deliriously stumbles toward the office, causing traffic collisions and eventually stripping naked. As police surround him, Squim attempts to de-escalate the situation by dancing and is shot. His soul emerges from his body and continues dancing, but is also shot. In the hospital, a doctor informs Charlie that he was infected by a parasite in a kebab he ate earlier. Mr. Boss commends Charlie's loyalty to him and reveals that Squim's soul survived after surgery. Post-credits scene: At the convention, a man asks Glep and Allan for a photo, but Allan declines. The man chases him, shouting that he loves him. Note: The official description for the episode is intentionally false, stating: "After buying a magic mirror, Pim meets Squim. Charlie starts "digging deep" and gets into some really bad internet stuff…like REALLY bad stuff."
| 24 | 7 | "Shmaloogles" | Yong-Taek Choi, Sang-Taek Oh, Hyun Soo Park & Jong Wan Ryu | Tijmen Raasveld & Jakub Zieba | November 23, 2025 | 0.29 |
Pim and Charlie are called to help a kingdom of happy creatures called the Shmaloogles. Believing he cannot contribute, Charlie attempts to leave, but Pim and a Shmaloogle are suddenly kidnapped by a wizard. The Shmaloogles are unfazed by the kidnapping until Charlie rallies them and trains them to storm the castle. Meanwhile, the wizard confides to Pim that he is balding and uses the Shmaloogles' blood to prevent further hair loss. Charlie and the Shmaloogles suddenly swarm the castle and subdue the wizard, prompting Pim to reveal the reason he was kidnapping them. Charlie suggests finasteride and minoxidil, claiming they have worked for him in the past, to which the wizard agrees. With the differences settled, everyone celebrates at Wawa. The King of the Shmaloogles mentions that he saw Charlie take a photo up Princess Shmaloogle's skirt during the castle raid. Charlie angrily maintains his innocence, pointing out that he left his phone at the office, causing the King to meekly retract the accusation. Post-credits scene: Mr. Boss and a friend of his watch the film Clerks II, accompanied by its lead actor Brian O'Halloran, though Mr. Boss ignores O'Halloran when he attempts to explain production processes from the film.
| 25 | 8 | "The Glep Ep" | Yong-Taek Choi, Sang-Taek Oh, Hyun Soo Park & Jong Wan Ryu | Tijmen Raasveld & Jakub Zieba; Hannah Daigle (uncredited) | November 30, 2025 | 0.16 |
The Smiling Friends receive their end-of-year performance analysis from Mr. Boss. Glep's absence confuses Mr. Boss, who is angered after hearing that Glep apparently does nothing all day. Glep quits after being confronted, retreating to his mansion where his wife leaves him over his frequent absence. Depressed, Glep travels to a bar and recounts his life story – born in 329 AD, his presence led to the fall of the Western Roman Empire, the Black Death, and being shunned by the Founding Fathers of the United States, forcing him to live a lonely life as a loiterer. The bar's patrons, horrified by his role in the Black Death, eject him. Upon arriving at a bus stop, Glep recalls comforting a destitute and suicidal Mr. Boss in 1992 after he suffered the brunt of a market crash, thus inspiring the latter to found Smiling Friends. Glep returns to find that the Smiling Friends have fallen into disarray without him. Mr. Boss is inspired to rehire him, and the Friends enjoy Christmas dinner with their loved ones. Post-credits scene: The bar's patrons pray for the victims of the Black Death.
| 26 | 9 | "Friend-Bot (Version 12589218731809213528796879521)" | Tim Larade | Jakub Zieba | April 12, 2026 | N/A |
The Smiling Friends' latest client, a morbidly obese bedbound man, cancels his job shortly before dying from a heart attack. Pim and Charlie then decide to take his robotic servant, Friend-Bot, back to the office. The bot is capable of performing a variety of tasks, allowing the Smiling Friends employees to cease working. Pim finds himself lost without the chance to make people smile, though seeing his depression, Friend-Bot offers Pim the chance to make the entire world smile should he so request. Before Pim can follow through with executing his request, an argument erupts between the Smiling Friends workers, as Glep finally pulls off Friend-Bot's head to reveal the robot was an Indian man in a metal suit the whole time. He outsourced his various tasks to other people and software over the internet, and pretended to be a robot following advice from a website on how to make friends. After he leaves the office, the Smiling Friends reconcile with each other. Post-credits scene: Charlie reveals that he had all the fat he gained from earlier chopped off, returning his body to its normal shape.
| 27 | 10 | "Charlie's Uncle Dies and Doesn't Come Back" | Tim Larade | Hannah Daigle | April 12, 2026 | N/A |
Charlie and Pim are requested to make the former's Uncle Bilbert smile, as he claims to be dying of a terminal illness. Bilbert (accompanied by his pet rottweiler) requests Pim and Charlie accompany him to a drug dealer, a strip club, and an illegal 3D-character cockfighting ring, the latter of which leads the group to be arrested. While locked in the holding cell, Bilbert nearly strangles Pim to death until Charlie punches him. Bilbert claims this is what he has always wanted, his 30 years of abuse towards Charlie were just a "test" to make Charlie finally stand up for himself, and he never had a terminal illness. Though Pim and Charlie are released with a verbal warning, the police keep Bilbert locked up on suspicion of being a sex criminal who they have been tracking for years, which Bilbert confirms was not a part of his test. Meanwhile, Allan goes on a blind date with an attractive woman, which ends with the couple frolicking in the sand, though they are interrupted by Bilbert's rottweiler tearing off the woman's face, revealing her to be Allan's landlord in disguise. The landlord then runs away, swearing he will hang out with Allan again. Post-credits scene: Mr. Boss tells his employees he will be more serious, only to prank Charlie with a joy buzzer, and return to his wacky self.

== Shorts ==
Two short films labeled Smiling Shorts were released on Adult Swim's YouTube channel before the third season's release. A third short was released following the first eight episodes of season three.

| No. | Title | Original release date |
|---|---|---|
| 1 | "Pim's New Eyes" | July 22, 2025 |
Pim has surgery to shrink his large eyes to a smaller size, only for Charlie to reveal that he had appreciated this particular imperfection since they first met.
| 2 | "Roy Dismey" | August 24, 2025 |
A whimsical floating creature named Roy Dismey leaves after receiving the Smiling Friends' service, pickpocketing Pim and Charlie of their possessions in the process.
| 3 | "Card Game" | March 26, 2026 |
The Smiling Friends play a card game when Pim draws a "Devil Demon Card", which summons a demon.

In addition to these, a number of guest-animated promotional shorts have been released. These include Smiling Friends Employee Training Software Walkthrough, directed by Paul Robertson and Michelle Larney, Smiling Symphonies (parody of Looney Tunes/Merrie Melodies), directed by Aron Fromm, Smiling Ball Z (parody of Dragon Ball Z), directed by Shane Dering and Ghosts & Chainsaws (part of Spook Train), directed by Lee Hardcastle. The latter short is a full-length version of the film shown in the beginning of the episode "Curse of the Green Halloween Witch".

== Production ==
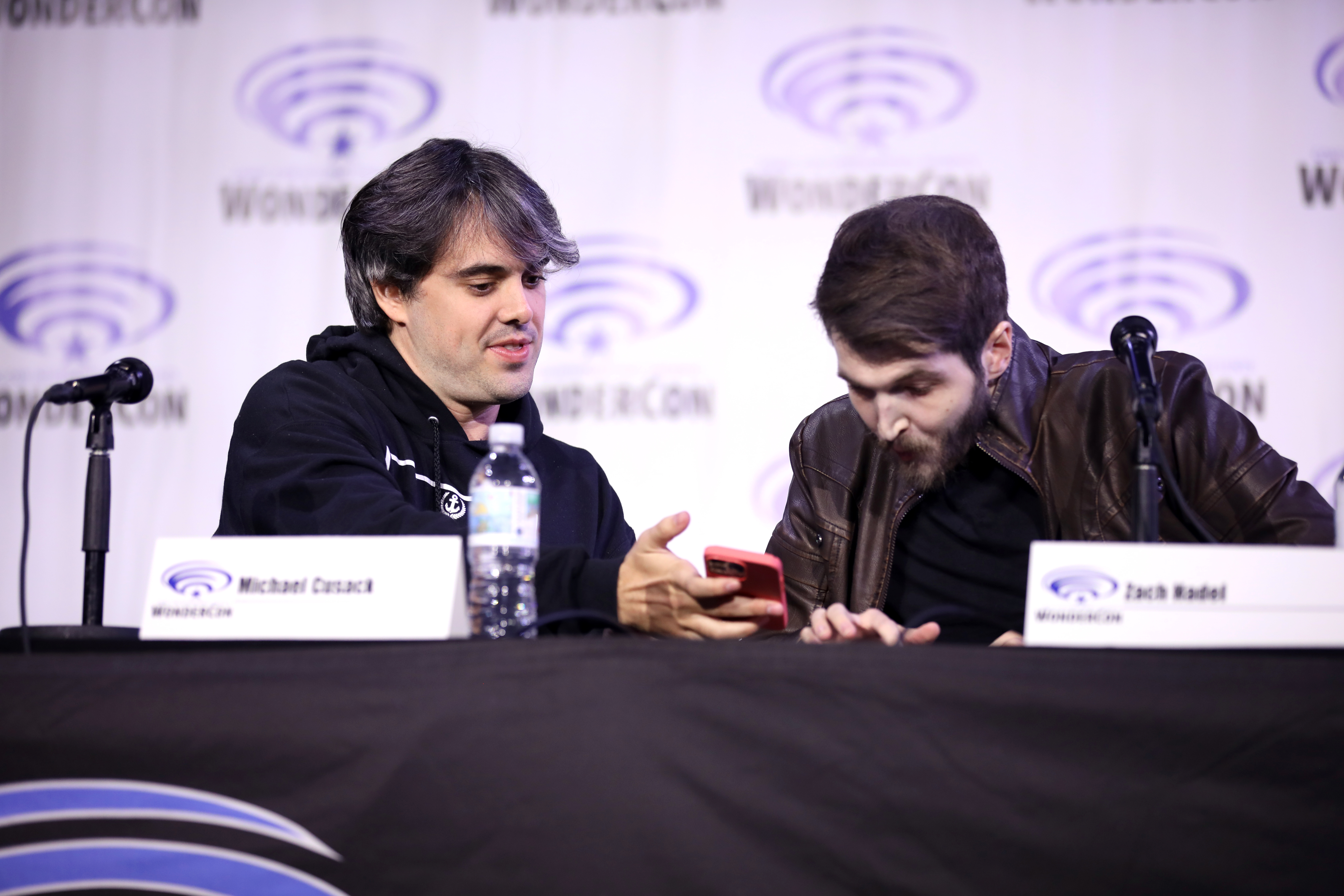
Creators Michael Cusack (left) and Zach Hadel (right) at Wondercon 2024

Smiling Friends was created by animators Zach Hadel and Michael Cusack, noted for their individual successes as content creators for Newgrounds and YouTube. Already well-acquainted with each other online, the pair conceived the idea for the show in 2017 whilst dining at Gus's Chicken in Burbank, California (during a visit from Cusack, who is based in Melbourne). Hadel stated in an interview that the pair's goal for the show was to base it around "a group of lovable characters, with a simple kind of concept, which we could take anywhere we wanted to". They settled upon the premise of a hotline for people who were unhappy, which became "the connective tissue that made it all click together". He said that although "the company is an important aspect of the show, it's really the springboard" and that they "have episodes where it's not even about the job at all". The pair singled out South Park and Seinfeld as amongst the show's biggest influences. The duo developed the show's art style as a 50/50 blend of their own individual styles, though Cusack noted that his own drawings tend to go through a "final Zach gloss". Early in development, the series went under the working title Little Helpers, with an entirely different cast.

Hadel and Cusack pitched the series to Cartoon Network, which greenlit production on the pilot for the network's nighttime programming block Adult Swim in 2018. Hadel had previously attempted to sell his and Chris O'Neill's web series Hellbenders to the network, but the project was not picked up while an independently produced pilot was shelved during production. O'Neill would later compose the Smiling Friends theme song. Meanwhile, Cusack created the Rick and Morty parody Bushworld Adventures, which premiered as an April Fool's Day stunt on the network in 2018, and also created the series YOLO, which premiered in August 2020.

The Smiling Friends pilot, which the pair consider the first official episode, aired on Adult Swim on April 1, 2020, to positive reviews and became the most viewed episode of any show on the network's website. The network subsequently ordered seven additional episodes in May 2021. Serving as showrunners, Hadel and Cusack were hands on in all aspects of production, from writing, storyboards, character designs, final animation and sound design, which the duo considered unusual for an adult animated series. According to Hadel, the budget for the entire first season was equivalent to that of a single episode of Family Guy (an estimated US$2,000,000).

Adult Swim renewed the series for a second season on February 9, 2022. On May 18, 2022, Hadel announced on Twitter that a special would be released sometime before the second season. A listing for an episode titled "The Smiling Friends Go to Brazil!" appeared on Rotten Tomatoes on July 21, and was confirmed by Hadel and Cusack at Adult Swim's San Diego Comic-Con panel the next day. It aired on August 6, 2022. Lead-in promotion to the episode purposely suggested a more conventional vacation episode than what was actually presented, with a poster of the Smiling Friends relaxing on a Brazilian beach, and a summary suggesting that the episode would be about the gang relaxing in a beautiful Brazilian beach town.

During Adult Swim's panel at New York Comic Con in October 2023, it was confirmed that the second season would premiere in 2024, and would continue to explore a variety of animation styles, such as stylized 2D, 3D, stop motion, flash animation, rotoscoping, and live-action content.

On June 13, 2024, at Annecy International Animation Film Festival, it was announced the series was renewed for three additional seasons.

The first two seasons were primarily animated by Studio Yotta and Princess Bento Studio, a joint venture between the Melbourne-based media company Princess Pictures and the American animation studio Bento Box Entertainment. The studio has additionally worked on Cusack's other animated series, such as season 2 of YOLO and the Hulu original series Koala Man. Since Cusack lives in Australia and Hadel lives in the United States, the show is produced remotely. Starting with the release of season 3 in 2025, production was fully moved to Williams Street in-house, with additional animation services being handled by Saerom Animation in South Korea and Dinamita Animación in Colombia, with specialty animation done by ZAM Studios: a new Los Angeles-based studio founded by Cusack, Hadel and Aron Fromm. The final two episodes of the third season (and by extension, the series overall), however, were animated by Titmouse in Vancouver alongside ZAM still providing specialty animation for those episodes.

== Broadcast ==
The pilot initially premiered on Adult Swim on April 1, 2020, during the network's April Fools Day event.

The series officially premiered on January 10, 2022, at 12:00 a.m. with the episodes "Mr. Frog" and "Shrimp's Odyssey". The rest of the series was then broadcast in an unannounced premiere marathon in its entirety starting from 12:30 a.m. followed by a repeat at 3:00 a.m. The episodes would re-air with two separate episodes airing in the intended premiere slots for the following 4 weeks afterwards, including another marathon on the night of February 13, most likely to pick up viewers tuning away from the end of Super Bowl LVI, as well as to promote the series's availability through HBO Max and the recent news of renewal for the series.

In Canada, the series premiered simultaneously on Adult Swim with new episodes airing weekly. The series later premiered on E4 in the United Kingdom on January 21, 2022, and Adult Swim in France on January 24, 2022.

The series was made available to stream on HBO Max in the United States and StackTV in Canada on February 9, 2022.

The second season premiered on April 1, 2024, with the remaining episodes beginning to air on May 13; as an April Fool's Day prank, the premiere was preceded by airings of three season 1 episodes recreated using live action puppetry.

On April Fool's Day in 2026, Adult Swim aired a version of the season 3 episode "Curse of the Green Halloween Witch" with an extended version of the Ghosts & Chainsaws claymation film (animated by Lee Hardcastle) that was briefly seen at the beginning of the episode.

== Home media release ==
Warner Bros. Home Entertainment released the first season on DVD and Blu-ray on August 29, 2023.

== Reception ==
=== Critical response ===
Smiling Friends received positive reviews from critics. Lex Briscuso of Vulture praised the show's tone and animation style, particularly its use of "unnerving close-up cuts and creepy supporting character design". Margaret Lyons of The New York Times praised the show's humor and compared it favorably to Aqua Teen Hunger Force. Noah Dominguez of Comic Book Resources also made this comparison, and additionally praised the show as "unique" and commended its "bizarre humor" and "surrealist tone".

=== Accolades ===
For the 78th Primetime Creative Arts Emmy Awards, the series was nominated for Outstanding Animated Program.

== In other media ==
The show was parodied in the episode "Estranger Things" of The Simpsons in 2025. A parody of The Simpsons would later appear in the Smiling Friends episode "Squim Returns".

Pim, Charlie, and Mr. Boss appear in the Robot Chicken special The Robot Chicken Adult Swim Special, which premiered on August 30, 2026. The special serves as a crossover that celebrates Adult Swim's 25th anniversary, and also contains characters from Space Ghost Coast to Coast, Aqua Teen Hunger Force, Assy McGee, The Venture Bros., Harvey Birdman, Attorney at Law, Sealab 2021, Moral Orel, and Metalocalypse, among many others.

== See also ==
- Mixed media
