= Princess Pictures =

Australian film and television production company

Princess Pictures Pty. Ltd.
- Type: Private
- Industry: Film television
- Genre: Live action Animation
- Founded: 2003; 23 years ago
- Founder: Laura Waters
- Headquarters: Melbourne, Australia
- Key people: Laura Waters (producer); Emma Fitzsimons (MD); Mike Cowap (senior producer, scripted and unscripted)
- Subsidiaries: Boulder Media; Princess Bento Studio (Note: Princess Bento Studio is co-owned by Princess Pictures and American animation studio Bento Box Entertainment.)
- Website: princess.net.au

Princess Pictures Pty. Ltd. is an Australian film and television production company, located in South Melbourne, Victoria. Founded in 2003 by Laura Waters, the studio produces television series and feature films ranging from live-action to animation. The studio is best known for producing all six shows created by Chris Lilley for ABC TV, HBO, and Netflix.

The studio's first feature film I Love You Too released on 6 May 2010. Their live-action television credits include Summer Heights High, Lunatics, Superwog, How to Stay Married, Ja'mie: Private School Girl, Jonah from Tonga, Wrong Kind of Black, Last Days of the Space Age, and Planet Lulin. The studio also produced the animated series YOLO, Smiling Friends and Koala Man, both created by animator and voice actor Michael Cusack.

In 2022, Princess Pictures acquired the Irish animation studio Boulder Media from Hasbro.

== Princess Bento Studio ==
Princess Bento Studio
- Type: Joint venture
- Industry: Television
- Genre: Animation
- Founded: 8 April 2020; 6 years ago
- Founder: Scott Greenberg; Laura Waters
- Headquarters: Melbourne, Victoria, Australia
- Website: www.princessbento.com

Princess Bento Studio is an Australian animation studio based in South Melbourne, Victoria. The studio is a joint venture between Princess Pictures and Bento Box Entertainment.

Founded in 2020, The studio aims to create content for both local and international audiences following a first-look deal between the two companies a year prior. The studio is best known for producing the Adult Swim animated series Smiling Friends, as well as YOLO and Koala Man. They have also provided animation services for Hazbin Hotel, Mulligan, and Krapopolis.

=== Filmography ===
Title	First air date	Last air date	No. of seasons	Network	Notes
YOLO	9 August 2020	28 April 2025	3	Adult Swim	co-production with Monkeystack (season 1), Cusack Creatures, Princess Pictures and Williams Street
Smiling Friends	9 January 2022	12 April 2026	3	Adult Swim	co-production with Studio Yotta, Goblin Caught on Tape and Williams Street; First two seasons
Koala Man	9 January 2023		1	Hulu; Disney+ (Australia)	co-production with Cusack Creatures, Hermit House, Justin Roiland's Solo Vanity Card Productions!, Princess Pictures, Bento Box Entertainment and 20th Television Animation
Hazbin Hotel	19 January 2024	Present	2	Amazon Prime Video	co-production with SpindleHorse Toons, Bento Box Entertainment, A24 and Amazon MGM Studios
Universal Basic Guys	8 September 2024	Present	2	Fox	co-production with Mutsack, One Man Canoe, Sony Pictures Television, Bento Box Entertainment and Fox Entertainment
Dad's House	2027		TBA	Netflix	co-production with Cusack Creatures, Princess Pictures and Bento Box Entertainment
