= Sheldon Vella =

Australian comic book and storyboard artist

- Born: 25 September 1984 (age 42) Williamstown, Victoria, Australia
- Areas: Penciller, Inker, Letterer, Colourist

Sheldon Vella (born 25 September 1984) is an Australian comic book and storyboard artist.

He has worked on Nickelodeon's 2012 Teenage Mutant Ninja Turtles series and the Adult Swim series Smiling Friends for its latter episode, "A Allan Adventure".

== Bibliography ==
Interior comic work includes:

- Popgun (anthology graphic novel, Image):
  - "Supertron" (script and art, in Volume 1, 2007)
  - "Survival of the Festive" (script and art, in Volume 2, 2008)
- Pulpo Anthology #3: "Armed Philosophers" (with Jed MacKay, Pulpo Press, 2007)
- Meathaus S.O.S.: "End" (script and art, anthology graphic novel, Nerdcore, 2008)
- Supertron (script and art, webcomic, Zuda Comics, 2008–2010)
- Kill Audio #1-6 (with Claudio Sanchez and Chondra Echert, Boom! Studios, 2009–2010)
- The Black Cherry Bombshells pages 138-142 (with Johnny Zito and Tony Trov, webcomic, Zuda Comics, 2010)
- Marvel Knights: Strange Tales II #2: "Ghost Badge!" (script and art, anthology, Marvel, 2011)
- CBGB #2: "Oozi-Suzi-Q-Tip" (script and art, anthology, Boom! Studios, 2011)
- Deadpool vol. 2 #32, 36 (with Daniel Way, Marvel, 2011)
- Haunt #17-18 (with Robert Kirkman and Greg Capullo, Image, 2011)
- X-Men: To Serve and Protect #4: "Disco Highway" (with Jed MacKay, anthology, Marvel, 2011)
- Spider-Verse (with Jed MacKay, Marvel):
  - "With Great Power Comes No Future" (in vol. 1 #2, anthology, 2015)
  - "Earth-51178" (in vol. 3 #1, three pages among other artists, 2019)
- Vault of Spiders #1: "Final Galaxy Battle!" (with Jed MacKay, anthology, Marvel, 2018)

=== Covers only ===
- Pulpo Anthology #4 (Pulpo Press, 2009)
- The Amory Wars: In Keeping Secrets of Silent Earth 3 #5 (Boom! Studios, 2010)
- Godzilla: The Half-Century War #2 (IDW Publishing, 2012)
- Shirtless Bear-Fighter! #3 (Image, 2017)
