= Video Games (Tenacious D song) =

2023 single by Tenacious D

Single by Tenacious D
- Released: May 12, 2023
- Recorded: 2023
- Genre: Country rock, comedy
- Length: 1:16
- Label: Self-released
- Songwriters: Jack Black; Kyle Gass
- Producer: John Spiker

Tenacious D singles chronology
"Tenacious D's The Who Melody" (2022)	"Video Games" (2023)	"Wicked Game" (2023)

"Video Games" is a song by American comedy rock duo Tenacious D, released on May 12, 2023.

== Background ==
When asked about the meaning of the song, both Black and Gass said "It’s about growing up and leaving childish things behind…. But then realizing that video games are more than just mindless toys…. In fact, they can be a true expression of huge ideas that belong in the pantheon of great works of art! It’s about time someone defended the honor and integrity of this bold new horizon. Leave it to the greatest band in the world… Tenacious D!!!"

The song is primarily about Red Dead Redemption 2, but the lyrics of the song briefly references other games such as God of War and Fallout 4. The music video was animated by Adam Paloian's Pinreel Inc. production company, with YouTuber Chris O'Neill co-storyboarding the music video.

== Personnel ==
- Jack Black – vocals, acoustic guitar
- Kyle Gass – acoustic guitar
