= Reanimated collaboration =

Collaborative fan-made animation project

A reanimated collaboration (often shortened to reanimated collab or reanimate) is a type of collaborative fan film, usually involving fan-made animation, typically produced as a tribute to an existing film. The process involves each animator recreating one or more shots of an existing film in their own style. The individual works are then stitched into the original order and published on the internet as a completed collaboration.

This differs from a shot-for-shot recreation, as the goal of a reanimate is to display each of the independent animators' unique stylings rather than to produce a unified or identical result.

Multiple collaborations focus on media made a decade or more prior that receives renewed interest due to internet memes, nostalgia, or the death of a voice actor. As they are often non-profit tributes to an existing work, animators expect to receive little or no profit. Due to reanimated collaborations inherently being derivative works, they are sometimes subjects of takedown requests on the behalf of publishers for alleged copyright infringement, though it is often argued for reanimates to be transformative use.

== Notable examples ==
- Moon Animate Make-Up! (2014) – Over 250 animators collaborated to reanimate the 38th episode of the DiC English dub of Sailor Moon, "Fractious Friends" (1995). This project is considered to be the first major reanimated internet-collaboration, and eventually led to this style of video increasing in popularity during the late 2010s. As of 2022, the collaboration has over 2.75 million views. A sequel, Moon Animate Make-Up! 2 (2016) reanimated the original Japanese version of the 68th episode, "Protect Chibiusa! Clash of the 10 Warriors" (1993).
- Mama Luigi Project (2017) – 227 animators reanimated the 11-minute Super Mario World episode "Mama Luigi" (1991). Each of the 255 total scenes featured a different animation style. It was dedicated to the memories of Canadian actor Tony Rosato, who voiced Luigi, and Canadian actor Harvey Atkin, who voiced King Koopa. This project ultimately generated a resurgence of popularity in reanimated collaborations. The video has 6 million views as of 2022.
- The Dover Boys ReAnimated Collab! (2018) – A reanimated collab short film that marks the 76th anniversary of The Dover Boys at Pimento University (1942), over 90 independent animators recreated the short scene-for-scene with each animator drawing in their own style. The reanimated collaboration, titled The Dover Boys Reanimated Collab!, was curated by animator Josh 'Zeurel' Palmer and was released on August 27, 2018, on YouTube, receiving nearly three million views.
- Steamed Hams but There's a Different Animator Every 13 Seconds (2018) – Andrew Kepple of Albino Blacksheep hosted the project, which reanimated "Steamed Hams", a memorable sequence from the 1996 The Simpsons episode "22 Short Films About Springfield", that had a surge in popularity in the mid-2010s due to internet memes. As of 2026, the video has over 13 million views.
- Shrek Retold (2018) – A reanimated collab fan film in which over 200 animators, songwriters, and voice actors recreated Shrek (2001). 3GI is best known for organizing the Shrek-themed festival "Shrekfest" in Milwaukee, WI, held annually from 2014 to 2024. The reanimated collab contains mediums including 2D animation, 3D animation, live action, and stop-motion. Collaborators included David Liebe Hart, Michael Cusack, Ratboy Genius, Anthony Fantano, and SiIvaGunner.
- Kirby Reanimated Collab (2019) – Featuring over 300 artists, the project recreated the English dub of Kirby: Right Back at Ya! episode 49, "Cartoon Buffoon" (2003). The project was directed by Roya Shahidi, and it has received over 4 million views as of 2025. The project was taken down due to DMCA copyright claims multiple times, despite Nintendo claiming it was not behind the takedowns. The video is dedicated to animator Michael "Mikey" McBride (credited as AngelXMikey), who died from cystic fibrosis the day it was released.
- The Zelda CDi Reanimated Collab! (2020) – PatchToons hosted and released a 21-minute collaboration that recreated the cutscenes of The Legend of Zelda CDi games (1993), which were popularized in the mid-2000s and 2010s with YouTube Poop parodies. Over 200 animators collaborated on the project. It was also uploaded to animation website Newgrounds.
- The SpongeBob SquarePants Movie: Rehydrated! (2022) – A collaboration fan film between over 300 artists that recreated The SpongeBob SquarePants Movie (2004) as a tribute to late SpongeBob creator Stephen Hillenburg, who died of ALS in 2018. Similarly to Shrek Retold, the audio was re-dubbed and re-instrumented specifically to bypass YouTube's copyright restrictions. Despite this, the video was taken down due to a copyright claim from Paramount within an hour of the video's premiere. This takedown outraged fans and participants of the project, leading to the Twitter hashtag, #JusticeForSpongebob. The video has since been restored to YouTube and has over 7 million views as of 2025.
- Shrek 2 Retold (2026) – A collaboration fan film that was originally announced in an April Fools' Day video titled Shrek 2 Retold, in which the project director discussed the creation of Shrek Retold. Trailers for the project were released during Shrekfest 2019 and on the twentieth anniversary of Shrek 2 (2004). The movie premiered at the tenth Shrekfest via an in-person screening at the Oriental Theatre MKE on September 3, 2023. On September 20, 2024, it was announced that the film was delayed indefinitely, and would be released when finished. On January 29, 2026, it was announced that the film was still in progress.
- The SpongeBob Movie: Sponge Out of Water: Resurfaced (TBA) – A collaboration fan film, based on the 2015 film The SpongeBob Movie: Sponge Out of Water.

== See also ==
- Animutation
- Comic jam
- Exquisite corpse
- Experimental animation
- Fan film
- Fan labor
- Independent animation
- YouTube Poop
