= Seth Rogen's Hilarity for Charity =

- Directed by: Ryan Polito
- Written by: Seth Rogen; Sean O'Connor; Matthew Bass; Nate Fernald; Chase Mitchell; Zachary Rice; Alex Rubens; Beth Stelling
- Cinematography: Andrew Wehde
- Edited by: Hector Lopez; Nathan Morgan
- Production companies: Don Mischer Productions; Netflix Studios
- Distributed by: Netflix
- Release date: April 6, 2018
- Running time: 70 minutes
- Country: United States
- Language: English

Seth Rogen's Hilarity for Charity is a stand-up comedy special to raise awareness for Alzheimer's disease, that premiered on Netflix on April 6, 2018.

== Cast ==
- Seth Rogen
- Ike Barinholtz
- Michael Che
- Sacha Baron Cohen
- Jeff Goldblum
- Tiffany Haddish
- Chris Hardwick
- Nick Kroll
- Post Malone
- John Mulaney
- The Muppets
  - Matt Vogel as Kermit the Frog/Floyd Pepper/Camilla the Chicken
  - Eric Jacobson as Fozzie Bear/Sam Eagle/Animal
  - Dave Goelz as Gonzo/Waldorf
  - Peter Linz as Walter/Statler
- Kumail Nanjiani
- Chelsea Peretti
- Craig Robinson and The Nasty Delicious
- Lauren Miller Rogen
- Justin Roiland as Char
- Zach Hadel as Ity
- Sarah Silverman
- Michelle Wolf

== Production ==
The comedy special was filmed at the Hollywood Palladium on March 24, 2018.
