= YOLO (2020 TV series) =

Adult animated sitcom

- Title card for season 1
- Also known as: YOLO: Crystal Fantasy (season 1); YOLO: Silver Destiny (season 2); YOLO: Rainbow Trinity (season 3)
- Genre: Adult animation Animated sitcom Comedy; Surreal humour
- Created by: Michael Cusack
- Based on: YOLO by Michael Cusack
- Written by: Michael Cusack
- Directed by: Michael Cusack
- Voices of: Sarah Bishop; Todor Manojlovic; Michael Cusack
- Theme music composer: Brendan Caulfield
- Composers: Brendan Caulfield (seasons 1 and 3); Todor Manojlovic (season 2)
- Countries of origin: Australia; United States
- Original language: English
- No. of seasons: 3
- No. of episodes: 24

Production
- Executive producers: Michael Cusack; Greta Lee Jackson (season 1); Mike Cowap (seasons 2–3); Emma Fitzsimons; Keith Crofford (season 1); Ollie Green (season 2); Walter Newman (seasons 1–2); Kelly Crews (season 3); Cameron Tang (season 3); Jordan Askins (season 3)
- Producers: Mike Cowap (season 1); Ollie Green (season 1); Laura DiMaio (season 2); Paul Moran (season 3); Cody DeMatteis (season 3)
- Editor: Anthony George (season 3)
- Running time: 11 minutes 33 minutes (episode 16)
- Production companies: Princess Pictures; Cusack Creatures (seasons 2–3); Williams Street

Original release
- Network: Adult Swim (United States); Stan (Australia)
- Release: April 1, 2020 – April 28, 2025

YOLO is an adult animated sitcom created by Michael Cusack for Cartoon Network's nighttime programming block Adult Swim, and streaming in Australia on Stan as an exclusive. The series is loosely adapted from Cusack's web series of the same name.

The first season, entitled YOLO: Crystal Fantasy premiered on August 10, 2020; the pilot was aired on April 1, 2020 as a part of Adult Swim's annual April Fools' Day event alongside another project of Cusack's, Smiling Friends. A second season titled YOLO: Silver Destiny was slated to air on January 16, 2023 on Adult Swim but was delayed to January 23, 2023. On October 12, 2023, it was announced that the series was renewed for a third season titled YOLO: Rainbow Trinity which premiered on March 9, 2025. Michael Cusack confirmed that Rainbow Trinity is the final season.

== Synopsis ==
The series follows the adventures of friends Rachel and Sarah as they travel through Australia.

== Voice cast ==
=== Main ===
- Sarah Bishop as Sarah Doyle
- Todor Manojlovic as Rachel / additional voices
- Michael Cusack as Sarah Dale (two pilot episodes released on YouTube in 2012 and 2014) / Lucas the Magnificent / Peeleken / Sarah's parents / Gellivah / Sarah's daughter / Sarah's grandmother / additional voices

=== Guest ===
- Michelle Brasier as Miki
- Jarrad Wright as Pink Wizard
- Naomi Higgins as Maddison
- Greta Lee Jackson as Donna
- Flying Lotus as himself
- Sam Knight
- Emma Chamberlain as Sofia

== Episodes ==
=== Series overview ===
Season	Title	Episodes	Originally released	
Season	Title	Episodes	First released	Last released
1	Crystal Fantasy	8	August 10, 2020	August 31, 2020
2	Silver Destiny	8	January 23, 2023	March 6, 2023
3	Rainbow Trinity	8	March 10, 2025	April 28, 2025

=== Season 1: Crystal Fantasy (2020) ===
No. overall	No. in season	Title	Written by	Original release date	US viewers (millions)
1	1	"Maddison's Birthday Party"	Michael Cusack	August 10, 2020 (Note: This episode had an advanced stealth premiere on April 1, 2020 as part of Adult Swim’s annual April Fools' stunt.)	0.51
Rachel gets an invite to Maddison's birthday party, and brings along Sarah as her "plus-one." Rachel climbs a tower to get a selfie with Maddison, while Sarah is banished to the Plus-One Mines.
2	2	"The Dusty Truck 'n' Donut Muster"	Michael Cusack	August 10, 2020	0.45
Rachel and Sarah head to the "Dusty Truck 'n' Donut Muster" in Goondiwindi, but Rachel is unaware she's walking into a trap. Meanwhile, Sarah forgot to buy a ticket and follows a shaman around the area to get in.
3	3	"A Very Extremely Very Yolo Christmas: Reloaded"	Michael Cusack	August 17, 2020	0.48
Sarah and Rachel go on a Christmas cruise organised by Sarah's nan. Shortly after arriving, Sarah's nan self-destructs and the cruise ship is bitten in half by a large crocodile. After washing ashore at The Beach, Sarah and Rachel try to find the crocodile that sunk them for different reasons. Flying Lotus appears as himself in this episode.
4	4	"The Terry Cup"	Michelle Brasier & Michael Cusack	August 17, 2020	0.41
Sarah and Rachel go to the Terry Cup, a dance competition where dancers try to please a giant floating head named Terry. Rachel quickly gambles herself into 8 Million "Terry credits" of debt, while Sarah gets jealous at her ex-boyfriend's new fling: a garbage bin.
5	5	"Bush Doof"	Michael Cusack & Nina Oyama	August 24, 2020	0.44
Rachel steers Sarah's car off a cliff after hearing about the nearby Bush Doof. Soon, the party escalates into a war between two Bush Wizards.
6	6	"Planet Horoscope"	Michael Cusack, Greta Lee Jackson & Lena Moon	August 24, 2020	0.35
Sarah decides to take a solo vacation to Planet Bali, but falls through a wormhole and crash-lands on Planet Horoscope, where she meets her star-sign Capricorn. Meanwhile, Rachel tries to follow her in a rocket built and captained by Lucas.
7	7	"Enter Bushworld Part One"	Michael Cusack & Anca Vlasan	August 31, 2020	0.52
A drunken Rachel tries to pee on a crystal tree and falls into another dimension where a Ute Party is happening. Meanwhile, years pass on Earth as Sarah gives up Rachel for dead, gets married, and has a daughter.
8	8	"Enter Bushworld Part Two"	Michael Cusack & Anca Vlasan	August 31, 2020	0.47
Sarah becomes a widow after her husband’s death, but finds her new passion in pottery. Rachel continues wandering through the other dimension, looking for a party, and later has an epiphany after speaking with an elderly and frail Sarah while sinking in quicksand.

=== Season 2: Silver Destiny (2023) ===
No. overall	No. in season	Title	Written by	Original release date	US viewers (millions)
9	1	"Sausage Sizzle"	Michael Cusack & Anca Vlasan	January 23, 2023	0.17
After a wild night of partying, Sarah and Rachel stumble into a spiritual commune for a free sausage sizzle and encounter the Purple Fire God, who tells them their destiny.
10	2	"Planet Bali"	Michael Cusack, Anca Vlasan & Greta Lee Jackson	January 23, 2023	0.15
Sarah, Rachel and Lucas head to Planet Bali for Sarah's sister's wedding and are surprised to discover the identity of the groom; while waiting on the beach to guard Rachel's sword, Lucas encounters a mermaid who sets him on a new quest.
11	3	"High School Reunion"	Michael Cusack, Anca Vlasan & Greta Lee Jackson	January 30, 2023	0.19
Sarah throws a Wollongong High School reunion to show off her blossoming new garden, but the success of her old school mates only deepens her crisis of self-worth; Lucas must face a mysterious muscled bat boy to compete for Sarah's attention.
12	4	"Chaise in the City"	Michael Cusack, Anca Vlasan, Michelle Blasier & Jillian Bass	February 6, 2023	0.12
The girls watch an art house flick starring a hot young actor; this leads to a wild romantic dream for Sarah; Rachel is determined to sabotage Sarah's dream.
13	5	"Jamberoo"	Michael Cusack, Anca Vlasan & Nina Oyama	February 13, 2023	0.20
The gang travel 300 million years back in time using Lucas's time machine, where Sarah tries to rescue the Australian megafauna from a comet using skills she's learnt from a self-help guide; Rachel finds a special connection with a rugged Mega-Bilb.
14	6	"The Parents Episode"	Michael Cusack, Anca Vlasan, Michelle Braiser & Todor Manojlovic	February 20, 2023	N/A
On a quest for a tale of familial lore, Lucas seeks out the story of how Sarah's parents met; he hears a ripping yarn of fair maidens and reckless bravery set in Ye Olde Wollongong, where Dad needs to save Mum from an arranged marriage to a boulder.
15	7	"Journey to the Chasm of the Bees"	Michael Cusack, Anca Vlasan & Nina Oyama	February 27, 2023	0.18
Sarah is kidnapped by bees whilst tending to her flowering garden and taken to their honey castle, where she becomes their empress.
16	8	"This is LITERALLY the Finale"	Michael Cusack & Anca Vlasan	March 6, 2023	0.16
Sarah and Rachel set off in pursuit of their destinies as a gardener and a dark empress. Note: At 33 minutes long, this is the longest episode in the series.

=== Season 3: Rainbow Trinity (2025) ===
No. overall	No. in season	Title	Original release date	US viewers (millions)
17	1	"<3 ¸,Ø¤O°`°O¤Ø, ¸ ¸,Ø¤O°<3 Love Heart <3 Fun Times at the Festy Gong-Fest"	March 10, 2025	N/A
Sarah goes to her first music festival with Rachel, who is determined to go backstage and meet her favorite band, but their VIP experience gets cut short when Rachel goes to the bathroom.
18	2	"Winery Crawl Slip and Slide Ride (MMM YUMMY WINE LOL *KISSYS*)"	March 17, 2025	N/A
Sarah and Rachel spend some quality time with Sarah's parents at Winery Crawl World where Lucas tries to join them.
19	3	"hiiiii, watchu doinnn :) nm u?, thats gud, hahah, whatcya up tooooooo, nothing muuuuch, haha saame :) or FIGHT! Battle of Bubble Gum Park Rawrrr"	March 24, 2025	N/A
Sarah and Rachel celebrate Peeleken's "splirthday party" at Bubble Gum Park. Note: This episode was previewed at New York Comic Con on October 17, 2024.
20	4	"All Night Gaming 2"	March 31, 2025	N/A
Lucas brings Sarah and Rachel to an internet cafe, where he accidentally traps them in a simulation of his own making.
21	5	"SOMEONE COME BRING ME FOOD AND ENTERTAIN ME! (SNOW EP) (SPONSOR MONSTER EP)"	April 7, 2025	N/A
Sarah and Rachel go on a girls trip to a snowy cabin with Sarah's old bestie, Tricia, and two of her mates.
22	6	"Our Lovely Jubbly, Wovley, Bubbly, Zubbly, Lovely, Bubbly Wubbly Tasmania :P"	April 14, 2025	N/A
A day at the beach spirals into chaos when Sarah and Rachel are caught in a rip tide and wash up on the mysterious island of Tasmania.
23	7	"The Wollongong Santa Pub Crawl!!!!!!!!!!!!!!!!!!!!!!!!!!!!!!!!!!!!!!!! RAWR!!!"	April 21, 2025	N/A
Sarah and Rachel meet up with their friends at the annual Santa Pub Crawl in Wollongong. Rachel sets out to meet Santa so he can grant her one wish before Christmas is over.
24	8	"The Cozy Backyard Afternoon Musical"	April 28, 2025	N/A
While hosting a BBQ in the backyard, Sarah's Dad trips the electricity and causes a power outage. Sarah and Rachel embark on a perilous quest to turn the switchboard back on.

== Release ==
The series premiered on Adult Swim in the United States on August 10, 2020. It later was acquired by Australian streaming service Stan as a "Stan Exclusive". In the United Kingdom, the series premiered on E4 on September 10.
