= Chris O'Neill (animator) =

Irish YouTuber and animator (born 1990)

- Born: Christopher Luke O'Neill; 21 November 1990 (age 35); Wexford, Ireland
- Other names: OneyNG, Oney
- Occupations: Internet personality; animator; cartoonist; video game designer; musician; voice actor

YouTube information
- Channels: OneyNG; OneyPlays
- Years active: 2006–present
- Genres: Animation; comedy; gaming; music
- Subscribers: 2.51 million (OneyNG); 1.47 million (OneyPlays)
- Views: 506 million (OneyNG); 1.28 billion (OneyPlays)
- Last updated: 31 July 2026

Christopher Luke O'Neill (born 21 November 1990), also known by his pseudonym Oney (/ˈoʊni/) or OneyNG, is an Irish YouTuber, animator, cartoonist, video game designer, musician, and voice actor. He is known for his Flash animations and being the founder and host of the YouTube Let's Play web series OneyPlays. He is also the owner of the video game production company OneyWare.

== Early life and education ==
O'Neill is from Killinick in County Wexford, and attended St Peter's College. He later enrolled in Dún Laoghaire Institute of Art, Design and Technology, but dropped out after a year of study.

== Career ==
O'Neill began his online career on the American entertainment website Newgrounds, creating an account on March 28, 2006. He created a YouTube channel at age 17, and by 2013, it was ranked as Ireland's most successful YouTube channel with a total of 240 million views. The channel's content includes animated music videos, video game parodies, live-action sketches and original series such as Leo and Satan, Lets Dance, and Hellbenders, the latter of which was made with fellow Newgrounds animator Zach Hadel (psychicpebbles).

In 2014, O'Neill began posting Let's Play video content to the Oney's Video Hole channel, later renamed OneyPlays. The channel became prominent in 2017 for starting the Crash Bandicoot "Woah" Internet meme based on a common sound-effect from the PlayStation series. The meme was referenced in an easter egg in the 2020 video-game Crash Bandicoot 4: It's About Time. The channel features regular appearances from other personalities, such as Zach Hadel, Joshua Tomar, Lyle Rath, Cory Beck (Spazkid) and David Brown (PhantomArcade), after having featured Julian Marcel and the pseudonymous Ding Dong as co-hosts before they left the show in 2018. Guest appearances have included Matt Watson and Ryan Magee of SuperMega, as well as fellow Newgrounds alumni including Mick Lauer (Ricepirate), Jeff Bandelin (JohnnyUtah), and Harry Partridge.

YouTuber Jason Gastrow, known online as videogamedunkey, mentioned in a 2015 Reddit thread that O'Neill designed his YouTube channel profile picture. O'Neill would later make appearances on Gastrow's channel.

In 2019, O'Neill created the game studio OneyWare. A gameplay trailer for Bowlbo: The Quest for Bing Bing, an upcoming video game developed by OneyWare in collaboration with AlbinoMoose, was initially planned to release in March 2019, but as of 2026 has yet to be given a release date.

In 2020, O'Neill collaborated again with Hadel when he and animator Michael Cusack created the Adult Swim animated show Smiling Friends. O'Neill created the ending credit music for the pilot episode of the series as well as providing 3D modeling and animation. He later also voiced some minor background characters when Smiling Friends was picked up for a full season.

In 2023, alongside animation director Adam Paloian, O'Neill collaborated with Pinreel Inc. to create the music video for Tenacious D's "Video Games." The video has over 52 million views as of September 2026.

== Filmography ==
=== Television ===
Year	Title	Role	Notes
2020–2026	Smiling Friends	Various	Also animator, composer, and modeler

=== Web ===
Year	Title	Role	Notes
2008–present	Oney Cartoons	Various	Also animator and director
2009–2023	Eddsworld	Eduardo, Self, various	Voiced in "Climate Change," "Hammer & Fail," "Casting Call," and "Surf & Turf Wars" Also composer
2010–2011	Leo and Satan	Leo	Also animator, composer, co-writer, co-director, and co-creator. Spin-off of Oney Cartoons.
2012, 2015	Game Grumps	Self	
2012–2013	Ninja Sex Party	Party Victim ("Best Friends Forever!")	Music videos "Unicorn Wizard" (animation) and "Best Friends Forever!"
2012–2015	Hellbenders	Chris	Also co-writer, co-director, composer, and storyboard artist
2013	TOME: Terrain of Magical Expertise	Chroney	
2014–present	OneyPlays	Self	Host, former editor
2015–2019	JonTron	Self	Also co-writer, composer, and Special Thanks
2016	Smart Guys	Videya Gamez XXXpo 24 Goer	1 episode
2017	GrumpCade	Self	Guest, 2 episodes
2017	Doodle Doods	Self	Host
2017	My Two Lovely Uncles	Uncle Fungus	Also composer
2017	Wrath Club	Pleb Scout	Episode: "The Hipstist"
2018–present	Slightly Artistic	Self	Host
2018–2019	Ultimate Recap Cartoon	Intro Voice	3 episodes
2019	The Cyanide & Happiness Show	Announcer 2	
2025	The Amazing Digital Circus	Ming	2 episodes
2025	Homestuck: The Animated Pilot	Narrator	

=== Video games ===
Year	Title	Role
2021	Terrain of Magical Expertise	MaxSecRo, Com-Nder

=== Podcast ===
Year	Title	Role	Notes
2014–2019	SleepyCast	Self	Host
2016–2017	SuperMegaCast	Self	Guest, 4 episodes
2017	The Official Podcast	Self	Guest

=== Music videos ===
Year	Title	Role	Artist
2023	Video Games	Director, storyboard artist, character designer, environment and lighting artist, sound editor	Tenacious D
2024	Shipwrecked	Co-writer, composer	MIRRONEY
