= Shrek Retold =

2018 fan remake of the film Shrek

- The film's thumbnail on YouTube, featuring the titular character in various mediums
- Directed by: Grant Duffrin
- Based on: Shrek by DreamWorks; Shrek! by William Steig
- Produced by: Christopher Carlone; Nolan Cooney; Justin Silverman; Bryan Stickley; Lee Terwilliger
- Edited by: Grant Duffrin
- Music by: Fauxny: Kevin Gonring; Oditharge; Ryan Dorin; DJ Douggpound; Chris Carlone; Raymond Allen; Damon Scott; Helior Colorado; Esteban Proaño; Marc M; Urethra Heap; David Liebe Hart; Dumb Fidelity; Hot Dad; Grant Duffrin; T.O.S.O.; Mowtendoo; Morrano; Woongi; dead dungeon killa snake and slice of life; Pigeon; Joseph Le Roy; Res the 2nd; Christopher Carlone; Nick Hubler; Ben Strohbeen
- Production company: 3GI Industries
- Distributed by: 3GI Industries
- Release date: November 29, 2018
- Running time: 90 minutes
- Country: United States
- Language: English

Shrek Retold is a fan-made reanimated collab and remake film based on the 2001 film Shrek, in turn based on the 1990 children's book by William Steig. Released on November 29, 2018, to YouTube, the project was led by YouTuber Grant Duffrin ("3GI"), best known for hosting an annual Shrek festival in Milwaukee from 2014 to 2023. It features the work of over 200 creators, each contributing to a portion of the recreation.

== Premise ==
Shrek Retold follows the plot of the original film with only some deviations. The main difference between Shrek Retold and the original is in its reinterpretation; as a collaborative effort with over 200 contributors, the art style, voice acting, and music change from scene to scene, often being wildly different from the original. Unlike the original Shrek which is entirely 3D animated, Shrek Retold features 2D and 3D animation animation, live action, stop-motion and other mediums. The film's contributors include many on internet personalities and actors, such as David Liebe Hart, Michael Cusack, Anthony Fantano, Jamie Loftus, and SiIvaGunner.

== Production and release ==
I have no idea if it's possible to like something ironically. It's like, could you enjoy ice cream ironically? Could you eat ice cream as a joke?

— Grant Duffrin, interview with Quartz

Shrek Retold was produced as a collaborative, but segmented effort; director Grant Duffrin split the film into different scenes of varying length, and each scene was recreated by a contributor. In an interview with Quartz, Duffrin stated his love of Shrek was genuine, contrary to the "ironic" Shrek internet memes of the time. Shortly prior to release, a trailer for the film was uploaded to the 3GI channel which received significant news coverage. The film premiered on YouTube to a live audience on November 29, 2018, and has since remained on the site. On November 29, 2019, it was announced that the film would be available for purchase on a film poster, VHS and as a free digital download. A Blu-ray release was later announced on March 1, 2022.

== Soundtrack ==
Shrek Retold (Official Soundtrack)

Soundtrack album by Various Artists
- Released: November 29, 2018
- Label: Autumn Sounds

The soundtrack was released on streaming services and cassette for the film's first anniversary on November 29, 2019. It features covers of songs featured in the original Shrek's soundtrack and additional original songs written specifically for the project.

No.	Title	Length
1.	"Fauxny & Kevin Gonring – All Star"	04:18
2.	"Oditharge (feat. Ray Sipe) – Makin' Waffles"	01:40
3.	"Nolan Cooney – Pina Colada"	03:38
4.	"Ryan Dorin "Ratboy Genius" – Welcome to Duloc"	00:34
5.	"DJ Douggpound – Donkey Look Out"	03:03
6.	"Chris Carlone – I'm on My Way"	00:48
7.	"Larry Inc 64 – Some Moon"	01:30
8.	"Raymond Allen – Shed"	01:50
9.	"Dumb Fidelity & Roughy – Singing Princess"	01:34
10.	"Damon Scott 'Broken Pixels', Helior Colorado & Esteban Proano – Merry Men"	00:44
11.	"Marc M 'Sick Animation' – Shrek Love"	01:32
12.	"Urethra Heap – You Belong to Me"	01:58
13.	"Grant Duffrin – Eleven Months"	00:37
14.	"David Liebe Hart & Dumb Fidelity – Hallelujah"	02:18
15.	"Hot Dad – Believer"	04:45
16.	"Grant Duffrin – Stay Home"	05:17
17.	"TOSO – Best Years of Our Lives"	02:59
18.	"Mowtendoo – Like Wow"	01:52
19.	"Morrano – It Is You (I Have Loved)"	03:41
20.	"Grant Duffrin – Trailer Song"	02:24
Total length:		47:02

== Reception ==
Shrek Retold was received well by critics, who mainly praised its impressive scope for a fan film project and its bizarre content.

== Future ==
Originally, on April 1, 2019, 3GI posted an April Fools video titled Shrek 2 Retold in which the project director discussed the creation of Shrek Retold. During Shrekfest 2019, it was announced that Shrek 2 Retold was no longer just a joke and is actually happening via an animated announcement trailer. On April 22, 2021, as a celebration of the twentieth anniversary of the original film, 3GI posted an official teaser trailer of Shrek 2 Retold. The film premiered at the tenth Shrekfest via an in-person screening at the Oriental Theatre on September 3, 2023. A trailer was released on May 19, 2024, announcing the film will be released on September 28 of that year, as well as announcing a number of contributors, including Justin Long, Zach Hadel, Lucas Cruikshank, Tay Zonday, Justin and Travis McElroy, Jake and Amir, Joe Pera, Jaiden Animations, Richard Steven Horvitz, Matt Bennett, Noah Munck, Dax Flame, Kevin McDonald, jacksfilms, Tom Fulp, James Rolfe, LAKE, Steve Zaragoza, Shoenice, Mega64, Jerma985, Bill Wurtz, Phil Lord and Christopher Miller, and both posthumous appearances from Gilbert Gottfried and Will Cullen Hart. On September 20, 2024, the film was delayed indefinitely.As of January 29, 2026, the film is still in progress.

In March 2020, Shrek Retold was followed up by Sonic Rebuilt, a similar recreation of Sonic the Hedgehog: The Movie (1996). Unlike Shrek Retold, Sonic Rebuilt uses the soundtrack from its source OVA.

== See also ==
- Reanimated collaboration
