= 329 =

329 in various calendars
Gregorian calendar	329; CCCXXIX
Ab urbe condita	1082
Assyrian calendar	5079
Balinese saka calendar	250–251
Bengali calendar	−265 – −264
Berber calendar	1279
Buddhist calendar	873
Burmese calendar	−309
Byzantine calendar	5837–5838
Chinese calendar	戊子年 (Earth Rat); 3026 or 2819 — to — 己丑年 (Earth Ox); 3027 or 2820
Coptic calendar	45–46
Discordian calendar	1495
Ethiopian calendar	321–322
Hebrew calendar	4089–4090
- Hindu calendars
Vikram Samvat	385–386
Shaka Samvat	250–251
Kali Yuga	3429–3430
Holocene calendar	10329
Iranian calendar	293 BP – 292 BP
Islamic calendar	302 BH – 301 BH
Javanese calendar	210–211
Julian calendar	329; CCCXXIX
Korean calendar	2662
Minguo calendar	1583 before ROC 民前1583年
Nanakshahi calendar	−1139
Seleucid era	640/641 AG
Thai solar calendar	871–872
Tibetan calendar	ས་ཕོ་བྱི་བ་ལོ་ (male Earth-Rat); 455 or 74 or −698 — to — ས་མོ་གླང་ལོ་ (female Earth-Ox); 456 or 75 or −697

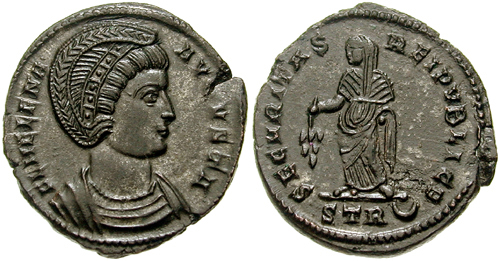
Flavia Iulia Helena Augusta

Year 329 (CCCXXIX) was a common year starting on Wednesday of the Julian calendar. At the time, it was known as the Year of the Consulship of Constantinus and Constantinus (or, less frequently, year 1082 Ab urbe condita). The denomination 329 for this year has been used since the early medieval period, when the Anno Domini calendar era became the prevalent method in Europe for naming years.

== Events ==
=== By place ===
==== China ====
- The Han-Zhao dynasty, a Southern Xiongnu state during the Sixteen Kingdoms, ends.

=== By topic ===
==== Religion ====
- Roman restrictions on joining the clergy are initiated.

== Births ==
- Gregory Nazianzus, Greek Patriarch of Constantinople (d. 390)

== Deaths ==
- Han Huang, Chinese general and rebel
- Liu Xi, Chinese emperor of Han-Zhao
- Liu Yao, Chinese emperor of Han-Zhao
- Liu Yin, Chinese prince of Han-Zhao
- Wen Jiao, Chinese general and governor
