= Koala Man =

Adult animated television series

- Genre: Animated sitcom; Superhero; Comedy; Black comedy; Surreal humor
- Created by: Michael Cusack
- Based on: Fresh Blood: Koala Man 2018 Pilot by Michael Cusack for ABC Comedy
- Developed by: Michael Cusack; Dan Hernandez; Benji Samit
- Voices of: Michael Cusack; Sarah Snook; Demi Lardner; Hugh Jackman; Jemaine Clement
- Composer: Brendan Caulfield
- Countries of origin: Australia; United States
- Original language: English
- No. of seasons: 1
- No. of episodes: 8

Production
- Executive producers: Michael Cusack; Dan Hernandez; Benji Samit; Justin Roiland; Scott Greenberg; Ben Jones; Joel Kuwahara; Dana Tafoya-Cameron; Mike Cowap; Emma Fitzsimons
- Producers: Dario Russo; David Ashby; Lucas Gardner; Laura Dimaio; Justin Wight
- Editor: Scott Henry
- Running time: 23–24 minutes
- Production companies: Cusack Creatures; Hermit House; Justin Roiland's Solo Vanity Card Productions!; Princess Pictures; Bento Box Entertainment; 20th Television Animation

Original release
- Network: Hulu (United States); Disney+ (Australia)
- Release: January 9, 2023

Related
- Damo and Darren (2014–2016)

Koala Man is a superhero animated sitcom created by Michael Cusack for Hulu. Developed by Cusack, Dan Hernandez, and Benji Samit, the series premiered on January 9, 2023, on Hulu in the United States and on Disney+ in Australia. The series pilot aired on ABC in 2018.

The series is set in an alternate universe where the United States has been destroyed, and Australia is the world's last surviving superpower. A middle-aged family man serves as the resident superhero of Dapto while having no superhuman abilities and devoting minimal effort to hide his secret identity.

== Plot ==
The series takes place in an alternate universe called "Bushworld", where the sinking of the Titanic never happened, indirectly resulting in the United States being destroyed (except Hollywood, which became an island), Australia becoming the world's superpower, and Nicole Kidman becoming its Queen.

The story follows Kevin Williams, an average middle-aged family man who decides to serve justice to the town of Dapto as the incredibly average superhero Koala Man. Possessing no powers and a simple costume, which is apparently enough to hide his secret identity, Kevin encounters various evildoers who wish to do harm to his town.

Kevin is joined by his family, who put up with his misadventures, including his down-to-earth wife, Vicky, and his 14-year-old twin children, a popularity-obsessed daughter, Alison, and a nerdy son, Liam, who secretly possesses psychic powers.

== Cast ==
=== Main ===
- Michael Cusack as Kevin Williams/Koala Man, a father and IT expert who moonlights as a low-rent superhero
  - Cusack also voices:
    - Liam Williams, Kevin's son, who possesses psychic powers
    - Damo and Darren, a pair of low-level criminals
    - The Tall Poppy
    - The Great One
    - Nicole Kidman, the Queen of Australia
    - Huge Greg, Big Greg's older brother
    - Additional Voices
- Sarah Snook as Vicky Williams, Kevin's wife, who works at the school canteen
- Demi Lardner as Alison Williams, Kevin's daughter
- Hugh Jackman as Big Greg, a beloved celebrity fishing expert and the head of the town council, who is Kevin's boss
- Jemaine Clement as Principal Bazwell/Christopher/The Kookaburra, the ineffectual principal of North Dapto High who is Vicky's boss and reveals himself to be a supervillain.

=== Guest ===
- Alexandra Daddario as Herself
- Rachel House as Janine, Vicky's friend and co-worker at the school canteen
  - House also voices Louise, the owner of the local bowling club, who harbors an attraction to Koala Man
- Angus Sampson as General Peckmeister, Wizened Garbage Man, Summer Santa, and many more.
- Jordan Shanks as the Town Shopkeeper, Chippy, Snuff film victim
- Hugo Weaving as King Emudeus
- Justin Roiland as Chad Wagon, an American who wants to turn Australia into a second United States
- Jarrad Wright as Spider, Kevin's boorish next-door neighbor
  - Wright also voices:
    - Maxwell, a wheelchair-using septuagenarian with a long, complicated history
    - Maxwell's father
    - Additional Voices
- Michelle Brasier as McKayla Taylor Mercedes, a popular girl who speaks with a vocal fry, and Alison's initial nemesis
  - Brasier also voices Tanya, a fish who is Huge Greg's wife
- Miranda Otto as Mindy, a koala that Kevin found and cared for before she died after being hit by a car, before the events of the series.
- Claudia O'Doherty as Rosie Yodels/Rosie 2, the most popular girl in school
  - O'Doherty also voices:
    - Rosie 1 and Rosie 3, Rosie's sister clones, who want to take over Australia
    - Additional Voices
- Natalie Tran as Lulu Liu, Neighbour
- Nisrine Amine as The Egyptian Mummy, a survivor of the Titanic who became the US president and fled to the Moon
- Anthony Salame, Jordan Shanks, and Steph Tisdell as The Tradies, corrupt tradespeople who secretly run every aspect of Dapto and possess supernatural abilities.
- Michelle Brasier, Leigh Joel Scott, Anthony Salame, and Ian Zaro as The Tigglies, villainous parodies of the Wiggles who kill their victims, who are children, by draining them of their youth.
- Liam McIntyre as Emus
- Nazeem Hussain as Clarko
- Nina Oyama as Little Nina

== Episodes ==
No.	Title	Directed by	Written by	Original release date	Prod. code
1	"Bin Day"	Roberto Fino	Michael Cusack	January 9, 2023	1HLX01
Kevin Williams is Koala Man, Dapto's resident superhero. Despite his good intentions, nobody likes him and considers him a nuisance. Inspired by his boss, Big Greg, Kevin decides to write a theme song for himself, but he supposedly forgets to take the bins out, causing the entire neighbourhood to forget to put out their trash. Because of this, his house gets dumped with garbage. Meanwhile, Kevin's wife, Vicky, becomes obsessed with fixing things around the house, including the garbage, while his daughter, Alison, tries to make a slutty photo to get popular. The garbage is devoured by a being called the Tall Poppy, who escapes its pit and proceeds to eat all the garbage in Dapto, which includes the people. Kevin battles Tall Poppy with the help of Vicky and their son Liam and rescues the Daptonians. Everyone is about to kill him, but Kevin empathizes with Tall Poppy, and they send him away to Hollywood. Kevin and Vicky finally have a date night, and it is revealed that Kevin did take the bins out, but a villain named the Kookaburra put them back as revenge.
2	"Deep Pockets"	Andrew Bowler	Dan Hernandez & Benji Samit	January 9, 2023	1HLX02
Kevin creates a Koala-Hotline with mixed results. Big Greg promises to give him a license if he solves a big case. Vicky institutes a soda ban at the school, causing all the kids to hate Alison and Liam, who start an underground soda ring. Vicky and Kevin, in his Koala Man attire, try to find the culprits, but Vicky becomes frustrated and tells Kevin that he is not a real superhero. Janine sets up Alison and Liam with her connections, and they meet the corrupt Tradies, who had earlier given Kevin a hard time. Liam begins to regret his actions and calls Kevin for help while Vicky discovers his connection. At the trade-off, a fight breaks out with the Tradies, who capture Kevin and Vicky and knock out Liam. Kevin manages to beat the Tradies, but they form into one being. Vicky feeds them soda, causing them to explode. Liam uses his hidden psychic powers to direct Alison to save them, and she blames the soda incident on her nemesis, McKayla, while Big Greg lifts the soda ban and spurns Kevin. Vicky apologises to Kevin by getting him a licence.
3	"The Red Hot Rule"	Maik Hempel	Nina Oyama	January 9, 2023	1HLX03
The elderly Maxwell recalls how, due to Australia's five-minute time zone difference, he prevented the Titanic from sinking. This resulted in America electing a Mummy as its president, who leaves for the Moon with her lover, turning America into a lawless wasteland, except for Hollywood, which broke off and became a civil island. American Chad Wagon opens a restaurant in Dapto and influences Liam to be like him, much to Kevin's chagrin. Chad actually wants to use Liam to murder Queen Nicole Kidman and transform Australia into America 2.0. Alison intends to win the Miss Sausage Roll Pageant. Vicky decides to train her to get revenge on her rival, Saucy, and her daughter, Saucy Jr. With Kidman at the pageant, Chad puts his plan into action, but Maxwell uses the time zone difference to warn Kevin. At the same time, Alison has Saucy Jr. killed, forfeiting the pageant crown. Kevin defeats Chad using freedom of speech, which shrinks him, and he gets crushed by a bus. President Mummy returns from the Moon and scoops up Chad's remains, vowing revenge.
4	"The Great One"	Roberto Fino	Georgie Aldago	January 9, 2023	1HLX04
At the Dapto Fair, Janine gets an alien rock stuck in her while masturbating and becomes possessed. She begins infecting everyone with shoulder massages, turning them into zombies. Vicky feels ignored by Kevin, who thinks that she, too, is possessed and hides with the survivors, including Big Greg and Louise. Meanwhile, Alison wants to be liked by the popular girl by giving her a showbag until she learns that it is forbidden. With Liam's psychic help, they locate James Showbag, a brain in a jar, who tells them where it is hidden before Alison mercy kills him. The showbag takes over Alison's sanity, and Liam is forced to get rid of it to save her. All of Dapto builds a rocket to, presumably, travel to space. With Kevin and Vicky, the only two not possessed, due to smelling of shellfish, they realize that the rocket is actually a giant dildo that The Great One, a tentacle creature, is soothing. They blow up the dildo, and The Great One leaves after realising that all of Dapto have kids. The entire town cleans the mess.
5	"Ode to a Koala Bear"	Andrew Bowler	Lucas Gardner	January 9, 2023	1HLX05
In a flashback throughout the episode, Kevin rescues a koala and names her Mindy. To feed her properly, Vicky makes a koala mask for Kevin to appeal to her. Having had a toughened upbringing due to his detective father, who was framed for a crime, Kevin opts to let Mindy back in the wild, only for her to get hit by a car. In the present, Liam and Alison are sent to music camp. Vicky is about to talk to Kevin about Koala Man, but he notices that Liam left his jacket and drives off to deliver it to him, only to get mugged and carjacked by kangaroos. He finds the studio of The Tinglies (a parody of The Wiggles), who are revealed to feed off the youth they entertain. Spider rescues Kevin, and they chase them to the music camp, where The Tinglies kidnap Liam and the talented Little Nina. Nina is killed, but Kevin and Spider manage to kill The Tinglies. Kevin tells Liam it is okay if he needs help from him sporadically, and Vicky and Big Greg arrive to drive them home, with the former not interested in discussing Koala Man for now.
6	"The Handies"	Maik Hempel	Dario Russo & David Ashby	January 9, 2023	1HLX06
At the Annual Handball Tournament, Dapto's promising team is suddenly incinerated. Big Greg is humiliated by his older brother, Huge Greg, who coaches the Sydney team, and Kevin steps in to recruit the replacement Dapto team, which turns out to be Alison and Liam. Despite Kevin's best efforts, Alison refuses to listen to her father. Big Greg offers her a mysterious manimal ooze that turns her into a dingo and makes Dapto win several games. Meanwhile, Vicky learns that Dapto is cursed after a pair of sunglasses is destroyed and travels to Mt. Kiera to get a new pair from the Gods. She meets the God of Seeing Your Potential, who encourages her, and she collects a box of new shades. Big Greg reveals to Kevin that the games have always been fixed, but Huge Greg decides not to rat them out, having transformed his team. Kevin turns Alison back to normal, and together with the shades Vicky brought, Dapto finally wins the Handies Tournament. Alison refuses to admit she loves her father as The Kookaburra secures a vial of the ooze for himself.
7	"Emu War II"	Roberto Fino	Anca Vlasan	January 9, 2023	1HLX07
Someone cracked the royal emu egg as Liam suddenly began to spout prophecy, but only when he was playing the piano. Maxwell informs Kevin that the emus are planning to attack Dapto in revenge. True to his word, the emus attack as some of the townsfolk hide. Vicky reveals to Kevin that she broke the emu egg, and Kevin heads out to speak with the emus. To power Liam's piano to prophesy, the survivors send Alison and popular girl Rosie Yodels to find the generator. Alison gets over wanting to be popular and becomes friends with Rosie as they successfully restore power to Dapto. Kevin is taken to King Emudeus and tries to reason with him, only for Dapto to arrive. As the fight rages on, Vicky is about to reveal herself as the culprit, but Kevin takes the blame, resulting in his being banished. He is suddenly kidnapped by the Kookaburra, who takes him to Tooth Brush Island and reveals that he was behind all the recent misfortune, including the death of Mindy, to kick out Kevin and become Dapto's new hero.
8	"Hot Christmas"	Andrew Bowler	Michael Cusack	January 9, 2023	1HLX08
One month later, Kevin is still stuck on Tooth Brush Island, Vicky is tending to an unconscious Liam, and Alison is now dating Rosie. She plans to run away to Hollywood Island with her, and The Kookaburra has become Dapto's new superhero. A bushfire suddenly starts, and the Kookaburra loses support due to his incompetence. Alison goes to save Rosie, only to learn that she is one of three Rosies who plan to take over Australia. Alison's Rosie sacrifices herself to save her, causing all Rosies to die. The Kookaburra is revealed to be Principal Bazwell, who kidnaps Vicky and Liam. Kevin sees Mindy's vision and returns as Koala Man to rescue his family, discovering that Bazwell is his childhood friend Christopher, who has plotted his revenge after a childhood urination incident. Using the ooze, he transforms himself, but Kevin talks him down and uses the urine he's been holding back to put out the fires. The Kookaburra, now reformed, leaves town to become the hero of Albion Park, and Dapto finally lauds Koala Man as a real hero. A now-powerless Liam wakes up, and Alison suggests he move to Hollywood Island as she becomes the most popular girl. Vicky accepts Kevin's double life as Koala Man, and he supports her run for Dapto's council. In a post-credits scene, Kevin gets a call from The Uncommonwealth to join their team, but he hangs up on them, thinking they are telemarketers.

== Production ==
In March 2021, Hulu announced that it had given a series order for the show. Michael Cusack, who is the creator, voices the titular character, with Hugh Jackman, Sarah Snook, and Demi Lardner joining the voice cast. In October 2022, Jemaine Clement, Rachel House, and Jarrad Wright joined the cast, with Miranda Otto and Hugo Weaving announced to be making guest appearances.

On January 25, 2023, Justin Roiland was removed from the show, alongside sister show Solar Opposites, after he was charged with felony domestic abuse. Both shows are produced by 20th Television Animation. Ben Jones, creator of The Problem Solverz, Stone Quackers, and Saturday Morning All Star Hits!, also helped executive produce this show.

== Release ==
The series premiered on January 9, 2023, on Hulu in the United States, in Australia, and in other international territories on Disney+ via Star Hub and Latin America on Star+. It became later avalible to stream for free on ABC Iview in Australia in February 2026.

== Reception ==
The series received generally positive reviews from critics. On Rotten Tomatoes, it holds an approval rating of 87% based on reviews from 15 critics, with an average rating of 6.9/10. The website's critical consensus states, "While Koala Man can feel like a hodgepodge of quirky ideas, its distinctive Australian identity gives it a pungent personality."

== See also ==
- List of Australian television series
