= Zach Hadel =

American animator and YouTuber (born 1993)

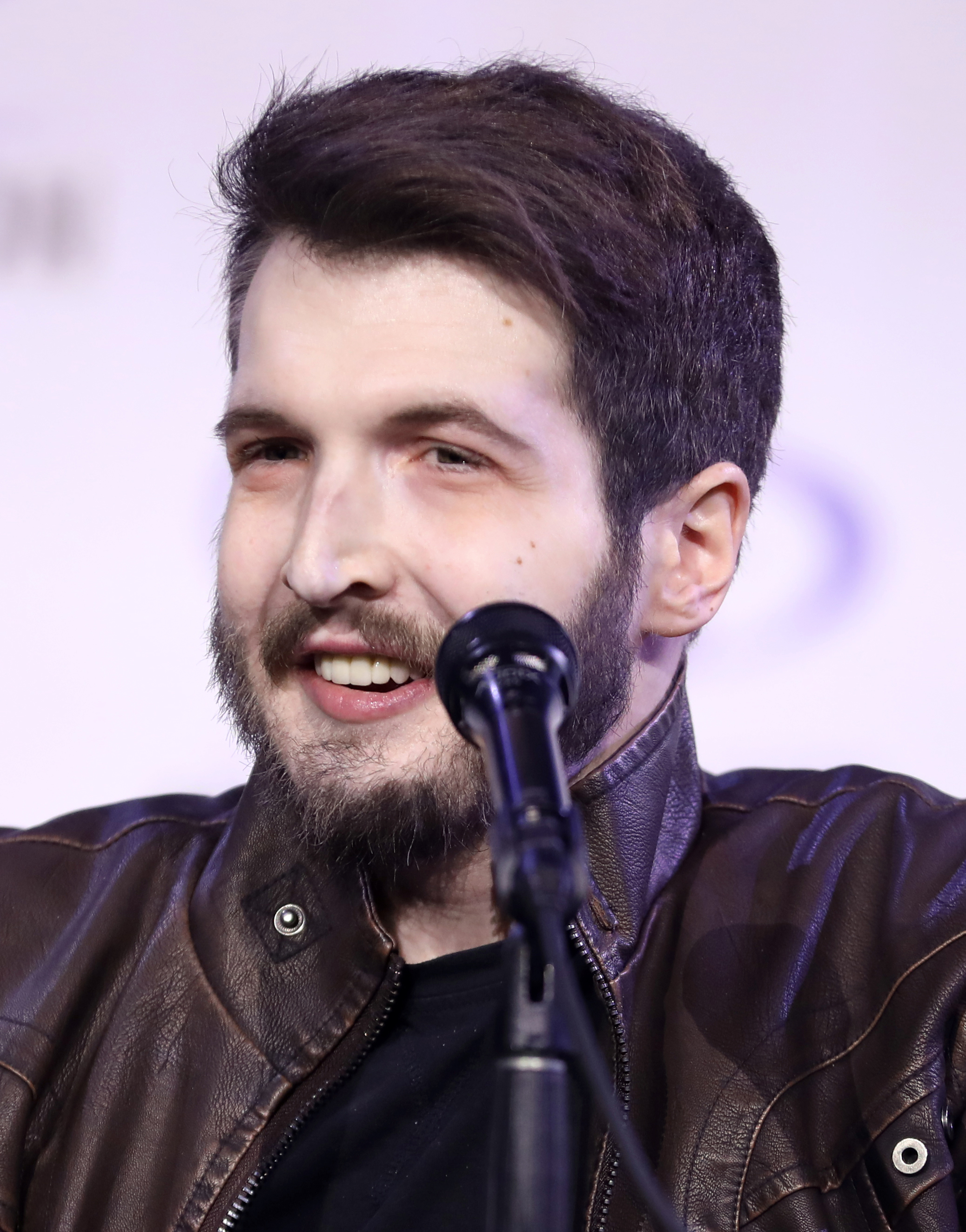
- Hadel in 2024
- Born: 1993 (age 32–33); Kansas, U.S.
- Other name: psychicpebbles
- Occupations: YouTuber; animator; writer; director; voice actor
- Partner: Nikki Cash (2015–present)

X information
- Handles: @psychicpebble

YouTube information
- Channels: thepsychicpebble (2008–2011) (Note: In 2016, Hadel confessed on SleepyCast to accidentally deleting his original account through his email.); psychicpebbles (2011–present)
- Years active: 2008–present
- Genres: Animation; comedy
- Subscribers: 1.67 million
- Views: 231 million
- Last updated: March 2, 2026

Zach Hadel (/ˈheɪdəl/ HAY-dəl; born 1993), known by his pseudonym psychicpebbles, is an American YouTuber, animator, writer, director, and voice actor. He and Michael Cusack are the co-creators and co-stars of the Adult Swim animated series Smiling Friends (2020–2026). He is also known for his Internet animations, for co-founding the independent animation studio ZAM Studios, and for being a co-host of OneyPlays, a Let's Play web series created by Chris O'Neill.

== Early life ==
Hadel was born in Kansas where he began his animation career by uploading Adobe Flash animations to Newgrounds, later transitioning to YouTube. He enrolled in college to learn graphic design, but immediately dropped out before attending any classes. A self-taught animator, Hadel has stated that shows such as SpongeBob SquarePants, The Simpsons, Dragon Ball Z, Beavis and Butt-Head, South Park, and Futurama, inspired his own animation style.

== Career ==
His short-form independent cartoons became popular online, such as his animated video responding to overuse of the "arrow in the knee" meme from The Elder Scrolls V: Skyrim which went viral in 2011. Along with fellow Newgrounds animator Chris O'Neill, Hadel created the popular web cartoon series Hellbenders featuring exaggerated versions of O'Neill and himself, which was picked up for a pilot by Adult Swim but ultimately not pursued after several years in development hell. Hadel also collaborated with O'Neill to make a short animated video parodying the Kony 2012 documentary; the video went viral, receiving over 1.7 million views within its first weekend. Hadel was a member of the YouTube group SleepyCabin and co-hosted SleepyCast, a comedy and discussion podcast hosted by former Newgrounds animators that launched on August 30, 2014. As of April 2024, his YouTube channel psychicpebbles has 1.6 million subscribers and 222.28 million views.

Hadel animated a segment of Seth Rogen's Hilarity for Charity with Justin Roiland, co-creator of Rick and Morty. Roiland later appraised the animation as his most transgressive joke. Hadel and Roiland also appeared alongside animator Alex Hirsch on h3h3's livestream podcast for charity where they raised over $100,000 for California wildlife relief.

Hadel hosted the podcast Schmucks from 2017 to 2019, where he interviewed fellow entertainers such as Michael Stevens, Finn Wolfhard, Jon Jafari, and Ethan Klein.

In 2018, Hadel storyboarded for SpongeBob SquarePants for the season 11 episode "The Grill is Gone".

=== Smiling Friends ===
On April 1, 2020, Cartoon Network's late-night Adult Swim block premiered the pilot episode of Hadel and Australian animator Michael Cusack's animated adult television series, Smiling Friends. The series follows Pim and Charlie, two employees of the titular nonprofit organization missioned with making people smile. The series premiered with a full season marathon on January 9, 2022, and later debuted on HBO Max. Adult Swim announced that the show would be renewed for a second season on February 9, 2022. Adult Swim renewed the show for a third season on June 13, 2024. Despite the show being renewed for two more seasons, Cusack and Hadel confirmed the third season would be the final one in the series, citing burnout and emphasis on quality over quantity.

== Filmography ==
=== Television ===
Year	Title	Role	Notes
2011	The One Show		Animator, features TomSka (Season 6, Episode 211, segment "OH NO BEARS")
2018	Seth Rogen's Hilarity for Charity	Ity	Also animator
2018	SpongeBob SquarePants		Storyboard artist ("The Grill is Gone")
2022–2026	Smiling Friends	Charlie, Glep, various	Also co-creator, director, writer, storyboard artist, storyboard revisionist, art director, character design supervisor, designer, and animator
2022	Tig n' Seek	Darryl Barryl	Episode: "Twin Seeks"
2022	The Paloni Show! Halloween Special!	Reggie Paloni	Co-writer
2023	Helluva Boss	Additional voices	Episode: "Mammon's Magnificent Musical Mid-Season Special"
2025	Big City Greens	Concerned Gym Bro	Episode: "Flexed"
2025	Hazbin Hotel	Zack Rabbit, Scream Rain	Episode: "Scream Rain"
2026	Robot Chicken	Charlie, Clay Puppington, Saul Malone	Television special, "Robot Chicken Adult Swim 25th Anniversary Special"

=== Web ===
Year	Title	Role	Notes
2010; 2012	TomSka		Animator on "Snowballs" and "Rock Bottom"
2011–2017	PsychicPebbles	Various	Various shorts
2012–2015	Hellbenders	Zach, various	Co-creator, co-director, co-writer
2013	TOME: Terrain of Magical Expertise	Zunchdial	Voice role
2013	OneyNG		Work on "Potato Salad"
2014–2016	Wrath Club	The Tumblist, The Trumby	Voice role, 2 episodes
2014–present	OneyPlays	Self	Guest, co-host
2014–2019	JonTron	Grimbo, World's Strongest Gamer, Indy Wife, Yoda (voice)	Animator, writer, voice role (4 episodes)
2016	Eddsworld		Additional art
2017	Hellsing Ultimate Abridged	Satan	Voice role
2019	The Ultimate Recap Cartoon	Momo	Voice role, episode: "The Ultimate ''Avatar: The Last Airbender'' Recap Cartoon"
2019	Satina	Melvin	Voice role, episode: "Bring Your Demon to Work Day"
2019	The Cyanide & Happiness Show	Tiny Gene	Episode: "The Animator's Curse"
2020	MeatCanyon	Humpty Dumpty	Voice role, episode: "Humpty Dumpty Had a Great Fall"
2020	Huggbees	Sandwich Factory Employee	Voice role, episode: "How It's Actually Made - Pre-Packaged Sandwiches"
2021	The Stockholms	Willy	Voice role; 2 episodes
2021	SMILING FRIENDS: Free Draw	Self	Special featured on Adult Swim YouTube channel.
2022	Monkey Wrench	Screamo	Episode: "The Ghost Egg"
2022	Brain Dump	Secretary	Episode: "What Is Fash Ism?"
2024	Spooky Month	Literally Zach	Episode: "Hollow Sorrows", misspelled as "Zach Hadle"
2024	Catching Up	Mad Bouncer	Episode: "Clubbing"
2025	Space King	Rudolph	Episode: "Kingsmas"
2025–2026	The Amazing Digital Circus	Orange Crappy Looking Fish	Episodes: "Beach Episode", "The Last Act"
2026	Gnome Show	City contractor	Episode: "Pilot"
TBA	Shrek 2 Retold	Shrek	Voice role

=== Podcast ===
Year	Title	Role	Notes
2014–2019	SleepyCast	Self	Host
2017–2019	Schmucks	Self	Host, 4 episodes
2017–2021	The Official Podcast	Self	Guest, 2 episodes
2018	H3 Podcast	Self, Logan Paul Fan, Donald Trump	Guest
2019–present	The Create Unknown	Self	Guest

=== Music videos ===
Year	Title	Role	Artist
2012	Unicorn Wizard	Animator	Ninja Sex Party
2013	Best Friends Forever	Animator	Ninja Sex Party

=== Video games ===
Year	Title	Role	Notes
2022	High on Life	Various	Voice
2026	Mewgenics	Cats	
2026	HIROTONFA's American Revolution Smuggler	Helmsman Harry	

Sourced from Hadel's IMDb page and YouTube channel.

== Awards and nominations ==
Year	Award	Category	Nominee(s)	Result	Ref.
2026	Annie Awards	Best Voice Acting – TV/Media	Zach Hadel	Nominated	
