= Michael Cusack (animator) =

Australian animator and voice actor (born 1990)

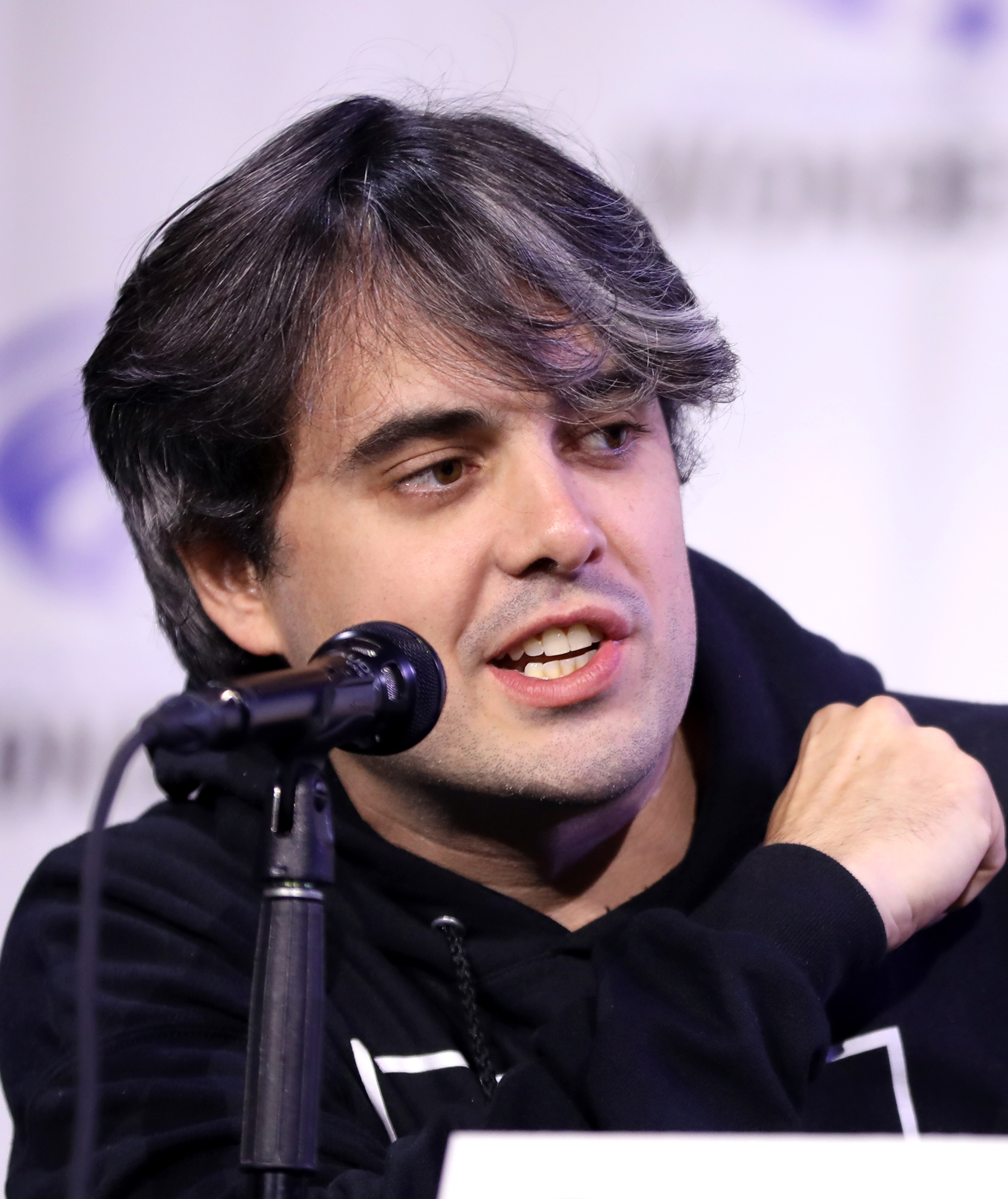
- Cusack in 2024
- Born: 25 October 1990 (age 35); Dapto, New South Wales, Australia
- Occupations: Animator; filmmaker; musician; voice actor
- Years active: 2012–present

Michael R. Cusack (born 25 October 1990) is an Australian animator, filmmaker, musician, and voice actor. He is known as the co-creator and co-star of the Adult Swim animated series Smiling Friends (2020–2026), as well as the voices of the characters Pim, Allan, and various others. He is also the creator of the Adult Swim animated series YOLO (2020–25) and the Hulu animated sitcom Koala Man (2023).

== Early life ==
Cusack was born on 25 October 1990, and raised in Dapto, New South Wales, and later moved to Melbourne.

== Career ==
Cusack became interested in animation in his 20s and taught himself Adobe Flash using online tutorials. He uploaded his content to his YouTube channel and Newgrounds account. He created and portrayed Lucas the Magnificent, a parody of New Atheist "neckbeards", in live-action YouTube videos and on Twitter, beginning in 2014; he later stated that the character led to him meeting and befriending American animator Zach Hadel, as Lucas the Magnificent stated that he wanted Hadel to animate the intro of Lucas' potential Let's Play show. They began to collaborate online, then later in person when Cusack traveled to meet Hadel in Burbank, California.

Cusack wrote, directed, animated, produced, and starred in the Rick and Morty special episode Bushworld Adventures, a parody of the series that aired on Adult Swim in 2018 as part of the network's April Fools' Day tradition. The success of Bushworld Adventures led him to create YOLO and Smiling Friends for the network, the latter alongside Hadel. He also voiced Knifey in the video game High on Life and its sequel, Nugget in the television film The Paloni Show Halloween Special, and Mammon in the online series Helluva Boss.

== Personal life ==
Cusack continues to reside in Melbourne although he regularly divides his time between Melbourne and Los Angeles, California, U.S.

== Filmography ==
=== Film ===
Year	Title	Role	Notes
2026	Smell The Flowers		Short film; writer, director, producer, cinematographer, editor

=== Television ===
Year	Title	Role	Notes
2018	Rick and Morty	Rick Sanchez, Morty Smith, Various	Episode: Bushworld Adventures Writer, director, producer, animator, compositor
2018	Fresh Blood	Koala Man, Damo, Darren, various	Episode: Koala Man Writer, director
2020–2025	YOLO	Lucas the Magnificent, various	Creator, director, writer, executive producer, animator, storyboard artist
2022–2026	Smiling Friends	Pim, Allan, various	Co-creator, director, writer, storyboard artist, storyboard revisionist, art director, character design supervisor, designer, animator
2023	Koala Man	Koala Man, Liam, Damo, Darren, various	Creator, co-developer, writer, executive producer
2024	Lego Star Wars: Rebuild the Galaxy	Servo	Mini-series
2025	Big City Greens	Jim Owner	Episode: "Flexed"
2025	Kiff	Old Crumb	Episode: "Ye Olde Candy Shoppe of Horrors"
2026	Toon World Express		Episode: "Nearly Departed" Writer, director
2026	Robot Chicken	Pim	Episode: "Robot Chicken Adult Swim Special"
TBA	Dad's House		Co-creator, executive producer

=== Video games ===
Year	Title	Role	Notes
2022	High on Life	Knifey	Voice
2026	High on Life 2	Knifey	Voice

=== Web ===
Year	Title	Role	Notes
2012	Question for Ted	Various	2 episodes
2012	YOLO	Sarah	Short
2013–2015	Weedheads	Various	2 episodes
2014–2025	Damo and Darren	Damo, Darren, various	7 episodes
2014	YOLO 2	Sarah and Some Crazy Happy Woman	Short
2018	OneyPlays	Himself	1 episode
2018	Shrek Retold	Donkey	Animator
2019	The Cyanide & Happiness Show	Aladdin	1 episode
2021	Smiling Friends: Free Draw	Self	Adult Swim special
2020–2022	The Official Podcast	Self	Podcast, Guest
2022	The Create Unknown	Self	2 episodes
2023–2024	Helluva Boss	Mammon	2 episodes
2025–present	Crocodile and Cube: In The Studio	Crocodile	Also creator, writer, director
2026	Gameoverse	Snappers	Pilot episode
