= E3 2019 =

25th annual Electronic Entertainment Expo

Electronic Entertainment Expo 2019
- Genre: Video game industry
- Begins: June 11, 2019
- Ends: June 13, 2019
- Venue: Los Angeles Convention Center
- Locations: Los Angeles, California
- Country: United States
- Previous event: E3 2018
- Next event: E3 2020 (cancelled); E3 2021
- Attendance: 66,100
- Organizer: Entertainment Software Association
- Filing status: Non-profit

The Electronic Entertainment Expo 2019 (E3 2019) was the 25th E3, during which hardware manufacturers, software developers, and publishers from the video game industry presented new and upcoming products to the attendees, primarily retailers and members of the video game press. The event, organized by the Entertainment Software Association (ESA), took place at the Los Angeles Convention Center from June 11–13, 2019. Many companies held its press conferences in the days prior, with the exception of Sony, which skipped the event for the first time.

No new gaming hardware was revealed, though Microsoft announced it was starting work on the next-generation Xbox, whereas Sony had discussed its own preparatory work for the next PlayStation consoles, both which were released in 2020. Most announcements at E3 were focused on new games, many set to release from late 2019 through early 2020. A strong emphasis was made on subscription services, such as Xbox Game Pass and Uplay Plus, as well as streaming services such as Stadia.

Due to the COVID-19 pandemic's effects on the industry, this was the last E3 show to have physically taken place as well as the last show held at the Los Angeles Convention Center.

== Format and changes ==
E3 2019 ran from June 11–13, 2019 in the Los Angeles Convention Center. In the days prior, major publishers held press conferences, typically as a live presentation in a large theater with streaming broadcast, or through streaming pre-recorded segments, highlighting the new games that are planned for the next year. During the show proper, developers and publishers ran exhibition booths that allowed industry members, the press, retail representatives, and the public to try out the new games and talk with the creators. Several side events were held in nearby venues, including video game tournaments.

As with E3 2017 and E3 2018, the ESA offered up to 15,000 public-access badges to the event.

The ESA's prior contract with the Los Angeles Convention Center had expired with E3 2019, and the ESA has stated they may be looking to other venues for E3 2020 and beyond. ESA has asked the Convention Center and city for additional space nearby, and while there are plans to open up more by 2020, the ESA remained unsure if this will be sufficient for the next show. The ESA eventually renegotiated with the Convention Center through 2023, though have left the option to break their contract if desired. The next event would be cancelled due to the COVID-19 pandemic. This is the most recent event to be held in-person.

Sony Interactive Entertainment announced that they would not be attending E3 2019, after having been a presence in all shows since the show's inception. Sony's CEO Shawn Layden stated in a February 2019 interview that with changes in retailer procurement, their own switch to fewer but more quality titles, and the rapid spread of news via the Internet that having a trade show as late as June was no longer helpful, and that Sony had to create its own Destination PlayStation experience in February as to secure retailer sales. Both Microsoft and Nintendo stated they would still attend E3. Possibly due to the lack of Sony's presence, the show drew about 3,100 fewer attendees from E3 2018, for a total attendance of 66,100.

== Press conferences ==
=== Microsoft ===
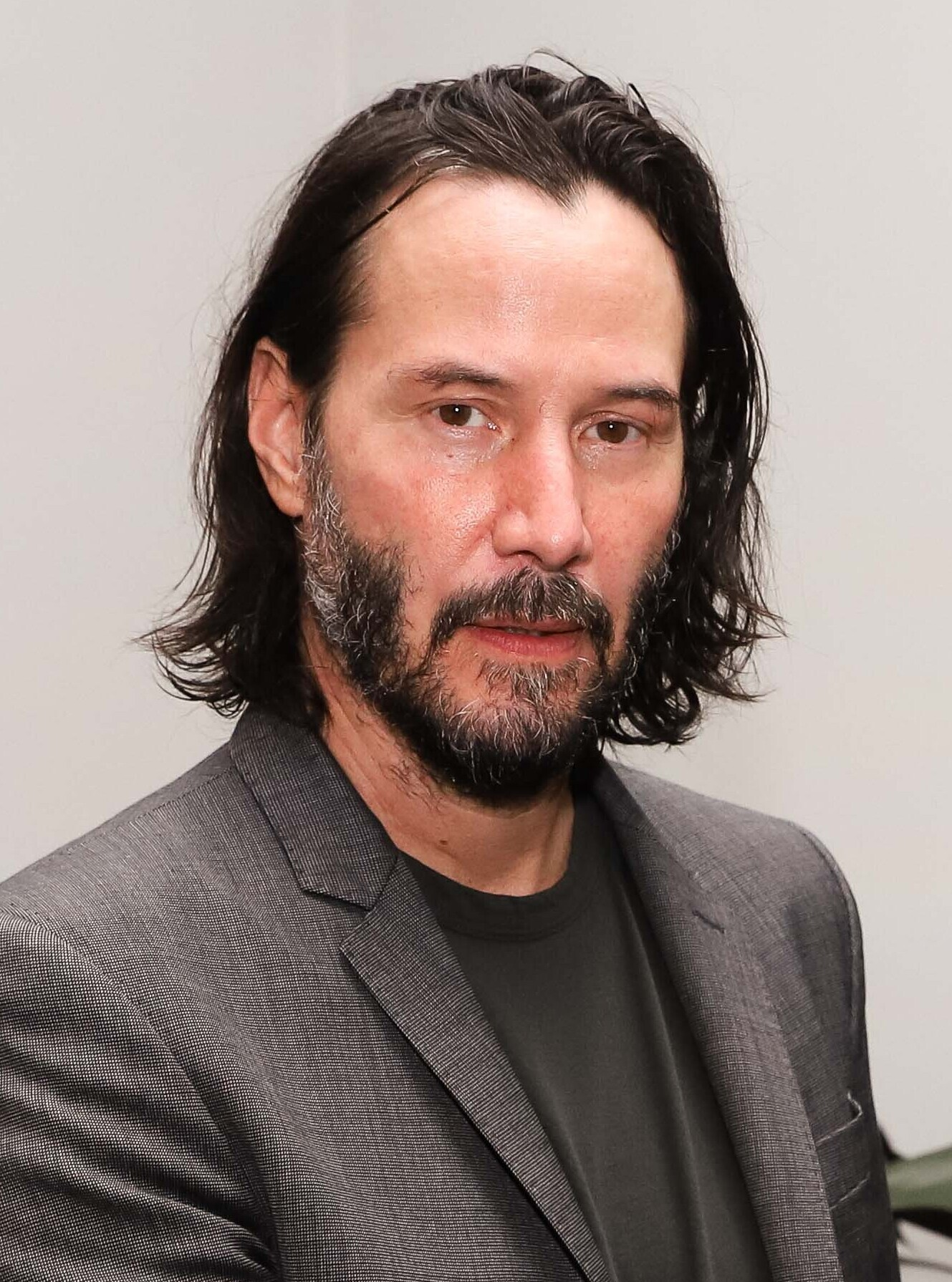
Keanu Reeves' appearance during Microsoft's show for Cyberpunk 2077 was one of E3 2019's most discussed events.

Microsoft held its press conference at the Microsoft Theater on June 9, 2019. They also demonstrated games through Inside Xbox on June 10, 2019. Among games promoted during the presentation included The Outer Worlds, Bleeding Edge, Ori and the Will of the Wisps, Minecraft Dungeons, Microsoft Flight Simulator, Star Wars Jedi: Fallen Order, Blair Witch, Cyberpunk 2077, Spiritfarer, Battletoads, The Legend of Wright, Age of Empires II: Definitive Edition, Wasteland 3, Psychonauts 2, Lego Star Wars: The Skywalker Saga, Dragon Ball Z: Kakarot, 12 Minutes, Way to the Woods, Gears 5, Dying Light 2, Forza Horizon 4: Lego Speed Champions, State of Decay 2: Heartland, Phantasy Star Online 2, Crossfire X, Tales of Arise, Borderlands 3, and Elden Ring. Microsoft also announced its acquisition of Double Fine and the publishing rights to its upcoming Psychonauts 2.

Service and hardware announcements by Microsoft included a Windows 10 version of the Xbox Game Pass subscription service (which would be included in a larger "Game Pass Ultimate" service, bundled with the console version and an Xbox Live Gold subscription), that its "Project xCloud" cloud gaming platform would receive a public beta in late-2019, as well as an updated version of the Elite controller.

Microsoft also teased "Project Scarlett", a successor to Xbox One.

During the presentation for Cyberpunk 2077, Keanu Reeves briefly took the floor revealing that he was voicing for a character in his likeness for the game. As he came out, one fan yelled out "You're breathtaking!", to which Reeves pointed and replied back to the audience, "You're breathtaking! You're all breathtaking!" Reeves' phrase since became an Internet meme. In planning for E3 2020, ESA president Stanley Pierre-Louis said that the unexpected Reeves moment was something they were inspired by and wanted to help set the potential for in E3 2020 and future expositions.

=== Bethesda Softworks ===
Bethesda Softworks had its press conference on June 9, 2019. Featured games included Fallout 76, The Elder Scrolls: Blades, Ghostwire: Tokyo, The Elder Scrolls Online, Commander Keen Mobile, The Elder Scrolls: Legends, Rage 2, Wolfenstein: Cyberpilot, Wolfenstein: Youngblood, Deathloop, and Doom Eternal. They also revealed their Orion software, a middleware package that is aimed to help improve the speed and latency for playing games over a stream.

=== Devolver Digital ===
Devolver Digital presented its third "Big Fancy Press Conference"—continuing on from the storyline of previous installments with a "Devolver Direct" presentation directly parodying those of Nintendo. The pre-recorded video showcased several games, including Carrion, Fall Guys: Ultimate Knockout, a new free DLC for The Messenger, and Devolver Bootleg—a compilation of several "bootleg" versions of existing Devolver titles (including Enter the Gun Dungeon and Hotline Milwaukee among others). Devolver also announced Enter the Gungeon: House of the Gundead, a spin-off arcade light gun shooter game.

=== PC Gaming Show ===
PC Gamer presented its PC Gaming Show event on June 10, 2019. Among developers and publishers presented included Annapurna Interactive, Chucklefish, Digital Extremes, Digital Uppercut, Epic Games, E-WIN, Fatshark, Fellow Traveller, Frontier Developments, Funcom, Modus Games, Paradox Interactive, Perfect World Entertainment, Raw Fury, Rebellion, Re-Logic, and Tripwire Interactive. Among games presented include Evil Genius 2, Vampire: The Masquerade – Bloodlines 2, Starmancer, Chivalry 2, Mosaic, Quantum Error, Midnight Ghost Hunt, Unexplored 2: A Wayfarer's Journey, Mutant Year Zero, Conan Unconquered, Moons of Madness, Conan: Chop-Chop, Last Oasis, Age of Wonders: Planetfall, Zombie Army 4, Remnant: From the Ashes, Griftlands, Planet Zoo, Battletoads, Sayonara Wild Hearts, Shenmue III, Songs of Conquest, Warhammer: Vermintide 2, Per Aspera, Ancestors: The Humankind Odyssey, Auto Chess, CrisTales, Valfaris, Borderlands 3, Maneater, Scavengers, Terraria, Firewall: Zero Hour, Telling Lies, Warframe, Dragon Age 4, Genesis Noir, El Hijo, and Baldur's Gate III.

=== Ubisoft ===
Ubisoft broadcast its press conference on June 10, 2019. Among featured games included Watch Dogs: Legion, Tom Clancy's Rainbow Six Siege, Brawlhalla, Tom Clancy's Ghost Recon Breakpoint (including a brief presentation by Jon Bernthal), Tom Clancy's Elite Squad, Just Dance 2020, For Honor, Tom Clancy's Rainbow Six Quarantine, Tom Clancy's The Division 2, Roller Champions, and Gods and Monsters.

Ubisoft announced its "UPlay Plus" subscription service to its catalog of games for PC users and later on Stadia, starting in September 2019. In addition to games, Ubisoft announced that there would be an Assassins' Creed symphonic tour in 2019, featuring music from the various games. Rob McElhenney announced that he would be producing and starring in a series inspired by Ubisoft called Mythic Quest for Apple TV+.

=== Square Enix ===
Square Enix streamed its announcement broadcast on June 10, 2019. This slot has been previously occupied by Sony and has used it for its press conference in previous years. Featured games included: Final Fantasy VII Remake, Life Is Strange 2, Final Fantasy Crystal Chronicles, Octopath Traveler, The Last Remnant Remastered, Dragon Quest Builders 2, Dragon Quest XI S, Circuit Superstars, Kingdom Hearts III, Battalion 1944, Final Fantasy XIV, Dying Light 2, Romancing Saga 3, SaGa: Scarlet Grace, Final Fantasy Brave Exvius, War of the Visions: Final Fantasy Brave Exvius, Outriders, Oninaki, Final Fantasy VIII Remastered, and Avengers.

=== Nintendo ===
Nintendo held an E3 Nintendo Direct presentation on June 11, 2019. Games featured included Super Smash Bros. Ultimate, Dragon Quest XI, Luigi's Mansion 3, The Dark Crystal: Age of Resistance Tactics, The Legend of Zelda: Link's Awakening, Trials of Mana, Collection of Mana, The Witcher 3: Wild Hunt, Fire Emblem: Three Houses, Resident Evil 5, Resident Evil 6, No More Heroes III, Contra: Rogue Corps, Contra Anniversary Collection, Daemon X Machina, Panzer Dragoon, Pokémon Sword and Shield, Astral Chain, Empire of Sin, Marvel Ultimate Alliance 3: The Black Order, Cadence of Hyrule, Mario & Sonic at the Olympic Games Tokyo 2020, Animal Crossing: New Horizons, and a sequel to The Legend of Zelda: Breath of the Wild. Nintendo went into more details about these games and other titles through their Treehouse Live event streamed throughout the convention.

== Other events ==
=== Stadia ===
While Google did not attend E3 2019, they presented detailed information about their Stadia game streaming platform on June 6, 2019, just prior to the event. Among games highlighted during the presentation for the Stadia platform included Baldur's Gate III, Ghost Recon Breakpoint, Gylt, Get Packed, Tom Clancy's The Division 2, and Destiny 2.

=== Bungie ===
Bungie held a streaming presentation on the upcoming changes to Destiny 2 on June 6, 2019, following Google's presentation on Stadia. Among major changes announced included the reveal of its next major expansion, Shadowkeep, the game adopting a free to play model, cross-save across platforms, shifting the PC distribution from Battle.net to Steam, and new support for Stadia.

=== Electronic Arts ===
As in the past few E3s, Electronic Arts (EA) did not participate directly with E3, but instead held its public EA Play event the week prior to E3, from June 8–9, 2019, at the Hollywood Palladium. EA did not have a media briefing and instead offered multiple livestreams on June 8, 2019, for its games, focusing on Star Wars Jedi: Fallen Order, Apex Legends, Battlefield V, FIFA 20, Madden NFL 20 and The Sims 4. During these streams, the company also announced three new titles for its EA Originals programs, RustHeart from GlowMade, Lost in Random from Zoink, and an unnamed title from Hazelight Studios.

=== UploadVR ===
UploadVR broadcast a pre-recorded presentation, including new game reveals, on June 10, 2019. Among featured games were: Budget Cuts 2: Mission Insolvency, Garden of the Sea, The Curious Tale of the Stolen Pets, Pistol Whip VR, Golem, Hotel RnR, I Expect You to Die: Seat of Power, Echo Arena, Arizona Sunshine, Hotdogs, Horseshoes & Hand Grenades, Angry Birds VR and Boneworks.

=== Limited Run Games ===
Limited Run Games, a boutique publisher, broadcast its press conference on June 10, 2019. The company announced over fifty planned releases of various indie games for the Nintendo Switch, PlayStation 4, Nintendo 3DS, as well as several titles for the PlayStation Vita. Additionally, they announced planned collectors editions of several old LucasArts games from the Star Wars and the Monkey Island series.

The games that were announced included Night in the Woods for mobile devices. For the PlayStation Vita, their last physical games are Deadbolt, Guacamelee, Super Mutant Alien Assault, Pix the Cat, Revenant Dogma, Mutant Blobs Attack, Rocketbirds Hardboiled Chicken, Rocketbirds 2: Evolution, Atari Flashback Classics, Super Meat Boy, Damascus Gear Operation Osaka, Damascus Gear Operation Tokyo, and Metal Slug 3. They also launched a Power Rangers game called Power Rangers: Battle for the Grid.

=== AMD ===
A first for the company, AMD hosted its first press conference, titled "Next Horizon Gaming", on June 10, 2019.

=== Kinda Funny Games ===
Kinda Funny Games streamed its showcase on June 10, 2019. Among games shown included: CastleStorm 2, Stronghold: Warlords, Lucifer Within Us, Funtime, Half Past Fate, Superliminal, and Undying.

=== E3 Coliseum ===
E3 Coliseum, a side event designed around public interaction with the developers and publishers, returned to E3 this year. Among notable presentations include:

- Content developer/streaming service Netflix held a panel at E3 related to its content and associated video game efforts.
- Geoff Keighley hosted a Psychonauts 2 panel with Tim Schafer and Jack Black.
- Writers and producers of the TV series The Simpsons held a panel.
- Infinity Ward held a panel to discuss their new game, Call of Duty: Modern Warfare.

=== BAFTA Special Award ===
During E3, the British Academy of Film and Television Arts (BAFTA) held a special ceremony in Los Angeles to give Epic Games a BAFTA Special Award in Video Games for the company's "impact on the global games industry".

=== Esport events ===
Nintendo held competitions for Super Smash Bros. Ultimate and Splatoon 2, as well as a tournament for the recently announced Super Mario Maker 2 on June 8, 2019.

Epic Games held a two-day event at The Forum from June 14–15, 2019 to focus on several Fortnite activities. This included the second Fortnite Celebrity Pro-Am event, which was won by streamer Airwaks and musician RL Grime.

== List of featured games ==
This is a list of notable games that appeared at E3 2019 and its related events, listed by publisher or developer.

2K Games: Borderlands 3 (PC / PS4 / Xbox One / Stadia); Activision: Call of Duty: Modern Warfare (PC / PS4 / Xbox One); Crash Team Racing Nitro-Fueled (PS4 / Switch / Xbox One); Spyro Reignited Trilogy (PC / Switch); Annapurna Interactive: 12 Minutes (PC / Xbox One); Asmodee: Catan (Switch); Atlus: Catherine: Full Body (PS4 / PS Vita); Persona 5 Royal (PS4); Persona Q2: New Cinema Labyrinth (3DS); Bandai Namco Entertainment: Code Vein (PC / PS4 / Xbox One); Disney Tsum Tsum Festival (Switch); Dragon Ball Z: Kakarot (PC / PS4 / Xbox One); Elden Ring (PC / PS4 / Xbox One); Ni no Kuni: Wrath of the White Witch (PC / PS4 / Switch); Tales of Arise (PC / PS4 / Xbox One); The Dark Pictures: Man of Medan (PC / PS4 / Xbox One); Bethesda Softworks: Commander Keen (Android / iOS); Deathloop (TBA); Doom Eternal (PC / PS4 / Switch / Xbox One / Stadia); The Elder Scrolls: Blades (Android / iOS / Switch); The Elder Scrolls: Legends (Android / iOS / PC); The Elder Scrolls Online (PC / PS4 / Xbox One / Stadia); Fallout 76 (PC / PS4 / Xbox One); Ghostwire: Tokyo (TBA); Rage 2 (PC / PS4 / Xbox One / Stadia); Wolfenstein: Cyberpilot (VR); Wolfenstein: Youngblood (PC / PS4 / Switch / Xbox One / Stadia); Bigben Interactive: Bee Simulator (PC / PS4 / Switch / Xbox One); Farmer's Dynasty (PC / PS4 / Switch / Xbox One); The Fisherman – Fishing Planet (PS4 / Xbox One); Overpass (PC / PS4 / Switch / Xbox One); Paranoia: Happiness is Mandatory (PC); The Sinking City (PC / PS4 / Switch / Xbox One); Werewolf: The Apocalypse – Earthblood (PC / PS4 / Xbox One); WRC 8 (PC / PS4 / Switch / Xbox One); Bungie: Destiny 2 (PC / PS4 / Xbox One / Stadia); Capcom: Monster Hunter: World (PC / PS4 / Xbox One); Resident Evil 5 (Switch); Resident Evil 6 (Switch); CD Projekt Red: Cyberpunk 2077 (PC / PS4 / Xbox One); The Witcher 3: Wild Hunt (Switch); Devolver Digital: Carrion (PC / PS4 / Switch / Xbox One); Devolver Bootleg (PC); Enter the Gungeon: House of the Gundead (Arcade); Fall Guys: Ultimate Knockout (PC / PS4); My Friend Pedro (PC / Switch); The Messenger (PC / PS4 / Switch); Digital Extremes: Warframe (PC / PS4 / Switch / Xbox One); Desk Works: RPG Time: The Legend of Wright (Android / iOS / PC / Xbox One); Electronic Arts: Anthem (PC / PS4 / Xbox One); Apex Legends (PC / PS4 / Xbox One); Battlefield V (PC / PS4 / Xbox One); FIFA 20 (PC / PS4 / Switch / Xbox One); Untitled Hazelight Studios game; Lost in Random; Madden NFL 20 (PC / PS4 / Xbox One); RustHeart; Sea of Solitude (PC / PS4 / Xbox One); The Sims 4 (PC / PS4 / Xbox One); Star Wars Jedi: Fallen Order (PC / PS4 / Xbox One)	Epic Games: Fortnite Battle Royale (Android / iOS / PC / PS4 / Switch / Xbox One); Frontier Developments: Planet Zoo (PC); Good Shepherd Entertainment: John Wick Hex (PC); Grasshopper Manufacture: No More Heroes III (Switch); GungHo Online Entertainment: Grandia HD Collection (PC / Switch); Happy Bee: Way to the Woods (PC / Xbox One); inXile Entertainment: Wasteland 3 (PC / PS4 / Xbox One); Koch Media: Dead by Daylight (Switch); Konami: Contra Anniversary Collection (PC / PS4 / Switch / Xbox One); Contra: Rogue Corps (PC / PS4 / Switch / Xbox One); Lionsgate Games: Blair Witch (PC / Xbox One); Modus Games: Ary and the Secret of Seasons (PC / PS4 / Switch / Xbox One); Bear With Me: The Lost Robots (PC / PS4 / Switch / Xbox One); Lost Words: Beyond the Page (PC / PS4 / Switch / Xbox One); Trine 4: The Nightmare Prince (PC / PS4 / Switch / Xbox One); Natsume Inc.: Cosmic Defenders (Switch); Harvest Moon: Mad Dash (PS4 / Switch); Reel Fishing: Road Trip Adventure (PS4 / Switch); Netflix: The Dark Crystal: Age of Resistance Tactics (PC / PS4 / Switch / Xbox One); Stranger Things (Android / iOS); Stranger Things 3: The Game (Android / iOS / PC / PS4 / Switch / Xbox One); Nintendo: Animal Crossing: New Horizons (Switch); Astral Chain (Switch); Cadence of Hyrule (Switch); Daemon X Machina (Switch); Fire Emblem: Three Houses (Switch); Untitled The Legend of Zelda: Breath of the Wild sequel (Switch); The Legend of Zelda: Link's Awakening (Switch); Luigi's Mansion 3 (Switch); Marvel Ultimate Alliance 3: The Black Order (Switch); Pokémon Sword and Shield (Switch); Splatoon 2 (Switch); Super Mario Maker 2 (Switch); Super Smash Bros. Ultimate (Switch); NIS America: The Legend of Heroes: Trails of Cold Steel III (PS4); Paradox Interactive: Empire of Sin (PC / PS4 / Switch / Xbox One); Vampire: The Masquerade – Bloodlines 2 (PC / PS4 / Xbox One); Phoenix Labs: Dauntless (Switch); Playful Corp.: New Super Lucky's Tale (Switch); Private Division: Ancestors: The Humankind Odyssey (PC / PS4 / Xbox One); The Outer Worlds (PC / PS4 / Xbox One); Rebellion Developments: Evil Genius 2 (PC); Sega: Alien: Isolation (Switch); Panzer Dragoon (Switch); Judgment (PS4); Mario & Sonic at the Olympic Games Tokyo 2020 (Arcade / Switch); Phantasy Star Online 2 (PC / Xbox One); Smilegate: Crossfire X (PC / Xbox One)	Square Enix: Avengers (PC / PS4 / Xbox One); Battalion 1944 (PC); Circuit Superstars (PC / PS4 / Switch / Xbox One); Collection of Mana (Switch); Dragon Quest XI S (Switch); Dragon Quest Builders 2 (PS4 / Switch); Dying Light 2 (PC / PS4 / Xbox One); Final Fantasy VII Remake (PS4); Final Fantasy VIII Remastered (PC / PS4 / Switch / Xbox One); Final Fantasy XIV (PC / PS4); Final Fantasy Crystal Chronicles: Remastered Edition (Android / iOS / PS4 / Switch); Kingdom Hearts III (PS4 / Xbox One); The Last Remnant Remastered (Switch); Life Is Strange 2 (PC / PS4 / Xbox One); Octopath Traveler (PC); Oninaki (PC / PS4 / Switch); Outriders (PC / PS4 / Xbox One); Romancing SaGa 3 (Android / iOS / PC / PS4 / Switch / Vita / Xbox One); SaGa: Scarlet Grace Ambitions (Android / iOS / PC / PS4 / Switch); Trials of Mana (PS4 / Switch / PC); War of the Visions: Final Fantasy Brave Exvius (Android / iOS); Team17: Yooka-Laylee and the Impossible Lair (PC / PS4 / Switch / Xbox One); Team Cherry: Hollow Knight: Silksong (PC / Switch); Thunder Lotus Games: Spiritfarer (PC / PS4 / Switch / Xbox One); THQ Nordic: Biomutant (PC / PS4 / Xbox One); Darksiders Genesis (PC / PS4 / Switch / Xbox One / Stadia); Desperados III (PC / PS4 / Xbox One); Destroy All Humans! (PC / PS4 / Xbox One); Monster Jam: Steel Titans (PC / PS4 / Xbox One); SpongeBob SquarePants: Battle for Bikini Bottom – Rehydrated (PC / PS4 / Switch / Xbox One); Wreckfest (PS4 / Xbox One); Tripwire Interactive: Maneater (PC); Ubisoft: Brawlhalla (PC / PS4 / Switch / Xbox One); For Honor (PC / PS4 / Xbox One); Gods and Monsters (PC / PS4 / Switch / Xbox One); Just Dance 2020 (PS4 / Switch / Wii / Xbox One / Stadia); Roller Champions (PC); Tom Clancy's The Division 2 (PC / PS4 / Xbox One / Stadia); Tom Clancy's Elite Squad (Android / iOS); Tom Clancy's Ghost Recon Breakpoint (PC / PS4 / Xbox One / Stadia); Tom Clancy's Rainbow Six Quarantine (PC / PS4 / Xbox One); Tom Clancy's Rainbow Six Siege (PC / PS4 / Xbox One); Watch Dogs: Legion (PC / PS4 / Xbox One); Vertex Pop: Super Crush K.O (PC / Switch); Warner Bros. Interactive Entertainment: Lego Star Wars: The Skywalker Saga (PC / PS4 / Switch / Xbox One); Wizards of the Coast: Baldur's Gate III (PC / Stadia); Xbox Game Studios: Age of Empires II: Definitive Edition (PC / Xbox One); Battletoads (PC / Xbox One); Bleeding Edge (PC / Xbox One); Forza Horizon 4: Lego Speed Champions (PC / Xbox One); Gears 5 (PC / Xbox One); Gears Pop! (Android / iOS); Halo Infinite (PC / Scarlett / Xbox One); Halo: The Master Chief Collection (PC / Xbox One); Microsoft Flight Simulator (PC / Xbox One); Minecraft Dungeons (PC / PS4 / Switch / Xbox One); Ori and the Will of the Wisps (PC / Xbox One); Psychonauts 2 (PC / PS4 / Xbox One); State of Decay 2: Heartland (PC / Xbox One); Xseed Games: Akiba's Trip: Hellbound & Debriefed (PC / PS4); BurgerTime Party! (Switch); Granblue Fantasy Versus (PS4); Heroland (PS4 / Switch); Rune Factory 4 Special (Switch); Sakuna: Of Rice and Ruin (PC / PS4 / Switch); Senran Kagura: Peach Ball (PC / Switch)
