= E3 2018 =

24th annual Electronic Entertainment Expo

Electronic Entertainment Expo 2018

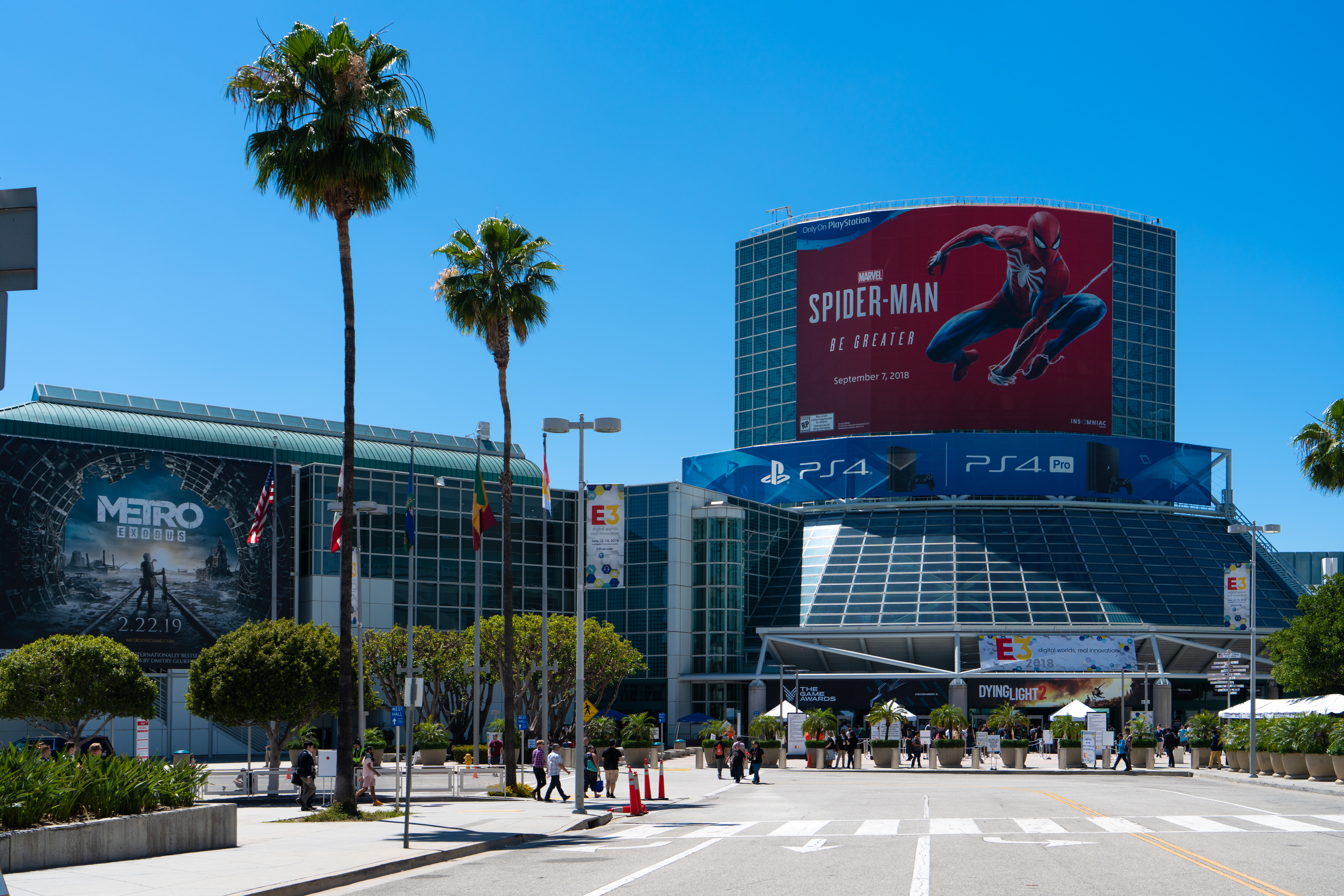
- View of Los Angeles Convention Center on E3 2018
- Genre: Video game industry
- Begins: June 12, 2018
- Ends: June 14, 2018
- Venue: Los Angeles Convention Center
- Locations: Los Angeles, California
- Country: United States
- Previous event: E3 2017
- Next event: E3 2019
- Attendance: 69,200
- Organizer: Entertainment Software Association
- Filing status: Non-profit

The Electronic Entertainment Expo 2018 (E3 2018) was the 24th E3, during which hardware manufacturers, software developers, and publishers from the video game industry presented new and upcoming products to the attendees, primarily retailers and members of the video game press. The event, organized by the Entertainment Software Association (ESA), took place at the Los Angeles Convention Center from June 12–14, 2018, with many companies holding press conferences in the days prior. With the industry still in the middle of the eighth generation of video game consoles, no new hardware was introduced, and publishers and developers principally focused on new games to be released in 2018 and beyond. The event drew 69,200 attendees, the largest since 2005.

E3 2018 was the final time Sony Interactive Entertainment participated in the conference. Sony would skip E3 2019 and E3 2021 entirely before the expo went defunct in 2023.

== Format and changes ==
E3 2018 took place from June 12 to 14, 2018 in the Los Angeles Convention Center. In the days prior, major publishers hold press conferences, typically as a live presentation in a large theater with streaming broadcast, or through streaming pre-recorded segments, highlighting the new games that are planned for the next year. During the show proper, developers and publishers run exhibition booths to allow industry members, the press, retail representatives, and the public to try out the new games and talk with the creators. Several side events were also held in nearby venues, including video game tournaments.

Like the previous year, E3 2018 offered public access passes to the event, following from its first such offering during E3 2017. However, to address issues with over-crowding in the exhibitor halls, E3 2018 was open on two days with industry-only access for a few hours before permitting public access to the exhibitors. Only those with complimentary industry passes and publicly purchasable business passes were able to take part in these exclusive hours. 1,000 of the public passes, called "Gamer Passes" were sold at US$149 with the rest of the public passes being sold for $249 on a first-come–first-served basis. Those passes, as well as the business passes went on sale on February 12, 2018.

== Press conferences ==
=== Electronic Arts ===
Electronic Arts ran a separate event near the Convention Center, rather than participating at the Expo. The EA Play 2018 event was held at the Hollywood Palladium from June 9 to June 11. EA's press conference was held on June 9 at 11:00am, and covered Battlefield V, and FIFA 19, Star Wars Jedi: Fallen Order, Star Wars Battlefront II, Unravel Two, Sea of Solitude, NBA Live 19, Madden NFL 19, Command & Conquer: Rivals, and Anthem. EA also announced that its Origin software service will expand to include a premium subscription service to provide access to titles prior to retail release, and support cloud gaming support later in the year.

=== Microsoft ===
Microsoft's press conference was held on June 10 at the Microsoft Theater. During Major Nelson's Podcast, Microsoft's Executive Vice President of Gaming Phil Spencer said Microsoft's press conference had made positive changes from prior years to be fun for everyone. Fifty games were covered during the presentation, including Halo Infinite, Ori and the Will of the Wisps, Sekiro: Shadows Die Twice, Fallout 76, The Awesome Adventures of Captain Spirit, Crackdown 3, Nier: Automata, Metro Exodus, Kingdom Hearts III, Sea of Thieves, Battlefield V, Forza Horizon 4, We Happy Few, PlayerUnknown's Battlegrounds, Tales of Vesperia, Tom Clancy's The Division 2, Shadow of the Tomb Raider, Session, Black Desert Online, Devil May Cry 5, Cuphead, Tunic, Jump Force, Dying Light 2, Battletoads, Just Cause 4, Gears Pop!, Gears Tactics, Gears 5, and Cyberpunk 2077.

Phil Spencer also affirmed that Microsoft Studios had acquired Undead Labs, Playground Games, Ninja Theory, and Compulsion Games, and had established a new in-house studio, The Initiative.

Microsoft had an exhibitor space in the main convention floor, principally dedicated to its Mixer live streaming platform, while it hosted demos and other activities at the Microsoft Theater alongside the other exhibition days.

=== Bethesda ===
Bethesda Softworks held its E3 presentation on June 10 at 6:30pm. Games presented included Rage 2, The Elder Scrolls: Legends, The Elder Scrolls Online, Doom Eternal, Quake Champions, Prey, Wolfenstein II: The New Colossus, Wolfenstein: Youngblood, Wolfenstein: Cyberpilot, Fallout 76, Fallout Shelter, The Elder Scrolls: Blades, Starfield, and The Elder Scrolls VI.

=== Devolver Digital ===
Devolver Digital held an E3 presentation via Twitch on June 10 at 8:00pm. The presentation followed the satirical format of Devolver's E3 2017 presentation, a pre-recorded segment that poked fun at the state of E3 and video game marketing, and did not focus on the games. Actress Mahria Zook replayed her role as the fictional Devolver "Chief Synergy Officer" Nina Struthers. Devolver revealed its titles Scum, My Friend Pedro, and Metal Wolf Chaos XD.

=== Square Enix ===
Square Enix held its pre-recorded press conference over streaming video on June 11 at 10:00am. The media presentation covered Square Enix's upcoming games, including Shadow of the Tomb Raider, Final Fantasy XIV (including a crossover event with Capcom's Monster Hunter World), The Awesome Adventures of Captain Spirit, Dragon Quest XI, Babylon's Fall, Nier: Automata, Octopath Traveler, Just Cause 4, The Quiet Man, and Kingdom Hearts III.

=== Ubisoft ===
Ubisoft held its E3 press conference on June 11 at 1:00pm. Ubisoft presented its upcoming games, including Just Dance 2019, Beyond Good and Evil 2, Trials Rising, Tom Clancy's The Division 2, Skull & Bones, Transference, Starlink: Battle for Atlas (including the announcement that Fox McCloud from Nintendo's Star Fox franchise would be an exclusive character in the Switch version of the game), The Crew 2, and Assassin's Creed Odyssey. New DLC expansions for Mario + Rabbids Kingdom Battle (Donkey Kong Adventure) and For Honor (Marching Fire) were also announced, as well as an upcoming documentary entitled Another Mindset, which focuses on competitive Rainbow Six Siege.

=== PC Gaming Show ===
PC Gamer hosted their PC Gaming Show on June 11 at 3:00pm. The show included presentations from several publishers and developers including Sega, Square Enix, Crytek, Double Fine Productions, Hi-Rez Studios, Skydance Media, Digital Extremes, Raw Fury, Klei Entertainment, Modern Storyteller, tinyBuild, Cloud Imperium Games, Starbreeze, and 505 Games.

=== Sony ===
Sony hosted their press conference on June 11 at 6:00pm. Sony continued its "E3 Experience" where the event was simultaneously live-broadcast to a limited number of movie theaters. Addressing criticism of some of its past E3 press conferences, Sony planned to have "deep dives" on a handful of first-party titles during its conference, rather than a large number of short teasers for games, though would still cover other third-party and indie games. Sony focused on Death Stranding, Ghost of Tsushima, Spider-Man and The Last of Us Part II. Further, instead of having a pre-show prior to the press conference to announce selected titles, Sony used daily live-streaming announcements of games in the week prior to the conference to reveal new titles Tetris Effect, Twin Mirror, and Ghost Giant, giving the announcements of these games "more time to breathe". This was the final time Sony had participated in E3.

=== Nintendo ===
As with previous conferences since 2013 (with the exception of the 2016 expo), Nintendo streamed a pre-recorded Nintendo Direct video presentation on June 12 at 9:00am. This presentation focused on Nintendo Switch games releasing in 2018, with a specific focus on Super Smash Bros. Ultimate. Additional titles shown included Daemon X Machina, Xenoblade Chronicles 2, Pokémon: Let's Go, Pikachu! and Let's Go, Eevee!, Super Mario Party, Fire Emblem: Three Houses, Fortnite: Battle Royale, Arena of Valor, Paladins, Minecraft, Overcooked 2, Monster Hunter Generations Ultimate, Dragon Ball FighterZ, ARK: Survival Evolved, Mario Tennis Aces, Killer Queen Black, Hollow Knight, and Octopath Traveler.

== Other events ==
=== E3 Colisseum ===
E3 Colisseum, a side event designed around public interaction with the developers and publishers, returned to E3 this year from June 12 to June 14, 2018, as confirmed by Geoff Keighley via his Twitter account. Also confirmed by Geoff was that the event would be streamed live online. The event included a reunion of the cast members and Tim Schafer of Grim Fandango celebrated the game's 20th anniversary. The reunion event also featured live music from the remastered games composer Peter McConnell and a live reading of select scenes that would also feature Jack Black. Another game, Call of Duty: Black Ops 4 was also featured during the event, with TreyArch discussing the history of Zombies, its ravenous fan community, and what might be lurking around the corner next in the games series. It also featured Geoff Keighley, Joe Russo director of Avengers: Infinity War, Elijah Wood, Donald Mustard Worldwide Creative Director at Epic Games, Amy Hennig, 4 artists behind the game Cuphead, Hideo Kojima, Penn Jillette, Darren Aronofsky and Camilla Luddington along with the Shadow of the Tomb Raider Creative Team. The event took place at The Novo at L.A. Live, near the main convention center, and was available to all E3 attendees.

=== British Academy of Film and Television Arts ===
The British Academy of Film and Television Arts held a special ceremony on June 11, 2018 at the London West Hollywood to honor voice actor Nolan North with a Special Award for his "outstanding contribution to performance in games".

=== Video game tournaments/events ===
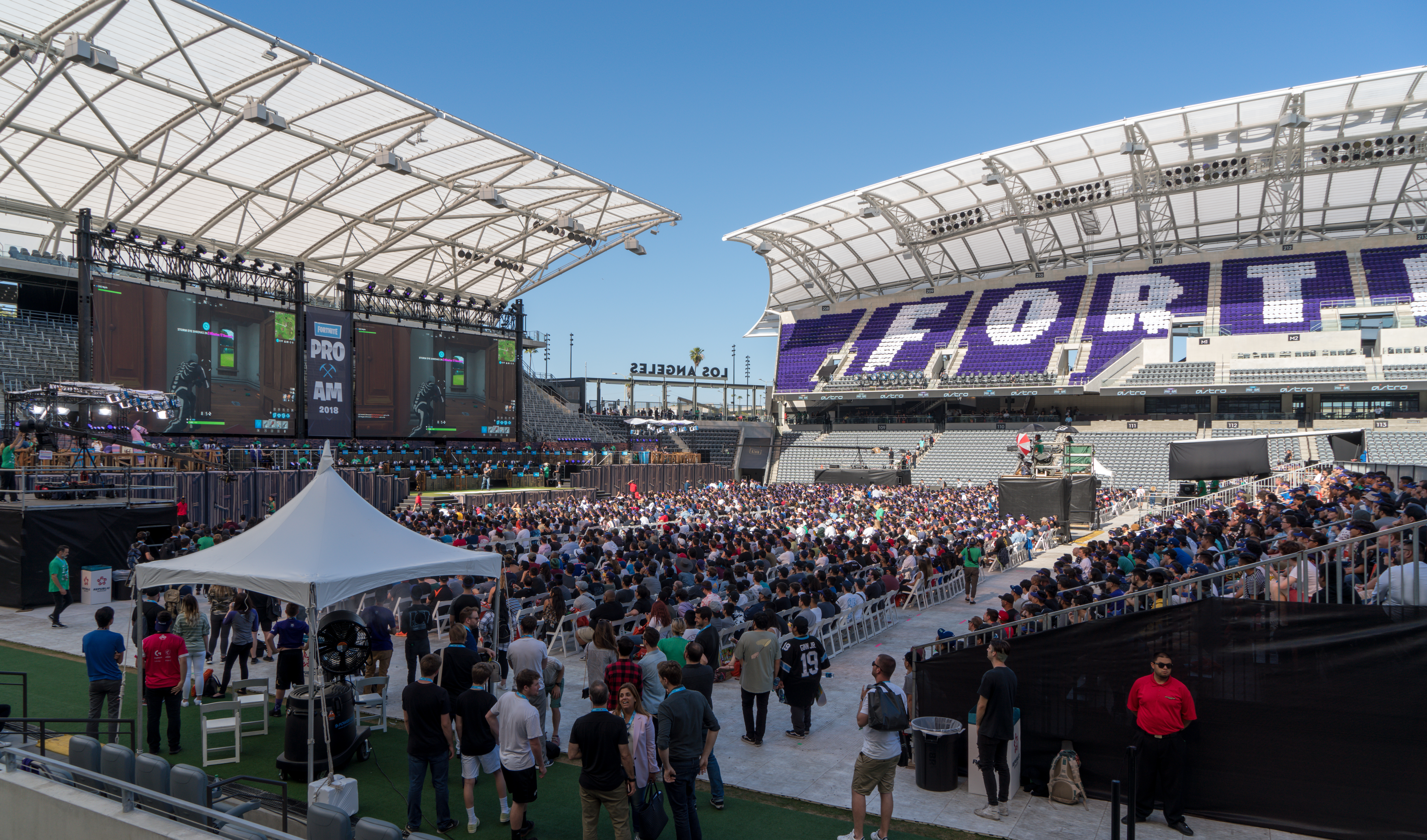
The Fortnite Battle Royale Pro-am event held at the Banc of California Stadium during the week of E3 2018.

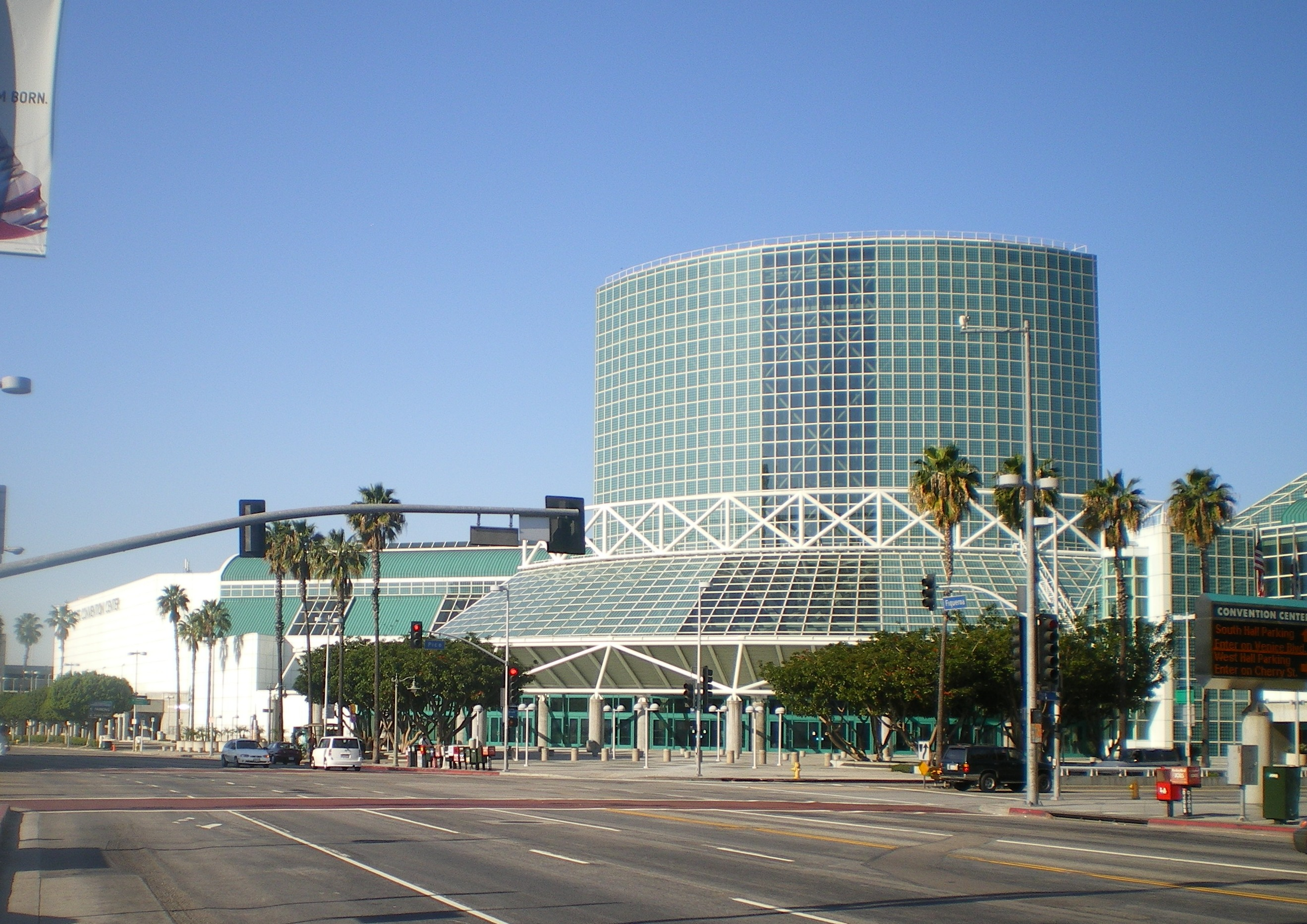
The Los Angeles Convention Center, where the expo has been held.

Epic Games held Fortnite Battle Royale Celebrity Pro-am at E3 2018, featuring 50 celebrities and 50 top players who competed. The event featured 50 pairs consisting of one streamer and celebrity, with the winning team receiving US$3 million to be donated to the winning team's charity of choice; announced participants include streamers Tyler "Ninja" Blevins and Markiplier, and celebrities Joel McHale, Paul George, and Marshmello. This event was announced following a Twitch stream in March 2018 by Ninja, which featured the celebrities, Drake, Travis Scott, Kim DotCom, and JuJu Smith-Schuster who were all playing the game Fortnite Battle Royale. The winners of the event was the team with Marshmello and Tyler "Ninja" Blevins.

Nintendo hosted live tournaments for both Splatoon 2 and the upcoming Super Smash Bros. Ultimate. The Splatoon 2 tournament, known as the Splatoon 2 World Championship 2018, featured the top teams from four regions—North America, Europe, Japan, and Australia—facing off in the first world championship for the game. The Super Smash Bros. tournament, known as the Super Smash Bros. Invitational 2018, was held at the Belasco Theater in Los Angeles on June 12. Nintendo invited eight top Super Smash Bros. players with plans to invite more who would compete in the new game, following a similar format they used in the E3 2014 Super Smash Bros. Invitational event.

Capcom hosted a Monster Hunter World tournament, where two-player teams would compete to complete a specific hunt in the fastest time possible. Capcom would stream the competition to online viewers.

Capcom also hosted a Street Fighter V rubber match between professional wrestlers Xavier Woods, Kofi Kingston & Big E of The New Day (representing WWE) vs. The new IWGP Heavyweight Champion Kenny Omega & The Young Bucks of The Elite (representing NJPW).

ESL Arena was a new arena space located in the South Hall of the Los Angeles Convention Center that would be used to host various esports events. The arena stage was a 7,500-square-foot dynamic esports experience that seats over 200 fans. The main stage featured custom player experiences with analysts and casters and gave the audience up-close VIP access to the world of competitive esports. The first esports events in the new space took place at E3 2018.

== List of featured games ==
This is a list of notable titles that appeared by their developers or publishers at E3 2018.

505 Games: Assetto Corsa Competizione (PC); Control (PC / PS4 / Xbox One); Don't Starve: Hamlet (PC); Indivisible (PC / PS4 / Switch / Xbox One); Underworld Ascendant (PC); Asmodee Digital: Carcassonne (Switch); Activision: Call of Duty: Black Ops 4 (PC / PS4 / Xbox One); Crash Bandicoot N. Sane Trilogy (PC / Switch / Xbox One); Destiny 2: Forsaken (PC / PS4 / Xbox One) DLC; Sekiro: Shadows Die Twice (PC / PS4 / Xbox One); Spyro Reignited Trilogy (PS4 / Xbox One); Annapurna Interactive: Outer Wilds (PC / Xbox One); Architect Interactive: Evasion (HTC Vive / Oculus Rift / PSVR); Atari: RollerCoaster Tycoon (Switch); Atlus: Catherine: Full Body (PS4 / PSV); Persona 3: Dancing in Moonlight (PS4 / PSV); Persona 5: Dancing in Starlight (PS4 / PSV); Automation Games: Mavericks: Proving Grounds (PC); Avalanche Studios: Generation Zero (PC / PS4 / Xbox One); Bandai Namco Entertainment: 11-11: Memories Retold (PC / PS4 / Xbox One); Code Vein (PC / PS4 / Xbox One); Dark Souls: Remastered (Switch); Divinity: Original Sin II (PS4 / Xbox One); Dragon Ball FighterZ (Switch); Jump Force (PC / PS4 / Xbox One); My Hero One's Justice (PC / PS4 / Switch / Xbox One); Naruto to Boruto: Shinobi Striker (PC / PS4 / Xbox One); Soulcalibur VI (PC / PS4 / Xbox One); Tales of Vesperia: Definitive Edition (PC / PS4 / Switch / Xbox One); Twin Mirror (PC / PS4 / Xbox One); Bethesda Softworks: Doom Eternal (PC / PS4 / Switch / Xbox One); The Elder Scrolls VI (TBA); The Elder Scrolls: Blades (Mobile); The Elder Scrolls: Legends (Mobile / PC / PS4 / Switch / Xbox One); The Elder Scrolls Online (PC / PS4 / Xbox One); Fallout 76 (PC / PS4 / Xbox One); Fallout Shelter (Mobile / PC / PS4 / Switch / Xbox One); Prey (PC / PS4 / Xbox One) DLC; Quake Champions (PC)^{a}; Rage 2 (PC / PS4 / Xbox One); Starfield (TBA); Wolfenstein: Cyberpilot (VR); Wolfenstein: Youngblood (PC / PS4 / Switch / Xbox One); Wolfenstein II: The New Colossus (PC / PS4 / Switch / Xbox One); Bumblebear Games: Killer Queen Black (PC / Switch); Capcom: Devil May Cry 5 (PC / PS4 / Xbox One); Mega Man 11 (PC / PS4 / Switch / Xbox One); Mega Man X Legacy Collection (PC / PS4 / Switch / Xbox One); Monster Hunter Generations Ultimate (Switch); Monster Hunter: World (PC / PS4 / Xbox One); Resident Evil 2 (PC / PS4 / Xbox One); Street Fighter 30th Anniversary Collection (PC / PS4 / Switch / Xbox One); Street Fighter V: Arcade Edition (PC / PS4); CD Projekt: Cyberpunk 2077 (PC / PS4 / Xbox One); Coffee Stain Studios: Satisfactory (PC); Crytek: Hunt: Showdown (PC); Deep Silver: Metro Exodus (PC / PS4 / Xbox One); Wasteland 2 (Switch); Devolver Digital: Metal Wolf Chaos XD (PC / PS4 / Xbox One); My Friend Pedro (PC / Switch); Scum (PC); Serious Sam 4: Planet Badass (PC); The Messenger (PC / Switch); Digital Extremes: Warframe (PC)	Electronic Arts: Anthem (PC / PS4 / Xbox One); Battlefield V (PC / PS4 / Xbox One); Command & Conquer: Rivals (iOS / Android); FIFA 18 (PC / PS3 / PS4 / Switch / Xbox 360 / Xbox One) DLC; FIFA 19 (PC / PS3 / PS4 / Switch / Xbox 360 / Xbox One); Madden NFL 19 (PC / PS4 / Xbox One); Madden NFL Overdrive (iOS / Android); NBA Live 19 (PS4 / Xbox One); Sea of Solitude (PC / PS4 / Xbox One); The Sims 4: Seasons (PC); Star Wars Battlefront II (PC / PS4 / Xbox One) DLC; Star Wars: Jedi Fallen Order (TBA); Unravel Two (PC / PS4 / Xbox One); Epic Games: Fortnite Battle Royale (Mobile / PC / PS4 / Switch / Xbox One); FDG Entertainment: Monster Boy and the Cursed Kingdom (PC / PS4 / Switch / Xbox One); Finji: Tunic (PC / Xbox One); Focus Home Interactive: A Plague Tale: Innocence (PC / PS4 / Xbox One); Call of Cthulhu: The Official Video Game (PC / PS4 / Xbox One); Farming Simulator 19 (PC / PS4 / Xbox One); Fear the Wolves (PC / PS4 / Xbox One); GreedFall (PC / PS4 / Xbox One); Insurgency: Sandstorm (PC / PS4 / Xbox One); The Surge 2 (PC / PS4 / Xbox One); GalaxyTrail: Freedom Planet (Switch); Gearbox Publishing: We Happy Few (PC / PS4 / Xbox One); GungHo Online Entertainment: Ninjala (Switch); Hi-Rez Studios: Paladins (PC / PS4 / Switch / Xbox One); Realm Royale (PC / macOS); Hyperbolic Magnetism: Beat Saber (Oculus Rift / PSVR); Insomniac Games: Stormland (Oculus Rift); Koei Tecmo: Dead or Alive 6 (PC / PS4 / Xbox One); Nioh 2 (PS4); Konami: Hyper Sports R (Switch); Pro Evolution Soccer 2019 (PC / PS4 / Xbox One); Super Bomberman R (PC / PS4 / Xbox One); Limited Run Games: Double Switch (PS4); Dust: An Elysian Tail (Switch); Microsoft Studios: Battletoads (PC / Xbox One); Crackdown 3 (PC / Xbox One); Cuphead (PC / Xbox One) DLC; Forza Horizon 4 (PC / Xbox One); Gears 5 (PC / Xbox One); Gears Pop! (Mobile); Gears Tactics (PC); Halo Infinite (PC / Xbox One); Ori and the Will of the Wisps (PC / Xbox One); PlayerUnknown's Battlegrounds (PC / Xbox One) DLC; Session (PC / Xbox One); Sea of Thieves (PC / Xbox One) DLC; Modern Storytelling: The Forgotten City (PC); Mojang: Minecraft (Switch); Nintendo: Captain Toad: Treasure Tracker (3DS / Switch); Daemon X Machina (Switch); Fire Emblem: Three Houses (Switch); Mario Tennis Aces (Switch); Pokémon: Let's Go, Pikachu! and Let's Go, Eevee! (Switch); Splatoon 2: Octo Expansion (Switch) DLC; Super Mario Party (Switch); Super Smash Bros. Ultimate (Switch); Sushi Striker: The Way of Sushido (3DS / Switch); Xenoblade Chronicles 2: Torna ~ The Golden Country (Switch) DLC; NIS America: Disgaea 1 Complete (PS4 / Switch); Labyrinth of Refrain: Coven of Dusk (PC / PS4 / Switch); SNK 40th Anniversary Collection (Switch); SNK Heroines: Tag Team Frenzy (PS4 / Switch); Ys VIII: Lacrimosa of Dana (Switch); Owlchemy Labs: Vacation Simulator (Oculus Rift / PSVR); Rebellion Developments: Strange Brigade (PC / PS4 / Xbox One)	Sega: Fist of the North Star: Lost Paradise (PS4); Puyo Puyo Tetris (PC); Shenmue 1+2 (PC / PS4 / Xbox One); Shining Resonance Refrain (PC / PS4 / Switch / Xbox One); Sonic Mania Plus (PC / PS4 / Switch / Xbox One); Team Sonic Racing (PC / PS4 / Switch / Xbox One); Total War: Three Kingdoms (PC); Two Point Hospital (PC); Valkyria Chronicles 4 (PC / PS4 / Switch / Xbox One); Yakuza 0 (PC); Yakuza Kiwami (PC / PS4); Yakuza Kiwami 2 (PS4); Snail Games USA: PixArk (PC / Switch); Sony Interactive Entertainment: Astro Bot Rescue Mission (PSVR); Concrete Genie (PS4); Days Gone (PS4); Death Stranding (PS4); Déraciné (PSVR); Dreams (PS4); Firewall: Zero Hour (PSVR); Ghost Giant (PSVR); Ghost of Tsushima (PS4); The Last of Us Part II (PS4); Spider-Man (PS4); Tetris Effect (PS4 / PSVR); Squanch Games: Trover Saves the Universe (PS4 / PSVR); Square Enix: The Awesome Adventures of Captain Spirit (PC / PS4 / Xbox One); Babylon's Fall (PC / PS4); Dragon Quest XI (PC / PS4); Final Fantasy XIV (PC / PS4); Just Cause 4 (PC / PS4 / Xbox One); Kingdom Hearts III (PS4 / Xbox One); Nier: Automata (Xbox One); Octopath Traveler (Switch); The Quiet Man (PC / PS4); Shadow of the Tomb Raider (PC / PS4 / Xbox One); The World Ends with You: Final Remix (Switch); Starbreeze Studios: Overkill's The Walking Dead (PC / PS4 / Xbox One); Stardock: Star Control: Origins (PC); Studio Wildcard: Ark: Survival Evolved (Switch); Survios: Creed: Rise to Glory (HTC Vive / Oculus Rift / PSVR); Team17: Genesis Alpha One (PC / PS4 / Xbox One); Mugsters (PC / PS4 / Switch / Xbox One); My Time at Portia (PC / PS4 / Switch / Xbox One); Overcooked 2 (PC / PS4 / Switch / Xbox One); Planet Alpha (PC / PS4 / Switch / Xbox One); Team Cherry: Hollow Knight (Switch); Techland: Dying Light 2 (PC / PS4 / Xbox One); Telltale Games: The Walking Dead: The Final Season (PC / PS4 / Switch / Xbox One); Tencent Games: Arena of Valor (Switch); tinyBuild: Secret Neighbor (PC); Tripwire Interactive: Killing Floor 2 (PC); Maneater (PC); Ubisoft: Assassin's Creed Odyssey (PC / PS4 / Xbox One); Beyond Good and Evil 2 (TBA); The Crew 2 (PC / PS4 / Xbox One); For Honor: Marching Fire (PC / PS4 / Xbox One) DLC; Just Dance 2019 (PS4 / Wii / Wii U / Switch / Xbox 360 / Xbox One); Mario + Rabbids Kingdom Battle: Donkey Kong Adventure (Switch) DLC; Skull & Bones (PC / PS4 / Xbox One); Starlink: Battle for Atlas (PS4 / Switch / Xbox One); Tom Clancy's The Division 2 (TBA); Transference (PC / PS4 / Xbox One); Trials Rising (PC / PS4 / Switch / Xbox One); Warner Bros. Interactive Entertainment: Hitman 2 (PC / PS4 / Xbox One); Lego DC Super-Villains (PC / PS4 / Xbox One / Switch); Lego The Incredibles (PC / PS4 / Xbox One / Switch); Xseed Games: Fate/Extella Link (PS4 / PSV); Freedom Planet (Switch); Gal Metal (Switch); Gungrave VR (PSVR); Sakuna: Of Rice and Ruin (PC / PS4); Senran Kagura Burst Re:Newal (PC / PS4)
