= Babylon's Fall =

2022 video game

- Developer: PlatinumGames
- Publisher: Square Enix
- Directors: Kenji Saito; Takahisa Sugiyama
- Producers: Junichi Ehara; Yosuke Saito
- Designers: Isao Negishi; Kazuma Fujii
- Artist: Kouji Tajima
- Writer: Kenichi Iwao
- Composer: Hiroshi Yamaguchi
- Platforms: PlayStation 4; PlayStation 5; Windows
- Release: March 3, 2022
- Genres: Action role-playing, hack and slash
- Modes: Single-player, multiplayer

Babylon's Fall (Note: Japanese: バビロンズフォール, Hepburn: Babironzu Fōru) was an action role-playing game developed by PlatinumGames and published by Square Enix. The game was released for PlayStation 4, PlayStation 5, and Windows on March 3, 2022.

It received generally negative reviews from critics, and was a significant commercial failure for Square Enix, with the game only reaching a concurrent player count of less than 1,200 just after release day on the Steam platform and declining sharply afterwards. Six months after the game's release, Square Enix announced that they would be ceasing support of the game's servers, which later shut down less than a year following its release, on February 27, 2023.

== Gameplay ==
Babylon's Fall was an action role-playing hack and slash video game played from a third-person perspective. The player assumed control of a Sentinel, who must scale a massive tower known as the Ziggurat. Players started at a hub area known as Sentinel Force HQ where they could interact with other players, visit shops or blacksmiths to purchase gear and upgrades, and access quests. Each quest could be played solo, though the game also supported four-player cooperative multiplayer. Players ascended three to four floors in each quest until they reached the summit of the tower. Along the way, players would unlock loot which could be used to enhance the strength of the characters.

Each sentinel was equipped with two weapons. However, the player was also equipped with a device known as Gideon's Coffin. The coffin allowed players to carry two more spectral weapons. These weapons could no longer be used once the spectral energy bar is depleted, though it would gradually refill over time. The game featured several types of melee and ranged weapons. At the end of each level, players would be awarded with loot and gear. The quality of the gear depended on the player's performance in a level. Players could achieve better performance by varying their attack style, eliminating enemies quickly, and dodging attacks.

== Plot ==
Set in a fantasy world, the story of Babylon's Fall was split into three quests.

=== Liberator ===
Prisoners are taken on board from a ship, where following a guard, become tested for the Gideon Coffin. Out of the many prisoners, only three of them managed to survive its installation and are then promoted as Sentinels. On their first battle, they fight blue forces known as Gallu, where upon facing their first large force, a character named Arwia appears and unlocks their Gideon Coffin, allowing them to fight. Their main goal is to stop the plague which is being caused by the Blue Sun (which is an alien deity named Nergal). Bosses such as Zenon, Lord Bemus, Moira and Galenos with his giant dragon Antares stand in the way. At the end of the Liberator quest, the player and Arwia defeat Nergal.

=== Resurgence ===
Released on March 22, 2022, Resurgence focused on three factions struggling to win the Sentinel civil war: Sophia's Sentinels (the player, Sylvie, Sophia and Eleon), Gallagher's The Creatures (alongside Elpis, Zogh, Lawi-Ghor and various dragons) and Urom-Baggel's Molzamites (alongside Ogo-Tallwa, and some unnamed Molzamites). It ended with most of The Creatures and Molzamites being murdered by the player as Urom-Baggel and Gallagher escape.

=== Tale of Two Ziggurats ===
The final quest released on May 31, 2022, as part of the update titled "The Light of Auru", the Tale of Two Ziggurats, served as the conclusion to the Bablylon's Fall story. The final fates of several characters were revealed as Gallagher kills Eleon, the player kills Gallagher out of revenge, and Urom-Baggel is defeated. While the plot focused on the new Kuftaali faction who is seeking help from the player to stop the new plague, the ending showed a Kuftaali character named Shamilka being revealed to be the true final boss of the game known as Ereshkigal (who is of the same alien deity race as Nergal). The game ended with the player killing Ereshkigal, permanently ending the plague.

== Development ==
Babylon's Fall was developed by PlatinumGames. According to producer Junichi Ehara, the team wanted to expand on the combat system of Nier: Automata and experiment with multiplayer with Babylon's Fall. The game's brushstroke visual art-style was inspired by classic European oil paintings, and the graphics were created using canvas-like texture. The game also borrowed assets from Final Fantasy XIV, a massively multiplayer online video game created by publisher Square Enix. The protagonist of the story was compared to a Roman gladiator by scenario writer Kenichi Iwao. The first closed beta was held in July 2021 in Japan and August 2021 in Europe and North America. The beta received a lukewarm reception, with players complaining about the game's illegible visual style. The development team evaluated players' feedback and adjusted the game's graphics to ensure that they were less blurry and pixelated.

Production on the game began in 2017, around the time of Nier: Automata's release. The game was revealed at E3 2018 during Square Enix's own press conference and was originally slated to release in 2019. The first look at gameplay would be seen at Sony's December 2019 State of Play presentation. It was shown again at E3 2021, now labeled a "game as a service". This means that the game would be supported with free updates, new gameplay modes and content upon release. PlatinumGames opened a new Tokyo studio in 2020 to help the studio make live service games. The developers have stated that the game was always envisioned as a multiplayer, live service title, and expressed regret over some players having the false impression that it was a single player game because of previous footage only showing solo combat. One of the game's directors, Takahisa Sugiyama, stated that the challenge of creating an online, live-service game was "a lot harder to do than we thought". This, along with the impact of the COVID-19 pandemic and the release of new hardware, are cited as reasons for the game's lengthy delay.

The game was released on March 3, 2022, for PlayStation 4, PlayStation 5 and Windows, with cross-platform play support. Players who purchased the game's Digital Deluxe version could access the game on February 28, 2022. In September 2022, PlatinumGames and Square Enix announced further development and updates on the game would cease. On February 27, 2023, Babylon's Fall was shut down.

== Reception ==
Reception

Aggregate scores
Aggregator	Score
Metacritic	PC: 46/100; PS5: 41/100
OpenCritic	3% recommend

Review scores
Publication	Score
Destructoid	5/10
Famitsu	30/40
Hardcore Gamer	1.5/5
IGN	4/10
Jeuxvideo.com	12/20
PC Gamer (US)	45/100
PC Games (DE)	5/10
Push Square	3/10
Shacknews	5/10
The Games Machine (Italy)	5.8/10
Video Games Chronicle	1/5

Babylon's Fall received "generally unfavorable" reviews according to review aggregator website Metacritic, which listed Babylon's Fall as the third-worst game of 2022. Fellow review aggregator OpenCritic assessed that the game received weak approval, being recommended by 3% of critics.

Destructoid liked the combat, praising the "coffin combos" and "slick" dodges, but felt the actual structure of the game was boring; "most of the challenges are the same hallways, remixed, and the same enemies, slightly tweaked". Rock Paper Shotgun disliked the progression of the game, writing that it was needlessly confusing; "You rush through corridors and into progressively harder arenas... Occasionally there are yellow orbs to collect on your way, although I haven't been told what these do. Beat an arena and the game will give you a rank, like Stone or Bronze or Pure Platinum, which also nets you... nothing?"

=== Sales ===
On Steam, Babylon's Fall had an all-time high of 1,188 concurrent players on March 4, 2022, which fell to just one player in May 2022.

In Japan, the PlayStation 4 physical version sold 2,885 units within its first week of release, making it the twenty-fourth best-selling retail game of the week in the country. The PlayStation 5 physical version sold 2,224 units in the country during the same week, making it the twenty-seventh best-selling retail game of the week in the country.
