= Daemon X Machina: Titanic Scion =

2025 video game

- Developer: Marvelous First Studio
- Publishers: WW: Marvelous; WW: Xseed Games (Windows)
- Director: Ken Awata
- Producer: Kenichiro Tsukuda
- Designer: Noriaki Maruyama
- Artists: Shōji Kawamori; Kimihiko Fujisaka; Kazuma Koda
- Writer: Kenichiro Tsukuda
- Composers: Junichi Nakatsuru; Rio Hamamoto
- Platforms: Nintendo Switch 2; PlayStation 5; Windows; Xbox Series X/S
- Release: September 5, 2025
- Genres: Action, third-person shooter
- Modes: Single-player, multiplayer

Daemon X Machina: Titanic Scion is a 2025 action game developed and published by Marvelous for Nintendo Switch 2, PlayStation 5, Windows and Xbox Series X/S. It is the sequel of Daemon X Machina. The game released on September 5, 2025. It was considered a significant sales disappointment by Marvelous.

== Gameplay ==
In the game, the player controls a custom character, who commands an Arsenal mech and engages in battle with other mech enemies. The player avatar's stats, abilities, and appearance can be customized in the Hangar, which serves as the game's main hub. The Hangar is also the area where players create their custom Arsenal using body parts bought or collected throughout the game. It is also the place where players browse through different missions for both single player and online cooperative multiplayer.

== Development and release ==
In September 2021, Kenichiro Tsukuda confirmed a sequel was in the works on a livestream marking the game's second anniversary. Its title, Daemon X Machina: Titanic Scion, was announced during the Marvelous Game Showcase in May 2023. Titanic Scion was released on September 5, 2025 for Nintendo Switch 2, PlayStation 5, Windows, and Xbox Series X/S.

== Reception ==
Reception

Aggregate scores
| Aggregator | Score |
|---|---|
| Metacritic | NS2: 69/100; PC: 79/100 |
| OpenCritic | 44% recommend (Note: Based on 71 reviews) |

Daemon X Machina: Titanic Scion received "mixed or average" reviews on Nintendo Switch 2, and "generally favorable" reviews on PlayStation 5 according to review aggregator Metacritic.
