= Way To The Woods =

Upcoming video game

- Developer: OnePixel.Dog
- Publisher: OnePixel.Dog
- Platform: Windows
- Genre: Adventure
- Mode: Single-player

Way To The Woods (Note: The game's title is sometimes capitalized as Way to the Woods. This article uses the title as capitalized on the video game Web site and on Steam.) is an upcoming adventure video game developed by the Australian studio OnePixel.Dog.

== Development ==
Way To The Woods is developed by OnePixel.Dog, the independent studio of Anthony Tan, a solo-developer and artist based in Melbourne, Australia. The game first gained public attention in December 2015, when Tan, then 16 years old, shared early concept renders on Reddit. The post gained additional visibility after being shared on Twitter by Sean Murray, co-founder of Hello Games, the studio behind No Man's Sky. At the time of the post, Tan had not yet established a plot, story or gameplay loop, only the following premise: "Players would navigate the deer through a three-dimensional world devoid of human life, solving puzzles by capturing light in the larger animal’s antlers and using it to clear away shadow." The post also caught the attention of indie publisher Team17 and by January 2016, Tan had secured a publishing deal with the company. In March 2016, Tan received funding from Epic Games' Unreal Dev Grants.

In March 2018, an announcement trailer was released, indicating an expected launch date in early 2019; however, this release window was subsequently missed. A second trailer premiered in June 2019 during the Microsoft's press conference at E3 2019, this time projecting a 2020 release, which was also not met. While working on the second trailer in early 2019, Tan experienced the deaths of both his father and a friend. These events left him feeling "paralyzed" and aware of his own mortality, leading him to question whether he should actually complete the game. Ultimately, these events led Tan to think about what the message of the game should be and in 2020, he then wrote the entire story. A third trailer, released in December 2022, announced a new release window of March 2023 for PC and Xbox. This date too was not met. Since then no updated release date has been provided.
