= Ghost Giant =

2019 puzzle video game

- Developer: Zoink
- Publisher: Zoink
- Director: Olov Redmalm
- Artist: Olov Redmalm
- Writer: Sara Bergmark Elfgren
- Platforms: PlayStation 4 Oculus Quest
- Release: PlayStation VR; April 19, 2019; Oculus Quest; February 20, 2020
- Genres: Puzzle, adventure
- Mode: Single-player

Ghost Giant is a virtual reality puzzle game developed and published by Zoink for the PlayStation 4 through PlayStation VR and Oculus Quest. It was released for PlayStation VR in April 2019 and Oculus Quest in February 2020.

== Gameplay ==
In the game, the player assumes control of the titular Ghost Giant. The Giant is tasked to assist a young boy named Louis by manipulating the game's world, lifting items and solving puzzles. Players can also explore the world of Sancourt and interact with various non-playable characters living in the city. For instance, players can use the PlayStation Move controller to rotate houses and discover what can be found inside.

== Development ==
The studio worked with Swedish writer Sara Bergmark Elfgren to create the story. The main theme is friendship, as the player needs to become a "supporting friend" for Louis as they helped him solve various problems and puzzles in the game. The game took 18 months to develop, and the team drew inspirations from homemade toys, such as miniature cardboard towns, when they were creating the game. Announced during Sony's E3 2018 press conference, the game was released digitally on April 19, 2019 for the PlayStation VR headset, while the retail release, handled by Perp Games, was released on May 7. In November 2019, Zoink announced that it would be coming to Oculus Quest in December the same year, though it was subsequently delayed to February 20, 2020.

== Reception ==
Reception

Aggregate score
Aggregator	Score
Metacritic	(PS4) 80/100 (PC) 85/100

Review scores
Publication	Score
Adventure Gamers	4/5
Destructoid	7/10
IGN	8.3/10
Push Square	9/10

The game received generally positive reviews upon releases, according to review aggregator platform Metacritic.

Mike Epstein from IGN described the story as "charming", though he felt that some of the puzzles were too simple. Rich Meister of Destructoid stated that Ghost Giant "feels like a VR advancement of a classic PC point-and-click adventure game, albeit one with a great look, phenomenal sound design". He also enjoyed the story, though he noted its short length. UploadVR praised the game's handling of depression and neglect, writing "Louis may be an animal, but the developer's sensitive handling of these subjects gives him remarkable humanity". Liam Croft of Push Square noted that the game "belong[ed] in the conversation for the very best PSVR game", writing, "Its utterly phenomenal series of scenes will live long in the memory, complemented by a narrative that demands immediate investment...Outstanding presentation that rewards exploration is the cherry on top of a title we won't be forgetting about any time soon." Pascal Tekaia of Adventure Gamers gave the game 4 stars out of 5, stating, "The game doesn't revolutionize the virtual reality medium, but it throws players into a well-realized, charming world with simple yet satisfying gameplay and a surprisingly emotional tale."
