= Command & Conquer: Rivals =

2018 video game

Command and Conquer: Rivals
- Developer: EA Redwood Studios
- Publisher: Electronic Arts
- Designer: Greg Black
- Series: Command & Conquer
- Platforms: Android, iOS
- Release: 4 December 2018
- Genre: Real-time strategy
- Mode: Multiplayer

Command & Conquer: Rivals is a free-to-play real-time strategy mobile game. The game was released on Android and iOS on December 4, 2018.

== Gameplay ==
Screenshot Gameplay of Command and Conquer: Rivals

Command and Conquer: Rivals is a one-versus-one competitive multiplayer real-time strategy game. The player can play as GDI or Brotherhood of Nod, with each faction offering unique abilities, and units. Players are tasked to control platforms surrounding the missile silo. If the player manages to gain control of more platforms than the enemy for a fixed time, the missile will launch and obliterate the opponent's base.

== Development ==
The game was revealed at EA Play 2018 with a live gameplay demo, making it the first Command & Conquer game from EA since 2012's Command & Conquer: Tiberium Alliances. A pre-alpha version of the game was released on Google Play on the same day. Greg Black, who had worked on various Command & Conquer games, was hired to design the game's combat.

== Reception ==
Reception

Aggregate score
Aggregator	Score
Metacritic	71/100

Command and Conquer: Rivals was widely criticized by players for being a mobile game instead of a real-time strategy game the franchise is known for. Redwood Studios General Manager Michael Martinez responded by saying that the team hoped to bring a great real-time strategy game for mobile platforms. He also urged fans of the series to give this game a chance.

Rivals received mixed reception from critics. On Metacritic, the game has a score of 71/100.

Rivals was nominated for "Song/Score - Mobile Video Game" at the Hollywood Music in Media Awards.
