= Roller Champions =

2022 video game

- Developer(s): Ubisoft Montreal
- Publisher(s): Ubisoft
- Engine: Unity
- Platform(s): Microsoft Windows; PlayStation 4; Xbox One; Nintendo Switch
- Release: Windows, PS4, Xbox One; May 25, 2022; Nintendo Switch; June 21, 2022
- Genre(s): Sports
- Mode(s): Multiplayer

Roller Champions is a free-to-play sports video game developed by Ubisoft Montreal and published by Ubisoft. It was released on May 25, 2022 for Microsoft Windows, PlayStation 4 and Xbox One, and for Nintendo Switch on June 21, 2022.

== Gameplay ==
Roller Champions is a 3v3 competitive multiplayer sports game played from a third-person perspective. The track has four gates, with a net next to each one. The game starts with the ball dropping from one of them. Players can grab the ball, throw it, and pass it to their teammates, as well as tackle their opponents and jump.

To unlock the net, the team must go through all four gates while in possession of the ball. If the opposing team takes possession of the ball for any reason, all the gates are reset. Once the net is unlocked, the team in possession of the ball can shoot into it to score points.

Shooting the ball into the net on the first lap is worth one point. If the team goes through all four gates for a second lap without being intercepted, they can score three points upon a successful shot into the net. If the team completes a third lap, they can score five points. To win the game, the team must either score five points before the timer of 7 minutes runs out or score more points than the other team once the timer elapses.

At the end of each match, participating players gain “fans” that can be used to advance through the roller pass tiers to gain cosmetic items and unlock new arenas.

== Development ==
Ubisoft officially announced the game during their press conference at E3 2019. A pre-alpha demo was available via Uplay from June 10 to June 14.

In a developer stream, Ubisoft confirmed that the game is in development for Microsoft Windows, Nintendo Switch, PlayStation 4, and Xbox One and mobile devices as well. The game was stated to be set for originally release in early 2021, though it was subsequently delayed to May 25, 2022 for Windows, PlayStation 4, and Xbox One, with the Nintendo Switch version being delayed to June 21, 2022.

== Reception ==
Reception

Aggregate score
Aggregator	Score
Metacritic	(PC) 69/100 (PS4) 66/100 (XONE) 61/100

Review scores
Publication	Score
GameSpot	6/10
Jeuxvideo.com	14/20
Nintendo Life	4/10
Shacknews	7/10

Roller Champions received "mixed or average" reviews, according to review aggregator Metacritic.

Ozzie Mejia of Shacknews gave Roller Champions a 7 out of 10 and praised the accessible core experience, crossplay, fast-paced sessions, arena design, and spectator options while criticizing the lack of character customization options, game modes, interesting character models, and long-term engaging gameplay. Jordan Ramée of GameSpot thought positively of the approachable movement mechanics, sense of speed, and incentive to progress, but felt that the skill ceiling was short, the matches were repetitive, and that the multiplayer communication features were lacking.
