= Tom Clancy's Ghost Recon Breakpoint =

2019 video game

- Cover art featuring Nomad, the playable protagonist, carrying wounded squadmate Vasily
- Developer: Ubisoft Paris (Note: Additional work by Ubisoft Bucharest, Ubisoft Kyiv, Ubisoft Montpellier, Ubisoft Odessa, Ubisoft Bordeaux, Ubisoft Milan and Ubisoft Belgrade)
- Publisher: Ubisoft
- Director: Eric Couzian
- Producer: Nouredine Abboud
- Writers: Emil Daubon; David Gallaher
- Composers: Alain Johannes; Alessandro Cortini
- Series: Tom Clancy's Ghost Recon
- Engine: AnvilNext 2.0
- Platforms: PlayStation 4 Windows; Xbox One; Stadia
- Release: 4 October 2019
- Genre: Tactical shooter
- Modes: Single-player, multiplayer

Tom Clancy's Ghost Recon Breakpoint is an online tactical shooter video game developed by Ubisoft Paris and published by Ubisoft. The game was released worldwide on 4 October 2019 for PlayStation 4, Windows, and Xbox One, and on 18 December 2019 for Stadia. The game is the eleventh installment in the Tom Clancy's Ghost Recon franchise and is a narrative sequel to the 2017 video game Tom Clancy's Ghost Recon Wildlands.

The game is set in an open world environment called Auroa, a fictional island chain in the Pacific Ocean. The player takes on the role of Lieutenant Colonel Anthony "Nomad" Perryman, a U.S. Special Operation Forces service member sent to the island to investigate a series of disturbances involving Skell Technology, a military contractor based on Auroa.

Upon release, Tom Clancy's Ghost Recon Breakpoint received mixed reviews from critics, with criticism for its mechanics and mission design. The game failed to meet sales expectations and therefore was a commercial disappointment. Live service support for the game ended on 5 April 2022 shortly after Ubisoft added non-fungible tokens (NFTs) to the game.

== Gameplay ==
Breakpoint is set in an open world named Auroa which can be freely explored by players.

Like its predecessor Wildlands, Breakpoint is a tactical shooter game set in an open world environment. It is played from a third-person perspective and uses an optional first-person view for aiming weapons. Players take on the role of Lieutenant Colonel Anthony "Nomad" Perryman, a member of the Delta Company, First Battalion, 5th Special Forces Group, also known as "Ghosts", a fictional elite special operations unit of the United States Army under the Joint Special Operations Command. The game world, Auroa, is an open world environment that features a variety of landscapes, and these can be used for tactical advantages. For instance, players can slide down rocky terrain and use mud to camouflage themselves. According to Ubisoft, Auroa is larger than the game world featured in Wildlands. Players have a variety of ways to traverse the open world, controlling various air, land and sea vehicles.

The game was planned to launch with four character classes. Ubisoft announced plans to make more classes available through post-launch updates. Each class has its own abilities; for example, the panther is a class oriented towards stealth and is able to throw smoke bombs. The player is able to switch between classes in-game. Players have to gather intelligence to progress through the game and can use a variety of methods to approach missions. As in previous titles in the franchise, they can utilize a variety of weapons in combat, with the player's repertoire expanded to include combat drones and rocket launchers to kill enemies. Alternatively, the player can use stealth to silently neutralize opponents. In Breakpoint, players can equip a variety of new weapons and gear such as a blowtorch to cut through fences, sulphur gas grenades to kill enemies, and electromagnetic pulse grenades to disable drones and vehicles. Players can carry corpses away and hide them so that enemies will not become alerted. Fallen enemies will leave loot for players to collect. Fallen teammates can be carried away so as to revive them safely. Many of the new features added to Breakpoint were developed based on player feedback in Wildlands.

The game places a larger emphasis on survival than Wildlands. Enemies are more numerous and the game features a wider range of enemy archetypes. These enemies have access to many of the same weapons, skills and equipment that are available to the player. Enemies will respond more realistically to player actions and patrols wander the game world searching for the player. Ubisoft introduced these changes to give the player the sense that they were "no longer the most dangerous thing in the game world". Players need to collect different resources in the game's world and use them to craft resources such as bandages or grenades. Regular loadout checks are necessary to progress the players Gear Level, and the player will need to manage their character's fatigue, injuries, and ration usage. Failing to do so may slow the player down, limit their ability to regenerate health, or cause them to make more noise while moving. The game uses a regenerative health system whereby the player character naturally recovers health, but serious injuries will impede the player character's performance, as they will start limping and can no longer aim their weapon accurately. Players can set up a bivouac shelter to heal themselves. The shelter is the site where players can manage their weapons and inventory, customize their character and change the character's classes. The game can be played with up to three other players cooperatively, or in single-player. The game was initially announced to have no artificial intelligence (AI) squadmates, but the addition of AI squadmates was later amended as post-release content based due to negative feedback from players. Unlike previous Ghost Recon titles, Breakpoint requires a constant internet connection to play, in-part due to the game's single-character progression system.

The game's story features dialogue choices. These will not affect the main narrative, but instead enable players to gain intelligence that may aid in their missions. The game features a mode called "Exploration" that was used in Assassin's Creed Odyssey. Unlike most open-world games where the player is given an objective marker to guide their progress, Breakpoint's Exploration mode gives the player a rough approximation of the area where an objective may be located. Their approximation can be refined by exploring the world or through investigating intelligence. A competitive multiplayer mode was released at launch, and end-of-game content such as raids was introduced after release.

== Plot ==
=== Setting and characters ===
The game is set in the then-future year of 2025, six years after the events of Wildlands and one year after the events of Future Soldier. The story takes place on Auroa, a fictional island in the South Pacific owned by a billionaire entrepreneur and philanthropist named Jace Skell (Rodney Mullen). Skell is the founder of Skell Technology, a blue chip company producing drones for commercial applications, but the company has also found success as a military contractor developing cutting-edge equipment for the United States government. Skell purchased Auroa with a vision of turning it into a hub for the design, research, development, and production of artificial intelligence and drone technology, which he dubs "World 2.0". The island is made up of a series of individual biomes including marine estuaries and wetlands, fjords, arboreal forests, snow-capped mountains, and active volcanoes.

The main antagonist is former Ghost Lieutenant Colonel Cole D. Walker (Jon Bernthal), who has gone rogue after leaving the army. After witnessing the slaughter of his fireteam on a mission in Bolivia, (Note: As depicted in the Ghost Recon Wildlands DLC event Operation Oracle) Walker has come to realize that the United States government does not value the lives of its soldiers. A private military contractor named Sentinel has occupied the island under Walker's command while Walker himself is leading a team of rogue soldiers calling themselves the "Wolves".

Returning characters from Ghost Recon Wildlands include the members of Nomad's fireteam Dominic "Holt" Moretta, Corey "Weaver" Ward and Rubio "Midas" Delgado.

=== Story ===
Prior to the events of the game, Skell Technology comes under increasing public scrutiny when they are faced with mounting evidence that its products are being used by corrupt regimes. The situation escalates further when the USS Seay, an American cargo ship, sinks off the coast of the Auroa archipelago, and the island chain cuts all communication to the outside world. In response, CIA Deputy Director Peter Miles initiates Operation Greenstone, deploying a Ghost Recon platoon to re-establish contact with Auroa and determine the circumstances of the sinking. The insertion ends in disaster when the helicopters carrying the platoon to the island are taken down by a swarm of drones.

Nomad survives the crash but is separated from his squad. Midas is missing in action, Holt is crippled, and Weaver is executed by Cole Walker, a former Ghost-turned-leader of an elite paramilitary group called the "Wolves". After forming a new Ghost team consisting stealth specialist Fury, combat engineer Fixit, and the sharpshooter Vasily, Nomad gets in contact with Mads Schulz, an ex-United States Marine and de facto leader of the homesteaders who lived on Auroa before Skell Tech's arrival. Mads reveals that the homesteaders were forced into hiding by a private military company employed by Skell Tech called Sentinel, who had been hired for security following a terrorist bombing on the island, but has now overthrown Skell Tech and declared martial law over the archipelago. Nomad meets Josiah Hill, another Ghost survivor with whom he and Walker have history: the three were part of a mission in the Middle East, which ended in disaster when Walker executed their commanding officer for murdering a civilian. After the mission Walker resigned from the Army and disappeared. Nomad encounters Skell's chief mathematician Maurice Fox and his daughter, Harmony, and discovers that all of Auroa is surrounded by a massive network of drones that prevents anyone from entering or leaving.

After determining that Skell Tech CEO Jace Skell, who disappeared shortly after Sentinel's coup, is the only one who can lift the drone perimeter, Nomad seeks him out. Upon reaching Skell, Nomad discovers that Hill has been secretly working with Walker and the two offer Nomad a place by their side. Nomad refuses and takes Skell to the homesteaders, where he admits he ordered the sinking of the Seay to stop the ship from carrying dangerous technology off the island, and shows Nomad video footage in which Walker and Trey Stone, the founder and owner of Sentinel, discuss a project codenamed "Wonderland". Skell says that he will be able to hack one of the pylons that controls the drone perimeter, but needs the assistance of several Skell Tech colleagues who are scattered around the archipelago.

During the search for one of the employees, Nomad reaches out to the Outcasts, a group of former Skell Tech employees who quit Skell Tech and formed a resistance group in opposition to Skell's increasing interests in transhumanism, led by Haruhi Ito and her brother Daigoroh. While assisting one of Skell's colleagues, Nomad discovers Haruhi and Daigoroh were responsible for the Skell Tech bombing; they had intended only to damage the building as a protest against Skell's transhumanist projects, but they were not aware the building was occupied and had underestimated the explosive power of their bomb. Nomad berates them for their recklessness, but continues working with them after recovering Skell's colleague.

Maurice reveals the identity of a mole in Skell Tech who had been assisting him and attempts to meet her, but he is killed by the Wolves and the mole is kidnapped. Nomad rescues her, killing Hill in the process, and continues to investigate the Wolves' activities. Nomad discovers that Walker's "Wonderland" project is an operation to use a submarine outfitted with drone-equipped torpedoes to assassinate key national figures, in hopes of triggering a third world war as a way of "cleaning" the world and ridding it of corruption. After finding and killing Walker, Nomad assists Skell in hacking the drone pylon, using the drones to destroy Walker's submarine before it departs.

In the wake of Walker's death, Stone consolidates his power over Auroa, Skell Tech, and Sentinel. Nomad is congratulated by Mads and the homesteaders for thwarting the Wonderland scheme, but acknowledges that his work on Auroa is not finished. Skell observes the drone swarm above Auroa acting strangely, commenting that the hacked pylon appears to have developed emergent behavior.

=== Post-launch content ===
==== Project Titan ====
Nomad's team is deployed to Golem Island, a remote volcanic island northeast of the Auroa archipelago, where a sub-faction of the Wolves, known as "Red Wolves", has taken over Skell Tech's facilities and gained control of their artificial intelligence technology. Nomad is tasked with destroying Skell Tech's "Titan" drones and preventing the Red Wolves from manufacturing more.

==== Terminator (Note: Due to an expiration in licensing rights with 20th Century Studios, the content is no longer available as of January 2023.) ====
Nomad is tasked by Maria Schulz to locate a woman in Sentinel detention that managed to take down several armed drones on her own. Nomad tracks down the woman who identifies herself as Rasa Aldwin, a time traveler sent from the future to search for Nomad. However, as she explains her situation, a T-800 Terminator manages to track their location and they are forced to escape. Making their way to Rasa's workshop, she explains that forty years from now in her timeline, an artificial intelligence known as Skynet would be responsible for developing the machines for infiltration-based assassination missions, and would use the machines to wage war on humanity. At the hideout, Rasa provides Nomad with a rifle specifically designed to destroy the machines and tasks him to investigate the unexplained presence of multiple Terminators on Auroa, and what their true purpose is for being on the island. After detecting strange electromagnetic patterns coming from one of the Skell Tech facilities, Nomad discovers that the machines have converted the facility into a factory to begin mass-producing Terminators in the present. Reaching the control room, Nomad comes across the T-800 that was originally encountered in the first mission and is now in control of the facility. After battling and destroying the T-800, Nomad seals the airlock leading into the production facility as it self-destructs; trapping the remaining Terminators inside. With all remaining Terminators on Auroa destroyed, and the threat posed by Skynet now abated, Rasa chooses to stay in the present with the Auroa homesteaders.

==== Deep State ====
Operative Sam Fisher is deployed to Auroa alongside his friend Victor Coste, under the guise of working for the latter's private security company, Paladin 9. While Coste is ostensibly working alongside Sentinel to provide logistical support, the duo are actually investigating the kidnappings of military specialists that are traced back to an individual on the island known as "The Strategist." Fisher and Nomad decide to team up when it is discovered that Midas is alive and is being held by the Strategist for a top-secret program known as Project CLAW; an artificial intelligence hive mind that enables human-controlled drone swarms that can be used for military applications. After making contact with and enlisting the help of system analyst Hollie Mackenzie, entomologist Willem Van Dyke, patent legal advisor Stephanie Burgess, Wolves defector and former Bodark operative Karel Sekulic, and former US Army general Reggie Paxton, Nomad and Fisher discover that The Strategist is Leon Fairrow, a billionaire industrialist and head of weapons manufacturing conglomerate Lomax-Fairrow. Fairrow and his partner, US Senator Michael Lomax are part of a conspiracy that involves high-ranking members of various US government agencies and private development firms to create the drones. Fearing that Fairrow was not reliable and concerned about the kidnappings, the CIA and the Department of Defense had asked Fourth Echelon to investigate. After infiltrating Project CLAW's research facility and facing off against an array of drones, Fisher and Nomad manage to capture Fairrow and rescue Midas, who is evacuated to the homesteaders' base to recover with Holt. Meanwhile, using a short window provided by Mackenzie in the drone swarm that is protecting the island, Fisher and Coste manage to evacuate onboard the C-147B Paladin with Fairrow in-tow and force him to testify before Congress; in the hopes that his testimony will convince them to officially launch a US military invasion of Auroa to remove Sentinel from the archipelago.

==== Red Patriot ====
Ghosts commander Scott Mitchell informs Nomad that, in the wake of Wonderland's and Project CLAW's failure, Trey Stone has aligned himself, along with Sentinel and the Wolves with remnants of the Raven's Rock and Bodark. (Note: Raven's Rock and Bodark are both antagonistic factions previously featured in Tom Clancy's Ghost Recon: Future Soldier (2012)) With Raven's Rock's help, Stone intends to launch a massive attack on the United States called "Operation Kingmaker", in which he will utilize drones loaded with chemical weapons provided by Bodark to conduct a mass assassination of U.S. officials, allowing Kingmaker's designated survivor to take control of the American government. Mitchell tasks Nomad with hunting down and eliminating Stone's allies and destroying key components of Kingmaker to thwart the attack. After Nomad has dealt with Bodark, he tracks Stone to a Skell Tech factory, where Stone reveals he intends to launch the chemical weapon drones against the entire Auroa archipelago in revenge for the Ghosts thwarting his plans. With the assistance of the Outcasts and Haruhi Ito, Nomad is able to stop Stone, killing him and destroying the drones before they can activate.

==== Amber Sky ====
Rainbow Six operatives Eliza "Ash" Cohen, Lera "Finka" Melnikova, Mike "Thatcher" Baker, and Liu Tze "Lesion" Long are deployed to Auroa, where they join the Ghosts to stop Sentinel from producing and selling a toxic chemical gas called Amber Ruin.

==== Operation Motherland ====
Nomad is reunited with his previous CIA handler, Karen Bowman, who is deployed by the CIA to Auroa after the collapse of Sentinel Corp and the Wolves has resulted in renewed interest in the island and its technologies by foreign powers. To mitigate the imminent global crisis, Bowman has been directed to ensure the stewardship of Auroa is handed over to The Outcasts, led by Haruhi Ito, in order to ensure that Auroa becomes a sovereign ally of the United States. As such, Nomad and the Ghosts are tasked with supporting the Outcasts by eliminating the last remaining pockets of enemy resistance across the island via the new conquest mode. To resist the Ghosts, the remnants of Sentinel and the Wolves have subsequently called upon reinforcements in the form of Bodark.

== Development ==
Following the success of Wildlands, the development team expanded to more than one thousand people. For the first time in the series, the setting is fictional as the team felt that they would have more creative freedom regarding the game's world design. The development team created a backstory for the Auroa archipelago dating back eighty million years to make the setting feel more realistic. The game world itself was created through procedural generation with some areas developed from the ground up. An archipelago was chosen for the game's setting as it would make it easier for the developers to add post-game content by adding additional islands and open up new regions for exploration. The development team listened to players' feedback from Wildlands and introduced a variety of changes players had requested, such as an increased focus on realism and improved vehicle control.

The game's premise of the Ghosts being hunted and alone on the island caused Ubisoft to remove AI companions from the game, which were later implemented in 2020. According to executive producer Nouredine Abboud, Jon Bernthal was hired to voice and provide motion capture for the game's antagonist because the team felt that he had the potential to be a charismatic villain and an effective nemesis for the Ghosts. The name of the game, Breakpoint, reflects the game's narrative in which the Ghosts are on a mission which is on the brink of failure. Emil Daubon, the game's writer, added that the story would explore the themes of "pain, trauma, brotherhood, and mental exhaustion".

After the game's release and in response to its poor critical reception, Ubisoft announced plans to rework Breakpoint with the introduction of "the Ghost Experience". The Ghost Experience allows players the option to disable some game mechanics, such as the gear score, and independently alter others.

Live service support for the game ended on 5 April 2022 shortly after Ubisoft added non-fungible tokens (NFTs) to the game.

== Release ==
=== Marketing ===
Ubisoft released a downloadable content (DLC) chapter for Wildlands titled Operation Oracle that introduced the character of Cole D. Walker and focused on Skell Technology. Breakpoint was released for PlayStation 4, Windows, and Xbox One on 4 October 2019. Two DLC chapters, Deep State and Transcendence, were set to be released following the game's launch. While Deep State was released on 24 March 2020, Transcendence was replaced by the DLC Red Patriot, which was released on 15 September 2020. Ubisoft also announced at E3 2019 that the game would feature a Terminator-themed crossover as part of its DLC schedule.

The Operation Motherland update features a crossover with the Tomb Raider franchise to celebrate its 25th anniversary, wherein Breakpoint players can complete a 'Relics of the Ancients' treasure hunt for Tomb Raider-themed rewards.

== Reception ==
Reception

Aggregate score
| Aggregator | Score |
|---|---|
| Metacritic | (PC) 58/100 (PS4) 56/100 (XONE) 62/100 |

Review scores
| Publication | Score |
|---|---|
| Destructoid | 3/10 |
| Edge | 4/10 |
| Electronic Gaming Monthly | 2/5 |
| Eurogamer | Avoid |
| GameSpot | 4/10 |
| GamesRadar+ | 2.5/5 |
| Hardcore Gamer | 3/5 |
| IGN | 6.0/10 |
| PC Gamer (US) | 40/100 |
| PCGamesN | 5/10 |

Tom Clancy's Ghost Recon Breakpoint received "mixed or average" reviews from critics, according to review aggregator website Metacritic. The game was described as "underwhelming" and "miserable", with criticism for its mechanics and mission design.

Richard Wakeling of GameSpot wrote that "Breakpoint is a messy hodgepodge of disparate ideas, pulling various aspects from other Ubisoft games and shoehorning them in, half-baked and out of place [...] Its defining characteristic boils down to just how generic and stale the whole thing is."

PCGamesN reviewer Gina Lees writes "Breakpoint has the habit of never fully committing to the new elements it introduces". One of the examples is the exhaustion level, which, according to the reviewer, does not limit the player much, anyway. Also, from the review it seems the player has unlimited supply of bandages, which makes healing too easy and the injury system unnecessary. Similarly, Destructoid reviewer Peter Glagowski notes that the survival aspects of the game can be ignored, as "the penalties for not engaging with them are slim".

Lees wrote that the main campaign is based on discovering a location, clearing it out, collecting clues and putting them together, adding that "after a while this loop starts to feel repetitive and rather dull." Lees calls the gunplay "gratifying" and is glad that most enemies can be killed with a headshot. She summarises: "Although co-op play dilutes the boredom that sets in during repetitive missions, the game never quite finds itself among a mishmash of survival and RPG elements."

According to a review in GamesRadar, most missions follow the same formula. VG247 says that "Almost every mission plays out the same." GamesRadar, Edge and VG247 complain about bugs in the game. While GamesRadar calls the story in the game "surprisingly interesting", a PCGamer reviewer said "the quality of the storytelling is generally poor".

An Edge reviewer wrote that "It's all surprisingly immersive" before "it goes and spoils it all by saying something stupid like 'raids', or 'gear levels', 'choose your own objectives' and 'why not pay some real money for these outfits?'".

For a Hardcore Gamer reviewer the biggest problem with the game is that it seems to be Ghost Recon Wildlands and The Division 2 mixed together, for which he does not see the point, as the two other games exist.

Destructoid reviewer Peter Glagowski writes that unlike the previous Ghost Recon titles which demanded the players to "play like the military operatives they inhabit", Breakpoint does not put emphasis on realism and makes the player look for better equipment. The developers promised to work on a patch which would "address the most pressing issues, fix bugs and include further improvements requested by the community". They later released "immersive mode", which makes loot less important. Ian Boudreau, senior news writer of PCGamesN, writes: "I'm no longer helicoptering my way around Auroa looking for new gear to pick up, and it's a major relief to not be worried about swapping out hats or comparing rifle stats".

=== Microtransactions ===
The scale of the game's microtransactions system drew criticism when a Reddit user, who had purchased for early access, posted a number of in-game screenshots which detailed items that players could buy with real-world money. Concerns were raised that this allowed players to bypass aspects of grinding as content could be bought as soon as the game began, as well as fears of it being pay-to-win.

Ubisoft responded by releasing a statement saying they "aimed at offering a fair and rewarding experience to our players however they want to experience our game" and "two key factors stood out as extremely important for the team: That Tom Clancy's Ghost Recon Breakpoint doesn't include any pay-to-win elements, [and] to make sure that players not choosing to engage with in-game purchases do not see their experience affected." At the same time, Ubisoft removed the "Time Savers" microtransactions affecting player levelling, stating they had not been intended to be implemented so early and would return in due course. Kotaku argued that while they disagreed with their inclusion, the microtransactions were able to be ignored as all content on offer could still be obtained through hours of playtime and with little difficulty. Writing upon release, Polygon were concerned with the ability to obtain every item in the game's store using real-world money, but noted that while doing so had some benefit, it was not possible to spend obscene amounts to gain an advantage over opponents in PvP as the game would automatically equalize each player's stats. Additionally, buyable weapons, which relied on crafting to improve further, were scaled to the player's current level.

==== Ubisoft Quartz ====
In December 2021, Ubisoft added to Ghost Recon Breakpoint support for Ubisoft Quartz, a non-fungible token (NFT) service for obtaining in-game items such as weapons, gear, and cosmetics (referred to by Ubisoft as "Digits") using cryptocurrency. The announcement video on YouTube received an overwhelmingly negative reception from the community with a 96% dislike ratio, prompting Ubisoft to unlist it. Users criticized the technology because Ubisoft terms of service state that the company has "no liability" for claims or damages and is aware that the blockchain "may be subject to specific weaknesses, which make them possibly targets for specific cybersecurity threats” and disclaim "liability in the risks implied by the use of this new technology."

Some Ubisoft developers raised their concern over the announcement. French trade union Solidaires Informatique criticized Ubisoft's plan for Quartz, stating that blockchain technology is "harmful, worthless, and without future", and that it is "a useless, costly, ecologically mortifying tech which doesn't bring anything to videogames". Ars Technica observed that "Ubisoft's (...) plans make no sense" because Quartz system is so deeply controlled by Ubisoft that a simple conventional internal database would achieve the same result without the overhead of a blockchain.

After their initial release, trade volume for Digits was virtually zero in the following weeks. Players who used them complained that no one noticed the Digits during multiplayer matches. Ubisoft released the last Digit for Ghost Recon Breakpoint on March 17, 2022 and ended support for the game shortly after.

=== Sales ===
The PlayStation 4 version of Tom Clancy's Ghost Recon Breakpoint sold 54,733 copies within its first week on sale in Japan, making it the second bestselling retail game of the week in the country. Three weeks after its release, Ubisoft CEO Yves Guillemont was quoted as saying the game's overall sales figures had been disappointing.

=== Accolades ===
| Year | Award | Category | Result | Ref. |
|---|---|---|---|---|
| 2019 | Game Critics Awards | Best Online Multiplayer | Nominated | |
| 2019 | Gamescom | Best PC Game | Won | |
| 2019 | Titanium Awards | Best Spanish Performance (Bruce Falconer) | Nominated | |
