= Daemon X Machina =

2019 video game

- Switch eShop artwork
- Developer: Marvelous First Studio
- Publishers: WW: Marvelous; WW: Nintendo (Switch); NA: Xseed Games (Windows)
- Directors: Ken Awata; Ken Karube
- Producer: Kenichiro Tsukuda
- Designer: Noriaki Maruyama
- Programmer: Yuta Kawano
- Artists: Shōji Kawamori; Yūsuke Kozaki
- Composers: Rio Hamamoto; Toaki Usami; Mitsuhiro Kitadani; Yusuke Yamauchi; Junichi Nakatsuru
- Engine: Unreal Engine 4
- Platforms: Nintendo Switch; Windows
- Release: Nintendo Switch; September 13, 2019; Windows; February 13, 2020
- Genres: Action; Third-person shooter
- Modes: Single-player; Multiplayer

Daemon X Machina is a 2019 action game developed and published by Marvelous for the Nintendo Switch. A Windows port was released in 2020. A sequel, Daemon X Machina: Titanic Scion, was released on September 5, 2025.

== Gameplay ==
In the game, the player controls a custom character, who commands an Arsenal mech and engages in battle with other mech enemies. The player avatar's stats, abilities, and appearance can be customized in the Hangar, which serves as the game's main hub. The Hangar is also the area where players create their custom Arsenal using body parts bought or collected throughout the game. It is also the place where players browse through different missions for both single player and online cooperative multiplayer.

== Plot ==
After a moon collided with the Planet, it radiated a special energy that turned artificial intelligence against humanity. The Outers, a group of pilots who command mechs, gained special abilities after being afflicted by the mysterious energy. They act as humanity's protectors and guardians as the war with the Arms of Immortals (AIs) rages on.

== Development and release ==
The game entered production around mid 2017. It was announced at E3 2018. Kenichiro Tsukuda, who produced the Armored Core series, served as the game's producer, while Yūsuke Kozaki provided character designs. A limited time special demo was released on February 14, 2019. The game features a more vibrant color palette in comparison to Armored Core, a choice made by the development team to ensure that the game could be visually appealing and unique. The development team also included inspirations of rock and metal elements into the game's music, created by several composers including Junichi Nakatsuru and Rio Hamamoto of Bandai Namco.

The game was released on September 13, 2019, published by Marvelous in Japan and Nintendo worldwide. To help promote the release of Daemon X Machina on the Nintendo Switch, Super Smash Bros. Ultimate hosted a special five-day limited event where players could obtain four spirits featuring characters with their mechs from the game.

A port of Daemon X Machina for Microsoft Windows was released on February 13, 2020. While this version does exclude some of the licensed downloadable content, it otherwise contains all other content released from the Nintendo Switch version. In December 2020 an update allowed for the transfer of save data between the Switch and Windows versions.

== Reception ==
Reception

Aggregate scores
Aggregator	Score
Metacritic	NS: 69/100; PC: 72/100
OpenCritic	46% recommend

Review scores
Publication	Score
4Players	47%
Destructoid	7/10
Eurogamer	Recommended
Game Informer	5.5/10
GameSpot	7/10
Hardcore Gamer	4/5
IGN	6.5/10
Jeuxvideo.com	12/20
Nintendo Life	7/10
Nintendo World Report	6/10
Screen Rant	4/5
The Games Machine	8.2/10

At launch, Daemon X Machina received "mixed or average reviews" according to review aggregator Metacritic. Fellow review aggregator OpenCritic assessed that the game received fair approval, being recommended by 46% of critics.

=== Sales ===
Daemon X Machina launched at #4 on the Japanese charts, and #19 on the U.K. physical charts. As of October 2019, the game has sold more than 42,217 physical copies in Japan. Marvelous has stated that Daemon X Machina has done "very well" on the Nintendo Switch.

== Sequel ==
In September 2021, Kenichiro Tsukuda confirmed a sequel was in the works on a livestream marking the game's second anniversary. Its title, Daemon X Machina: Titanic Scion, was announced during the Marvelous Game Showcase in May 2023. Titanic Scion was released on September 5, 2025 for Windows, Nintendo Switch 2, PlayStation 5, and Xbox Series X and Series S.
