= Sea of Solitude =

2019 video game

- Developer: Jo-Mei Games
- Publishers: Electronic Arts; Quantic Dream (Director's cut)
- Director: Cornelia Geppert
- Producer: Patrick Lehrmann
- Designer: Dirk Kultus
- Programmers: Dirk Kultus; Rob Lubawski
- Writer: Cornelia Geppert
- Engine: Unity
- Platforms: PlayStation 4 Xbox One; Windows; Nintendo Switch (Director's cut)
- Release: July 5, 2019; March 4, 2021 (Director's cut)
- Genre: Adventure
- Mode: Single-player

Sea of Solitude is a 2019 indie adventure video game developed by Jo-Mei Games and published by Electronic Arts. Played from a third-person perspective, the game follows a young woman named Kay as she navigates a submerged city while confronting monsters that symbolize her feelings of loneliness and mental health struggles. Gameplay combines exploration on foot and by boat with puzzle-solving, platforming, and the use of a flare mechanic to guide progression, alongside optional collectibles.

The game was conceived and written by Jo-Mei co-founder Cornelia Geppert, who drew on her personal experiences with depression and loneliness. First announced in 2015 and unveiled publicly at E3 2018, Sea of Solitude was released on July 5, 2019, for PlayStation 4, Xbox One, and Windows PC. A revised version, Sea of Solitude: The Director's Cut, featuring new dialogue, voice acting, and additional features, was released for Nintendo Switch in March 2021 by Quantic Dream. Both versions of the game received mixed reviews, with critics praising its visuals, atmosphere, and exploration of mental health themes, but finding its gameplay repetitive and unchallenging.

== Gameplay ==
Sea of Solitude is an indie adventure game played from a third-person perspective and narratively structured in episodes. The player controls Kay, a young woman who is undergoing a transformation into a monster and searches the sea and flooded cities for a cure. Players can navigate the environment on-foot and by a motorboat. Kay can also exit her boat to swim in the surrounding water. Kay must avoid dangers in the game. She can interact with some of the other monsters in the game, with some helping and others hindering her. Though an adventure game, it includes elements from puzzle, platformer, and stealth games.

In the game, Kay's primary objective is not to fight her enemies, rather, she defeats them by clearing their corruption. This is done by collecting small orbs through platforming and puzzle-solving, which allows the player to cleanse the corruption points, which appear as glowing orbs surrounded by black clouds. Doing so increases Kay's understanding of their problems. Some of the game's monsters attack Kay, and upon death she respawns where she left off. The game's animation depicts the dark energy being sucked into Kay's orange backpack. Another mechanic in the game is the flare. Shooting the flare guides the player to their next location. It also acts as a weapon for the player, as it can defeat and kill shadow enemies. As the game continues, the flare can be used to turn shadow enemies into allies to help retrieve orbs that the player cannot reach. The game includes two types of collectibles the player can search for during their journey; messages in bottles the player collects and seagulls the player shoos away.

== Plot ==
The player controls a young woman named Kay who suffers from such strong loneliness that her inner feelings of hopelessness, anger and worthlessness turn to the outside and she becomes a monster. As Kay, the player explores a seemingly empty flooded city and interacts with its scaly red-eyed creatures to reveal why she turned into a monster. Her emotions manifest into giant monsters standing in her way, trying to help but also destroy her. She needs to interact with and understand their underlying intentions to overcome the negative effects of those emotions. The game is an inner dialogue of a person trying to reconcile her own shortcomings.

As the game progresses, it's revealed that Kay's parents Adam and Vivienne had her at a very young age, followed by a brother named Sonny 12 years later. Sonny was bullied often at school, but Kay was oblivious to his pleas for help because she was distracted by her growing relationship with her boyfriend Jack. Adam regretted Vivienne having Kay as early as she did because family obligations held him back in his career, and tensions over it led them to get a divorce. Sometime later, Jack went through a bout of depression and steadily isolated himself from his friends, breaking up with Kay in the process. Kay had her own bout of depression as a result, until she sorts through the events of her past over the course of the game.

== Development ==
Sea of Solitude was developed by Jo-Mei Games, a twelve-person studio based in Berlin, Germany. The studio's first title, it was written by Cornelia Geppert, who said that the inspiration for it arose in 2014, a time when she felt creatively unfulfilled despite stable studio work, and after she ended a long-term relationship and entered a new one with a man who suffered from clinical depression and left her alone periodically for days at a time. She considers this time period as one of the darkest and loneliest times in her life, as she was also helping friends suffering with depression, which in turn led her own low feelings. Geppert, having always wanted to develop an adventure game with a deep, emotionally driven story that focused on human emotions for years, stated that Sea of Solitude was "the most artistic and personal project" she had ever created, and compared the game's writing process to how singer-songwriters fill their output with their emotions. She detailed: "As an artist, you process your emotional world by getting it out and putting it into your art." As well as writing the game, Geppert served as its chief executive officer, art director, and creative director.

Jo-Mei Games originally worked on free-to-play browser games. The studio's first prototypical game was similar to Sea of Solitude, though it was rejected by publishers for being "too artistic", and they were encouraged to make it a free-to-play game. When the game was pitched to Electronic Arts, it was picked up after then-vice president, Patrick Söderlund, expressed his enthusiasm towards its themes surrounding mental health and loneliness. Before it was pitched, Jo-Mei Games developed and refined their existing prototype with its earnings. The game received funding from Medienboard Berlin-Brandenburg in July 2014 and its production primarily took place in Berlin.

Sea of Solitude focuses on loneliness, and during development, Jo-Mei hoped to reach an audience that understood the game's message and would feel less lonely after playing. At E3 2018, Geppert said that the idea that "When humans become lonely, they become monsters" was the core of the plot. To ensure the game's themes surrounding mental health were handled appropriately, Geppert consulted with Russ Pitts, a former game journalist who founded Take This, an organization that works to educate about mental health issues within the game industry. During development, everyone in the studio shared their experiences with loneliness with each other, to allow the story to account for multiple perspectives on it. The game attempts to display different types and manifestations of loneliness experienced by people, while also showing the emotions that come because of it and how others react to their struggle. Despite the game's heavy subject matter, Geppert hoped that the story's progression would uplift and inspire empowerment in the player. The game's setting is based on Berlin, Geppert's hometown. Kay, the protagonist of the game, was modeled after Geppert and inspired by Geppert's negative experiences following a breakup in 2013. In the game, it is established that Kay is close to her family, despite feeling alone, a choice incorporated to show that loneliness could be experienced by someone if they were surrounded by their loved ones. Kay's design depicts her covered in black fur. When designing Kay, Geppert imagined scribbling on paper to release frustration. Kay's loneliness transforms her into a monster, a metaphor for the mental health issues caused by loneliness in humans. Horror movies such as Jaws (1975) inspired the game's other sea monsters, who represent different types of loneliness made apparent in their designs and actions. Geppert intended for every monster in the game to represent a figure from Kay's life–such as her family members, and used them as a metaphor for the way mentally ill people are stigmatized in real life. As well as voicing Kay, Miriam Jud served as the lead animator for Sea of Solitude. Geppert described the art style and tone of Sea of Solitude as "a mixture between Studio Ghibli and Silent Hill". She explained that the visual style was inspired by her passion for manga, particularly the visuals of Ghibli, whereas games such as Silent Hill inspired the game's horror elements. She also credited her previous work as a comic book artist as in inspiration for the art style, as it inspired her to translate 2D art styles into a 3D space. The game's environmental changes to mirror Kay's emotions; such as water elevation levels and weather.

== Release ==
Sea of Solitude was first announced in February 2015, with the game's official website revealing screenshots and GIFs from it to showcase its visuals. It was picked up by Electronic Arts in 2016, becoming the second game to be announced under the EA Originals label, after Fe (2018). EA Originals is an initiative used to help fund and promote indie games. The game's first trailer was revealed at E3 2018, while the game was still under development. During promotion, gameplay was not shown or discussed as Geppert feared spoiling the game's plot. It was released for PlayStation 4, Xbox One and PC on July 5, 2019.

At The Game Awards 2020, held in December, it was announced that a director's cut of Sea of Solitude, published by Quantic Dream, would be released for the Nintendo Switch. The re-release included a new script, new voice acting, and include a photography mechanic. Geppert returned as the game's writer, creative director, art director, and head of game design. It was released on March 4, 2021.

== Reception ==
=== Critical response ===
==== Original version ====
Reception

Aggregate scores
| Aggregator | Score |
|---|---|
| Metacritic | XONE: 72/100; PS4: 69/100; PC: 64/100 |
| OpenCritic | 40% |

Review scores
| Publication | Score |
|---|---|
| Destructoid | 7.5/10 |
| Game Informer | 7.5/10 |
| GameRevolution | 2.5/5 |
| GameSpot | 7/10 |
| IGN | 6.5/10 |
| PC Gamer (US) | 64/100 |
| Shacknews | 7/10 |
| The Guardian | 4/5 |

According to review aggregator website Metacritic, all versions of Sea of Solitude received "mixed or average reviews". OpenCritic reported that 40% of 94 critics recommended the game.

Critics responded positively to the game's setting and worldbuilding. Vice's Nicole Clark commended the world for being engaging and interesting, writing that she enjoyed spending time exploring it during gameplay. Both Clark and Janet Garcia of IGN appreciated the frequent changes in the game's environment, and GameRevolution's Michael Leri wrote that it the frequent contrasts invited viewers to appreciate each one's beauty. Garcia said that she liked the balance between exploring on-foot and in Kay's boat. Sam Watanuki of TheGamer described the setting as "beautifully constructed". Ozzy Mejia of Shacknews commended how the world's layout reflected Kay's emotional state through its environmental changes and thought it contributed to the narrative's effectiveness.

The game's visuals and presentation were praised. Digital Trends writer Scott Petite said the game was able to leave an impression solely through its striking visuals. Rock Paper Shotgun's Alice Bell complimented the subtle details the game's animation. While Garcia agreed that the game was visually appealing, she noted that she found some environments to be reminiscent of each other. Malindy Hetfeld of The Guardian believed the game was well-rendered and described its soundtrack as "soothing". GameSpot's Richard Wakeling found that the contrast between night and day helped to emphasize the game's beauty. The game's sound design garnered a positive response from Favis and Watanuki, who both believed it helped the game's immersion.

Sea of Solitude's narrative was met with a positive response. Petite called the game successful in its attempt to depict many manifestations of loneliness. The game's narrative was cited by Wakeling and Game Informer's Elise Favis as its greatest strength, with Wakeling calling it "a heartbreaking tale out of genuine characters and believable grief", and Favis writing that she was usually excited to see which monster Kay would encounter next, believing the game did a good job at humanizing her opponents and establishing and developing characters. The Los Angeles Times's Sam Watanuki praised the story for tonal flexibility, particularly its ability to switch between moments Kay faces serious danger to more calm and peaceful scenes. Todd Martens liked how the game conveyed a deeply personal narrative, likening the experience to an intimate dialogue between the player and Geppert. Hetfeld admired Geppert's writing, believing that it helped the game leave an emotional impact. Clark was generally positive towards the story, though was dismayed by the amount of dialogue given the game's emphasis on worldbuilding, believing the game felt too exposition-heavy at times. Vikki Blake of Eurogamer praised the game's opening act, though thought that afterwards it struggled to maintain its emotional impact. Bloody Disgusting's Michael Pementel thought the game effectively captured the emotions felt by Kay, though found some parts of the story to be confusing due to the game not having a clear timeline. The A.V. Club's Alex McLevy felt the heavyhanded story weighed down enjoyable gameplay, while Screen Rant's Scott Baird found the story interesting in concept, though failed to translate to the medium of video gaming. The ending was praised by Wakeling, who felt that its ambiguity reflected reality while also concluding the game's overarching conflict of self-discovery and healing in a satisfying way.

Baird liked the designs of the monsters, calling the designs of the underwater ones "genuinely unnerving". Similarly, The Verge's Andrew Webster praised the game's monster designs, writing that they all successfully reflected the type of trauma they symbolized. Though Leri praised the monsters for being suitably threatening, he found the game's attempts at symbolism through their designs ineffective. The game's horror elements were complimented by Clark due to the variety of creative designs of the creatures, though she noted that she wished the game had lent the more focus to its horror scenes.

Bell appreciated the game's compassionate exploration of emotional complexity, highlighting its gentle reminders about the dual nature of feelings and the humanity behind people perceived as monsters. Watanuki commended the game's handling of mental health, believing it effectively personified the emotions associated with its heavy topics. Pementel praised the game's upfront presentation of the hardships faced by people struggling with mental illness and depression, while Destructoid's Josh Tolentino liked the game's open handling of serious topics, feeling that the game's blunt writing would resonate with players needing uncensored emotional messages. Conversely, Hetfeld responded negatively to the game's depiction of depression as "something inherently dark that needs expunging". Blake was complimentary of the game's themes and found them powerful, however felt the game was weighed down by the lack of subtlety they were treated with, believing a more ambiguous handling and longer runtime would have benefited the game for a broad audience. Clark thought that issues tackled by the game, such as bullying, marital challenges, divorce, and suicidal ideation failed to cohere with each other as they focused on different people in Kay's life.

The simplistic gameplay mechanics received mixed reactions. Garcia praised the usage of the game's light flare mechanic, as it was utilized to do more than provide directions. However, she criticised the gameplay as a whole for being monotonous, particularly the corruption clearing and repetitive attack options. Wakeling agreed, arguing that mechanics became repetitive and overused as the gameplay lacked progression throughout the entire runtime. Hetfeld and Davenport agreed that the game's traditional gameplay mechanics undercut its mature themes, believing its simplicity contrasted with the game's nuanced narrative. Webster praised the gameplay, writing: "It's not especially challenging, but it's all very streamlined and well designed." Bell and Petite agreed that the gameplay was straightforward, but enjoyable. Favis found the puzzles unchallenging and fighting monsters "lackluster", though complimented platforming scenes. Mejia was critical of the flare mechanic as he found it to be ineffective in guiding the player to their objective and to contain several glitches. Blake complimented the control of Kay's boat, calling it "a joy to use". Garcia wrote of mixed feelings towards the game's collectible options, as she enjoyed collecting the bottles though disliked shooing the seagulls, while The Washington Post's Christopher Byrd and Riley MacLeod of Kotaku found both of the game's collectible mechanics unnecessary.

Petite found the dialogue in Sea of Solitude well-written and interesting, and thought it adequately covered the characters' backstories. Wakeling described in-game conversations as "very raw and are oftentimes uncomfortable", but believed the game avoided becoming overly dreary thanks to its more lifhr-hearted moments throughout. However, Garcia called the script "heavy-handed" and thought that the dialogue distracted from the immersion and weakened the impact of some scenes. Both Leri and Favis panned the dialogue of the game, both finding it clumsy and unnatural. Byrd found the dialogue overly dramatic and "gracelessly straightforward and unironic". Polygon's Nicole Carpenter was thought Kay's inner monologue was too blunt and precise, lessening the game's impact as she believed it would have been more successful if it was more subtle. James Davenport of PC Gamer thought Kay's overly calm demeanor during horrifying events weakened her character arc and made her unrealistic. Garcia believed the voice acting from the sea monsters was overly theatrical, making the scenes seem unrealistic. Leri and Wakeling were critical of the voice acting, with Leri finding it amateurish and Wakeling describing it as unconvincing. Baird, however, praised the vocal performances from the game's monsters.

==== Director's Cut ====
Director's Cut reception

Aggregate scores
| Aggregator | Score |
|---|---|
| Metacritic | 69/100 |
| OpenCritic | 33% |

Review score
| Publication | Score |
|---|---|
| Nintendo Life | 6/10 |

Metacritic reported that Sea of Solitude: The Director's Cut also received "mixed or average reviews". OpenCritic reported that 33% of nine critics recommended the game.

In comparison to the original game, Abram Buehner of Comic Book Resources liked that the director's cut further improved the original game's strengths, though expressed frustration towards the few fixes the director's cut incorporated to points of critique towards the original game. Both Screen Rant's Rob Gordon and TheGamer's Scott Penwell enjoyed the director's cut's photo mode, with Gordon noting that the game's beauty justified the mechanic's inclusion. The new voice acting and dialogue of the director's cut received praise from Gordon, who found it to be an improvement over the original game. The voice acting was commended by Penwell and he found the dialogue believable. In contrast, Nintendo Life's Stuart Gipp thought the new voice acting was a step down from the original, as he found the voices well-performed, but insincere.

Abram Buehner of Comic Book Resources thought the narrative was the game's strength, describing it as "vulnerable and raw", and that its ending was impactful and empowering, while Gipp found the it clumsy and overly familiar, and thought that it relied on heavy-handed symbolism that failed to resonate. Penwell enjoyed exploring the world, and appreciated the game's visuals and soundtrack, and Buehner liked the visuals and sound design, believing they helped strengthen the narrative. Gordon thought the visuals were just as impressive as they were in the original game, though the smaller size of the Switch resulted in drops in the quality. Gipp found the game visually and technically impressive on the Switch, though criticized how occasional glitches caused unfair deaths. However, Gipp added that he generally found gameplay enjoyable due to the responsive controls and satisfying exploration, despite the game's linear structure. Buehner also found the game functional and well-controlled, though criticized the lack of gameplay progression throughout the story and found the different gameplay styles used to be incohesive. Penwell noted annoyance towards the version's technical issues such as input delay and character glitches, and wrote that they occasionally broke the game's immersion.

=== Accolades ===
Sea of Solitude was nominated for Games for Impact at The Game Awards 2019. In 2019, it was also nominated for Game, Special Class at the National Academy of Video Game Trade Reviewers Awards, and won the award for the Best 3D Visuals at the Unity Awards. In 2020, the game was nominated for the Matthew Crump Cultural Innovation Award at the SXSW Gaming Awards, as well as the Games For Change Award for the Most Significant Impact.
