= Pix the Cat =

2014 video game

- Developer: Pastagames
- Publishers: Pastagames; Focus Home Interactive
- Designer: Nadim Haddad
- Programmers: Fabrice Kocik; Jérémy Laumon; Fabien Delpiano; Thomas Bonin
- Artist: Hervé Barbaresi
- Platforms: Xbox One; PlayStation 4 Windows; PlayStation Vita; Nintendo Switch
- Release: PS4, Vita; October 7, 2014; Windows; January 29, 2015; Xbox One; February 8, 2017; Switch; August 8, 2019
- Genres: Snake, puzzle
- Mode: Multiplayer; single-player

Pix the Cat is a video game developed by Pastagames for Xbox One, PlayStation 4, Windows, Linux, PlayStation Vita, and Nintendo Switch. The game stars the cat Pix as he saves ducklings in a maze-like environment.

== Gameplay ==
Pix the Cat is a mash-up of Snake and Pac-Man. Some levels are fast paced, where Pix must constantly collect ducklings without crashing its growing tail into an obstacle. Other levels only require a few items to be collected, but require more strategy.

== Development ==
French developer Pastagames had worked with publishers for Rayman Jungle Run, Pix’n Love Rush and A.R. Rescue, but the team opted to release Pix the Cat independently. The game was in development for over three years.

Pix the Cat was made for PlayStation 4 and PlayStation Vita. Fabien Delpiano explained the team's goal to create a game where "sensations grow and intensify as your skill improves". Delpiano described the team's playtesting method for Pix, using a custom-built arcade cabinet in various locations including bars and game conventions. The game was released in October 2014.

== Reception ==
Pix the Cat

Aggregate scores
Aggregator	Score
GameRankings	79% (PS4)
Metacritic	80/100 (PS4)

Pix the Cat received generally favorable reviews from critics, with a score on review aggregator Metacritic of 80/100. Critics generally praised the game's retro gameplay and aesthetic. Writing for PlayStation Universe, John-Paul Jones called the game "a classic arcade puzzler with gameplay compounded by a tremendous amount of scope for mastery and blistering retro aesthetics". In a positive review for Eurogamer, Bruno Galvão found that the game could be enjoyed in both short sessions or several hours. Jeremy Peeples of Hardcore Gamer echoed this, complimenting the "surprising amount of depth" found throughout the game.
