= Killer Queen (video game) =

2013 video game

- Developer: BumbleBear Games
- Publisher: BumbleBear Games
- Designers: Joshua DeBonis & Nikita Mikros
- Engine: Unity
- Platform: Arcade
- Release: August 2, 2013
- Genres: Real-time strategy, platform
- Mode: Multiplayer

Killer Queen is a competitive real-time strategy arcade game for up to ten players, developed by Josh DeBonis and Nikita Mikros, the co-founders of BumbleBear Games. It was initially developed as a field game, but premiered in arcade form in 2013 at New York University's fourth annual No Quarter exhibition for indie arcade games.

The game is designed to be played by two teams of five players across two linked arcade cabinets, typically set side-by-side or back-to-back. It's played on a single-screen arena, with each player controlling a single unit (if there are fewer than ten players, inactive units will be AI-controlled). Four players on each team control "Workers" but one and only one player on each team controls the "Queen", hence the game's name. Teams compete to be the first to get any one of three possible victories, with matches typically lasting a few minutes each.

In 2019, Liquid Bit Games partnered with BumbleBear Games to develop a console game inspired by Killer Queen, called Killer Queen Black. It was released on October 11, 2019 on Microsoft Windows and Nintendo Switch, on February 22, 2021 for Xbox One, a month later on March 30, 2021 for Google Stadia, and on June 10, 2021 for Amazon Luna. On October 6, 2022 it was taken down from all storefronts after the backend being used for the online component (Amazon GameSparks) was shut down. On July 10, 2026, the Killer Queen Black was relisted on Steam for free.

== Gameplay ==
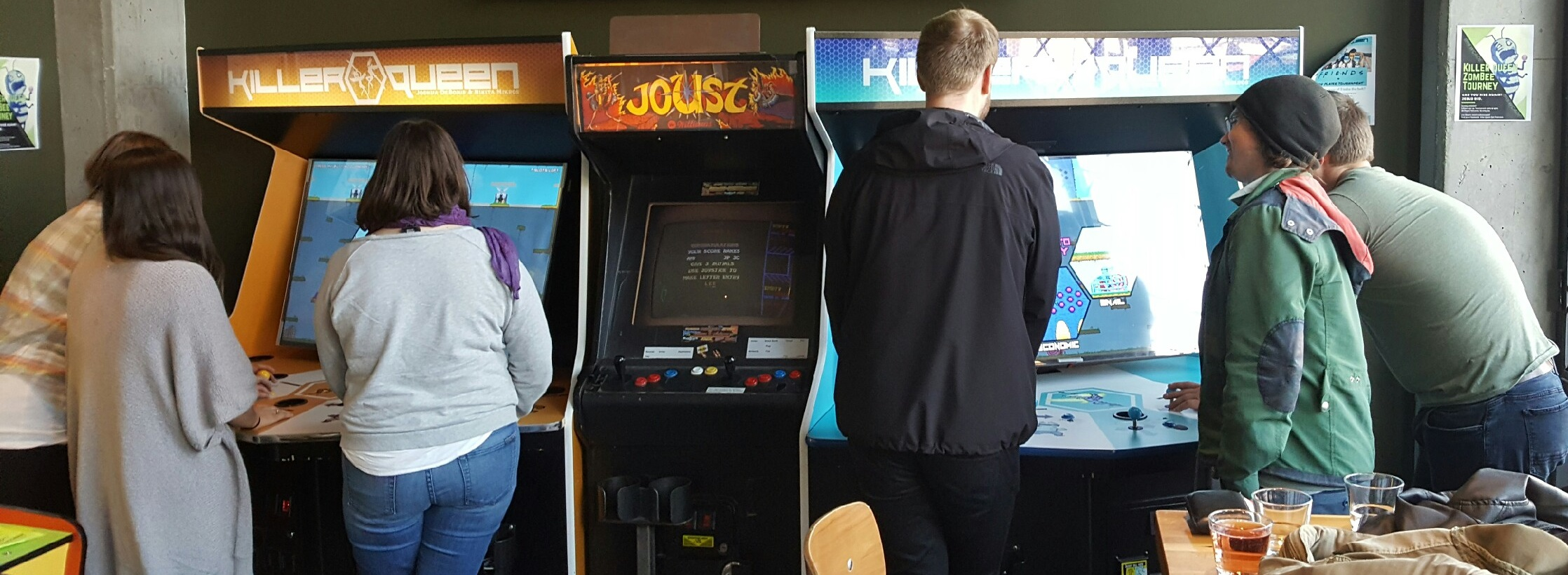
Killer Queen being played at Brewcade in San Francisco

Killer Queen is played by two teams of up to five players each, across two linked cabinets (a blue cabinet for Blue team, and a gold cabinet for Gold team). The game is a 2D platformer, with a shared arena which fits entirely on each cabinet's screen. There are a variety of different arenas, but all arenas have berries, gates, a snail, and a base and basket for each team. Four players on each team initially play as Workers, while one player is the Queen. Both Workers and the Queen will respawn shortly after dying.

Teams can win by fulfilling one of three victory conditions:

1. Military Victory: Kill the enemy Queen three times.
2. Economic Victory: Bring a specific number of berries to your team's base (the number varies per arena but is the same for both teams).
3. Snail Victory: Ride the snail to your team's basket.

Workers can pick up berries (carrying only one at a time) and ride the snail, but cannot kill other units. However, if a Worker takes a berry to a Warrior gate, they become a Warrior until they die. Warriors cannot pick up berries or ride the snail, but they can kill other units and can fly. Workers can also take berries to Speed gates, which causes them to both move faster and ride the snail faster. (This speed upgrade is also maintained if the Worker turns into a Warrior.)

The Queen, like a Warrior, cannot pick up berries or ride the snail, but can always fly and kill other units. The Queen also has a special "dive" attack, and can touch gates to convert them to her team's side, preventing the enemy team from using them. However, as mentioned, if the Queen dies three times, the enemy team wins via Military Victory.

If a team fulfills any one of the victory conditions, they immediately win the match.

== Development ==
Killer Queen went through several iterations on its journey to the arcade, starting off as a college rec league-like outdoor field game inspired by the scent trails of ants. DeBonis and Mikros premiered the field game at New York City's Come Out & Play festival, where it won awards for “Most Strategic” and “Best in Fest.” After the success of the field game, the game grew into more of a passion project. Mikros and DeBonis - under the independent game studios Sortasoft and Smashworx - started developing the digital game alongside the field game in 2011. Iterations came and went, with one idea being a projected screen and 10 players holding retro NES controllers. It was when the two made a bet with NYU professor Charles J. Pratt, who thought the field game could not be transformed into a successful multiplayer arcade game, that the structure of Killer Queen today started to take form. By 2013, DeBonis and Mikros had an early version of the arcade cabinet ready. With a commission from the NYU Game Center, the team dove into building the game's cabinet and preparing the game for debut at the college's fourth annual No Quarter exhibition.

The duo wanted to maintain the social aspects of the field game, and pared down the player count to 10 total. With five on each side, jammed close together jostling for space on the arcade machine's control panel, the repeating theme of “Meet Thy Neighbor” flashing across the screen is fitting. After the debut, Mikros and DeBonis took the game on a tour of arcade and video game shows, including Indiecade, GDC, the Amusement Expo and more. As players praised the raucous, community-oriented gameplay, investors and locations operators took interest.

The game soon found itself intersecting with the growth of bar arcades, with Logan Arcade in Chicago becoming the first commercial home for an arcade version of Killer Queen. The game was a hit there, becoming popular enough to warrant an entire night dedicated to playing it each week, and popularizing a trend that would have many bar arcades hosting league nights for it, filling locations on otherwise less popular nights. Community became integral to the game, with leagues similar to the competitive pinball scene growing to include an eager new fan base. As multiple bar arcades reported success and revenues the team behind Killer Queen took it to the next level. They entered into the traditional arcade industry, looking to provide a unique experience in a traditional arcade cabinet. In 2016, Mikros and DeBonis contracted with Raw Thrills to build cabinets on a larger scale. The traditional arcade giant, headed by legendary designer Eugene Jarvis, made some changes to the cabinets and tweaks to the gameplay. The manufacturer upped the monitor size slightly, added retro style side art, included a tutorial for new players and added an AI system to fill in spots for groups less than 10 playing.

Development continues on the game, with new maps, gameplay tweaks and more released through patches and updates to owners of the now 200+ cabinets in locations nationwide.

== Reception ==
The arcade game was received well, finding success in bar arcades especially. It received multiple awards, including the Developer's Choice Award at 2013's Indiecade and was a finalist at the Independent Games Festival in 2015.

== Community ==
As the cabinet reached more locations across the country, the growth of Killer Queen players happened organically, but not without help from community organizers nationwide. Because of the sheer numbers required to play, organizing something more than just one group of friends became necessary to keep a scene alive and thriving. Community organizers began coordinating on Facebook and Discord to share best practices, strategies and ways to entice players to join. League nights grew from small dedicated groups of friends returning to their local haunt weekly to play into crowded venues with Killer Queen at the center of all the action.

The stark physical reality of cramming 10 people around two cabinets meant conflict was sure to arise. But early on, community organizers prioritized non-toxic play, inviting anyone and everyone to the sticks to help keep the community healthy and grow the player base. Active communities grew quickly in Chicago, New York, Portland and many other cities. Competitive play was important, but what organizers soon realized was an inviting player base was more important. Star players only lasted as long as their welcome wasn't worn out, and since the game was in person, side-by-side and face-to-face, the toxicity that plagues many online multiplayer games was engineered out of the communities by diligent organizers.

As scenes began to grow in cities, players became more and more interested in traveling to play. Self-organized, these teams showed up in other cities that hosted a Killer Queen cabinet for a weekend of tournament play in what became the beginnings of a more official competitive scene.

== Esports/competitive play ==
Early competitive play came in the form of community-organized tournaments, some of which were streamed on YouTube and Twitch. The first tournament happened in the same place the arcade version of the game debuted: No Quarter at New York University. Some 60 people showed up to the upbeat gathering. The idea spread to other cities, with players organizing alongside arcade owners to gather the city's player base around one cabinet for tournament play.

The game soon became popular enough for DeBonis and Mikros to organize, with the help of their players, an official tournament called BumbleBash. BumbleBash 1 was hosted in November 2016, with teams from Chicago, Portland, New York, San Francisco, Phoenix, Kansas City, Columbus, Charlotte, Minneapolis and Austin coming to compete. Over 150 players spread across 33 teams traveled to play, and since the first BumbleBash, the numbers have only grown. BumbleBash 4 was held in 2019 in Chattanooga with over 300 attendees, and BumbleBash 5 was held in October 25-27, 2024 in Chattanooga.

Competitive play and tournaments came to a halt in 2020 due to the COVID-19 pandemic, but both official and community-organized tournaments began to return in 2021. In November 2021, BumbleBear hosted BumbleBash: Remix as a draft tournament at the Midwest Gaming Classic in Milwaukee. The year's largest invitational tournament, GDC V in San Francisco, attracted over 100 players on 25 teams.
