= Genesis Alpha One =

2019 video game

- Developer: Radiation Blue
- Publisher: Team17
- Directors: Jens Jankuhn; Sascha Jungnickel
- Designers: Jens Jankuhn; Sascha Jungnickel
- Programmer: Claus Praefcke
- Writer: Claus Wohlgemuth
- Engine: Unreal Engine 4
- Platforms: Windows, PlayStation 4, Xbox One
- Release: January 29, 2019
- Genres: Roguelike, simulation
- Mode: Single-player

Genesis Alpha One is a roguelike simulation video game developed by Radiation Blue and published by Team17. It was released on January 29, 2019 for Windows, PlayStation 4 and Xbox One. The player is tasked with managing a colony ship in search of a new home for humanity, as well as embarking to planets in first-person action segments. The player has the freedom to customize the ship's design, its crew members, and create human-alien hybrids to colonize otherwise inhospitable worlds.

The game received mixed reception from critics, who enjoyed its premise, but believed its execution was lackluster, including tedious gameplay and generic crew members who were bland and boring in both personality and design.

== Gameplay ==
The player is put in charge of a colony ship crewed by human clones, designed as an ark for humanity's survival, constructing bare essentials and then launching into space. The player then takes control of one of the ship's crew members at random, going into first-person mode. The player proceeds to search the galaxy for ship and crew upgrades while fighting off hostile alien life.

== Development ==
The game was developed in Germany using Unreal Engine 4. Ship-building with modules was part of the initial gameplay concept, and was inspired by the International Space Station. Meanwhile, attacks on the ship by insectoid aliens was inspired by the Alien series. The alien AI was heavily tested to make sure it could traverse levels built by players. Adding automatically closing doors between modules reduced the demand for system resources. In order to decrease the game's scope to more manageable levels, the development team did not include manual piloting of the ship, only letting the player hyperjump to a new planetary system. Planetary landings on inhospitable planets were also restricted to a small landing zone around the dropship.

== Reception ==
The game had mixed reviews on all platforms. Robert Zak of PC Gamer stated that "the constituent parts for something interesting are here", calling its ship-building system a "logical and varied loop" of activities, but said that it was either too easy to defend against aliens or they would end the player's run quickly. Saying that the ship's clone crew had "so little character it's hard to care", he summed the game up as "bland tasks alongside [...] bland colleagues". Jordan Helm of Hardcore Gamer gave the game a poor rating, summing up its state as "questionably lacking" despite its "fair number of interesting ideas". He commented on "the considerable lack of polish, indecisively wonky aesthetic and utterly dismal implementation of random events both visually and structurally", describing lengthy play sessions as potentially being a waste of time. Allesandro Barbosa of GameSpot also rated the game poorly on Xbox One, stating that "it isn't that all of these systems buckle under the weight of their interconnectivity - it's that none of them are that engaging to interact with in the first place." While describing "building out your vessel" as "generally satisfying", he noted that the tasks associated with the ship quickly got tedious, decrying the lack of a centralized interface. He also described the crew's AI as "largely useless without your input".
