= My Friend Pedro =

2019 video game

- Developer: DeadToast Entertainment
- Publisher: Devolver Digital
- Designer: Victor Ågren
- Programmer: Victor Ågren
- Artist: Victor Ågren
- Writer: Victor Ågren
- Composers: Navie D Noisecream; Nounverber; Battlejuice; Maks_SF
- Engine: Unity
- Platforms: Nintendo Switch; Windows; Xbox One; PlayStation 4
- Release: Nintendo Switch, Windows; 20 June 2019; Xbox One; 5 December 2019; PlayStation 4; 2 April 2020
- Genre: Run and gun
- Mode: Single-player

My Friend Pedro is a 2019 run and gun video game developed by Swedish developer DeadToast Entertainment and published by Devolver Digital. The game was released for Nintendo Switch and Windows on 20 June 2019 and for Xbox One on 5 December 2019. A PlayStation 4 port of the game was released on 2 April 2020. My Friend Pedro is based on an Adobe Flash game named MFP: My Friend Pedro that was released by Adult Swim Games in 2014.

A free-to-play spin-off, titled, My Friend Pedro: Ripe for Revenge, was released for iOS and Android on August 5, 2021.

== Gameplay ==
Screenshot of gameplay. The player in slow-mo mode shoots in two directions.

My Friend Pedro involves the player traversing a variety of themed levels while killing enemies, at the behest of a talking banana named Pedro.

The game iterates on the gameplay featured in the flash game, including similar controls, mechanics and weaponry. Along with the ability to slow time, the player can now kick objects or enemies, split their aim between targets and dodge bullets by spinning. The game also features parkour elements such as flips, wall jumps and rolls, which can be used to increase the number of points awarded. Another new feature allows players to kill enemies by ricocheting bullets off frying pans or signs, which also adds to the point total.

Points are awarded for each successful hit from the player, while each kill increases the current point multiplier. Players are given a rank at the end of each level based on their total number of points, which is shared on a global leaderboard.

== Plot ==
The game begins with a masked, unnamed, silent protagonist waking up inside a butcher shop owned by a man named Mitch. The protagonist is instructed by Pedro (a floating sentient banana) that Mitch is an arms dealer and must be eliminated. Upon escaping the butchery and killing Mitch, the protagonist heads to the district Null, an abandoned community project now home to a man named Denny and his army of bounty hunters. When confronting Denny he flees but reveals that his sister Ophelia controls the Internet. The protagonist deals with Denny and heads via the sewers to confront Ophelia. After defeating Ophelia, it is revealed that the protagonist has been systematically killing his own family: with Mitch being his father, Denny his brother and Ophelia his sister. Pedro reveals to the player that the protagonist despised his family for their criminal activities, but could not bring himself to kill them, so he knocked himself unconscious and erased his memory so that he could eliminate his family without guilt. Upon revealing this, Pedro jams himself into the protagonist's ear and tries to have him shoot himself. The final battle is a visual representation of the protagonist's mental struggle to resist Pedro's influence. With Pedro defeated, the protagonist removes his mask, revealing that he was Pedro all along with the banana being nothing but a figment of his imagination.

== Development ==
My Friend Pedro started development in February 2015 "on and off" until indirectly announcing that development would be in full swing on 4 December 2015 in a devlog. It had been announced that it was in the pre-alpha stage of development on 21 November 2015 aimed to release on PC and "eventually" macOS computers.

== Reception ==
Reception

Aggregate score
Aggregator	Score
Metacritic	NS: 78/100; PC: 81/100; XONE: 76/100; PS4: 71/100

Review scores
Publication	Score
Destructoid	7/10
Game Informer	6/10
GameSpot	7/10
IGN	8.5/10
Nintendo Life	7/10
Nintendo World Report	81/100
PC Gamer (US)	7/10
Push Square	6/10
The Guardian	4/5

My Friend Pedro received "generally favorable reviews" according to review aggregator Metacritic. IGN's Mitchell Saltzman reviewed it with an 8.5/10 score, saying it "simply feels great to play", while noting that the campaign has little replay value.

The game was nominated for "Fresh Indie Game" with DeadToast Entertainment at The Game Awards 2019.

== Television series ==
On July 2, 2020, Legendary Television, it was announced that Dmitri M. Johnson’s DJ2 Entertainment, David Leitch, and Derek Kolstad will produce a R-rated half-hour dramedy television series adaptation of the game with Kolstad set as the showrunner.
