= Lost in Random =

2021 video game

- Developer: Zoink
- Publisher: Electronic Arts
- Directors: Olov Redmalm; Klaus Lyngeled
- Artist: Victor Becker
- Writer: Ryan North
- Composer: Blake Robinson
- Engine: Unity
- Platforms: Nintendo Switch; PlayStation 4; PlayStation 5; Windows; Xbox One; Xbox Series X/S
- Release: 10 September 2021
- Genre: Action-adventure
- Mode: Single-player

Lost in Random is a 2021 action-adventure game developed by Zoink and published by Electronic Arts. Part of the EA Originals program, the game was released for Nintendo Switch, PlayStation 4, PlayStation 5, Windows, Xbox One, and Xbox Series X/S on 10 September 2021. It was the final game developed by Zoink prior to their consolidation into Thunderful Development. It received generally positive reviews from critics. A spin-off game titled Lost in Random: The Eternal Die was released in June 2025.

== Gameplay ==
Lost in Random is an action-adventure game played from a third-person perspective. Combat happens in arenas that look like a game board. Players must roll Dicey in order to progress and Even will only be safe when she reaches the final piece on the board. In combat, the player can use Even's slingshot. While it does not damage enemies, opponents hit by her slingshot drop energy cubes which fuel Dicey. Once Dicey is fully fueled, players can roll it and time will be temporarily stopped. During this period, players can select the card they want to use, which is the only way to deal damage to enemies. There are five different types of cards (Weapon, Damage, Defense, Hazard, and Cheat), offering different gameplay advantages and combat abilities. For instance, one of the cards turns Dicey into an explosive cube, while another allows players to place traps. Cards can be earned through collecting coins. As players progress, new cards will be earned and they will recover Dicey's lost pips, which would enable Even to roll higher numbers during combat.

The game also features light role-playing game elements. When Dicey and Even are exploring the Kingdom of Random, they will meet various non-playable characters. The game features a dialogue wheel which allows players to select dialogue options while conversing with NPCs.

== Plot ==
In the Kingdom of Random, the fate of all individuals is decided by a cursed black die when they reach the age of 12, with any who roll a six becoming a ward of the Queen as a "Royal Sixer" including Even's twin sister, Odd. A year later, Even secretly leaves home and journeys across the six realms of Random to rescue her sister, following a ghost. She meets Dicey, a sentient die who has lost nearly all of its pips and allows Even to use magical powers in the form of Cards.

Even slowly traverses Random, following the ghost. In Two-Town, everyone has split personalities based on the Queen's roll. Threeburg is ruled by triplets in constant war, each thinking the other was responsible for their father's murder. Even finds Fourberg completely destroyed by the Queen. Fivetropolis, where the magical Cards are made, has been turned into a factory to produce robots for the Queen. Upon reaching Royal Six, Even finds the castle is a complete hoax, a cardboard facsimile, with the whole Queendom overrun with black crystals, before finally entering the Black Die. Inside, Even finds all of the children abducted by the Queen are being harvested for their nightmares, to feed three dark gods. Even finally locates Odd, but discovers that Odd has been corrupted by the Queen and now willingly serves her. After defeating her, Odd's mask is broken, freeing her from the Queen's control. Odd uses Dicey to create a portal for the sisters and the abducted children to escape through. Fleeing the crumbling castle, the sisters find the suspended body of Princess Natalya, the Queen' s sister, who died during the game's prologue by random chance, and had been the ghost seen by Even, leading her through Random. Enraged, the Queen agreed to harvest children for the dark gods to keep her sister in suspended animation, and abolished all dices to "eliminated randomness." She also engineered the catastrophes of the various realms to keep them constantly distracted from the Queen's efforts at kidnapping the children. The princess begs the Queen to let her finally die, as even in the time stop, she's in constant suffering.

The Queen stays behind to fight the dark lords as Even, Odd, Dicey, and the other children escape. Dicey produces umbrellas for them to float away on. Odd is concerned about where they will end up, but Even does not care as they all float off into the distance.

== Development and Release ==
Lost in Random was developed by Swedish developer Zoink. According to Olov Redmalm, the game's creative director, Lost in Random was a homage to "dark fairy tales" and stop-motion animation. During the game's production, the team inspected the works of animation studio Laika, movies directed by Tim Burton, Grimms' Fairy Tales, and the Oddworld series for inspirations. Each realm features its own visual design, with art style inspired by The Nightmare Before Christmas, Over the Garden Wall, and the works of Australian artist Shaun Tan. The game was penned by Ryan North, who had previously worked on The Unbeatable Squirrel Girl and the Adventure Time TV series. The game's soundtrack was composed by British composer Blake Robinson, who had previously worked on Portal Knights and The Stanley Parable.

Publisher Electronic Arts, which had partnered with Zoink previously with Fe (2017), announced Lost in Random at EA Play 2019. The game was an "EA Originals", a segment of EA's publishing aimed to help indie developers with financing and publishing of their titles to reach a wider audience without EA being as involved in the game's development, thus allowing the studio to take more of a share of sales revenues. The game competed for the inaugural Tribeca Games Award and was included as an official selection. The game was released for Nintendo Switch, PlayStation 4, PlayStation 5, Windows, Xbox One, and Xbox Series X/S on 10 September 2021.

== Reception ==
Reception

Aggregate score
Aggregator	Score
Metacritic	(NS) 79/100 (PC) 77/100 (PS4) 80/100 (PS5) 78/100 (XSXS) 74/100

Review scores
Publication	Score
Destructoid	8/10
Easy Allies	7.5/10
Game Informer	8.25/10
IGN	8/10
Nintendo Life	8/10
Nintendo World Report	7.5/10
Push Square	8/10
Shacknews	7/10
Pure Xbox	8/10

Lost in Random received "generally favorable" reviews from critics for most platforms, except for the Xbox Series X/S version which received "mixed or average" reviews, according to review aggregator website Metacritic.

Destructoid praised each of the six realms, feeling that they were distinct from each other in non-visual ways, "Zoink does a good job of theming each world after its numerical, dice-based namesake. There's an amusing logic to how each realm operates. Seeing those quirks play out as Even, a total newcomer, is pretty entertaining". Rock Paper Shotgun liked the atmosphere of Random's world, noting its Burtonian influences, "Everyone teeters on long spindly limbs, and they're either gremlins with upside down faces, or withered trees wearing top hats. They're all amusing too, with a few sending you on more original and fun side quests to break up the linear ride. I traded complicated words with an auntie catfish, for instance". Game Informer enjoyed how the combat system mixed real-time action with deck-building, feeling it was a completely unique take on both genres, "The system is genuinely creative, smoothly executed, and every layer works in tandem to create a unique experience". While criticizing the length of combat encounters, IGN felt the characters helped plot become more memorable, "Incredibly memorable characters like Mannie Dex, Seemore, Herman, Ooma, The Nanny, and so many others make moving to the next world kind of like watching the next movie in a 20-hour series of timeless holiday classics".

Kotaku liked the game's side-quests, stating they often were hilarious, "I had a great time just poking my head into every nook and cranny of the various realms, looking for characters to talk to and side-quests to complete... The range of dialogue options and the ways in which they impact the game are yet another reason I had such a good time exploring and talking to everyone I met". Nintendo World Report disliked how long quests and combat encounters took to complete, "The biggest hurdle in Lost in Random is the pacing of the game. It frequently drags out quests and missions to a point where it can feel simply tedious to walk all the way across the town again to find a specific item".
