= The Temple of No =

2016 video game

- Developer: Crows Crows Crows
- Publisher: Crows Crows Crows
- Platform: Browser
- Release: June 2016
- Mode: Single-player

The Temple of No is a 2016 text adventure game by Studio Crows Crows Crows. It was written and voice acted by William Pugh, co-creator of The Stanley Parable and Accounting+, and designed and illustrated by Dominik Johann. Developed in Twine, it was published for free on Itch.io.

== Gameplay ==
The particularly self referential story can be experienced as one of three characters: a woman, a man, or a frog, as they enter a mysterious forest and discover the eponymous "Temple of No". As usual for Twine text adventures, the player advances through point and click.
