= High on Life (video game) =

- Developer: Squanch Games
- Publisher: Squanch Games
- Producer: Matty Studivan
- Designers: Erich Meyr; Andy Vatter
- Programmers: Nick Weihs; Dan Weiss
- Artists: Mikey Spano; James Yavorsky; Colby Wahl
- Writer: Alec Robbins
- Composer: Tobacco
- Engine: Unreal Engine 4
- Platforms: Windows; Xbox One; Xbox Series X/S; PlayStation 4 PlayStation 5 Nintendo Switch; Nintendo Switch 2
- Release: Windows, Xbox One, Series X/S: WW: December 13, 2022; PS4, PS5: WW: July 22, 2023; Nintendo Switch: WW: May 6, 2025; Nintendo Switch 2: WW: August 28, 2025
- Genre: First-person shooter
- Mode: Single-player

High on Life is a 2022 comedic first-person shooter game with action-adventure and Metroidvania elements. It takes place in a science fiction world which features talking guns. It was created, developed and published by Squanch Games. The game was released on December 13, 2022 for Windows, Xbox One and Xbox Series X/S. It was later ported to PlayStation 4 and PlayStation 5 on July 22, 2023, to Nintendo Switch on May 6, 2025, and to Nintendo Switch 2 on August 28, 2025. The game received mixed reviews from critics, who were divided on its humor, while criticizing the technical issues upon launch. A sequel, later titled High on Life 2, was announced on June 9, 2025, and released on February 13, 2026.

== Gameplay ==
High on Life is a first-person shooter video game with action-adventure and Metroidvania elements. Players are tasked with assassinating select targets, and must fight their way into the target's lair and then fight the targets in a boss battle.

Players attack using living alien weapons, five living guns called "Gatlians" and one sentient knife. The guns have primary, alternate, and special "trick hole" firing modes that can be used in combat. The knife has an additional grapple ability that allows players to use ziplines to move around the world. Weapon specials are also used to solve puzzles and gain access to certain areas in non-combat scenarios.

Players can gain abilities and upgrade their existing abilities by purchasing upgrades at shops or by finding them in chests. As players get new Gatlians and other equipment it is possible to access previously unreachable areas, as in a Metroidvania.

In addition to combat, players encounter traversal and platforming sections, as well as puzzles that are solved using the Gatlians' weapon abilities, and social areas where players can interact with non-player characters. The game features the 1994 film Tammy and the T-Rex.

== Plot ==
The game's plot centers on an alien invasion of Earth by the G3 Cartel, led by Garmantuous (Hal Lublin), who plans to convert humans into drugs. The player character, along with their sister Lizzie (Laura Silverman), escapes with the help of Kenny (Justin Roiland), a sentient alien weapon known as a Gatlian. Together, they warp their house to the alien metropolis of Blim City.

With guidance from former bounty hunter Gene Zaroothian (David Herman), the player becomes a licensed bounty hunter and takes on missions to eliminate members of the G3. These include 9-Torg (Jennifer Hale), Douglas (Tom Kenny), and Krubis (Echo Kellum). Along the way, the player recruits additional Gatlians, including Sweezy (Betsy Sodaro), Gus (J.B. Smoove), Creature (Tim Robinson), and the bloodthirsty knife-like Knifey (Michael Cusack). They also recover Lezduit (Mike Stoklasa), a legendary Gatlian rendered catatonic from experimentation.

As the group gains notoriety, Blim City's Magistrate Clugg Nuggin offers aid and supplies. Meanwhile, tensions escalate at home as Lizzie becomes romantically involved with an alien named Tweeg. The player also learns that Kenny inadvertently exposed his home planet, Gatlus, to the G3, leading to its destruction—a revelation that causes friction within the team.

The journey spans from the ravaged planet Gatlus to an endangered Earth. In the final battle, the player defeats Garmantuous by planting a remote bomb inside him, which may require sacrificing one of their Gatlian companions. A secret ending reveals that Clugg was conducting experiments on rescued humans. He is executed by Dr. Gurgula (Wayne Pygram), the scientist responsible for the virus that destroyed Gatlus, who hints at further plans before escaping. Clugg's sons vow to protect the remaining humans in his place.

=== High on Knife DLC ===
Set two years after the events of the main game, the Bounty Hunter continues their work on a now-shared Earth with a new Gatlian companion, Harper (Sarah Sherman). With Kenny and Lizzie absent, the player joins Knifey on a mission sparked by a notice about an undelivered package from his homeworld.

Their journey takes them to Peroxis, a salt-covered planet inhabited by slug-like aliens. In Salt Lick City, they acquire a new weapon, B.A.L.L., and infiltrate Muxxalon HQ. Captured by CEO Mux, they are infected with a parasite named Gary and forced into factory labor. Upon discovering that Muxxalon is still trafficking humans, the player rebels and, with Knifey's new chainsaw blade upgrade, defeats Mux.

Knifey returns to his home planet, Australia-II, only to discover he was exiled for excessive violence. Feeling betrayed, he massacres his species during their "Sharpening Day" ascension ritual. The story ends with Knifey reaffirming his bond with the team and preparing to return to Peroxis for unfinished business.

== Development ==
Development of High on Life began in 2019, a short time after the release of the studio's previous title, Trover Saves the Universe. The initial concept, conceived by Justin Roiland, was to develop a first-person shooter that featured talking guns that would speak to the player and react to their actions.

The original High on Life trailer was released at the Xbox and Bethesda Games Showcase on June 12, 2022, with an anticipated release of October 2022. A two-month delay was announced on August 18, 2022, however that set the release date to December 13, 2022, with the stated reason being to finish improving the game. The game was released for PlayStation 4 and PlayStation 5 on July 22, 2023.

The game features a large ensemble voice cast, including Roiland, J. B. Smoove, Tim Robinson, Betsy Sodaro, Michael Cusack, Hal Lublin, Laura Silverman, David Herman, Kevin McDonald, Mike Stoklasa, Tom Kenny, Echo Kellum, James Urbaniak, Maria Bamford, Joel Haver, Wayne Pygram, Andy Daly, Zach Hadel, Rich Fulcher, Thomas Middleditch, Jack Black, and Susan Sarandon. Original music was composed by Tobacco with additional music provided by Morris Borris, Ryan Elder, Sam Houselander, Pete Maguire, Jonathan Peros, Kevin Temmer and Akash Thakkar.

Justin Roiland was heavily involved in the creation of High on Life. He has received credit for creating the original concept of the game and taking part in the design and development of it. Design director Erich Mayr has described the style of the game to be "Blade Runner meets The Muppets".

A paid expansion, titled High on Knife, was released on October 3, 2023. It features the voices of Cusack, Ken Marino, Sarah Sherman, and Gabourey Sidibe.

== Reception ==
Reception

Aggregate score
Aggregator	Score
Metacritic	(PC) 69/100 (XSXS) 67/100

Review scores
Publication	Score
Destructoid	5.5/10
Eurogamer	Avoid
Game Informer	5.75/10
GameSpot	7/10
GamesRadar+	3.5/5
IGN	8/10
PC Gamer (US)	40/100

High on Life received "mixed or average reviews" by critics and "generally favorable" by users according to review aggregator website Metacritic. The game's crude and absurdist humor proved polarizing. In a positive review, IGN called it "an irreverent, absurd shooter that manages to shine with its outrageous humor, silly setting and story", while Eurogamer criticized that the writing "too often settles into edgelord cynicism and the same tedious, punchdown humour as South Park." The Guardian noted that "the line between entertaining and excruciating here is down to how you feel about listening to a game-length version of Rick and Morty's Interdimensional Cable ad-libs".

Reviewers also noted that the game suffered from a number of technical issues. Squanch Games released a day-one patch addressing these bugs, along with a second patch on December 17, 2022.

=== Sales ===
High on Life was the most played title on Xbox Game Pass during the week of its release, and was the fourth most played title on the Xbox platform overall, and was hailed as a "breakout hit" by Xbox VP of Marketing Aaron Greenberg. It also became the top-selling game on Steam.

== Sequel ==
In June 2025, a sequel titled High On Life 2was announced at the Xbox Games Showcase 2025. It was released on February 13, 2026.
