= Dr. Langeskov, The Tiger, and The Terribly Cursed Emerald: A Whirlwind Heist =

2015 exploration video game

Dr. Langeskov
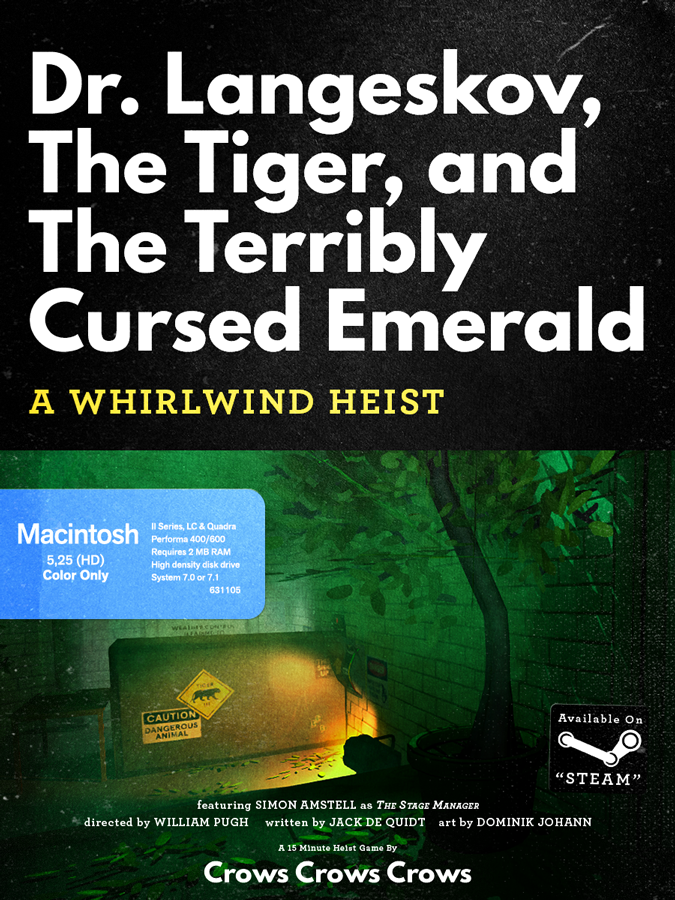
- Developer: Crows Crows Crows
- Publisher: Crows Crows Crows
- Director: William Pugh
- Programmer: Sean O'Dowd
- Artist: Dominik Johann
- Writer: Jack de Quidt
- Engine: Unity
- Platforms: Microsoft Windows, OS X
- Release: December 4, 2015
- Genre: Adventure
- Mode: Single-player

Dr. Langeskov, The Tiger, and The Terribly Cursed Emerald: A Whirlwind Heist (sometimes shortened to Dr. Langeskov) is an adventure video game developed by Crows Crows Crows, a studio created by William Pugh, best known for his work on another video game, The Stanley Parable. The game was released for Microsoft Windows and OS X on December 4, 2015, as a free offering. The game sets up expectations of participating in a narrative-driven story about a heist, but players instead find themselves helping out an unseen narrator before they can participate in the story.

== Gameplay ==
Dr. Langeskov is an exploration game, played from the first-person perspective where the player has some limited interaction with the environment but otherwise no other major gameplay. The player can pick up some objects (such as pieces of paper) that have narrative elements on it, or coins or cassette tapes to locate. Dr. Langeskov is roughly 20 minutes in length.

At the start of the game, the player is given the impression they are about to play a game about a heist taking place in a mansion involving an emerald and a tiger. However, the game appears to glitch out, and they find their player-character in the green room area of the game, fashioned as the backstage of a theater production. A narrator played by Simon Amstell informs the player-character that another player is currently playing the game. As they cannot have two players in the game at the same time, and most of the staff appears to be on strike, the narrator suggests the player-character can help out behind the scenes until the other player leaves, at which point the real player can play it for themselves. The narrator instructs the player-character to complete several small tasks that help to complete the experience for the current player in the game, such as manipulating an elevator when it is called for, or preparing the tiger's cage. The player-character can take some actions or inaction that will cause the narrator to react in different ways, such as by failing to pull a lever when requested causing the narrator to frantically beg for assistance; however, this does not change the overall narrative.

Despite a number of small mistakes and haphazards, the player-character is able to ensure the current player completes the game. The narrator leads the player-character back to the start, and allows them to enter the game. However, while waiting in the dark for the game to start, the player-character overhears the narrator speaking to a new player, in the same situation that the player-character had been in previously. The narrator guides that new player to help the player-character, but in this case, the new player hurriedly rushes through the procedures and accidentally triggers the release of the tiger sooner than expected, and the unseen tiger attacks the player-character. The game abruptly cuts to the credits.

Playing the game the second time allows the player to pick up a cassette deck that lets them listen to various tapes (performed by Justin Roiland) scattered around the game.

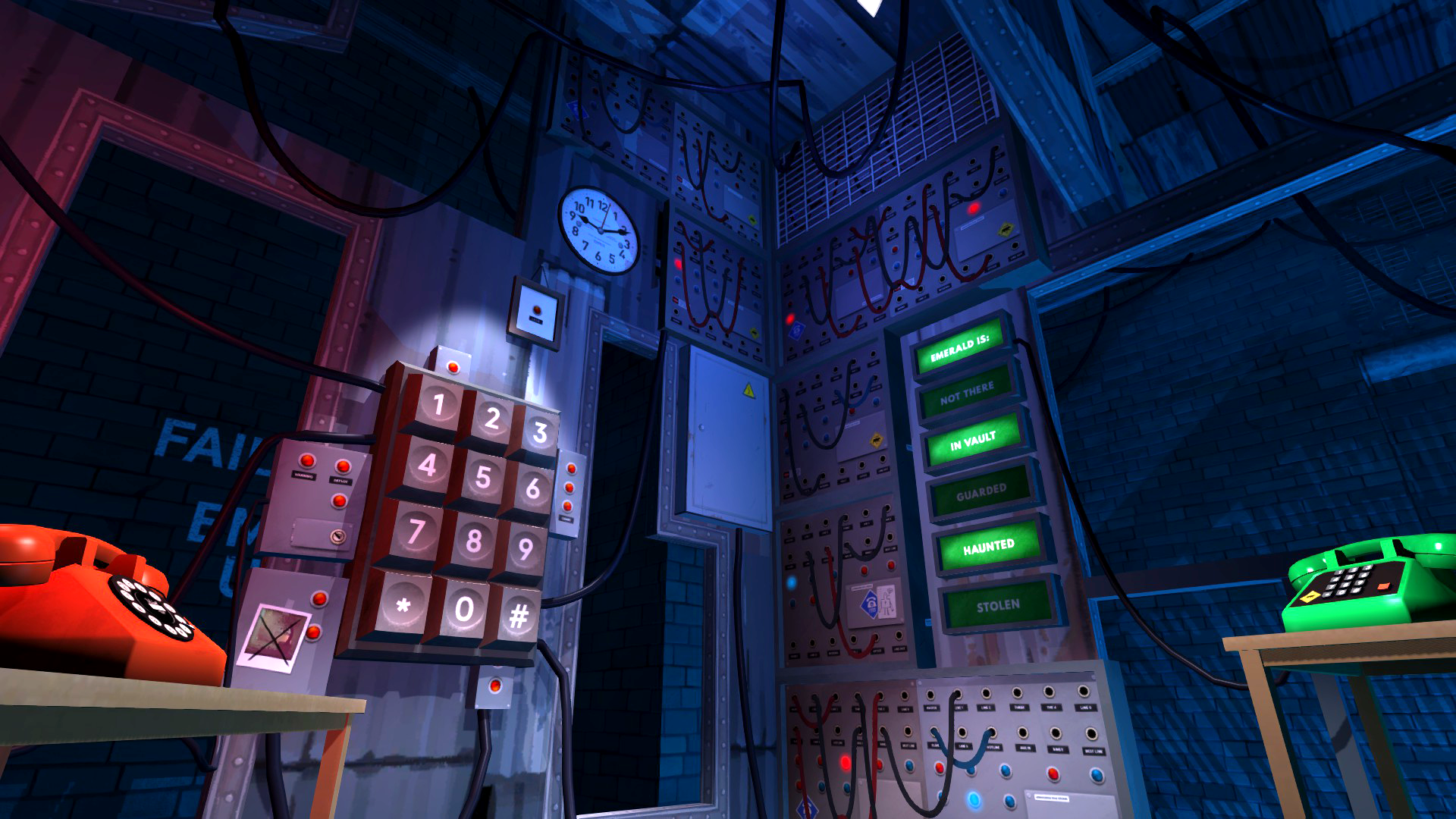
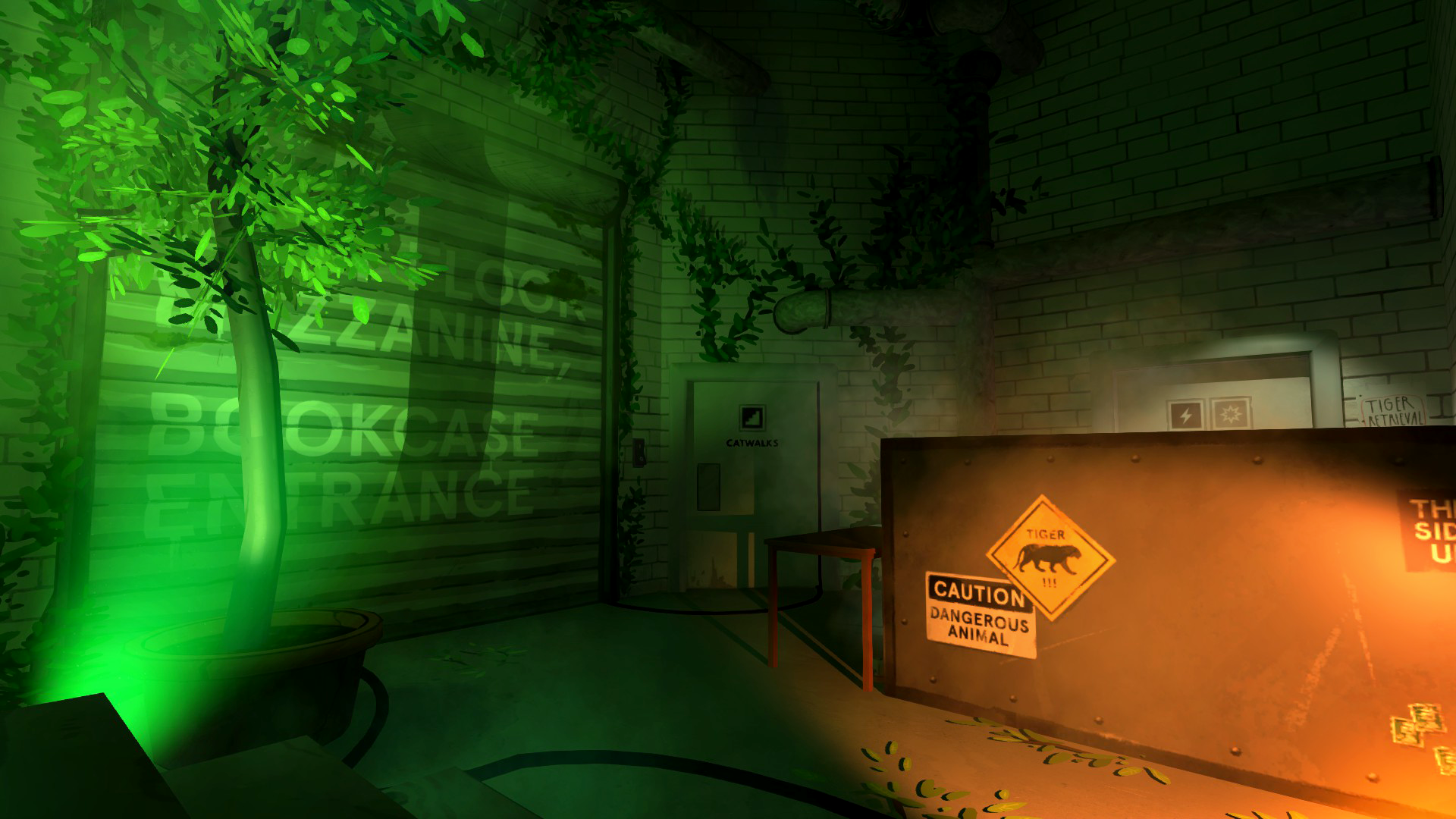
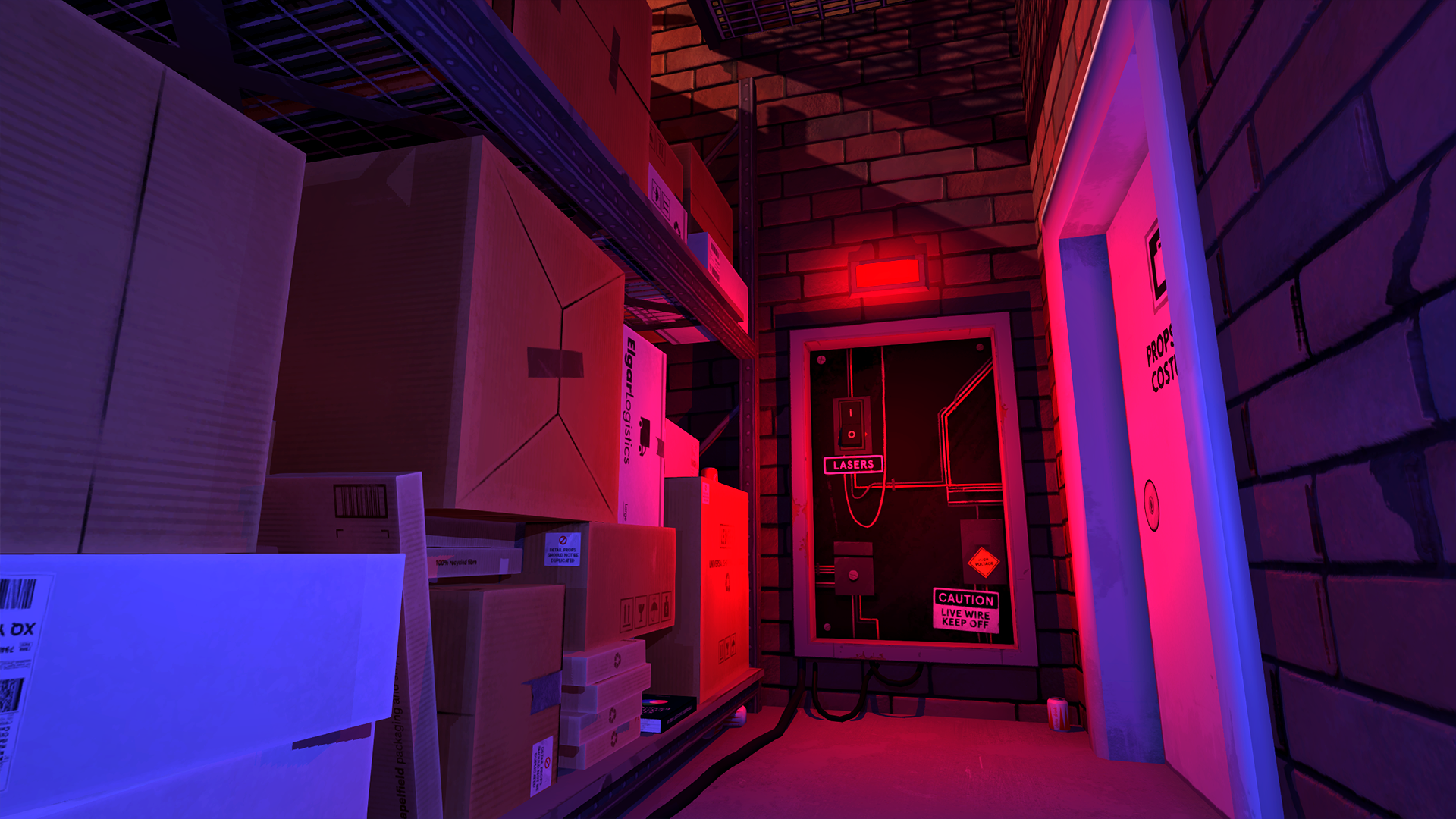
Dr. Langeskov is played from the first-person perspective. The game is roughly 20 minutes in length.

== Development ==
Dr. Langeskov is developed by Crows Crows Crows, an indie studio created by William Pugh, who previously worked on The Stanley Parable, and Dominik Johann; the studio at the time also included writer Jack De Quidt, programmers Sean O'Dowd and Andrew Roper, and composer Grant Kirkhope. The studio teased the release of Dr. Langeskov in October 2015, though at that time had not publicly named the game.

The game includes voice over work from Simon Amstell and Justin Roiland. Pugh also worked with Roiland on Accounting, the second Crows Crows Crows game centered around virtual reality elements.

The game was released on December 4, 2015, as a free download from Steam for Microsoft Windows and OS X.

== Reception ==
Alec Meer of Rock, Paper, Shotgun wrote that the game was "charming, even infectious", and characterized the developer's previous games as known for their surprise and delight. He had high praise for Amstell's performance as narrator. Meer saw Dr. Langeskov as a shortened sequel to The Stanley Parable, though more "playful" than "self-analytical" and more of a response to the game's reception than to the game itself. In comparison to The Stanley Parable, the narrator is not omniscient but unsound and just as confused as the player, similar to Wheatley of Portal 2. Meer wrote that gatekeeping was a prominent theme of the work and that the developers would appear conceited to some players. The reviewer appreciated the questions Dr. Langeskov provoked about how the public thinks about the process of game design.
