= Lost in Random: The Eternal Die =

- Developer: Stormteller Games
- Publisher: Thunderful Publishing
- Composer: Ola Bäckström-Berg
- Platforms: Nintendo Switch; PlayStation 5; Windows; Xbox Series X/S
- Release: June 17, 2025
- Genre: Roguelike
- Mode: Single-player

Lost in Random: The Eternal Die is a roguelike video game developed by Stormteller Games and published by Thunderful Publishing. A spin-off of Lost in Random (2021), it was released for Nintendo Switch, PlayStation 5, Windows and Xbox Series X/S on June 17, 2025

== Gameplay ==
Unlike the original game, The Eternal Die is a roguelike video game played from an isometric perspective. The game follows Queen Aleksandra, the antagonist of the first game. The game features four primary weapons: a sword, a hammer, a bow, and a lance. Attacks can be charged to deliver more damage. Throughout her journey, Queen Aleksandra is accompanied by a sentient dice named Fortune, which will aid the player in combat. Fortune can be thrown at enemies, dealing significant damage. However, the player has to manually retrieve Fortune after each throw. Card attacks can also be used as special abilities. Between runs, the player will receive "relics", which can be used to unlock additional activities for both the player character and Fortune. They can also upgrade and modify their weapons. The player character can also be equipped with "Blessings", which add permanent passive perks.

== Plot ==
Taking place shortly after the original game, Queen Aleksandra becomes trapped in a pocket dimension inside the Black Die (the same die that she previously used in the first game) following her battle against the dark lords. She discovers that she has turned into a young girl and reunites with a sentient die named Fortune, who accompanies her on her journey. They encounter Mare the Knight, the evil entity who controls the Black Die, who was also responsible for manipulating Aleksandra and murdering her sister. Aleksandra and Fortune journey their way through the Black Die's dimension, facing numerous challenges along the way. They also meet inhabitants who are trapped inside the Black Die. After defeating Mare and escaping back to her old castle, Aleksandra proceeds to destroy the Black Die, completing her revenge but leaving her kingdom in ruins.

If Aleksandra rescued all of the inhabitants before defeating Mare, the Black Die is instead transformed into the Eternal Die, free from Mare's influence, though Aleksandra's future is left unknown.

== Development ==
Lost in Random: The Eternal Die was developed by Stormteller Games. The studio was founded as Thunderful Gothenburg in 2017 following the merger of Zoink, the developer of the original game, and Image & Form. The Eternal Die was described by the development team as a spin-off game, and Martin Storm, the game's director, remarked that The Eternal Die is more gameplay focused than the original game. Levels in the game are procedurally generated, though gameplay areas were handcrafted by the team. The game was revealed in August 2024 at Gamescom. It was released for Nintendo Switch, PlayStation 5, Windows and Xbox Series X/S on June 17, 2025.

== Reception ==
Reception

Aggregate scores
Aggregator	Score
Metacritic	(PC) 78/100 (PS5) 83/100
OpenCritic	85% recommend

Review scores
Publication	Score
GamesRadar+	3.5/5
Gamereactor	8/10

The game received "generally favorable" reviews upon release. OpenCritic determined that 85% of critics recommended it.

Alex Hopley from Gamereactor praised the game's world, the performance of the cast, as well as its combat system, though he felt that it did not deviate significantly from the roguelike formula established by Hades. Writing for GamesRadar, Miri Teixeira commended the game's visual design and remarked that it was a accessible roguelike game, praising the game's progression system and combat. However, she was disappointed that the game's focus on gameplay ultimately wasted "a concept ripe for more storytelling", and noted that players unfamiliar with the original game may find its narrative difficult to follow.
