= Tammy and the T-Rex =

1994 film by Stewart Raffill

- Original theatrical release poster
- Directed by: Stewart Raffill
- Screenplay by: Stewart Raffill; Gary Brockette
- Produced by: Diane Raffill
- Starring: Terry Kiser; Ellen Dubin; Denise Richards; Paul Walker; George Pilgrim; John Franklin
- Music by: Jack Conrad; Tony Riparetti
- Production company: Greenline Productions
- Distributed by: Imperial Entertainment
- Release date: December 21, 1994 (United States)
- Running time: 82 minutes
- Country: United States
- Language: English

Tammy and the T-Rex is a 1994 American science fiction horror comedy film directed by Stewart Raffill and written by Raffill and Gary Brockette. The film, which stars Terry Kiser, Ellen Dubin, Denise Richards, Paul Walker, George Pilgrim and John Franklin, centers around a high school student named Tammy, whose boyfriend Michael Brock has his brain implanted in the body of a robotic Tyrannosaurus rex by Dr. Gunther Wachenstein, a mad scientist.

Tammy and the T-Rex in its entirety was featured in the video game High on Life (2022).

== Plot ==
Tammy is at cheerleader practice, and her new boyfriend Michael Brock walks in from football practice to observe. They meet Byron Black, Tammy's gay friend, who approves of Michael as her new boyfriend. Shortly thereafter, Tammy's violent and jealous ex-boyfriend Billy arrives with his gang and harasses Michael; a fight erupts between the two. The police arrive to break up the fight and take Billy into custody, but Tammy, unable to deal with the events, breaks down and runs away in tears.

The scene then cuts to a figure of a Tyrannosaurus rex in a dark warehouse as two people, Dr. Gunther Wachenstein and his assistant Helga, walk through the doors. The lights come on and the Tyrannosaurus rex figure begins to move, being controlled by someone in a room. Dr. Wachenstein is impressed by the robotic dinosaur's strength and reveals his plan to implant a living human brain into the robot to give it consciousness, mobility and "immortality".

Later that night, Michael sneaks out to see Tammy. They are soon interrupted by Billy and his thugs, who chase and catch Michael. They throw him into the wild animal park where lions and jaguars run loose. A lion mauls Michael and he is left in a comatose state. He is brought to a hospital where his intoxicated uncle watches over him.

Dr. Wachenstein and Helga declare Michael dead, so that they can use his brain to control their robotic Tyrannosaurus rex. After his brain is implanted, Michael escapes and wreaks vengeance on his high school tormentors and is reunited with his sweetheart Tammy. She realizes that the dinosaur is Michael and begins a search to find a more suitable body for him. Dr. Wachenstein is in hot pursuit of his monstrous creation, which leads to a chase that ends with Michael killing the doctor. Police officers open fire and destroy the mechanical dinosaur.

Tammy manages to recover Michael's brain. She takes it home with her and hooks it up to her computer, speakers, and video camera. This is temporary until they find a new body for him. Through the set-up, Michael is able to speak and see, which allows him to view Tammy performing a striptease. This causes the brain hookups to spark.

== Cast ==
- Denise Richards as Tanny / Tammy (Note: In all versions of the film, Richards' character is listed as Tanny in the opening and end credits, not Tammy as in the film's original release title and dialogue.)
- Paul Walker as Michael Brock
- Theo Forsett as Byron Black
- George Pilgrim as Billy
- Terry Kiser as Dr. Gunther Wachenstein
- Ellen Dubin as Helga, Dr. Wachenstein's Female Assistant
- Buck Flower as Norville
- Ken Carpenter as Neville
- Sean Whalen as "Weasel"
- J. Jay Saunders as Sheriff Black, Byron's Father
- John Edmondson as Karl, Dr. Wachenstein's Bodyguard
- John Franklin as Bobby, Dr. Wachenstein's Male Assistant
- John F. Goff as Bob Brown, Michael's Uncle
- Efren Ramirez as Pizza Boy
- Shevonne Durkin as Wendy

== Production ==
Stewart Raffill says that he was approached by a man who owned theatres in South America who had an animatronic T-Rex which was going to a park in Texas: "The eyes worked. The arms moved. The head moved. He had it for two weeks before it was going to be shipped to Texas and he came to me and said, "We can make a movie with it!" I said, "What's the story?" and he said, "I don't have a story, but we have to start filming within the month!" and so I wrote the story in a week."

Raffill says all the locations were within 25 minutes of his house. He has stated there was a large fire which took place during the shoot, and that as a result, smoke can be seen in some shots. The first few minutes of the film take place in Newbury Park, California at Newbury Park High School. The film crew kept the local panther mascot and decorations during the filming.

Raffill said: "I was just trying to do a film for people that like wacky movies. In other words, you laugh at the experience that I was facing which is, what the hell are you meant to do with this material? I was sticking all this shit in it, just to make it work. Of course, when you only have a week to work on a script, it is a bit thin! I'm also the biggest plagiarist, I'm constantly asking the cast and crew if they have anything better that they can add."

== Release ==
Originally filmed as an R-rated comedy horror, its gore scenes were removed from its initial American release in order to appeal to a broader audience. In other countries, such as Italy, it was released with these scenes intact.

In 2019, Vinegar Syndrome restored and theatrically released the 90 minute uncut version in select North American theaters. Vinegar Syndrome went on to release the restoration in both DVD/Blu-ray and Blu-ray/4K Blu-ray combo packs.

Squanch Games would later license the film to be used in their 2022 video game High on Life.

== Reception ==
On Rotten Tomatoes, the film has an approval rating of 43% based on 7 reviews, with a 3.8/10 average. The 2019 unrated version of the film, titled Tammy and the T-Rex: Gore Cut, has an approval rating of 100% based on 7 reviews, with an average rating of 6.6/10.

== See also ==
- List of films featuring dinosaurs
