= SnapDragon Games =

German video game developer

SnapDragon Games GmbH
- Company type: Private
- Industry: Video games
- Founded: 13 October 2005; 19 years ago
- Founder: Christian von Duisburg
- Defunct: 2010
- Fate: Insolvency
- Headquarters: Hamburg, Germany
- Key people: Christian von Duisburg (CEO)
- Number of employees: 5 (2009)

SnapDragon Games GmbH was a German video game developer based in Hamburg. The company was founded by Christian von Duisburg in October 2005. Following the demise of CDV Software, SnapDragon Games filed for insolvency in 2010.

== Notable games ==
- Karate Phants: Gloves of Glory (2009)
- The Kore Gang (2010)
