= Squanch Games =

Video game development studio

- Industry: Video games
- Founded: August 25, 2016; 10 years ago
- Founders: Justin Roiland; Tanya Watson
- Headquarters: Burbank, California, U.S.
- Products: Accounting; Trover Saves the Universe; High on Life
- Website: squanchgames.com

Squanch Games (formerly known as Squanchtendo) is an American video game development studio based in Burbank, California. The company was founded by Justin Roiland in August 2016. The studio is most known for developing Accounting (2016), Trover Saves the Universe (2019) and High on Life (2022). The company has offices in Raleigh, North Carolina, and Burbank, California.

== Company ==
Justin Roiland, the co-creator and former voice actor behind the Rick and Morty series, founded Squanchtendo on August 25, 2016, in partnership with Tanya Watson, who previously worked as an executive producer at Epic Games. Roiland previously worked on Pocket Mortys, a mobile game in the Rick and Morty franchise, in conjunction with Adult Swim. He formed the studio with the intention of developing virtual reality games, a passion he had since 2015, being one of the earliest backers for the Oculus Rift virtual reality headset. Roiland first met Watson through Ophir Lupu, United Talent Agency's head of games. Watson, using her contacts at Epic Games, helped the studio to expand and recruit talents. "Squanch" is a planet in the Rick and Morty franchise, while "tendo" is a wordplay of video game publisher Nintendo, though the company changed its name in 2017 to just "Squanch Games" after being advised by a lawyer.

The studio's first game was Accounting, a VR exploration game released in 2016. The game was developed in collaboration with Crows Crows Crows and William Pugh, who worked on The Stanley Parable. An expanded version of the game, Accounting+, which doubles the length of the original game, was released in December 2017. In August 2018, the company acquired the trademark for Radical Heights, a defunct battle royale game, from Boss Key Productions. The studio then went on to work on Dr. Splorchy Presents: Space Heroes, a project for Google Daydream, and Trover Saves the Universe. Unlike the studio's previous games, which was considered to be a more experiential project, Trover Saves the Universe is "significant in length experience". While Trover features VR component, it is not a requirement as the team wanted the game to reach a larger audience. The game was released in 2019 to generally positive reviews. In January 2021, Watson left the studio, and Roiland assumed the position of the company's chief executive officer.

== Legal issues ==
In January 2023, it was revealed a former employee sued Squanch Games back in 2018 over alleged sexual harassment, discrimination, and wrongful termination. According to court documents, the studio denied the claims but later settled. Later that month, Squanch Games announced that Justin Roiland had resigned from his position at the studio.

== Games developed ==
Year	Title	Platform(s)
2016	Accounting+	Windows, PlayStation 4
2018	Dr. Splorchy Presents: Space Heroes	Google Daydream
2019	Trover Saves the Universe	Windows, PlayStation 4, Nintendo Switch, Xbox One, Oculus Quest
2022	High on Life	Windows, Xbox One, Xbox Series X/S, PlayStation 4, PlayStation 5, Nintendo Switch, Nintendo Switch 2
2026	High on Life 2	Windows, PlayStation 5, Xbox Series X/S, Nintendo Switch 2
