= Blake Robinson Synthetic Orchestra =

British video game music composer

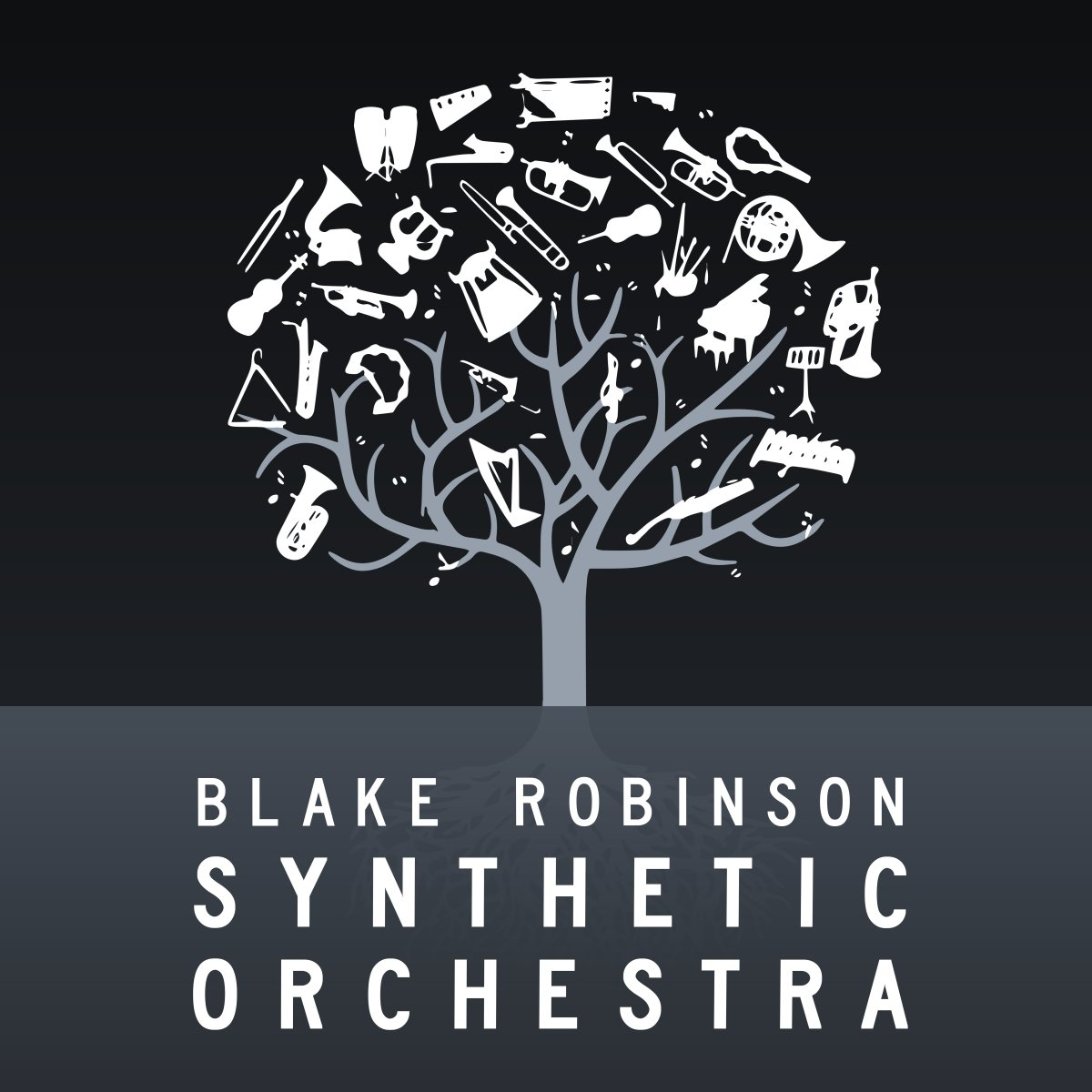

Background information
- Born: Blake Robinson; London, UK
- Genres: Soundtrack, orchestral, classical, video game music
- Occupations: Music software developer, Composer
- Years active: 2001–present
- Website: www.syntheticorchestra.com

The Blake Robinson Synthetic Orchestra, also known simply as The Synthetic Orchestra, is the pseudonym for a British video game music composer and orchestrator Blake Robinson, who has developed a substantial following on YouTube, primarily for his orchestrations, recreations and remixes of popular video game music.

== Career ==
=== YouTube ===
Robinson frequently releases orchestrations of popular video game music on YouTube. His channel features titles from a large variety of genres and various eras of gaming history from Alex Kidd in Miracle World on the Sega Master System to Alan Wake on the Xbox 360. He is also known to play live streams every Sunday starting at 6:00 P.M. GMT. The songs included in his playlist includes most of the songs on his channel, plus a few exclusive songs, only featured in his live streams.

=== Games development ===
Robinson began a career in the games development and worked as a tools programmer and web developer for companies such as Electronic Arts and Realtime Worlds. As music became a bigger interest in his life, he turned his focus to making a career of it, leaving the industry and becoming a freelance music software developer and composer. While he is no longer a full-time games developer, Robinson still spends his free time designing and developing independent video games.

=== Composing ===
Robinson is a keen user of Image-Line's FL Studio and is listed as a power-user on their website. He frequently posts tutorials and walk-through videos on his primary and secondary YouTube channels and is known to go into great depth about the processes and tools he uses to create his music. Robinson has also extended his influence outside of YouTube, releasing several albums of original music composed by himself.

=== Sample development ===
Robinson's primary career is audio software development. He is currently a core part of the Spitfire Audio development team, a collection of composers and engineers that create sample libraries for the Kontakt sampler by Native Instruments and for their standalone sampling engine available in VST/AU/AAX formats.

=== In popular culture ===
The Stanley Parable appeared during the third season of House of Cards, where President Frank Underwood is being shown the game by a novelist and video game reviewer who is writing his biography, with the puzzling nature of the game used as a metaphor for the current politics in the show's fiction. Robinson's music from the soundtrack accompanied the scene.

== Discography ==
- The Synthetic Orchestra: Originals Volume 1 (2012)
- Super Metroid: Ridley's Theme Orchestra (2012)
- The BIOSHOCK Song: Instrumental Version (2012)
- Pixel Hero and the creation of Dr Mindframe (2012)
- Pirates of New Horizons (2012)
- Chrono Trigger: The Last Day of the World Orchestra (2012)
- Dexter For Orchestra EP (2012)
- Uncharted: Drake's Theme Orchestra (2012)
- Final Fantasy IV: Main Theme Orchestra (2012)
- Video Game Orchestrations Vol 1 (2012)
- An unhealthy obsession (2012)
- NumNumNumNum Touch my Body (2013)
- The Synthetic Orchestra: Originals Volume 2 (2013)
- Super Metroid Symphony (2013)
- Video Game Orchestrations Vol 2 (2013)
- NUKEM: Duke 3D Remixes (2013)
- Banjo-Kazooie Symphony (2013)
- Chrono Trigger Symphony: Volume 1 (2013)
- Chrono Trigger Symphony: Volume 2 (2013)
- Bits of Music from The Stanley Parable (2013)
- Chrono Trigger Symphony: Volume 3 (2014)
- Mystery Match: The Soundtrack (2014)
- Crafty Candy: The Soundtrack (2015)
- Portal Knights (2016)
- Portal Knights Volume 2 (2017)
- Portal Knights Volume 3 (2019)
- Portal Knights Volume 4 (2020)
- Lost In Random Volume 1 (2021)
- Lost In Random Volume 2 (2021)
- Lost In Random Complete Edition (2021)

== Video game credits ==
- Crafty Candy: Composer
- Mystery Match: Composer
- Terraria: Console Trailer Composer
- The Stanley Parable: Composer
- Pirates of New Horizons: Composer
- Portal Knights: Composer
- Lost in Random: Composer

== Awards ==
- Robinson is the composer of the soundtrack for Lost in Random, which won "Best Indie Game" at the 2021 Gamescom awards and was nominated for Tribeca's 2021 inaugural Games Award.
- Robinson scored the soundtrack for Portal Knights, which won "Best Online Game" at the 2016 German Game Developer Awards.
- In 2014 Robinson was announced as an IGF finalist in the category of "Excellence in Audio" for The Stanley Parable.
- Robinson was the lead composer for the multi-BAFTA nominated The Stanley Parable.
