= Karate Phants: Gloves of Glory =

2009 fighting video game

- Developer: SnapDragon Games
- Publisher: SnapDragon Games
- Engine: f3d
- Platform: Wii (WiiWare)
- Release: EU: July 10, 2009
- Genre: Fighting
- Modes: Single-player, Multiplayer

Karate Phants: Gloves of Glory is a fighting video game for WiiWare by SnapDragon Games based on German comedian Otto Waalkes's Ottifanten comic characters. It was released in Europe on July 10, 2009. The game had been removed from the WiiShop Channel on June 30, 2012 however it is still available to re-download.

== Gameplay ==
Players control an anthropomorphic, boxing glove wearing elephant in a one-on-one fighting tournament. The game features seven playable characters from across the globe each with their own special moves, and five fighting arenas to compete in.

The game solely uses the Wii Remote for play, with players gesturing the controller to perform directional attacks as well as dashes and jumps. Other player movement is automatically controlled by the computer.

== Reception ==
Nintendo Life criticized a number of aspects of the game including the controls, the "fatally broken" gameplay and the misuse of the Ottifanten license, ultimately calling it "a shambling mockery of a game". Official Nintendo Magazine rated the game at 6%, making it their lowest scored review ever. Like Nintendo Life, they criticized the controls, claiming that they were "the worst ever."
