= High on Life 2 =

2026 video game

- Developer: Squanch Games
- Publisher: Squanch Games
- Director: Mikey Spano
- Producer: Matty Studivan
- Designer: Erich Meyr
- Programmers: Nick Weihs; Dan Weiss
- Artist: Colby Wahl
- Writers: Alec Robbins; Julian Shine; Brian Wysol
- Composer: Tobacco
- Engine: Unreal Engine 5
- Platforms: PlayStation 5; Windows; Xbox Series X/S; Nintendo Switch 2
- Release: PC, PS5, Xbox Series X/S; February 13, 2026; Nintendo Switch 2; July 1, 2026
- Genre: First-person shooter
- Mode: Single-player

High on Life 2 is a 2026 first-person shooter video game developed and published by Squanch Games. As a sequel to High on Life (2022), the game was released for PlayStation 5, Windows, and Xbox Series X/S on February 13, 2026, and on Nintendo Switch 2 on July 1, 2026. The game received mixed reviews from critics, who praised improvements made to the story and traversal mechanics, but criticized the technical issues upon launch and shooting mechanics.

== Gameplay ==
High on Life 2 is a first-person shooter with action-adventure elements. As with the first game, the player has an arsenal of talking weapons called "Gatlians", and High on Life 2 introduces dialogue options for players to choose from when conversing with their weapons. As with the first game, the player character is very mobile and is able to perform feats such as double jumping, dashing, sliding, and using a grappling hook to reach distant places. A new form of movement, the skateboard, can be used to aid both combat and puzzle solving.

== Plot ==
After saving humanity in the first game, the player character becomes a very successful bounty hunter. However, an alien pharmaceutical conglomerate plans to turn humans into pills, and the player character seeks to take them down. The plot kicks off five years after the events of the first game where the player becomes a successful and famous bounty hunter. The Bounty Hunter is enjoying themselves by going on talk shows, getting energy drink offers, and dealing with personal family business and drama. One day Gene (David Herman) recommends gathering up the remaining crew of weapons - Gus (J.B. Smoove), Sweezy (Betsy Sodaro), and Knifey (Michael Cusack) - and going to a family diner. However Gene urges the Bounty Hunter to come quickly to the house as Lizzie (Laura Silverman) - the protagonist's sister, now a leader of a terrorist rebel group known as the Bleeding Stars - has had a bounty placed on her head.

Activating The Bounty 5000 our Protagonist heads to Circuit Arcadia Zoo where Lizzie and The Bleeding Stars are located. However other Bounty Hunters have caught up and our Protagonist must hurry in order to save Lizzie. Eventually we manage to find Lizzie in time alongside her gatlian companion Harper (Amita Rao). The rest of the bounty hunters catch up but demand we take our own sister's life, The Bounty Hunter instead begins to shoot at the other bounty hunters threatening our sister's life causing us to break the bounty hunter code. After killing off the bounty hunters Lizzie runs off, but before we can try to catch up to her a reptilian bounty hunter by the name of Reptical (Whitmer Thomas) knocks us over and pins us down. Reptical tells us how we broke the bounty hunter code and will eventually have our own bounty placed on us worth twice as much as Lizzie's but before Reptical can kill us Lizzie returns and shoots his head off with Harper. Before we can meet up with Lizzie again we salvage a skateboard from Reptical which The Bounty Hunter can use to skate and grind on rails. However Reptical comes back alive as revealed his species can regenerate their limbs including heads and engage in boss battle with Reptical. As we venture through Circuit Arcardia Zoo our bounty suit begins to malfunction and fail due to being disconnected and banned from the bounty network however our onboard A.I assistant Suit O (Alec Robbins) is able to override the ban and let us temporarily continue using our suit. We eventually meet up with Lizzie again and find out about a company known as Rhea Pharmaceuticals who plans to enslave humans in order to turn them into pills and launch them as a drug called Humanzapro. Reptical eventually catches up by finds out Humanzapro causing him to side with The Bounty Hunter and Lizzie. Unfortunately The Rhea Pharmaceutical Lab in The Zoo begins to self destruct as The Bounty Hunter, Lizzie, and Reptical quickly evacuate the facility the bounty suit completely fails rendering The Bounty Hunter immobile leaving Lizzie to rescue her sibling and their gatlian companions.

We wake up in a floating arcade which is the base for The Bleeding Stars where we find Gene and Lizzie. According to both our suit had completely failed rendering it unusable however they were able to find a new suit and copied Suit O over the new suit allowing The A.I to continue assisting The Player. Lizzie informs The Player if they are going to take down Rhea Pharma they must kill some of the people who are funding and working for the company. We come across two new bounties, Larry Pinkstock (Jon Daly) and Senator Muppy Doo (Richard Kind) who both are working for Rhea Pharma. On these missions we meet a gatlian called Travis (Ken Marino) who is currently going through a divorce with his wife Jan (Gabourey Sidibe), and an assassin known as Sheath (Ralph Ineson) who we eventually turn into a gun and personal arsenal. After these missions Lizzie informs The Player they will need to go meet up with their half brother Jeppy who is being chaperoned by Creature (Tim Robinson), a gatlian from the first game. When we go meet up with Jeppy and Creature we are suddenly attacked by a mysterious bounty hunter who is using the same previous suit The Player had worn before. Jeppy manages to fend off the mysterious bounty hunter and gets us safe. After returning Jeppy to The Bleeding Star's base we across another two new missions however one involves going out to dinner at SpaceForest Cafe with The Player's Mother and Sister where it eventually turns into a mission to save The Player's dad from a cult located in Birch Springs Wyoming where we meet Travis's wife Jan. The second mission involves a finance wizard known as James Stevenson (Fred Melamed) who is located in a world that is pixelated and similar to graphics from The Playstation 1. We eventually save another gatlian by the name of Bowie (Frankie Quiñones) who is also after James Stevenson also known as The Blue Wizard who has tricked the planet's civilians into donating money to him and tricked them into thinking it was an investment. After killing The Blue Wizard our mother sends us to Circuit Arcadia Mall to pick up some party supplies at Party City. When we reach Party City the mysterious bounty hunter from before attacks us again and reveals his identity to be the original Suit O however we are attacked by another bounty hunter known as Tiffany who sends us to be imprisoned by Rhea Pharma.

Waking up in a prison cell with Suit O, The A.I explains how when Gene copied over his data it only made a copy and not fully brought over Suit O leaving the original to rot in the non functioning bounty suit. However a mysterious figure approaches luring us closer we find out The CEO behind Rhea Pharma was Nipulon (James Urbaniak), a former G3 Cartel Higher Up who explains how he survived the first encounter and his plans for turning humans into pills. Nipulon then severs one of The Player's arms and leaves. Suit O makes a temporarily treaty with The Player and instructs them on how they can craft a gravity gun in order to break out of the prison cell. During the breakout and escape Nipulon catches The Player and severs the other arm. However Suit O now called Shoot O saves us and manages to send a distress signal to Gene and Lizzie to save the two. Waking up with new robotic prosthetic arms we take on another two new bounties of Bronkin Bucko (Thomas Lennon) and Professor Berkel (Gigi Edgley). after completing both missions we must head the head quarters of Rhea Pharma in order to take down Nipulon but eventually plans change as we must now head to the Intergalactic Supreme Court where Nipulon is preparing to win a case in order to legalize turning humans into livestock to be used in Humanzapro. Either winning or the losing the court case, Nipulon will attack us and we must engage in one final boss battle against him. After killing Nipulon The Judge rules out the case and deems humans not to be turned into drugs once again.

== Development ==
The game was being developed by Squanch Games. The studio looked at the feedback of the original game, and identified areas for improvement. The skateboard was an abandoned idea for the first game, and was originally envisioned as a power-up in the sequel. However, as the team continued to reiterate the game's traversal options, its role was significantly expanded and it became the game's central gameplay pillar. The game was also inspired by the Metroidvania sub-genre and includes three large hub areas, whereas the first game only had one.

The game was announced during Summer Game Fest in 2025. Betsy Sodaro, J.B. Smoove, Tim Robinson, Laura Silverman, Michael Cusack, and David Herman returned to voice characters from the original game, while Ralph Ineson, Ken Marino, and Gabourey Sidibe joined the cast. Other roles were voiced by Amita Rao, Whitmer Thomas, Thomas Lennon, James Urbaniak, Matt Walsh, Allison Tolman, Roz Ryan, Frankie Quiñones, Fred Melamed, Gigi Edgley, Jon Daly, and Richard Kind. Performers who provided additional voices included Maria Bamford, Joel Haver, Vera Drew, Mary Mack, Eric Bauza, Fred Stoller, Rich Fulcher, SungWon Cho, Wayne Pygram, Maurice LaMarche, Joe Pera, and John Waters.

Justin Roiland, former studio head of Squanch Games, is not involved in the project following his resignation from the company in 2023. The game was released on February 13, 2026 for PlayStation 5, Windows, and Xbox Series X/S. It was originally scheduled to release for the Nintendo Switch 2 on April 20, 2026, however it was later delayed to July 1, 2026.

== Reception ==
Reception

Aggregate scores
Aggregator	Score
Metacritic	(PC) 72/100 (PS5) 70/100 (XSXS) 75/100
OpenCritic	59% recommend

Review scores
Publication	Score
Eurogamer	3/5 stars
Game Informer	8.75/10
GameSpot	7/10
GamesRadar+	3.5/5 stars
IGN	6/10
PC Gamer (US)	75/100
TechRadar	3.5/5 stars

High on Life 2 received "mixed or average" reviews for the Windows and PlayStation 5 versions while the Xbox Series X/S version received "generally favorable" reviews, according to review aggregator website Metacritic. Fellow review aggregator OpenCritic assessed that the game received fair approval, being recommended by 57% of critics.

In his review for IGN, Travis Northup summarized High on Life 2 as "a fun sequel that expands on the original’s best ideas, including the absurd and memorable boss fights and charming talking guns, while also introducing some neat new concepts", despite also feeling that the game was held back by "its underwhelming story, even sloppier gunplay, and rough technical performance". Rick Lane of Eurogamer said that although he felt that the game's "biggest problem is that its primary mechanic – shooting – remains its weakest element," he concluded that "High on Life 2 has grown up in mostly the right ways, while retaining enough of its goofball personality to be a good hang when it counts".

Independent journalist Nat Collazo reviewed the game for The Nerd Stash and also found it to be entertaining, writing, "Despite its flaws, I had an unimaginably good time with it, and can only compare the joy to the same nostalgia I would have when playing wacky PS2 platformers back in the day."
