= Stick It to the Man! =

2013 video game

- Developer: Zoink
- Publisher: Ripstone
- Platforms: PlayStation 3; PlayStation Vita; Windows; Mac; Xbox One; Wii U; Nintendo Switch
- Release: November 19, 2013: PlayStation 3, PlayStation Vita; WW: November 19, 2013; Windows, Mac; WW: December 13, 2013; Wii U; WW: May 1, 2014; Playstation 4; WW: May 6, 2014; Xbox One; WW: August 27, 2014; Nintendo Switch; WW: November 23, 2017
- Genre: Platform
- Mode: Single-player

Stick It to the Man! is a 2013 action-adventure platform video game developed by Zoink and published by Ripstone for PlayStation 3 and PlayStation Vita (via PSN) on November 19, 2013. It was later also released for Microsoft Windows, PlayStation 4, Wii U, Xbox One and the Nintendo Switch.

The player takes the role of Ray Doewood. A hard hat tester who is returning home from work, after getting hit in the head by a hard object, Ray wakes up from his coma and sees a pink spaghetti-like arm out of his brain. This gives him mind reading and telekinesis powers that allows him to use stickers to manipulate the world around him. After that, Ray gets falsely convicted of a crime he didn't commit and is on the lookout.

== Gameplay ==
Stick It to the Man! is a 2.5D side-scrolling platformer where the player plays as Ray, who can access areas by grabbing a pin from places far away, taking stickers and placing them the appropriate place and reading the minds of various characters by using his pink-spaghetti arm. The player completes puzzles by reading the minds of people that gives the player a hint to where a sticker belongs to progress the game. Though some there are secret agents that chased the player if they noticed you. When the player completes the level’s objectives, the game goes to the next chapter of the game.

== Plot ==
The game takes place in a city that is made of papier-mâché where the protagonist Ray Doewood lives, and works as a hard hat tester. Ray, returning to his apartment from his shift, gets hit by a capsule-like object from the sky. Soon, Ray wakes up from his coma, and finds himself in a hospital confused and leaves the hospital with a pink spaghetti-like arm sticking out of his brain that gives him superpowers. Soon, Ray goes home from a car ride.

The antagonist, The Man, finds out that the capsule is missing, and sends out agents to find and electrocute Ray. At his apartment Ray tells his girlfriend, Arlene, about the pink-arm sticking out his brain, but only to learn that only Ray can actually see the arm out of his brain. Arlene thinks Ray has gone crazy, and recommends that he goes to her psychiatrist Dr. Egglesworth.

Ray finds a depressed Dr. Egglesworth with another psychiatrist, Dr. Brom. Ray helps Dr. Egglesworth's depression by reconnecting him to his late father, whose depression is gone now, but Dr. Brom hears this and thinks he's crazy and sends him to the mental institution. Ray instead, consults Dr. Brom about the pink arm. Dr. Brom thinks Ray has a problem and goes inside of his brain. Soon, inside of the core of Ray's brain, Dr. Brom sees an alien living inside of an untidy room inside of his mind and sends Ray to the psychiatric hospital.

Ray escapes from the mental institution, but gets convicted of a crime he didn't commit and gets falsely accused for murdering his girlfriend Arlene. Ray goes to his apartment and meets The Man, and gets chloroformed by a secret agent. Ray, in a dream themed after The Man, meets the alien again, who Ray names the alien Ted. Ray wakes up from the dream, now strapped to a machine in a military base with The Man, and his secret agent, trying to get Ted out of his head, but the tube ends up sucking in The Man instead.

Ray escapes and finds Arlene tied up, Ray tries to help Arlene, but only for Arlene to tell Ray that it's a trap. The Man and his secret agent now there, informs them that they are in a rocket ship, and they are going to space. Ray gets picked up and punched in the stomach by a secret agent, knocked out. Ray wakes up with him and Ted now captured. The Man, now successfully has the alien to complete his plan to take over the world, but The Man's robot mother interrupts him. Soon the secret agent throws Ray into Space. Arlene swings to break the capsule where Ted is locked in.

The Man gets knocked over, and Ted sends Ray an air tank. Ray floats the planet and opens an airlock. Ray, now saved and reunited with Ted, learns about The Man's childhood, in which they send satellite signals to The Man's mother, talking to Arene about The Man when he was a child, to embarrass The Man. The Man, now angry, breaks open the door where Arlene and The Man's Mother and tells his mother to stop telling people about his childhood. And they both get into an argument. The Man makes a hurtful comment to his mother, which The Man's mother, now sad about the hurtful comment plans on self-destructing.

Ray, now with Arlene hears about the place blowing up. Ted mentions that he knows someone he can contact so they can escape in time. Ray and Ted create a tin-can telephone and Ted communicates with an Alien taxi driver. The Taxi drives by, and they escape before the planet blows up. Ray and Arlene, returned back to their apartment, and Ray and Arlene say goodbye to Ted, who is returning to their home planet. Weeks go by. Ray receives a letter from Ted, who informs Ray that he had "left something" inside his head. Which a pink spaghetti-like arm sticks out of his brain, ending with Ray shouting Arlene's name.

== Reception ==
Reception

Aggregate score
Aggregator	Score
Metacritic	(PS3) 79/100 (PS Vita) 81/100 (PC) 79/100 (PS4) 75/100 (Wii U) 81/100 (Xbox One) 76/100 (Switch) 74/100

Review scores
Publication	Score
Destructoid	9.5/10
Eurogamer	7/10
GameSpot	7/10
IGN	8.6/10
Nintendo Life	7/10
Nintendo World Report	8.5

Stick It to the Man! received generally favorable reviews, with many praising the game for its dialogue, art direction and puzzles. Many compared the game to Psychonauts.

== Notes ==
The song "Just Dropped In (To See What Condition My Condition Was In)" by Kenny Rogers and the First Edition appears in the title screen and the end credits.
