= William Pugh (game designer) =

British game designer

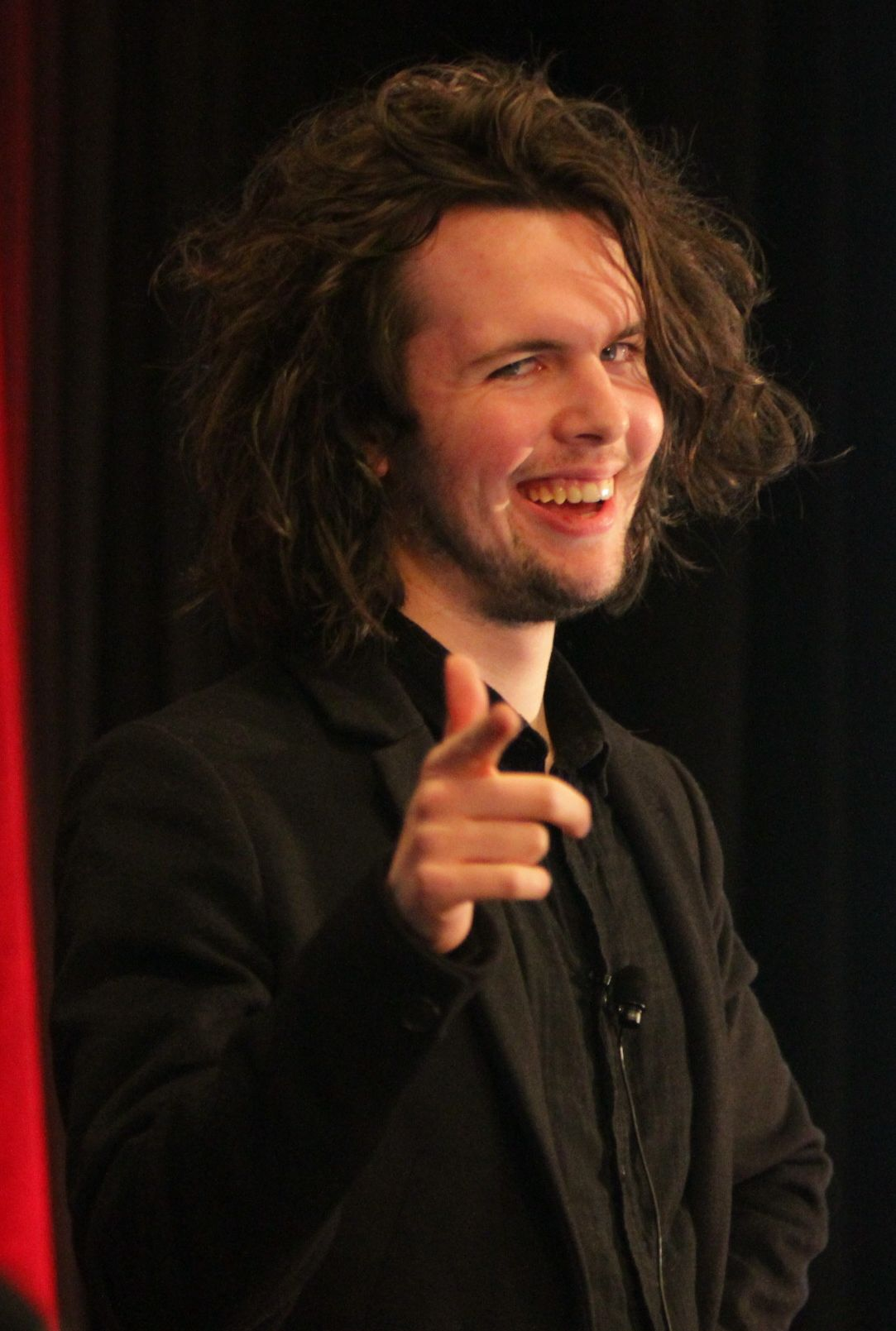
- Pugh presenting at the 2015 Game Developers Conference
- Born: 1994 or 1995 (age 31–32)
- Occupation: Game designer
- Known for: The Stanley Parable
- Awards: Saxxy Award, IGF Audience Award

William Pugh (born 1994/1995) is a British game designer best known for his work on The Stanley Parable, and for founding the game development studio Crows Crows Crows.

== Early life and career ==
William Pugh's parents are art teachers. He developed an interest in video games after playing a Nintendo 64 during a hospital visit when he was six. He studied at the Leeds College of Art for two weeks, but dropped out to work on video games. Pugh taught himself video game environment design through working on modifications, or mods, of video games by Valve. He made levels for Team Fortress 2, campaigns for Left 4 Dead 2, and puzzles in Portal. His work earned him a Saxxy Award, a fan-voted award for Team Fortress 2-based creations.

Pugh first heard of the Source engine mod of Half-Life 2 known as The Stanley Parable from Minecraft creator Markus Persson's Twitter feed. Pugh wanted to work on a larger project and so contacted the mod's creator, Davey Wreden. They decided to work on a remastered, standalone version of The Stanley Parable together. Development of the full game took two years, mainly through remote collaboration software Dropbox and Skype. Pugh started an unnamed development studio following the game's release to work on several projects, saying that "we've got the money and freedom to just go wild, so we've been doing exactly that". Pugh presented on The Stanley Parable's development at the 2015 Game Developers Conference. Reflecting on the game's release, he said he was less interested in the technical work of sound and texture editing, and would instead prefer to outsource those jobs to focus on writing.

=== Crows Crows Crows ===
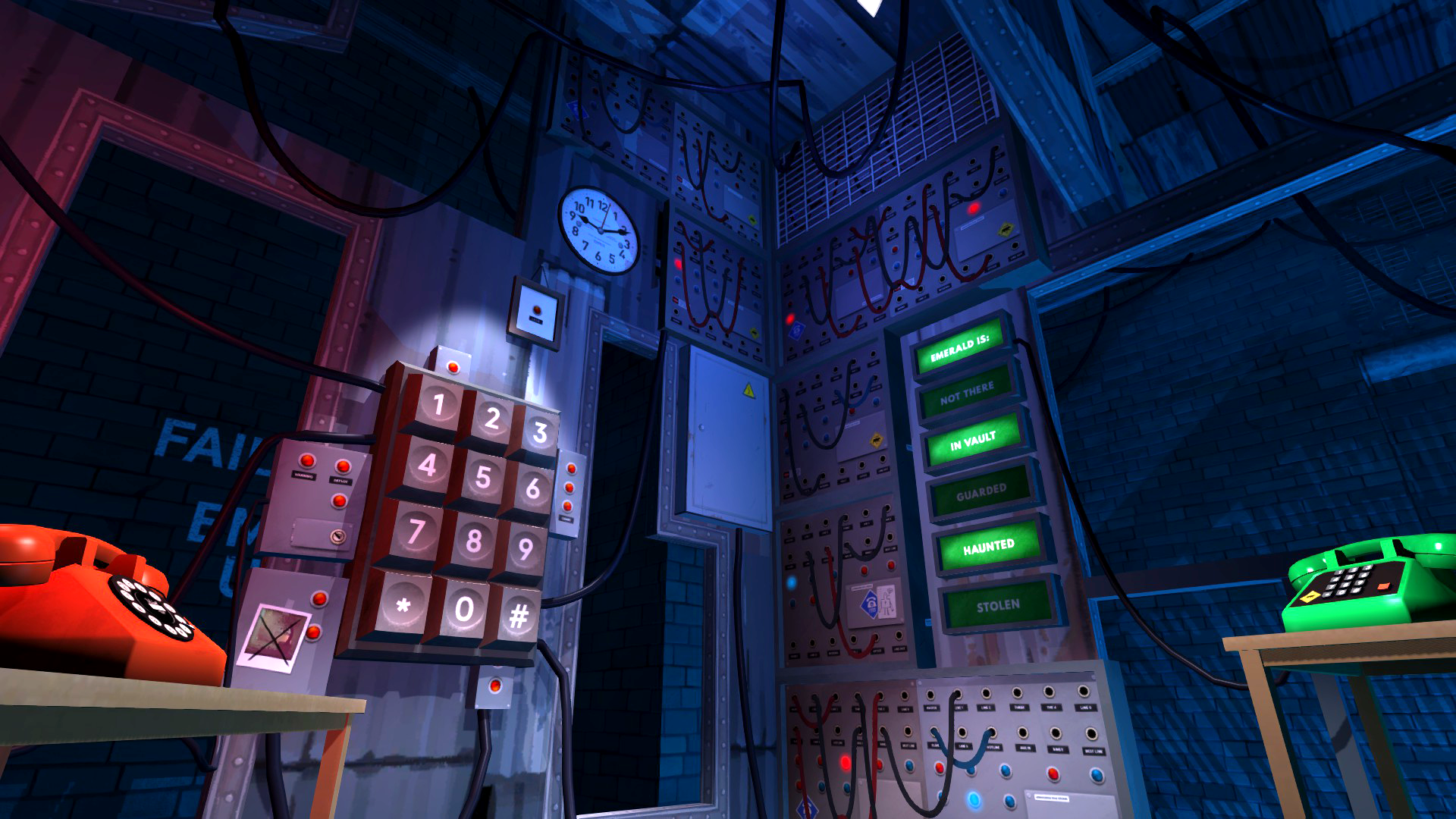
Screenshot of gameplay from Dr. Langeskov

Pugh and collaborator Dominik Johann co-founded the independent video game studio Crows Crows Crows in October 2015. The studio's first game was Dr. Langeskov, The Tiger, and The Terribly Cursed Emerald: A Whirlwind Heist, a free title released in December 2015. The meta-fictional game, in which the player explores and interacts with the backstage elements of a video game demonstration while waiting to play it, includes voice work from Justin Roiland, of Rick and Morty, and Simon Amstell.

Crows Crows Crows has released two other games using the itch.io platform. The Magpie Collection is a series of ten short games by various developers including Pugh, compiled by the studio, which were developed following an IndieGoGo to raise money to help replace equipment stolen from several developers at the 2015 A Maze event in Berlin. The Temple of No, released in June 2016, is a text-based adventure game using the Twine platform.

Roiland announced in September 2015 that he would be working on a virtual reality game for the HTC Vive with Pugh. The collaboration, called Accounting, was released as a free download on Microsoft Windows in 2016. Pugh and Roiland's collaboration began after a chance Twitter conversation in September 2015. Roiland, who was in the proximity of the offices of Respawn Entertainment in California, called out on Twitter if anyone at Respawn was a fan of Rick and Morty and could give him a tour. Pugh reached out to reply, lying about working at Respawn as he was still in the United Kingdom, and offering him a tour. Pugh sent further messages to Roiland feigning that he just missed him, but eventually fessed up. Roiland recognized Pugh's name from The Stanley Parable and was impressed by the whole "weird switcheroonie". Pugh and Johann then flew out to Los Angeles, where they spent a week with Roiland performing a game jam to develop the basics of Accounting, which was then developed into a full game through remote collaboration.

== Works ==
Year	Title	Developer
2013	The Stanley Parable	Galactic Cafe
2015	Dr. Langeskov	Crows Crows Crows
2015	The Magpie Collection	Crows Crows Crows
2016	The Temple of No	Crows Crows Crows
2016	Accounting	Crows Crows Crows/Squanch Games
2017	Accounting+	Crows Crows Crows/Squanch Games
2017	Eat	
2022	The Stanley Parable: Ultra Deluxe	Crows Crows Crows
2026	Hunter's Moon	Twin Swans
