= The Kore Gang =

2010 video game

- Developers: Zoink; SnapDragon Games; Unique Development Studios
- Publishers: EU: Pixonauts; NA: Atari
- Producers: Gustaf Stechmann, Oskar Burman, Christian von Duisburg
- Designers: Klaus Lyngeled, Jan Richter, Stein Llanos
- Programmers: Jonas Priebe, Jens Agby
- Composer: Christian Björklund
- Platform: Wii
- Release: EU: August 11, 2010; NA: November 8, 2011
- Genres: Adventure, Platform
- Mode: Single-player

The Kore Gang: Outvasion from Inner Earth is an action-adventure game for the Wii. The game is notable for its very prolonged development cycle over the course of ten years, during which many different companies became involved and the game moved from being designed for the Xbox console to the Wii.

In the game, the player takes control of three different characters stuck inside robotic suits that amplify their individual abilities. The gameplay is centered on the player's ability to switch between the three characters at any time and thus utilize and combine their abilities to solve puzzles. The story revolves around the Krank Brothers, evil rulers of a civilization that exists in the center of the Earth. The player, with the help of the three playable characters Pixie, Madboy, and Rex, must stop the Kranks from carrying out their plan to conquer the surface of the planet as well. The plot alludes to the subtitle, "Outvasion from Inner Earth".

After being released in August 2010 in Germany through the now-defunct publisher Pixonauts, general international releases followed through distributors such as Atari.

== Plot ==
After a series of earthquakes, a drill-shaped vehicle emerges from the ground, the Krank Tank. It is commanded by the Krank Brothers, who intend to conquer the Earth. Pixie, Madboy and Rex use the Kore Suit, invented by scientist Dr. Samuelsen, to stop the Kranks.

== Development ==
The game was originally conceived by designer Klaus Lyngeled, formerly of Shiny Entertainment. He quit his job at Shiny to found his own company, Zoink, in order to be able to work full-time on this project.

Zoink began to develop a version of the game for the Xbox. In 2003, CDV Software obtained the publishing rights, and planned a release at the end of 2003, but had to drop the project soon after due to financial difficulties. That version was shown on Gamescom 2003.

In 2006, independent production house Games Foundation obtained a license to further develop the game, and announced a version for the Wii.

The PAL version is multi-language and contains English, German, French and Spanish voices-overs.

== Reception ==
Reception

Aggregate score
Aggregator	Score
GameRankings	69.38%

Review scores
Publication	Score
GameSpot	7.5/10
GamesRadar+	3.5/5
IGN	7/10
Nintendo Life	4/10

The game received mixed reviews. Critics such as those for Wiisworld praised the madcap sense of humor and colorful graphics but criticized the clumsy camera control. The game's aggregate score on Metacritic is 70/100.

Alexander Winkel of GameZone gave a game 8.4 out of 10 saying that "Nevertheless, this title is one of the best Wii games and captivates above all with a beautiful art design and a good dose of humor."

Thomas Nickel of Eurogamer had compared the game formula to Banjo-Kazooie, Crash Bandicoot and Rayman.

Lars Peterke of Nintendo WiiX gave it a score of 8.2 out of 10 and compared it to Super Mario Galaxy.
