= Zoink =

Swedish video game developer

Zoink AB
- Type: Subsidiary
- Industry: Video games
- Founded: 2001; 25 years ago
- Founder: Klaus Lyngeled
- Defunct: 2020
- Fate: Merged
- Successor: Thunderful Development
- Headquarters: Gothenburg, Sweden
- Key people: Brjánn Sigurgeirsson (CEO)
- Number of employees: 25 (2018)
- Parent: Thunderful Group (2018–2020)
- Website: zoinkgames.com

Zoink AB was a Swedish video game developer based in Gothenburg. The company was founded by Klaus Lyngeled in 2001 and formed the Thunderful group with Image & Form in 2017. In 2020, Zoink was integrated into Thunderful Development.

== History ==
Zoink was founded in 2001 by Klaus Lyngeled, who acted as its chief executive officer. Lyngeled had initially started developing games when he and some friends produced a pinball game for the Amiga. They later got together with a similar team based in Norrköping and, together, founded Unique Development Studios. When Lyngeled got tired of working for Unique Development Studios, he moved to the United States to work for Shiny Entertainment. He worked on Messiah and Sacrifice but when he began working on Enter the Matrix, he faced, among other things, issues with his visa, wherefore he returned to Sweden, where he founded Zoink. By 2003, Zoink was working on animated films, later advertisement films, and finally advertisement games; clients for the latter included Sony, The Coca-Cola Company, Cartoon Network, and Google. Zoink's first full game was The Kore Gang, revived after its original Xbox version had been cancelled for six years. Zoink's break-out title was Stick It to the Man!, later spawning a spiritual successor, Flipping Death. Bergsala Holding acquired half of Zoink in 2014, after Image & Form's Brjánn Sigurgeirsson introduced Lyngeled to the company. Lyngeled, Sigurgeirsson, and Bergsala Holding decided to merge the two studios and created Thunderful as their parent company in December 2017. In May 2018, Zoink had 25 employees. That year, Zoink released a new game, Fe. Its next title, Lost in Random, was released in 2021. In 2020, Thunderful (now called Thunderful Group) merged Zoink with Image & Form and Guru Games to create Thunderful Development.

== Games developed ==
Year	Title	Platform(s)
2010	The Kore Gang	Wii
2010	WeeWaa	Wii
2010	Billions: Save them All!	Facebook Platform
2012	Reality Fighters Dojo!	Android, iOS
2012	Fair Place	Browser
2012	EnergyMix	Android, iOS
2012	WeeWaa: Rock On!	Android, iOS
2013	Adventure Time: Rock Bandits	Android, iOS
2013	Swing King	Android, iOS
2013	PlayStation All-Stars Island	Android, iOS
2013	Stick It to the Man!	Microsoft Windows, macOS, Nintendo Switch, PlayStation 3, PlayStation 4, PlayStation Vita, Wii U, Xbox One
2015	Zombie Vikings	Microsoft Windows, PlayStation 4, Xbox One
2016	Zombie Vikings: Stab-a-thon	Microsoft Windows
2018	Fe	Microsoft Windows, Nintendo Switch, PlayStation 4, Xbox One
2018	Flipping Death	Microsoft Windows, Nintendo Switch, PlayStation 4, Xbox One
2019	Ghost Giant	PlayStation 4
2021	Lost in Random	Microsoft Windows, Nintendo Switch, PlayStation 4, Xbox One
