= Portal Knights =

2017 video game

- Developer: Keen Games
- Publisher: 505 Games
- Composer: Blake Robinson
- Platforms: Microsoft Windows; PlayStation 4; Xbox One; Nintendo Switch; Android; iOS
- Release: Microsoft Windows; WW: 18 May 2017; PlayStation 4, Xbox One; EU: 19 May 2017; NA: 23 May 2017; Nintendo Switch; WW: 23 November 2017; Android, iOS; WW: 6 December 2017
- Genres: Action role-playing, survival
- Modes: Single-player, multiplayer

Portal Knights is a 2017 action role-playing video game developed by German developer Keen Games and published by 505 Games. It was first released for Microsoft Windows via Steam on 18 May 2017 and subsequently released for PlayStation 4, Xbox One, Nintendo Switch, Android, and iOS.

== History ==
Portal Knights was first announced by publisher 505 Games on 4 February 2016. It was released into Steam Early Access on 25 February 2016.

The game left Early Access on 18 May 2017 and was also released for PlayStation 4 and Xbox One on the same day. It was later released on the Nintendo Switch's eShop on 23 November 2017, and then through retail on 13 February 2018.

The game's first mobile release took place on 6 December 2017, when it was released for both Android and iOS.

In January 2019, the game was featured as one of the free PlayStation 4 games for PlayStation Plus subscribers.

== Gameplay ==
Portal Knights combines exploration and building elements with role-playing aspects. It provides a multiplayer sandbox environment, in which players can explore, fight monsters and build.

The player can craft items such as pickaxes, swords and tools to smash blocks, fight monsters, and construct elaborate buildings, armour and weapons. It shares many similarities with the game Minecraft, both graphically and with the crafting and construction element. The art style of the game was inspired by JRPG games such as the Legend of Zelda series.

The game can be played both alone and with friends, supporting online play with up to 4 players simultaneously in the same world.

There are three major bosses, such as the first boss, the Worm Boss, the Dragon Queen, and the Hollow King.

== Reception ==
Reception

Aggregate score
Aggregator	Score
Metacritic	PC: 72/100; PS4: 71/100; XONE: 77/100; NS: 74/100

Review scores
Publication	Score
Hardcore Gamer	4/5
Nintendo Life	8/10
Nintendo World Report	9/10
Push Square	7/10
The Games Machine (Italy)	8/10

Portal Knights received "mixed or average" reviews for Microsoft Windows, PlayStation 4, and Nintendo Switch, and "generally favorable" reviews for Xbox One.

David Keremes of Nintendo World Report praised the title's vibrant worlds, accessible RPG mechanics, amount of content, and multiplayer, while criticizing the constant item management and unexplained crafting mechanics. Ryan Craddock of Nintendo Life lauded the pleasing art style, crafting options, and cooperative play while taking minor issue with finicky controls and long load times exclusive to the Switch port. Brandon Marlow of Push Square praised Portal Knights' crafting mechanics, combat, and boss battles but deemed the stats system and reliance on RNG as the game's hindrances.

=== Awards ===
In December 2016, Deutscher Entwicklerpreis Awards 2016 selected Portal Knights as their choice for "Best Online Game 2016". The game was also nominated for Deutscher Entwicklerpreis' "Best Game Design", "Best Technical Achievement" and "Best German Game".

In December 2017, Portal Knights received the "Game of the Week" award from TouchArcade.
