= Trover Saves the Universe =

2019 video game

- Developer: Squanch Games
- Publisher: Squanch Games (Note: Physical versions published by Gearbox Publishing)
- Producer: Matty Studivan
- Designer: Erich Meyr
- Programmers: Martin Sweitzer; Nick Weihs
- Artists: Mikey Spano; JD Cragg
- Writers: Spencer McCurnin; Steve Cha
- Engine: Unreal Engine 4
- Platforms: PlayStation 4; Microsoft Windows; Nintendo Switch; Xbox One; Oculus Quest
- Release: May 31, 2019: PlayStation 4; May 31, 2019; Microsoft Windows; June 4, 2019; Nintendo Switch; November 28, 2019; Xbox One; December 3, 2019; Oculus Quest; June 18, 2020
- Genre: Action platformer
- Mode: Single-player

Trover Saves the Universe is a 2019 action platform game developed and published by Squanch Games for Microsoft Windows, PlayStation 4, Nintendo Switch, Xbox One and Oculus Quest. Envisioned as a comedy game, the title features an optional virtual reality component. Justin Roiland, who was the founder of Squanch Games and the co-creator of Rick and Morty, provided voice work for many characters in this game. It received generally positive reviews upon release.

== Gameplay ==
In the game, a being named Glorkon has kidnapped the dogs of the protagonist and sucked their essence into its eye holes, granting him incredible powers that could end the universe. The player assumes control of a nameless Chairorpian, which is "a race of humanoid aliens confined to chairs", and they must rescue their dogs and defeat Glorkon in order to save the universe. Throughout the game, the player is accompanied by Trover, a purple alien monster.

In the game, which is played from a second-person perspective, the player is always holding a video game controller and they issue commands to Trover, telling it to run, jump and attack. As the player progresses, players can upgrade the protagonist's chair and unlock the ability to pick up and throw objects, or levitate between three different height levels. The chair also serves as the game's user interface, displaying information about the player's power and health. Players can also unlock Trover's combat abilities. The game was designed for virtual reality (VR) headsets, though players can still play the game without using a VR headset. The game features five major levels at launch.

== Development ==
The game was developed by Squanch Games, which was founded by Rick and Morty's co-creator Justin Roiland; it was the studio's third game. Trover was mainly designed to be a comedy game, with Tanya Watson, one of Squanch Games' co-founders, adding that "if people don't laugh when we intend for them to laugh, then we know that something isn't working". While Roiland initially believed that the game would be well-received as long as it had good gameplay, as development progressed, he felt that the game "needed to be just as tight and funny as a TV production" because some of the in-game jokes were not working effectively. While Roiland and his team had laid down the foundation of the story, the voice actors were given a lot of room to improvise. Roiland himself also recorded more than 20 hours of lines for the game. The team also observed playtesters' interactions with the game's world, and added additional lines in order to react to these possible actions. However, nearly 40% of the recorded lines were not used in the final game.

Roiland envisioned the title as a virtual reality game after being impressed by VR technology in 2015. Two important goals for the team were to instill a sense of exploration to the game and ensure that players would not get motion sickness while playing. The game is also playable without using a VR headset as the team feared that it would limit the game's audience. According to Roiland, "everything is just as funny and amazing" even when it is played without a VR headset.

The game was announced during Sony Interactive Entertainment's press conference at E3 2018. It was released for PlayStation 4 and PlayStation VR on May 31, 2019. The PC version was released on June 4, 2019. Gearbox Publishing assumed publishing duties for the boxed version. Squanch Games released a trailer featuring Rick Sanchez and Morty Smith from Rick and Morty in June 2019. The developer supported the game with free downloadable content with the release of "Important Cosmic Jobs" and "Jopo Mode" following the game's launch. In November 2019, Squanch Games announced that the game and its DLC would be launching on Nintendo Switch and Xbox One on November 28 and December 3 respectively. An Oculus Quest version was released on June 18, 2020.

On September 22, 2026, the game was delisted from all digital platforms without warning or announcement from Squanch Games.

== Reception ==
Reception

Aggregate score
Aggregator	Score
Metacritic	PC: 80/100; PS4: 76/100

Review scores
Publication	Score
Computer Games Magazine	6/10
Destructoid	7/10
Game Informer	7.75/10
GameSpot	7/10
IGN	8.7/10
Nintendo Life	7/10
PlayStation Official Magazine – UK	7/10

The game received generally positive reviews upon release according to review aggregator website Metacritic. Critics generally agreed that the game was very funny and that it would appeal to fans of the Rick and Morty series, though some reviewers noted that the gameplay was too basic and simple. The game was nominated for Best VR/AR Game at The Game Awards 2019, and Immersive Reality Game of the Year at the 23rd Annual D.I.C.E. Awards.
