= Fe (video game) =

2018 video game

- Developer: Zoink
- Publisher: Electronic Arts
- Directors: Andreas Beijer; Hugo Bille; Klaus Lyngeled
- Producer: Hugo Bille
- Designers: Andreas Beijer; Hugo Bille; Martin Rasmusson
- Programmer: Johan Fröhlander
- Artists: Andreas Beijer; Martin Rasmusson
- Writers: Andreas Beijer; Hugo Bille; Olov Redmalm; Martin Rasmusson; Klaus Lyngeled
- Composer: Joel Bille
- Engine: Unity
- Platforms: Windows; Switch; PlayStation 4; Xbox One
- Release: 16 February 2018
- Genre: Platform-adventure (Metroidvania)
- Mode: Single-player

Fe (/ˈfiːjə/ FEE-yə, Swedish: [ˈfeː]; Fairy) is a platform-adventure game developed by Zoink and published by Electronic Arts under its EA Originals program. It was released on February 16, 2018, for Microsoft Windows, Nintendo Switch, PlayStation 4 and Xbox One. In it, the player controls Fe, a fox-like creature in a forest setting, attempting to defend it from hostile entities called the Silent Ones, gaining help from other forest creatures by guiding them to complete tasks and learning new abilities from those it helps.

Fe is the first game in the EA Originals series, which is EA's program created to promote indie developers. The game was inspired by the developers' recollections of Nordic forests, as well as games such as Journey and Shadow of the Colossus.

== Gameplay ==
Fe is a Metroidvania-style action-adventure game in which the player controls Fe, a fox-like creature within a forest that is highly responsive to the songs of the creatures and plants within it. The forest creatures are being attacked by entities called the Silent Ones for unknown reasons that threaten the forest's wildlife. Fe is able to sing to other creatures and objects to gain their help. These creatures can teach Fe a new song which gives the fox additional abilities through the forest, such as activating a flower that acts as a jump-pad to launch Fe to higher locations and explore more of the world.

The game has been noted to have minimal instructions, requiring the player to experiment and to perceive the forest's ecosystem to determine how to progress, instead of a set of objectives. One example requires the player to observe that one species of bird likes a certain type of flower, suggesting that they may be able to use the bird's song to interact in a different manner than if they used the flower's song. Fe has been favorably compared to Abzû, Journey and Shadow of the Colossus for this "hands-off" approach to gameplay.

== Development ==
Fe, named after the Swedish language term for fairy, was developed by the Swedish-based studio Zoink. The studio's chief executive officer, Klaus Lyngeled, called the title "a personal narrative about our relationship with nature" and to emphasize that "everything in this world is connected". Most of the team grew up near forests and frequently played within them, getting close to the wildlife there, while overcoming fears of the deeper forests being scary places. Creative director Hugo Bille said they wanted to stay true to the recollection of their Nordic forests, populated by creatures with no spoken language. Bille said games like Journey and Shadow of the Colossus were inspiration, and that they always wanted to capture the exploration mechanics of games in the Metroid and Zelda series.

Fe was first announced during the EA Play event occurring alongside the E3 2016 in June of that year. It was presented as the first of "EA Originals", a new segment of EA's publishing aimed to help indie developers with financing and publishing of their titles to reach a wider audience without EA being as involved in the game's development, thus allowing the studio to take more of a share of sales revenues. The game was later featured in a playable demo form at the 2017 Gamescom exposition in August 2017, along with the target release of 16 February 2018 for Microsoft Windows, Nintendo Switch, PlayStation 4 and Xbox One.

== Reception ==
Reception

Aggregate score
Aggregator	Score
Metacritic	(NS) 72/100 (PC) 73/100 (PS4) 70/100 (XONE) 70/100

Review scores
Publication	Score
Destructoid	5/10
Electronic Gaming Monthly	7/10
Game Informer	5.5/10
GameRevolution	4.5/5
GameSpot	7/10
GamesRadar+	3.5/5
IGN	6.5/10
Nintendo Life	8/10
Nintendo World Report	9/10
Polygon	8.5/10
The Guardian	2/5
VideoGamer.com	7/10

Fe received "mixed or average" reviews, according to video game review aggregator platform Metacritic.

Polygon liked the freeform nature of exploration "Unlike most 3D platform games, Fe refuses to grab me by the shoulders and point me in any particular direction. It doesn't indicate what I ought to actually be doing. It just lets me wander around its pretty gardens". Game Informer felt that art style was bland and confused the player, "With the myriad spikes, every creature in the game looks like an enemy... Every area of the forest also feels similar, even if the color scheme is working overtime to try and make locations feel distinct". While liking the themes of the story, Rock Paper Shotgun criticized how the game felt aimless at points, "As a consequence of Fe's desire to be open and ambiguous in its presentation, it's also surprisingly directionless in its opening moments. I love freedom and open worlds, but I always feel a bit overwhelmed, almost agoraphobic, when there's not even a given reason for going anywhere. GamesRadar+ enjoyed the traversal mechanics and the design of the semi-open world, "The world developer Spoink has created is incredible, and regularly takes your breath away if you let it".

The Guardian disliked how the player interacted with plants, writing "The idea of communicating with nature through song is a beautiful one, but the execution is inconsistent. It's fiddly to keep switching between languages... and the beauty of the idea boils down to barking orders at voice-activated plants". While finding some of the game's mechanics interesting on paper, Eurogamer criticized the platforming, calling it "fidgety" and "dissatisfying". Destructoid felt both the story and world were too ambiguous for their own good, "Despite having seen the entirety of the forest several times over, I'm still not actually familiar with any single part of it — much less adept at effortlessly traversing it. There's a clear conflict, but it's unclear why it exists or how we're progressing toward resolution". The Washington Post wrote that despite early promise, the game didn't have a strong conclusion, "though I was initially intrigued by the fragmentary way the backstory is presented, I found the payoff at the end less than mesmerizing".

Nintendo World Report praised the atmosphere that Fe created, "Each area of the forest has a unique color palette that does well representing the feeling around you. Early on, different hues of blue are contrasted with the colourful pinks and purples of the flora around you. Even the music is perfectly matched to the mood". Nintendo Life enjoyed the way the game approached topics wordlessly, saying "It's a bold move to have a game completely void of dialogue or a text-driven narrative, but it's a decision that works because Fe... uses the simple yet poignant themes of its story to drive it forward". GameSpot liked the game's industrial enemies, singling out how they changed the tone, "Those moments of peace--by way of the harmonies you've made with other creatures--are shattered quickly and easily by Fe's inorganic enemies, whose harsh industrial lights and abrasive noises pierce the solemn orchestral music of the forest... It's not hard to stay stealthy and save yourself, but you'll end up watching at least once as the friendly animals you had in tow get captured one by one--and it's heartbreaking".
