= Accounting (video game) =

2016 video game

- Developers: Crows Crows Crows; Squanch Games
- Publisher: Crows Crows Crows
- Directors: Justin Roiland; William Pugh
- Producers: Tanya Watson; Kevin Patterson
- Artist: Dominik Johann
- Writers: Justin Roiland; William Pugh
- Composer: Tom Schley
- Engine: Unity
- Platforms: Windows, PlayStation 4, Oculus Quest
- Release: WW: October 18, 2016
- Genre: Adventure
- Mode: Single-player

Accounting is a virtual reality video game by Crows Crows Crows and Squanch Games. It was released for SteamVR in 2016. An updated version, Accounting+, was released for PlayStation VR on December 19, 2017, for Windows on October 18, 2018, and Oculus Quest on July 3, 2019.

== Gameplay and plot ==
The player is introduced in a small basement office by two accountants (William Pugh and Dominik Johann) through a phone call as a candidate for a new "virtual reality accounting" experiment, which supposedly increases efficiency in accounting: the player is invited to put on (in-game) a VR helmet. The player is then teleported to a small idyllic meadow, but that's interrupted by a puffy white creature sticking out of a tree hollow (Justin Roiland) throwing insults and profanity at the player for showing up uninvited. The accountants contact the player through a landline phone and express their panic about the experiment going wrong, while the player can use a nearby VR helmet to go one level deeper into virtual reality. The player arrives in an alleyway where four animal-like gangsters Ging (Cassie Steele), Zing (Rich Fulcher), Ming (Vatche Panos), and Ding (Roiland) are holding a profanity-laden conversation. The gang name the player 'Scooter' and exhort him to do illegal acts until the player throws a brick through a window, alerting the police. Using Ding's posterior as a headset, the player then escapes to a dungeon, meeting The King of VR (Panos), another puffy obese creature, who is initially friendly but gradually turns insulting; the player stabs and disembowels the King, and pulls out yet another VR helmet from its body to go one level deeper. In the next world, a player finds a xylophone made out of bones, with two chatty skulls (Roiland and Steele) attached, who urge the player to use other bones to play the xylophone, appearing to have some sort of sexual satisfaction if the player does so and disappointment if the player stops. In a cabinet behind the player, a small jar of acid is found: drinking it causes the player to die. In the PlayStation VR and SteamVR version, a coin in the cabinet can be used to enter a door, transporting the player to a room with two fast-food addicted demon worshippers (Chelsea Kane and Roiland). They help the player to summon Satan with the help of a rap mixtape performed by Casper. After the player eats a plate of feces, Satan arrives and squashes everyone.

Either way, the player dies and arrives back one layer in virtual reality, where the player is on trial for killing The King. Though the player has access to a variety of Little Public Defenders (Echo Kellum, Kane, and Scott Chernoff), tiny egg-like defense lawyers who argue the player's innocence, picking them up and throwing them around will upset the judge (Roiland) who orders the player's execution via guillotine. The player arrives one layer back in reality in the car of the animal gang. They are fleeing the police and Ding is dead; soon after Ging and Ming die as well. Zing, the driver, encourages you to shoot the fleeing police with a 'seed gun' which causes their cars to explode. The shootout ends with the player defeating the chief of police, a robot pirate captain (Joe Finegold). Zing dies by the player's hand, and the car crashes. Then the player appears in the meadow again, but it's entirely on fire, and the tree person angrily orders the player to keep a talking bomb (Arin Hanson) away from the blaze. The player is too late, however, and the bomb explodes, killing the player once again and bringing them back to the basement, where the accountants express their joy about the successful experiment, and the end credits are displayed on a whiteboard. The player can at this point find a loaded gun in a drawer and shoot themselves in the head, which then removes the final layer of (actual) virtual reality and ends the game. If the player chooses to flip the whiteboard after the accountants finish their dialogue, it leaves you with a special message from Reggie Watts.

Throughout the game, the player can interact with a variety of objects, which don't change the outcome of the game, and most characters will continue their dialogue indefinitely. Accounting+ features a tutorial hosted by the soft-spoken narrator Clovis (Pugh) and a hidden level where a clown in a waterpark control room rants about another hidden level.
