= The Stanley Parable =

2013 video game

- Cover art for The Stanley Parable, featuring the Droste effect on the computer monitor
- Developer: Galactic Cafe
- Publisher: Galactic Cafe
- Designers: Davey Wreden; William Pugh
- Programmer: Jesús Higueras
- Artist: Andrea Jörgensen
- Writers: Davey Wreden; William Pugh
- Composers: Blake Robinson; Yiannis Ioannides; Christiaan Bakker
- Engine: Source
- Platforms: Windows; macOS; Linux; PlayStation; Xbox; Nintendo Switch; iOS
- Release: October 17, 2013: Windows; October 17, 2013; macOS; December 19, 2013; Linux; September 9, 2015; Playstation, Xbox, Nintendo Switch; April 27, 2022; iOS; October 7, 2024
- Genre: Adventure
- Mode: Single-player

The Stanley Parable is a 2013 story-based video game designed and written by developers Davey Wreden and William Pugh. In the game, the player guides a silent protagonist named Stanley alongside narration by British actor Kevan Brighting. As the story progresses, the player is confronted with diverging pathways. The player may contradict the directions of Brighting's ''The Narrator'', which, if disobeyed, will be incorporated into the story. Depending on the choices made, the player will encounter different endings before the game resets to the beginning.

The Stanley Parable was originally released on July 31, 2011, as a free modification for Valve's Half-Life 2 by Wreden. Together with Pugh, Wreden later released a stand-alone remake using the Source engine under the Galactic Cafe studio name. The remake recreated many of the original mod's choices while adding new areas and story pathways, as well as overhauling the game's graphics entirely. It was announced and approved via Steam Greenlight in 2012, and was released on October 17, 2013, for Windows. Later updates to the game added support for macOS on December 19, 2013, and for Linux on September 9, 2015. An expanded edition titled The Stanley Parable: Ultra Deluxe was released on April 27, 2022. It is currently available on consoles, in addition to previously supported platforms, and includes additional content and improved graphics. An iOS port of Ultra Deluxe was released on October 7, 2024.

Both the original mod and its two remakes received critical acclaim and commercial success. Reviewers praised the game's narrative and commentary on player choice and decision-making. The game sold over one million copies within a year of release and is regarded as one of the greatest video games ever made. The game and its themes of choice, the relationship between a game creator and player, and predestination/fate have been the subject of significant analysis.

== Gameplay and synopsis ==
=== The Stanley Parable (2013) ===
The player has a first-person perspective, and can travel and interact with certain elements of the environment, such as pressing buttons or opening doors, but has no combat or other action-based controls. The Narrator presents the story to the player. He explains that the protagonist Stanley is employee 427 in an office building. Stanley is tasked to monitor data coming from a computer screen and press buttons appropriately without question. One day, the screen monitoring data goes blank, which has never happened before. Stanley, unclear on what to do, begins to explore the building and discovers that the workplace is completely abandoned. At this stage, the story splits off in numerous possibilities, based on the player's choices. When the player comes to an area where a choice is possible, the player can opt to follow the Narrator's directions or perform the opposing action. The initial decision is a set of two open doors. (Note: Technically speaking, the first choice in the game is choosing whether or not to lock Stanley's office door, in which locking it results in a unique ending, but the choice between the two doors is the first one that is obviously presented to the player.) The Narrator notes that Stanley traveled through the leftmost door, but this has not yet occurred. The Narrator takes the player's choices into account, reacting with new narration or attempts to return the player back to the target path if he is contradicted. For example, if the player were to follow the Narrator's directions and pass through the leftmost door, the story of the missing employees proceeds. Alternatively, the player can choose the rightmost door, causing the Narrator to adjust his story. In this case, he will urge the player to return to the "proper" path, although the player can continuously disobey the Narrator, resulting in other adjustments to the story. In some instances, the Narrator breaks the fourth wall when reacting to the player's decisions.

In the original 2011 mod, there were six different endings. Wreden stated it would take about an hour for the player to experience them all. The 2013 remake added more than ten endings, altered some pre-existing endings and the respective routes to trigger them, as well as several Easter eggs, and other choice-related aspects.

=== The Stanley Parable: Ultra Deluxe (2022) ===
Ultra Deluxe expands on the game's endings further, including further routes, new environments, and additional endings. Players can select an option stating they have played the game before in order to access the new content quicker, as otherwise it takes playing several endings before the new content becomes accessible to the player. The player, as Stanley, discovers a new area of the game proclaiming "new content", among which is a bucket that can be used to alter the game's various endings. Another potential route added has the Narrator guide Stanley to a new area called the Memory Zone, which recounts all the praise that The Stanley Parable had gotten, but soon finds an area full of Steam (referred to as "Pressurized Gas" in the console and handheld versions) user reviews that are critical of the game, which leads the Narrator to further distress that The Stanley Parable was not good enough. Once all new content is completed, which includes a route in which Stanley discovers "The Stanley Parable 2" has received a negative critical response, the title screen will change to depict the new title, with no new further changes to content.

== Development ==
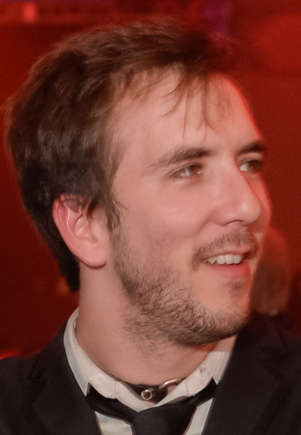
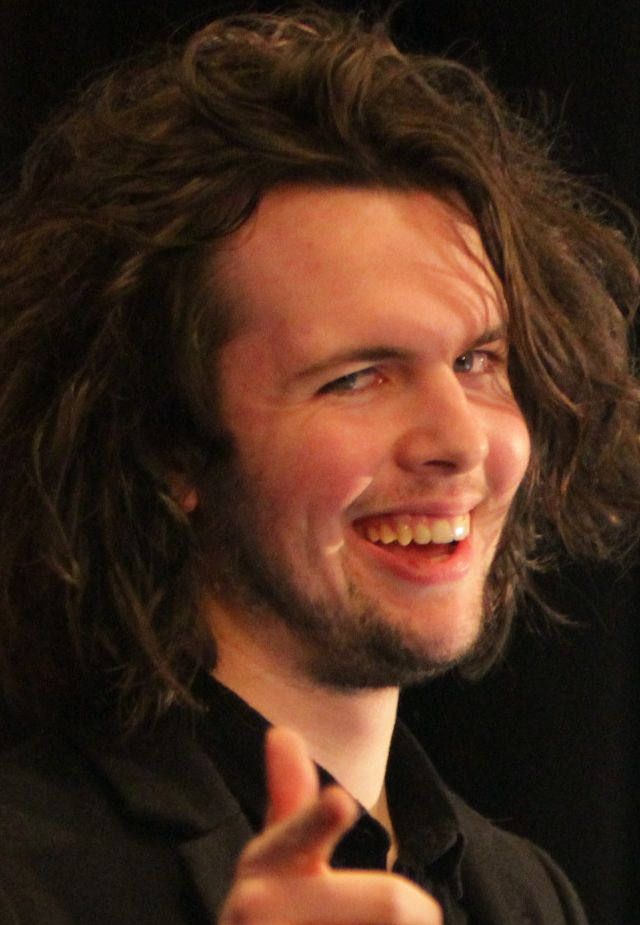
The Stanley Parable was created by Davey Wreden (left) and William Pugh (right).

The original Stanley Parable was released as a mod of Half-Life 2. Davey Wreden, 22 years old at the time of the mod's release, was inspired to create The Stanley Parable about three years prior, after considering the typical storytelling narratives within video games, and thinking of what would happen if the player would go against that narration; he also saw this as a means towards his planned career as a game developer. As a video game player, Wreden found that most major triple-A titles at the time made many assumptions about the player's experience and fitted that within the game, and rarely provided answers for "what if" questions that the player may consider. Wreden believed that recent games with more engaging or thought-provoking stories, including the Metal Gear Solid series, Half-Life 2, Portal, Braid, and BioShock, started to approach this void, giving reason for the player to stop and think about the narration instead of simply going through the motions. Though his initial intent was a personal project simply to try to make such a game that asked the questions about why people play video games, Wreden found that there were other gamers that had been considering the same type of questions. He set out to make a game that would be the subject of discussion for players after they completed it. According to Wreden, his design document for the game was "Mess with the player's head in every way possible, throwing them off-guard, or pretending there's an answer and then kinda whisking it away from in front of them." Wreden decided to use an "unconventional narrator" in order to work with the idea of what would happen if the player elected to disobey the narrator.

With no prior experience working with the Source engine, Wreden relied heavily on information and help from wikis and forums on the Source Development Kit, teaching himself the fundamentals. Outside of Kevan Brighting's voice-over contributions, The Stanley Parable was all Wreden's work. Wreden used an audition process to find a narrator, and found Brighting's submission to be ideal for the game. Brighting had provided his voice in a single pass. Wreden wanted to keep the game short so as to allow players to experience all the endings without spending an excessive amount of time replaying the game. The shortness of the game would also allow him to introduce ridiculous and nonsensical endings, such as "and then everything was happy!", that would otherwise insult the player as a poor reward for completing a long game. Most of the ideas he had envisioned for the game were included, though some had to be dropped due to his inability to figure out how to work with them within the Source engine. In one case, Wreden wanted to include a point where the player would have to press buttons as the narration and screen prompts would have said, but could not figure out how to bind keyboard input to do this, but left the element in there as a "broken" puzzle; he later was praised for this, as to players, this gave the impression of lacking control during the stage of narration. Despite the success of completing the game, Wreden considered the overall project "grueling" and stifling of his career ambition, noting that his efforts became more intense once he started learning of other players' interest in the title.

Wreden initially tested the game with a friend before posting the mod to the website ModDB on July 31, 2011, a few weeks prior to his graduation from college. After graduating, Wreden had left for Australia with intent to open a video game-themed bar similar to the Mana Bar, which he had worked at for about a year, but his future plans changed with success of the mod. Wreden had started to receive various offers from others to help work on new games as well as some job offers from larger developers which he turned down, as at the time it was "not the kind of scene" he wanted to work in. Instead, he started to gather other independent programmers to work out an improved version of The Stanley Parable and leading towards a completely new title in the future.

=== 2013 remake ===
The "Mind Control Facility" in both the 2011 mod (top) and the 2013 remake (bottom). The mod's environment was primarily created by Wreden using default models in the Source engine, but Pugh helped to significantly improve the game's assets for the remake.

Shortly after the release of the original mod, Wreden was contacted by William Pugh, a player who had experience in creating environments within the Source engine and had previously won a Saxxy Award for his work. Pugh had heard of the mod through word of mouth, and after being impressed with playing it, saw that Wreden was looking for help for improving the mod. The two collaborated each day for two years for the revamped mod. Though initially Wreden wanted to recreate the original game "beat for beat", his discussions with Pugh led to them deciding to alter existing material and add more, an "interpolation" of the original game, and creating a stand-alone title. The remake includes the six endings from the original, as well as updating the game with several newly created endings. Brighting returned to voice the Narrator in the remake, as Wreden considered his performance "half the reason this game has been successful". Additionally, a custom soundtrack was created for the remake, composed by Blake Robinson, Yiannis Ioannides, and Christiaan Bakker.

Pugh collaborated with Wreden on The Narrator's script, with each of them adding elements that would then be tweaked and expanded upon by the other. One would also make changes to the environment, which another would then use to flesh out The Narrator's personality. Wreden stated that the first scene where the player can make a choice—in which The Narrator states Stanley went through the left door while the player can elect to also choose the right door—was designed carefully to make sure players did not see anything wrong with the moment, wanting the choice to be made by the player of their own agency and thinking. Pugh additionally noted The Narrator's bias in constructing a story played a role in the game's development in terms of the office's visual appearance, stating that the lack of various usual office-based objects would be the result of the narrator not considering to include unimportant functional items. Davey Wreden stated that the game was about the relationship between the player and The Narrator, with Wreden saying: "I don't think it's a power struggle between you and me, but I also don't think it's really a power struggle between Stanley and the narrator. Ultimately, these things are trying to understand one another, but they're having great difficulty doing so." He additionally noted that the potential for reconciliation between the player and The Narrator was always there, but entirely dependent on how players choose to play the game. According to Wreden, the split between those who elect to follow The Narrator's advice and those who do not was around a "fifty-fifty split".

In play-testing the newer version, Pugh found that players did not respond well to having a preconceived idea of where the divergent points in the game took place, as represented by a flowchart early in the game, and this was taken out. However, Pugh also found that without some visual cues as to where divergent paths occurred, they would often miss these choices, and so added elements like colors to highlight that a choice was available at these points. In the original modification, one route has the player travel to sections modeled after elements in Half-Life 2. In the remake, Pugh and Wreden included one route where the player is dropped into a Minecraft world, and another where the player briefly revisits the opening of Portal, before being trapped in the original 2011 mod version of The Stanley Parable. These routes were included after getting approval from their creators Markus Persson and Valve, respectively.

To distribute the new version, the team initially considered a pay what you want scheme, but later sought the use of the Steam Greenlight service, where independent developers can solicit votes from other players in order to have Valve subsequently offer the title through Steam. In October 2012, the game was successfully approved by Valve to be included on Steam upon the game's completion. Although Wreden originally called the stand-alone version The Stanley Parable: HD Remix, he later opted to drop the distinguishing title, affirming that he believed the remake is the "definitive" version of the game. The macOS version (requiring 10.8 or later) was later released on December 19, 2013, expanding to support for Linux on September 9, 2015.

In August 2016, Galactic Cafe partnered with IndieBox, a monthly subscription box service, to create an exclusive, custom-designed, physical release of the game. This limited collector's edition included a DRM-free game CD, the official soundtrack, an instruction manual, a Steam key, and various collectibles including an "Adventure Tie" and "Existential Mousepad".

==== The Stanley Parable Demo ====
Wreden and Pugh announced that the remake would be released on Steam on October 17, 2013, and accompanied the announcement with a playable demo. Instead of a traditional demo in which the player is shown a small section of the full game, The Stanley Parable Demo features entirely original content, which was developed to give the player the flavor of the game, using similar concepts of misconceptions and non-linear storytelling that would be present in the final game. The developers found that using a section of the game, taken out of context, left play-testers confused and annoyed with no understanding of that section without including the prior monologues. Wreden stated "the best way to convey what our game is about is through an additional piece of content, completely separate from the main game, that carries the style and tone of the main game without actually spoiling it." This includes a section modeled after a waiting room, which was one of the first elements designed for the demo. According to Wreden, "It catalyzed this sense that even very mundane tasks like sitting in a waiting room are fun if they're not what you're ‘supposed' to be doing".

Personalized versions of the demos were created by Wreden for Game Grumps and Adam Sessler of Revision3 for Let's Play to promote the 2013 remake. These editions included some rerecorded lines directed at these players; Wreden considered that based on the higher-than-average viewership for these videos that this helped towards marketing of the game, and that the demo received similar coverage as the full title. This effectively helped generate media buzz equal to two game titles for the next two months of work it took to create the specialized demo.

=== Ultra Deluxe ===
The Stanley Parable: Ultra Deluxe
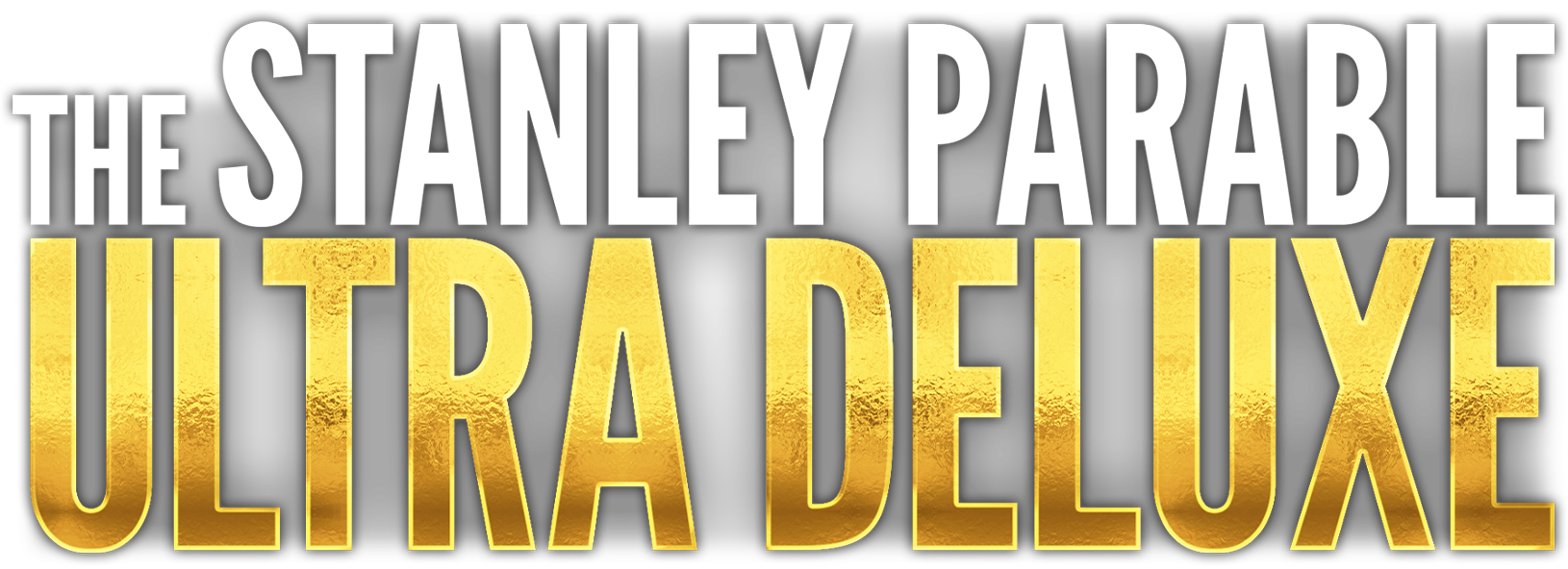
- Developer: Crows Crows Crows
- Publisher: Crows Crows Crows
- Director: William Pugh
- Designers: Davey Wreden; William Pugh
- Artist: Dominik Johann
- Writers: Davey Wreden; William Pugh
- Composers: Tom Schley: Titouan Millet; Alina Johann; Dominik Johann; William Pugh
- Engine: Unity
- Platforms: List of platforms: Linux; macOS; Nintendo Switch; PlayStation 4; PlayStation 5; Windows; Xbox One; Xbox Series X/S; iOS
- Release: April 27, 2022; iOS; October 7, 2024

At The Game Awards 2018, an expanded edition of the game entitled The Stanley Parable: Ultra Deluxe was announced. It was planned for release in 2019 for existing platforms and for consoles. Ultra Deluxe is a joint release by Galactic Cafe and Pugh's Crows Crows Crows. The game was ported to the Unity game engine to support consoles. Additional content was added to this version as well. In November 2019, the studios announced their decision to delay Ultra Deluxe with a mid-2020 release. To generate interest in Ultra Deluxe, the 2013 remake was made available for free for a limited time in March 2020 on the Epic Games Store.

The game was further delayed to 2021 due to the COVID-19 pandemic. In December 2021, the game's publisher Crows Crows Crows announced that the game would be further delayed and would be released in early 2022. Wreden has gone on to state that the script for Ultra Deluxe's new content is longer than the script of the entire original game. The section of the game that featured Minecraft and Portal now features levels based on Firewatch and Rocket League. The game was released on April 27, 2022, for Nintendo Switch, PlayStation 4 and 5, Xbox One, and Xbox Series X/S, in addition to Windows, macOS, and Linux through Steam, with owners of the 2013 remake on Steam receiving a discount on Ultra Deluxe for the first two weeks of release. An iOS port was released in October 2024.

== Critical reception ==
Within two weeks of its release, the mod was downloaded more than 90,000 times. Responses of most players were positive, and Wreden became "an overnight internet sensation among hardcore gamers".

The Stanley Parable mod was acclaimed by journalists as a thought-provoking game, praising it for being a highly experimental game that only took a short amount of time for the player to experience. Many journalists encouraged players to experience the game themselves, desiring to avoid spoilers that would affect the player's experience, and to offer discussions about the game within their sites' forums. Ben Kuchera of Ars Technica noted that while the game purportedly gives the player choice, many of these end up lacking an effect, as "to feel like you're in more control than you are". Brighting's voice work was considered a strong element, providing the right dry British wit to the complex narration. The game was listed as an honorable mention for the Seumas McNally Grand Prize and "Excellence in Narrative" award at the 15th Annual Independent Games Festival. The Stanley Parable received the Special Recognition award at IndieCade 2012.

=== 2013 remake ===
Reception (Remake)

Aggregate score
Aggregator	Score
Metacritic	88/100

Review scores
Publication	Score
Eurogamer	9/10
Game Informer	8.5/10
GameSpot	9/10
IGN	8.8/10
PC Gamer (UK)	90/100
Polygon	9/10
Slant Magazine	80/100
Hardcore Gamer	4.5/5
The Daily Telegraph	4.5/5
The Observer	5/5

The 2013 remake has received critical acclaim from reviewers. At Metacritic, as of March 2020, the game holds an 88/100 score based on 47 critic reviews. Forbes listed Wreden in its 2013 "30 Under 30" leaders in the field of games for the success and marketing of The Stanley Parable. For his work on the game, William Pugh was named as one of 18 "Breakthrough Brits" for 2014 by BAFTA.

Some critics focused on the game's themes of existentialism. Ashton Raze of The Telegraph considered that the game "offers ... a look at, not a critique of ... the nature of narrative construction" that can be a factor in other video games. The remake won the Audience Award and was nominated in the categories of "Excellence in Narrative" and "Excellence in Audio" along with being named as a finalist for the Seumas McNally Grand Prize for the 2014 Independent Games Festival Awards. The game was nominated for "Best Story", "Best Debut Game", and "Game Innovation" awards for the 2014 BAFTA Video Games Awards, while Brighting's performance was nominated for the "Performer" award. At the 2013 National Academy of Video Game Trade Reviewers (NAVGTR) awards the game won Writing in a Comedy and Performance in a Comedy, Lead (Kevan Brighting as Narrator). During the 17th Annual D.I.C.E. Awards, the Academy of Interactive Arts & Sciences nominated The Stanley Parable for "Downloadable Game of the Year", "Outstanding Innovation in Gaming", and "Outstanding Character Performance" for the Narrator.

Wreden reported that more than 100,000 sales were made within the first three days of being available; this was far more revenue than he was expecting, considering that sales from these three days would be enough to allow him to live comfortably and become a full-time developer for the next five years. The game had sold over one million copies in less than a year. The game's demo was received similarly well, and Wreden considered it a key part in the full game's success. IGN's Luke Reilly listed The Stanley Parable's demo as one of the top six demos in video games, citing how it is "an entirely standalone exercise designed to prepare [the player] for the unique player and narrator relationship that forms the core of The Stanley Parable experience".

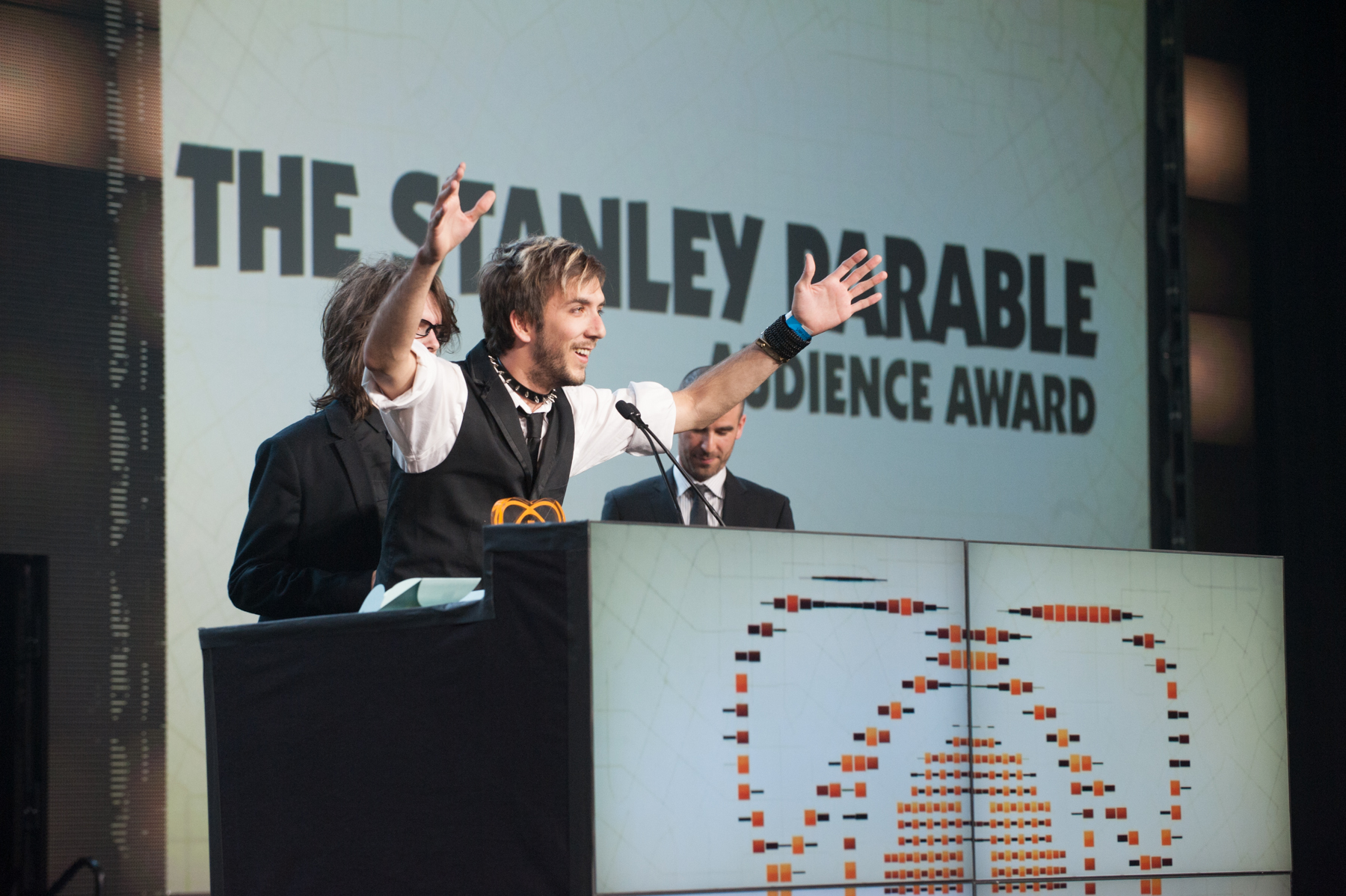
The Stanley Parable won the Audience Award at the Independent Games Festival Awards.

A patch was later released for the game shortly after its release to replace imagery used in a 1950s-style instructional video that some players found racially offensive, with Wreden writing "[W]e always wanted the game to be something that could be played by anyone of any age. If a person would feel less comfortable showing the game to their children then I've got no problem helping fix that!" Following the remake, Wreden began developing his next title, The Beginner's Guide, which was released in October 2015, while Pugh set up the independent studio Crows Crows Crows. Their first game was Dr. Langeskov, The Tiger, and The Terribly Cursed Emerald: A Whirlwind Heist, released in December 2015.

=== Analysis ===
The book The Ethics of Playing, Researching, and Teaching Games in the Writing Classroom analyzed the game as an example of a game "that speaks to other games". They noted that the game's lack of agency for the player in conjunction with its many branching pathways characterized the game as one that had significant tension between the will of the game and the will of the player. They further stated that by building the game around the single ethical question of the entire game being constructed prior to the player's arrival, the player is not merely playing the game, but experimenting with it in an attempt to test their own agency against the game's ethos. It analyzed one ending, in which Stanley is locked in a room with a bomb that will explode once the timer reaches zero with no way to disarm it, due to how it characterized the game's ethos, noting how it punished players for thinking outside of the box and caused players to question the game's true purpose. Another part of the game, known as "The Baby Game", in which Stanley must press a button repeatedly to stop a baby from walking into an incinerator, was also analyzed for the ethical question of whether the player's choices to save the baby had any actual meaning, or whether the player was being manipulated the whole time. The game has been analyzed by the book Fictionality, Factuality, and Reflexivity Across Discourses and Media for drawing attention to how the game itself is presented, noting that due to how the game's narrative is perceived, it touches on the connection between fiction and reality. The "Confusion" ending where the Narrator and Stanley encounter the wall featuring all of the Narrator's dialogue was used to show the game's own self-awareness of its narrativity and how the story itself follows a linear path that cannot be altered, even by those who seem to be in control within the game's narrative. It further analyzed the game's own interactivity, noting the game's own self-imposed divide between Stanley's identity and the player's allowed the game to weave the real world and the fictional one into the same narrative. It analyzed the game's "Freedom" ending, in which Stanley disables the mind control facility and walks outside to freedom. The book analyzed the game's own self-irony in how the Narrator directly tells Stanley how to feel in the situation, and how, in order to "free" Stanley, the player must relinquish control, thus disabling the player's own freedom of choice and making them unable to be free as a consequence.

The book Against Flow: Video Games and the Flowing Subject analyzed how the game attempted to make the player stop and question their reasons for playing the game, something most other games attempted to prevent, noting how while this would be assumed to stop the flow of the game, it instead encouraged it due to the game's self-reflexive nature. It also stated how while the game attempted to create a "playful" atmosphere in how it approached its narrative, it also "turned a critical eye on play itself", analyzing it as a "deeply ironic game" that punctuated and satirized how games are seen as a form of escapism. They further stated that while the game's medium criticized the structure of video games as a whole, it also encouraged further intimacy with the concept in how it presented its narrative. The game was additionally analyzed in the context of its narrative versus its story, due to the game's active illusion of choice and free will that make the story otherwise inaccessible. It stated that despite its encouragement to participate in the construction of the story, the game was still restricted by the foundation it was built on, noting how players could only continue on the plan given to them by the game's creators.

==== The Narrator ====
The Narrator has proven to be a popular fixture of The Stanley Parable, with fans of the game reacting to the character positively. Jeffrey Matulef of Eurogamer responded positively to The Narrator's role, stating: "Most games put the player in the role of a listener, sitting cross-legged on the rug while the developer spins them a yarn... The Stanley Parable, however, is more like playing improv theater with a robot comedian who was programmed to be much, much funnier than you."

Scott Donaldson, as part of the book 100 Greatest Video Game Characters, analyzed The Narrator's role in the story of The Stanley Parable, noting how The Narrator's constantly shifting role shifted from being a background element to the primary focus of the game as the player progressed. Donaldson analyzes the game's "Broom Closet Ending", likening The Narrator's response to the player in that scene as helping to emphasize The Narrator recognizing his own futility in the story and The Narrator's own status of simply being pre-recorded voice lines for the player to follow in order to progress the game's narrative. Another ending, in which The Narrator reacts to Stanley discovering a wall listing every line of dialogue uttered by The Narrator in a playthrough, was analyzed for how The Narrator attempted to reclaim control of his narrative after discovering his own lack of freedom in the story of the game. They noted that despite The Narrator himself not being a "real" person, it helped highlight the game's themes of agency and how The Narrator began to think about his own role in the video game.

The book Time and Space in Video Games: A Cognitive-Formalist Approach believed the Narrator to be the main crux of The Stanley Parable's main message, which was the relation between the player and the game. It emphasized that The Narrator's frustration, combined with his British accent and formal way of speaking even when frustrated, encouraged players to want to disobey The Narrator in order to see what would happen. Fictionality, Factuality, and Reflexivity Across Discourses and Media additionally analyzed how The Narrator was a homodiegetic narrator who posed as a heterodiegetic one, stating The Narrator's unique presence played with players' assumptions about how narrators functioned. The Narrator's speech was stated to help "establish the game's self-reflexivity" and its own self-awareness in regards to its story. Players of the game noted that The Narrator's novel-like way of describing what was going on led to greater player immersion in the game and the metafictional narrative emphasized via The Narrator. Additionally, The Narrator's type of speaking created a sense of disappointment in the player, which allowed for later dialogue from The Narrator to not come as a surprise to the player. The Narrator's unreliability was also noted for its lack of an ability to sway the player to do what he wants them to. The Narrator's role was compared to that of a god, having total control over a world of his creation, noting how the player was put into opposition against this "god" to triumph against the opposing side.

=== Ultra Deluxe ===
Reception (Ultra Deluxe)

Aggregate score
Aggregator	Score
Metacritic	NS: 87/100; PC: 90/100; PS5: 91/100; XSXS: 93/100

Review scores
Publication	Score
Destructoid	10/10
GameSpot	8/10
IGN	9/10
Nintendo Life	9/10
Nintendo World Report	9/10
PC Gamer (US)	88/100
Push Square	9/10
Pure Xbox	9/10

The 2022 expansion has also received critical acclaim from reviewers. As of April 2024, at Metacritic the game holds a 90/100 score based on 16 critic reviews.

On the day following the release of The Stanley Parable: Ultra Deluxe, Crows Crows Crows announced on Twitter that the game had sold more than 100,000 copies on Steam within the first 24 hours of being available.

Christopher Livingston of PC Gamer praised the game and its narrative, as well as the expansion of content from the original game. Using the example of a bucket, which the player can carry with them to expand their choices within the game, Livingston noted how the game was able to make the player feel emotionally attached to a "joke" stating that "That's really the genius of Ultra Deluxe: it gets you to laugh at a joke and then slowly makes you realize how much truth lies within that joke." Sam Machkovech of Ars Technicana similarly praised the game, citing the fourth wall breaking nature of much of the game's new content, as well as the humor and choices offered to the player in the game. IGN's Tom Marks responded positively to the game, praising the amount of new content and the game's humor, but criticized the perceived passivity of several of the game's new routes in comparison to the original game's, though admitted some of this reaction may be due to "the fact that I better knew what to expect nine years later".

Alex Culafi of Nintendo World Report similarly praised the game, responding positively to the added content and port-specific additions, but criticized frame rate issues present in certain ports. Jordan Ramée of GameSpot praised the game, and responded positively to the new content and how it critiqued the gaming industry as a whole. Noelle Warner of Destructoid praised the game's inherent charm, noting that despite the game's own deconstruction of its formula, it was bolstered by an inherent love for it. She praised the game's humor, new accessibility features and content, as well as the new content's critique on the gaming industry, hype, and game reviewing.

At the New York Game Awards, Ultra Deluxe won in the category "Freedom Tower Award for Best Remake".

== In popular culture ==
In May 2014, an announcer pack featuring the voice of the Narrator was released for the multiplayer online battle arena game Dota 2. During the same month, The Narrator appears as an optional announcer for Johann Sebastian Joust in the game compilation Sportsfriends.

The Stanley Parable appeared during episode 7 of the third season of House of Cards—with other games such as Monument Valley appearing throughout the season—where President Frank Underwood is being shown the game by a novelist and video game reviewer who is writing his biography, where the puzzling nature of the game's ability to contradict narrative elements was used as a metaphor for the current politics in the show's fiction.

Severance, an Apple TV+ series, took inspiration from The Stanley Parable.

== See also ==
- List of video games derived from mods
- The Beginner's Guide – a 2015 game also made by Davey Wreden, the creator of The Stanley Parable
- Dr. Langeskov, The Tiger, and The Terribly Cursed Emerald: A Whirlwind Heist – a 2015 game reminiscent of The Stanley Parable, created by William Pugh
- Every Day the Same Dream – a 2D art game released in 2009 with similar themes to The Stanley Parable
- Inscryption – a 2021 rougelike deck-building game with metafictional themes
- OneShot – a 2016 puzzle adventure game with metafictional themes
- Slay the Princess – a 2023 visual novel with a similar design and premise to The Stanley Parable
- Stranger than Fiction – a 2006 film with similar themes
- There Is No Game: Wrong Dimension – a 2020 puzzle adventure game with metafictional themes
