= Rick and Morty (franchise) =

American animated science-fiction comedy franchise

- Created by: Justin Roiland; Dan Harmon
- Original work: Rick and Morty pilot
- Owners: The Cartoon Network, Inc. (Skydance)
- Years: 2013–present

Print publications
- Comics: Rick and Morty (2015–2020); Lil' Poopy Superstar (2016); Pocket Like You Stole It (2017); Presents (2018–present); Dungeons & Dragons (2018–19); Dungeons & Dragons II: Painscape (2019–20); Go to Hell (2020); Ever After (2020–21); Worlds Apart (2021); Rick's New Hat (2021); Corporate Assets (2021-22); Infinity Hour (2022); Crisis on C-137 (2022-2023); Rick and Morty vs. Cthulhu (2022–23); The Manga (2023); Meeseeks, P.I. (2023–24); Finals Week (2024)

Films and television
- Short films: The Non-Canonical Adventures (2016–2017; 2019); Bushworld Adventures (2018); Samurai & Shogun (2020); Rick and Morty vs. Genocider (2020); Rick + Morty in the Eternal Nightmare Machine (2021); Summer Meets God (Rick Meets Evil) (2021); The Great Yokai Battle of Akihabara (2021); Samurai and Shogun Part 2 (2021)
- Animated series: Rick and Morty (2013–present); Vindicators 2: Last Stand Between Earth and Doom (2022); Rick and Morty: The Anime (2024); President Curtis (2026)

Games
- Traditional: Total Rickall Game; Mr. Meeseeks' Box o' Fun; Anatomy Park Game; Dungeons & Dragons vs. Rick and Morty; Close Rick-counters of the Rick Kind Game; Look Who’s Purging Now Game; The Morty Zone Dice Game; The Pickle Rick Game; The Ricks Must Be Crazy Multiverse Game; The Rickshank Rickdemption Game
- Video game(s): Pocket Mortys (2016); Rick and Morty: Virtual Rick-ality (2017)

Official website
- https://www.adultswim.com/videos/rick-and-morty

Rick and Morty is an American animated science fiction comedy franchise, whose eponymous duo consists of Rick Sanchez and Morty Smith; they were created by cartoonist Justin Roiland for a 2006 parody film of Back to the Future for Channel 101, a short film festival co-founded by Dan Harmon. After six years, the sketch was developed into Rick and Morty, a half-hour prime time series that was a hit for Adult Swim, receiving universal acclaim across all seasons. Alongside the original television series, its characters have been featured in a variety of media, including spin-offs, comic books, musical releases and video games. The show has earned hundreds of millions of dollars in income across their merchandising and media franchise.

The series centers on the misadventures of cynical mad scientist Rick Sanchez and his good-hearted but fretful grandson Morty Smith, who split their time between domestic life and interdimensional adventures, with the characters traveling to other planets and dimensions through portals and Rick's flying car. Different versions of the characters inhabit other dimensions throughout the show's multiverse and their personal characteristics can vary from one reality to another. The Rick and Morty franchise has received widespread critical acclaim, winning two Annie and Emmy Awards.

== Background ==
=== Creation ===
Justin Roiland conceived of the idea for Rick and Morty as an evolution of his 2006 short film parody series The Real Animated Adventures of Doc and Mharti, inspired by Back to the Future and Scud: The Disposable Assassin, the latter series of which future Rick and Morty co-creator Dan Harmon had written for.

=== Themes ===
Dan Harmon has described Rick and Morty as "a never-ending fart joke wrapped around a studied look into nihilism". The formula of the series consists of juxtapositioning two conflicting scenarios: an extremely selfish, alcoholic grandfather dragging his grandson along for interdimensional adventures, intercut with domestic family drama, while addressing the insignificance of human existence as compared to the size of the universe, with no recognizable divine presence, as described by H. P. Lovecraft's philosophy of cosmicism. Lovecraftian influence exists throughout the series, both visually and thematically. Not only does the series periodically depict images of Lovecraft’s Cthulhu, but the series’ foundation rests upon a Lovecraftian style of weird fiction, and an uncanny interpretation of Earth where once familiar parts of everyday life become questionable or uncertain. Like Lovecraft’s works, the series avoids any true connection to the sublime regardless of its otherworldly environments through frequent high stakes cosmic horror with no immediate return to the familiar world. However, unlike Lovecraft, a solution of completing a particular task can result in a return to the familiar in order to resolve an episode, or arc, allowing for a continuing narrative.

The characters of the series deal with existential dread and cosmic horror, either by asserting the utility of science over magic or by choosing a life in ignorant bliss. However, as Joachim Heijndermans of Geeks notes, none of the characters appear able to handle the absurd and chaotic nature of the universe, as Jerry gets by through denial while Rick is a "depressed, substance-addicted, suicidal mess".

Harmon describes the titular Rick Sanchez as a self-interested anarchist, who doesn't like being told what to do. He believes that the character's life on a larger scale has caused him mental illness, and opines that "the knowledge that nothing matters—while accurate—gets you nowhere". Matthew Bulger of The Humanist noted that the creators of the series were trying to communicate the message that we need to focus on human relationships and not preoccupy our minds with unanswerable questions, in order to find a sense of purpose and live a better life. Eric Armstrong of The New Republic notes that Morty represents the audience, as he is "mostly there to react to Rick's deranged schemes". The character is transformed by the truths he discovers during his interdimensional adventures with his grandfather. However, instead of sinking into depression, Morty accepts these truths that empower him to value his own life.

Occasionally, characters will acknowledge an episode's narrative or hint at the presence of a fourth wall, suggesting that they are aware of the fact that they are characters of a television series. Thereunder, Troy Patterson of The New Yorker notes that Rick and Morty "supplies an artful answer to the question of what follows postmodernism: a decadent regurgitation of all its tropes, all at once, leavened by some humanistic wistfulness." Sean Sebastian of Junkee says that the show can be both hilarious and deeply disturbing at the same time as it excels at the "intersection between big ideas, flippancy and wit."

=== Main characters ===
The main characters of the show are the members of the Smith household, which consists of parents Jerry and Beth, their children Summer and Morty, and Beth's father, Rick Sanchez, who lives with them as a guest. According to Justin Roiland, the family lives outside of Seattle, Washington.

- Richard "Rick" Sanchez, voiced by Justin Roiland,(season 1-season 6), Ian Cardoni (season 7-present) is a sociopathic, nihilistic, narcissistic, self-centered, alcoholic mad scientist who is the father of Beth Smith and the maternal grandfather of Morty and Summer. One of Rick's interdimensional counterparts, Rick Prime, serves as a major antagonist. Roiland considers his voice for Rick to be a "horrible Doc Brown manic impression".
- Mortimer "Morty" Smith Sr., voiced by Justin Roiland, (season 1-season 6), Harry Belden (season 7-present) is Rick's neurotic 14-year-old grandson, son of Jerry and Beth Smith and younger brother of Summer Smith, who is frequently dragged into Rick's misadventures. One of Morty's interdimensional counterparts, Evil Morty, serves as the main antagonist of the series. Roiland considers his initial voice for Morty to be a "horrible Marty McFly impression".
- Gerald "Jerry" Smith, voiced by Chris Parnell, is Summer's and Morty's insecure 34-year-old father, Beth's husband, and Rick's son-in-law, who strongly disapproves of Rick's influence over his family.
- Summer Smith, voiced by Spencer Grammer, is Morty's 17-year-old (18 after season 5) older sister, a more conventional and often superficial teenager, who is obsessed with improving her status among her peers. Summer is generally similar to her mother, as she is often shown to be very smart and humorous, but she has also shown elements of Jerry's approval-seeking.
- Bethany "Beth" Smith (née Sanchez), voiced by Sarah Chalke, is Rick's daughter, Summer and Morty's mother, and Jerry's wife. She is the most assertive force in her household, while also displaying traits of selfishness, humor, and intelligence. Beth is unperturbed by her father's destructive and dangerous tendencies around her son. She, from childhood, views Rick more favorably than her mother due to the parental separation. Harmon expanded upon this origin in an interview: "Kids can sometimes idolize their worst parent and blame their supportive parent for chasing off the dad with the guts to leave. ... She believes that Rick, as crazy as he is, is the better of her two parents even though she was raised by her mother and she blames her mother's unremarkability on her father's departure and will do anything to keep her father back in her life." In "The ABC's of Beth", it is revealed that Beth shares the same sociopathic tendencies as her father. Rick offers to make Beth a clone of herself to tend to her family while she can explore the multiverse. In "Star Mort Rickturn of the Jerri", it is revealed that Rick did indeed make a clone of Beth, as there is another Space Beth fighting a new and improved version of the Galactic Federation, having usurped Rick as the "Most Wanted" in the galaxy. However, Rick erased his memory so that he does not remember which Beth is the original and which is the clone, which results in both Beths not caring about the truth or about Rick. Chalke praised the "really interesting dynamic" between the characters, expressing interest in future seasons of the series depicting "all of the things she used to do [as a child], like force Rick to make her mind control hair clips so people would like her. Just seeing her behave so much like Rick at such a young age would be really fun."

== Television series ==
Four television series make up the Rick and Morty franchise: Rick and Morty, Vindicators 2, The Anime, and President Curtis. All series in total amount to 126 episodes across 12 seasons of television.

Series	Season	Episodes	Originally released			Status
Series	Season	Episodes	First released	Last released	Network	Status
Rick and Morty	1	11	December 2, 2013	April 14, 2014	Adult Swim	Released
Rick and Morty	2	10	July 26, 2015	October 4, 2015	Adult Swim	Released
Rick and Morty	3	10	April 1, 2017 (Note: The third season of Rick and Morty premiered unannounced on April 1, 2017. The remaining episodes began airing weekly on July 30, 2017.)	October 1, 2017	Adult Swim	Released
Rick and Morty	4	10	November 10, 2019	May 31, 2020	Adult Swim	Released
Rick and Morty	5	10	June 20, 2021	September 5, 2021	Adult Swim	Released
Rick and Morty	6	10	September 4, 2022	December 11, 2022	Adult Swim	Released
Rick and Morty	7	10	October 15, 2023	December 17, 2023	Adult Swim	Released
Rick and Morty	8	10	May 25, 2025	July 27, 2025	Adult Swim	Released
Rick and Morty	9	10	May 24, 2026	July 26, 2026	Adult Swim	Released
Rick and Morty	10	TBA	TBA	TBA	Adult Swim	Pre-production
Rick and Morty	11	TBA	TBA	TBA	Adult Swim	Pre-production
Rick and Morty	12	TBA	TBA	TBA	Adult Swim	Pre-production
Vindicators 2	1	10	July 23, 2022		YouTube	Concluded
Rick and Morty: The Anime	Shorts	5	March 29, 2020	November 12, 2021	Adult Swim	Concluded
Rick and Morty: The Anime	1	10	August 16, 2024	October 18, 2024	Adult Swim	Concluded
President Curtis	1	10	July 26, 2026	September 27, 2026	Adult Swim	Released
President Curtis	2	TBA	TBA	TBA	Adult Swim	In development

=== Doc and Mharti shorts on Channel 101 (2006) ===
Justin Roiland and Dan Harmon first met at the latter's Los Angeles-based non-profit monthly short film festival Channel 101, at which participants submit a short film in the format of a pilot, and a live audience decides which pilots continue as series. Roiland, then a producer on reality programming, began submitting shock value—"sick and twisted" pilots to the festival a year after its launch, in 2004, eliciting confused reactions from the audience to which Harmon took a liking, leading to the two beginning an ongoing collaboration. In 2006, following the cancellation of Roiland's House of Cosbys, a series he regarded as "intensely creatively stifling," Roiland funneled his creative energies into creating a web series for Channel 101. The result was The Real Animated Adventures of Doc and Mharti, an animated short starring parodies of Doc Brown and Marty McFly, characters from the Back to the Future film trilogy, while promoting Harmon's run on Scud: The Disposable Assassin. Harmon would later dub the shorts "a bastardization, a pornographic vandalization" of what Rick and Morty would ultimately represent, despite their positive critical reception.

Roiland, who voiced the title characters in Doc and Mharti, would later reprise his roles in Rick and Morty.

=== Rick and Morty (2013–present) ===
In 2012, Harmon was briefly fired from his NBC sitcom Community. The Adult Swim network, searching for a more prime-time, "hit" show, approached Harmon shortly afterward, who initially viewed the channel as unfit for his style, citing his unfamiliarity with animation and his process for creating television focusing more heavily on dialogue, characters, and story than popular animated series of the time. Instead, Harmon phoned Roiland to inquire if he had any ideas for an animated series, to which Roiland proposed a series focused on the Doc and Mharti characters, ultimately renamed Rick and Morty. Roiland initially wanted the show's run time to consist of one eleven-minute segment, but Adult Swim pushed for a half-hour program. Harmon felt the best way to extend the voices into a program would be to build a family around the characters, to which decision Adult Swim development executive Nick Weidenfeld suggested that Rick be made to be Morty's grandfather. Having pitched multiple television programs that did not get off the ground, Roiland was initially very unreceptive to others attempting to give notes on his pitch. Prior to developing Rick and Morty, he had created three failed animated pilots for Fox, and he had begun to feel "burned out" with developing television.

The first draft of the series' pilot was completed in six hours on the Paramount Pictures lot in Dan Harmon's unfurnished Community office. The duo had broken the story that day, sold the pilot, and then sat down to write. Roiland, while acknowledging a tendency for procrastination, encouraged Harmon to stay and write the entire first draft. "We were sitting on the floor, cross-legged with laptops and I was about to get up and go home and he said, 'Wait, if you go home, it might take us three months to write this thing. Stay here right now and we can write it in six hours.' He just had a premonition about that," recalled Harmon. Adult Swim was initially unsure of Roiland doing both voices, partially due to the undeveloped nature of the character of Morty. Harmon wrote four short premises in which Morty took a more assertive role and sent it to Mike Lazzo. Adult Swim subsequently placed a tamer TV-14 rating on the program, which initially was met with reluctance from the show's staff. The network's reason behind the rating was that it would soon begin broadcasting in prime-time, competing with major programs.

Harmon described the series as a cross between Matt Groening's two shows The Simpsons and Futurama, balancing family life with heavy science fiction. Harmon has stated that his inspiration behind much of the concept and humor for the series comes from various British television series, such as The Hitchhiker's Guide to the Galaxy and Doctor Who. He figures that the audience will only understand developments from Morty's point of view, but stated "we don't want to be the companions. We want to hang out with the Doctor, we idolize the Doctor, but we don't think like him, and that's really interesting."

Rick and Morty has received universal acclaim, holding an approval rating of 94% on review aggregator website Rotten Tomatoes for the entire series. While later seasons would focus on the wider Smith family, Rick was the lead character in most of the first two seasons. In July 2020, following the conclusion of the fourth season, it was revealed that 70 episodes were ordered by Adult Swim in 2018, leaving 60 more to air over an unspecified number of seasons. Hallmarks of the show include the opening sequence; its theme song; the Mr. Meeseeks and Mr. Poopybutthole characters, which have themselves inspired an offshoot of merchandise; its use of cultural references; sight gags; and the use of catchphrases, such as Rick's drunken "Wubba lubba dub dub".

Rick and Morty has won several awards since it debuted as a series, including a Critics' Choice Television Award, two Annie Awards, an American Cinema Editors Award, and two Primetime Emmy Awards.

"Mathlete's Feat" is the twenty-second episode and season finale of the twenty-sixth season of the animated television series The Simpsons, and the 574th episode of the series overall. It aired in the United States on Fox on May 17, 2015. The couch gag of "Mathlete's Feat" is a crossover with Rick and Morty, featuring the titular duo crashing into the Simpson family.

=== Vindicators 2: Last Stand Between Earth and Doom (2022) ===
On May 20, 2021, Adult Swim announced a short spin-off series entitled The Vindicators was in development, alongside spin-offs from other Adult Swim shows like Aqua Teen Hunger Force, Robot Chicken, and Your Pretty Face Is Going to Hell. The ten-episode series premiered on Adult Swim's YouTube channel, with each episode being between two and three minutes. The series centers on the characters Supernova, Vance Maxiumus, Alan Rails, Crocubot, Million Ants and Noop Noop previously introduced in the Season 3 episode, "Vindicators 3: The Return of Worldender", along with Diablo Verde, Lady Katana and Calypso, the former Vindicators first mentioned in the Season 3 episode and featured in the Rick and Morty comic series arc "Vindicators 1: Origin of the Vindicators". Following the series premiere on YouTube in July 2022, entitled Vindicators 2: Last Stand Between Earth and Doom, or simply Vindicators 2, showrunner Sarah Carbiener expressed interest in further seasons of the series being produced.

=== Rick and Morty: The Anime (2024) ===
On May 18, 2022, Adult Swim ordered a 10-episode anime series, Rick and Morty: The Anime, directed by Takashi Sano and from Telecom Animation, who also helmed two anime short films for the franchise. The anime series premiered on Adult Swim on midnight of August 16, 2024 and on Toonami on midnight of August 18.

=== President Curtis (2026–present) ===
On July 25, 2025, a spin-off series focusing on President Curtis was announced at San Diego Comic-Con. President Curtis premiered in July 2026.

=== Other potential series ===
Following the series premiere of Vindicators 2 in July 2022, Rick and Morty spin-off showrunner Sarah Carbiener expressed interest in a further spin-off ses potentially being produced about Dr. Wong (voiced by Susan Sarandon), tentatively entitled In Treatment with Dr. Wong, featuring "different Rick and Morty characters [doing] the five-episodes-a-week therapy session. Never cut away, it's just her and like a year ahead doing therapy."

== Short films ==
From 2017 to 2019, Adult Swim released a series of claymation short films called Rick and Morty: The Non-Canonical Adventures on YouTube. They were created by Lee Hardcastle, and parody films in the horror and science fiction genres.

On March 29, 2020, an anime short film called Samurai & Shogun on Adult Swim's Toonami programming block and were promptly uploaded to the network's YouTube channel. It was directed by Kaichi Saton and produced and animated by Studio Deen.

On July 26, 2020, a second special Rick and Morty anime short was aired, titled Rick and Morty VS. Genocider. It was written and directed by Takashi Sano, produced by Sola Entertainment, and animated by Telecom Animation Film. The 8-minute, 15-second-long short features Japanese dialogue with English subtitles.

On April 30, 2021, a pixel art-animated short film was aired, titled Rick + Morty in the Eternal Nightmare Machine. The 17-minute short film was written, directed, and animated solely by animator Paul Robertson, in the style of a 16-bit video game.

On August 2, 2021, a third anime short film titled "Summer Meets God (Rick Meets Evil)" was uploaded to YouTube and aired on Adult Swim the next day. It was also written and directed by Takashi Sano and produced and animated by Sola Entertainment and Telecom Animation Film, respectively. Like the previous short films, the 15-minute feature contains Japanese dialogue with English subtitles.

On October 10, 2021, a fourth anime short film titled "The Great Yokai Battle of Akihabara" was released on YouTube and aired on Adult Swin the following day. It was directed by Masaru Matsumoto, written by Naohiro Fukushima, animated by Yamato Works Inc and produced by Sola Entertainment. The 10 and a half minute animation has Japanese dialogue with English subtitles and continues with Yōhei Tadano and Keisuke Chiba voicing Rick and Morty respectively.

== Comic books ==
Rick and Morty is an American comic book series written by Zac Gorman (volumes 1–2), Kyle Starks (volumes 3–12), and Alex Firer (volumes 13–14) and illustrated by Marc Ellerby, based on the television series of the same name. Oni Press published the original series across 60 issues from April 1, 2015, until March 25, 2020. Using the television series' established premise of alternate timelines, the first two volumes expressly follow the Rick and Morty of a different dimension (C-132) on the "Central Finite Curve" than the protagonists of the television series so-as not to contradict its continuity, before the series switches focus over to the same Rick (C-137) and Morty of the television series following the "Head-Space" arc (#12–14) in the third volume, featuring sequel storylines to specific episodes of the series, with elements of the comic series and references to its events later being incorporated into the television series. Backup stories of the series alternate between focusing on Rick (C-137) and his Morty and various Ricks and Mortys from alternate dimensions, before the primary storyline switches focus over to yet another Rick and Morty at an unspecified point before/during the final volume of the series. In October 2022, a revival of Rick and Morty was announced for a January 2023 release date, spinning out of the limited series Rick's New Hat, from the same new creative team. The comic-book franchise will conclude with Rick and Morty Forever in May 2026.

Several spin-off limited series based on the television series and video game Pocket Mortys have also been published, with Rick and Morty Presents, an anthology series following the franchise's supporting characters in main roles, beginning publication in 2018.

== Video games ==
In 2014, Rick and Morty's Rushed Licensed Adventure, a Flash point-and-click adventure game, was released on the Adult Swim website. In December 2014, Rick and Morty: Jerry's Game was released for iOS and Android. The game consists of the player endlessly popping balloons, with characters showing up from time to time. The number of balloons popped is counted and used as currency for unlocking special balloons, backdrops and features. The game is based on a game Jerry was seen playing in an episode. The game includes micro-transactions. On August 10, 2015, a Rick and Morty-themed announcer pack was released for the competitive multiplayer video game Dota 2. The announcer pack can be purchased by players and replaces the Default announcer and Mega-Kills announcer with characters from Rick and Morty, voiced by Justin Roiland.

Both Rick and Morty appear as playable characters in MultiVersus, along with a stage based on the episode "Get Schwifty".

=== Pocket Mortys ===
Pocket Mortys is a Pokémon parody game, released on iOS and Android as a free-to-play game from Adult Swim Games, released early on January 13, 2016. Coinciding with the many-worlds interpretation, the game follows versions of Rick and Morty that belong to an alternate timeline, rather than the duo followed in the show. The game uses a style and concept similar to the Pokémon games, with catching various "wild" Mortys, battling them with a variety of Aliens, Ricks, and Jerrys. The game features voice acting from Roiland and Harmon.

=== Rick and Morty: Virtual Rick-ality ===
Rick and Morty: Virtual Rick-ality, announced on July 15, 2016, and released on April 20, 2017, for Microsoft Windows and on April 10, 2018, for PlayStation 4, is a VR game for HTC Vive VR and Oculus Rift developed by Owlchemy Labs, the developers of Job Simulator.

== Merchandise ==
=== Home releases ===
The 11-episode first season of Rick and Morty was released by Warner Home Video on DVD (2-disc set) and Blu-ray (single BD-50 disc) on October 7, 2014. Special features include commentary and animatics for every episode, deleted scenes, behind the scenes featurette and commentaries by special guests Matt Groening, Robert Kirkman, Pendleton Ward, Al Jean and others. The 10-episode second season was released on DVD (2-disc set) and Blu-ray (single BD-50 disc) on June 7, 2016. Special features include behind the scenes, commentary and animatics for every episode, deleted animatic sketches and a "Plumbus Owner's Manual" booklet. The 10-episode third season, was released on DVD (2-disc set) and Blu-ray (single BD-50 disc) on May 15, 2018. Special features include exclusive commentary and animatics for every episode, "inside the episode", the origins of Rick and Morty, and an exclusive "inside the recording booth" session. On February 12, 2019, a set containing seasons 1-3 was released on DVD and Blu-ray.

Uncensored versions of the show are also available to purchase on various digital platforms, including iTunes and Amazon, with the digital releases of each season containing bonus material. The digital release of the first season includes the 2013 Rick and Morty Comic-Con panel, the digital release of the second season includes the 2015 ATX Television Festival panel, and the digital release of the third season includes commentary on every episode, as well as seven more short videos featuring co-creators Dan Harmon and Justin Roiland.

The show streamed on Netflix in all regions internationally and while has since been removed in multiple regions, it remains available in over a dozen countries.

=== Music ===
On August 27, 2017, the song "Terryfold", recorded by the American indie pop band Chaos Chaos and featuring Justin Roiland on vocals, was released onto music streaming platforms and made available for digital download. The song was created for the third-season episode "Rest and Ricklaxation". On March 16, 2018, Adult Swim released a music video directed by Juan Meza-León in which the series' eponymous characters embark on an adventure, while the song "Oh Mama" from the American hip hop duo Run the Jewels plays in the background. The video promoted the duo's appearance in the 2018 Adult Swim Festival.

=== Board and card games ===
On June 22, 2016, Cryptozoic Entertainment released Total Rickall, a co-operative strategy card game based on the plot of the second-season episode of the same name, where players must determine which characters are real and which ones are parasites. On August 3, 2016, Cryptozoic Entertainment released Mr. Meeseeks' Box o' Fun, a game combining elements of dice games and truth or dare featuring the popular Mr. Meeseeks character from the first-season episode "Meeseeks and Destroy". On July 12, 2017, Cryptozoic Entertainment released Anatomy Park — The Game, a co-operative tile-placing strategy game based on the plot of the first-season episode of the same name, where players score points by placing park tiles into the best spots within the body. On November 19, 2019, Wizards of the Coast released Dungeons & Dragons vs. Rick and Morty, a starter box set for 5th Edition Dungeons & Dragons. It includes a Rick and Morty themed adventure (The Lost Dungeon Of Rickedness: Big Rick Energy), a rulebook, five pre-generated character sheets inspired by characters in the show, a specially designed DM screen, and a set of dice.

=== Other ===
As a promotion for the third season of Rick and Morty, on May 11, 2017, the Rickmobile, a traveling shop with exclusive merchandise, made its first stop in Atlanta for the Rick and Morty Don't Even Trip Road Trip.

Several licensed Funko Pops have been based on various characters of Rick and Morty. Hot Topic has sold many licensed Rick and Morty products such as T-shirts, Boxer Briefs, Hats, socks, Tank tops, shoes, hoodies, and Sweatshirts.
