= Rick and Morty (comics) =

American comic book series based on Rick and Morty

- Cover of Rick and Morty: Let the Rick One In.
- Created by: First run: (2015–2020): Zac Gorman (volumes 1–2); Kyle Starks (volumes 3–12); Second run: (2023): Alex Firer (volumes 13–14)
- Owners: Oni Press (via Adult Swim); IDW Publishing (Dungeons & Dragons)
- Years: April 1, 2015–May 27, 2026

Print publications
- Comics: Ongoing series: Rick and Morty (2015–2020) Rick and Morty Presents (2018–present) The Space Shake Saga (2023) The Manga (2023–present): Limited series: Lil' Poopy Superstar (2016) Pocket Like You Stole It (2017) vs. Dungeons & Dragons (2018) vs. Dungeons & Dragons II: Painscape (2019) Go to Hell (2020) Ever After (2020–2021) Worlds Apart (2021) Rick's New Hat (2021) Corporate Assets (2021–2022) Infinity Hour (2022) Crisis on C-137 (2022–2023) vs. Cthulhu (2022–2023) Heart of Rickness (2023) Meeseeks, P.I. (2023–2024) Finals Week (2024) Kingdom Balls (2024) Youth in Rickvolt (2024) RickleMania (2025) Rick and Morty vs. the Universe (2025) The Unreprintable Rick and Morty (2025) The End (2025-2026): One-shots: vs. Dungeons & Dragons: The Meeseeks Adventure (2021) Super Spring Break Special (2024) 10th Anniversary Special (2024) Rick or Treat Halloween Special (2024) Super Special Holiday Extravaganza (2024) New Year, New Rick Special (2025) Spring Break Out (2025) Forever (2026)

Rick and Morty is an American comic book series written by Zac Gorman (volumes 1–2), Kyle Starks (volumes 3–12), and Alex Firer (volumes 13–14) and illustrated by Marc Ellerby, based on the television series of the same name. Oni Press published the original series across 60 issues from April 1, 2015, until March 25, 2020. Using the television series' established premise of alternate timelines, the first two volumes expressly follow the Rick and Morty of a different dimension (C-132) on the "Central Finite Curve" than the protagonists of the television series so-as not to contradict its continuity, before the series switches focus over to the same Rick (C-137) and Morty of the television series following the "Head-Space" arc (#12–14) in the third volume, featuring sequel storylines to specific episodes of the series, with elements of the comic series and references to its events later being incorporated into the television series. Backup stories of the series alternate between focusing on Rick (C-137) and his Morty and various Ricks and Mortys from alternate dimensions, before the primary storyline switches focus over to yet another Rick and Morty at an unspecified point before/during the final volume of the series. In October 2022, a revival of Rick and Morty was announced for a January 2023 release date, spinning out of the limited series Rick's New Hat, from the same new creative team. The comic-book franchise will conclude with Rick and Morty Forever in May 2026.

Several spin-off limited series based on the television series and video game Pocket Mortys have also been published, with Rick and Morty Presents, an anthology series following the franchise's supporting characters in main roles, beginning publication in 2018.

== Rick and Morty self-titled series (2015–2020; 2023) ==
=== First series (2015–2020) ===
==== Book 1 ====
===== Volume 1 =====
| No. | Title | Release date | ISBN |
|---|---|---|---|
| 1 | The Wubba Lubba Dub Dub of Wall Street, Part One / Summer Spectacular, Part One | April 1, 2015 | 978-2-8112-2978-8 |
Rick decides to put Jerry to shame by making a ridiculous amount of money with a clueless Morty's help. The two use a device which merges dimensions to successfully pull off the scheme, but they are tracked by a "time detective" named Professor Tock; he convinces a distraught Jerry to give them up to the Time Police, and after a lengthy standoff, Rick and Morty are arrested. In the not-too-distant future, Summer has become an action hero, and saves a bank from a heist.
| 2 | The Wubba Lubba Dub Dub of Wall Street, Part Two / Summer Spectacular, Part Two | May 13, 2015 | 978-2-8112-2978-8 |
Sentenced to life in the horrifying Clackspire Labyrinth, Rick and Morty wander the seemingly endless maze, which Rick himself built and stocked with provisions, in the event he was ever imprisoned within his creation. After a long span of time, while being pursued by a monster, Rick opens a panel in a wall, leading them to a room holding a portal machine. As the portal has only enough power to transport one person, Rick shoves Morty through it, trapping himself in the maze. Meanwhile, Jerry is exiled to the basement for incriminating both Rick and Morty, but he knocks over a glass jar and releases an alien creature into the house.
| 3 | The Wubba Lubba Dub Dub of Wall Street, Part Three / Rick and Morty in: Adventure to an Alternate Universe! | June 17, 2015 | 978-2-8112-2978-8 |
The issue continues from the events of the previous installment, in which Rick condemned himself to the Clackspire Labyrinth to save Morty, and Jerry moving into the basement to escape Beth's fury, knocked over a glass containment unit belonging to Rick. Freed from the now-broken containment unit, its occupant, a Class-Two clonerbeast, infiltrates the Smith house in Rick's absence, creating confusion and threatening to destroy the family.
| 4 | The Wubba Lubba Dub Dub of Wall Street, Part Four / An Interlude With Jerry | June 22, 2015 | 978-2-8112-2978-8 |
Rick takes Morty to a planet on which he has built a plantation, taken in a large number of war refugees, and invited them to work for him. Rick asks Morty to infiltrate the workers' camp and determine whether or not they are plotting to revolt against him. When Morty does join the workers, gaining the trust of a girl named Daphna, he discovers that Rick himself started the war which drove the refugees to his planet, to the end that he might create an influx of cheap labor. The revelation leads Morty to halfheartedly join the workers' riot, but as events begin to play out, he regrets not taking his side.
| 5 | Morty and Rick in: Mort-Balls! / Introducing...Beth and the Beths! | August 19, 2015 | 978-2-8112-2978-8 |
Morty finds himself with Rick at Camp Camperson, a summer camp. However, the world in which Morty exists becomes more and more disjointed and odd as time passes, leading Morty to question his reality and bringing him into contact with an old friend. Beth C-132 is revealed to be a member of "Beth and the Beths", a punk rock band formed with interdimensional duplicates of herself, serving as its drummer. After a brawl breaks out, Beth realises she is late and returns to her dimension with Rick's portal gun, returning it to its rightful place. After Jerry asks her how "book club" went, Beth shadow-beats drums while humming.

===== Volume 2 =====
| No. | Title | Release date | ISBN |
|---|---|---|---|
| 6 | Ball Fondlers Special | September 30, 2015 | 978-1-62010-319-7 |
Deep in a faraway jungle, the freedom-loving Ball Fondlers execute an undercover operation intended to rescue an imprisoned United States senator from a martial oligarchic movement base, but the mission goes off the rails when they are discovered, calling for desperate measures. As the story comes to a climax, the film is revealed to be an incredibly long commercial for the soft drink "Clarg Lite", frustrating the Rick, Morty and Styche of C-132, watching via Interdimensional Cable.
| 7 | The Rickfinity Crisis, Part One / Dream a Little Dream of Me | October 28, 2015 | 978-1-62010-319-7 |
When a virus-monster murders a Rick from an alternate reality, its surviving Morty flees to Dimension C-132, warning its Rick and Morty of an oncoming threat. Leaving the messenger Morty behind, the C-132 Rick and Morty escape to Universe 304-X, a dimension in which no Rick has ever existed. Finding themselves cornered by a hulking assassin, they are saved from him by an adult version of Summer.
| 8 | A Very Special Blumbus / A Blumbus Carol | November 25, 2015 | 978-1-62010-319-7 |
Rick and Morty are in an unnamed dimension during December, where the residents are celebrating "Blumbus", which would seem to be their version of Christmas. Rick goes off to find a place to drink, leaving Morty looking in a shop window display. He gets scared however and runs off when a "Mr. Chimney" figure, this dimension's creepy version of Santa Claus, winks at him. He bumps into a teenage girl named Melody, who offers to bring him home to spend Blumbus with her family, mistaking him for an orphan.
| 9 | The Rickfinity Crisis, Part Two / Rick and Morty in: Into the Void | December 23, 2015 | 978-1-62010-319-7 |
| 10 | The Rickfinity Crisis, Part Three / Jerry + Rick's Day of Fun! | January 27, 2016 | 978-1-62010-319-7 |

==== Book 2 ====
===== Volume 3 =====
| No. | Title | Release date | ISBN |
|---|---|---|---|
| 11 | Ready Player Morty | February 24, 2016 | 978-1-62010-343-2 |
| 12 | Head-Space, Part One | March 12, 2016 | 978-1-62010-343-2 |
| 13 | Head-Space, Part Two | April 27, 2016 | 978-1-62010-343-2 |
| 14 | Head-Space, Part Three | May 25, 2016 | 978-1-62010-343-2 |
| 15 | Big Game (The Noble Pursuit of Fair Play) | June 29, 2016 | 978-1-62010-343-2 |

===== Volume 4 =====
| No. | Title | Release date | ISBN |
|---|---|---|---|
| 16 | The Ricky Horror Peacock Show / Don't Look a Gift-Horse in the Rick | July 27, 2016 | 978-1-62010-378-4 |
| 17 | Rick Burn, Dude / Jerry Decoy Model | August 31, 2016 | 978-1-62010-378-4 |
| 18 | New Rick City / Rick and Morty in: Pocket Mortys | September 28, 2016 | 978-1-62010-378-4 |
| 19 | Desperately Meeseeking Ruin / Rick and Morty in: Mecha Morty | October 26, 2016 | 978-1-62010-378-4 |
| 20 | Morty Bounce to the Ounce / Rick & Morty's "'Twas the Night Before Rickmas" | November 30, 2016 | 978-1-62010-378-4 |

==== Book 3 ====
===== Volume 5 =====
| No. | Title | Release date | ISBN |
|---|---|---|---|
| 21 | A Tale of Two Jerries, Part One: Jerry-Go-Round / Beth and Summer | December 28, 2016 | 978-1-62010-416-3 |
| 22 | A Tale of Two Jerries, Part Two: That Thing You Doofus / Rick and Morty in: It's a Kind of Morty Magic! | January 25, 2017 | 978-1-62010-416-3 |
| 23 | A Tale of Two Jerries, Part Three: Pacific Rick / Summer Job | February 22, 2017 | 978-1-62010-416-3 |
| 24 | Morty Shines | March 29, 2017 | 978-1-62010-416-3 |
| 25 | Tiny Rick / Rick and Jerry in: "Superior Posterior" | April 26, 2017 | 978-1-62010-416-3 |

===== Volume 6 =====
| No. | Title | Release date | ISBN |
|---|---|---|---|
| 26 | Close Rick-counters of the Drippy Kind / A VR Nice Mother's Day | May 31, 2017 | 978-1-62010-452-1 |
| 27 | Some Morty to Love / Rick and Jerry in: Look Cthulhu Talking Now! | June 28, 2017 | 978-1-62010-452-1 |
| 28 | Interdimensional Cable 3: The Threequel / Rick and Jerry in: The HurRickcane | July 26, 2017 | 978-1-62010-452-1 |
| 29 | Hitler Baby, One More Time | August 23, 2017 | 978-1-62010-452-1 |
| 30 | Neigh's Anatomy / Rick and Morty in: The Most Important Lesson | September 27, 2017 | 978-1-62010-452-1 |
"Neigh's Anatomy" is a day in the life of Beth, which is far more stressful than you would think. The animation of this comic is unique compared to the others, it looks like watercolor paint or high quality marker. Beth is irritated by Jerry's ineptitude, her baristas hostility, and dismayed by new ownership of St Equis (her place of work). Despite losing one horse on the operating table, hope is restored when she and the remaining staff help a mare give birth. Beth was able to console an upset horse owner, and inspire her new boss to keep St Equis open with one exquisite speech. But then the police arrived. content warning: blood, gun violence... "The Most Important Lesson" is a brief interlude with Rick and Morty and the importance of condoms.

==== Book 4 ====
===== Volume 7 =====
| No. | Title | Release date | ISBN |
|---|---|---|---|
| 31 | National Rickpoon's Family Vacation / The Rick Identity, Part One | October 25, 2017 | 978-2-3788-7243-4 |
| 32 | Summer's Eve | November 29, 2017 | 978-2-3788-7243-4 |
Special guest issue written by Pamela Ribon
| 33 | A Very Special issue of Rick and Morty: One Experimental Summer! / The Rick Identity, Part Two | December 27, 2017 | 978-2-3788-7243-4 |
| 34 | The Life and Death of Krombopulos Michael / The Rick Identity, Part Three | January 31, 2018 | 978-2-3788-7243-4 |
| 35 | MesozoRick Park / The Rick Identity, Part Four | February 28, 2018 | 978-2-3788-7243-4 |

===== Volume 8 =====
| No. | Title | Release date | ISBN |
|---|---|---|---|
| 36 | A Jerry Bad Day / Rick and Morty in: "Rick Salon" | March 28, 2018 | 978-1-62010-549-8 |
| 37 | Let the Rick One In, Part One / Rick and Morty in: "Extra Jerry" | April 25, 2018 | 978-1-62010-549-8 |
| 38 | Let the Rick One In, Part Two / A Bunch of Mortys in: Mortycast | May 30, 2018 | 978-1-62010-549-8 |
| 39 | Rick Air / Jerry's Right | June 27, 2018 | 978-1-62010-549-8 |
| 40 | Battle Rickale / Rick and Morty in: Morty Court | July 25, 2018 | 978-1-62010-549-8 |

==== Book 5 ====
===== Volume 9 =====
| No. | Title | Release date | ISBN |
|---|---|---|---|
| 41 | Rick Revenge Squad, Part One / Rick and Morty's Adventures in the Public Domain, Part One | August 29, 2018 | 978-1-62010-641-9 |
| 42 | Rick Revenge Squad, Part Two / Rick and Morty's Adventures in the Public Domain, Part Two | September 26, 2018 | 978-1-62010-641-9 |
| 43 | Dick and Farty / Rick and Morty's Adventures in the Public Domain, Part Three | October 31, 2018 | 978-1-62010-641-9 |
| 44 | Origin of the Vindicators / Rick and Morty's Adventures in the Public Domain, Part Four | November 28, 2018 | 978-1-62010-641-9 |
| 45 | Look Who's Cronenberging Now / Rick and Morty's Adventures in the Public Domain, Part Five | December 19, 2018 | 978-1-62010-641-9 |

===== Volume 10 =====
| No. | Title | Release date | ISBN |
|---|---|---|---|
| 46 | Michael ChRickton's RickWorld / Big Penpin' | January 30, 2019 | 978-1-62010-685-3 |
| 47 | Interdimensional Cable Trouble / U-tō, Brute? | February 27, 2019 | 978-1-62010-685-3 |
| 48 | Hit Me, Space Baby, One More Time / Teenage Wasteland | March 27, 2019 | 978-1-62010-685-3 |
| 49 | Ricktroactive / Don't Tell Rick the Jerrysitter's Dead | April 24, 2019 | 978-1-62010-685-3 |
| 50 | Morty's Mind Blowers | May 29, 2019 | 978-1-62010-685-3 |

==== Book 6 ====
===== Volume 11 =====
| No. | Title | Release date | ISBN |
|---|---|---|---|
| 51 | Rickstaken Identity / Death Becomes Him | June 26, 2019 | 978-1-62010-734-8 |
| 52 | The Mortian / Introducing: Glootie! | July 31, 2019 | 978-1-62010-734-8 |
| 53 | Lonely Jerry and the Multi-Dimensional Sales Opportunity, Part One / Rick and Morty in: Feel Bad Inc. | August 28, 2019 | 978-1-62010-734-8 |
| 54 | Lonely Jerry and the Multi-Dimensional Sales Opportunity, Part Two / Rick and Morty in: What if Rick was One of Us? | September 25, 2019 | 978-1-62010-734-8 |
| 55 | Honey, I Ricked the Kids / Rick in: Last Things | October 30, 2019 | 978-1-62010-734-8 |

===== Volume 12 =====
| No. | Title | Release date | ISBN |
|---|---|---|---|
| 56 | The Rickoning, Part One / Bitty Crittys | November 27, 2019 | 978-1-62010-873-4 |
| 57 | The Rickoning, Part Two / Blubber | December 18, 2019 | 978-1-62010-873-4 |
| 58 | The Rickoning, Part Three / Baby Don't Hurt Me | January 29, 2020 | 978-1-62010-873-4 |
| 59 | The Rickoning, Part Four / Likes and Follows | February 26, 2020 | 978-1-62010-873-4 |
| 60 | The Rickoning, Part Five / Attack the Virus | March 25, 2020 | 978-1-62010-873-4 |

=== Second series (2023) ===
==== Volume 1 ====
| No. | Title | Release date | ISBN |
|---|---|---|---|
| 1 | The Space Shake Saga Part One, Part One | January 25, 2023 | 978-1-63715-216-4 |
| 2 | The Space Shake Saga Part One, Part Two | February 22, 2023 | 978-1-63715-216-4 |
| 3 | The Space Shake Saga Part One, Part Three | March 29, 2023 | 978-1-63715-216-4 |
| 4 | The Space Shake Saga Part One, Part Four | April 19, 2023 | 978-1-63715-216-4 |
| 5 | The Space Shake Saga Part One, Part Five | May 24, 2023 | 978-1-63715-216-4 |
| 6 | The Space Shake Saga Part One, Part Six | June 25, 2023 | 978-1-63715-464-9 |

==== Volume 2 ====
| No. | Title | Release date | ISBN |
|---|---|---|---|
| 7 | The Space Shake Saga Part Two, Part One | July 26, 2023 | 978-1-63715-464-9 |
| 8 | The Space Shake Saga Part Two, Part Two | August 29, 2023 | 978-1-63715-464-9 |
| 9 | The Space Shake Saga Part Two, Part Three | September 27, 2023 | 978-1-63715-464-9 |
| 10 | The Space Shake Saga Part Two, Part Four | October 25, 2023 | 978-1-63715-464-9 |
| 11 | The Space Shake Saga Part Two, Part Five | November 22, 2023 | 978-1-63715-464-9 |
| 12 | The Space Shake Saga Part Two, Part Six | December 27, 2023 | 978-1-63715-464-9 |

== Rick and Morty Presents (2018–2024) ==
=== Volume 1 ===
| No. | Title | Release date | ISBN |
|---|---|---|---|
| 1 | The Vindicators | March 7, 2018 | 978-1-62010-552-8 |
| 2 | Krombopulos Michael | June 20, 2018 | 978-1-62010-552-8 |
| 3 | Sleepy Gary | September 19, 2018 | 978-1-62010-552-8 |
| 4 | Pickle Rick | November 21, 2018 | 978-1-62010-552-8 |

=== Volume 2 ===
| No. | Title | Release date | ISBN |
|---|---|---|---|
| 5 | Jerry | March 13, 2019 | 978-1-62010-693-8 |
| 6 | Mr. Meeseeks | June 12, 2019 | 978-1-62010-693-8 |
| 7 | The Flesh Curtains | September 4, 2019 | 978-1-62010-693-8 |
| 8 | Unity | November 6, 2019 | 978-1-62010-693-8 |

=== Volume 3 ===
| No. | Title | Release date | ISBN |
|---|---|---|---|
| 9 | The Council of Ricks | June 24, 2020 | 978-1-62010-883-3 |
| 10 | Birdperson | August 5, 2020 | 978-1-62010-883-3 |
| 11 | Jaguar | November 25, 2020 | 978-1-62010-883-3 |
| 12 | Death Stalkers | January 21, 2021 | 978-1-62010-883-3 |

=== Uncollected issue ===
For unknown reasons, this issue was not collected in a trade volume.

| No. | Title | Release date | ISBN |
|---|---|---|---|
| 13 | Jerryboree! | March 3, 2021 | — |

=== Volume 4 ===
| No. | Title | Release date | ISBN |
|---|---|---|---|
| 14 | The Hotel Immortal | July 21, 2021 | 978-1-63715-043-6 |
| 15 | Mr. Nimbus | September 22, 2021 | 978-1-63715-043-6 |
| 16 | Snuffles Goes To War | October 6, 2021 | 978-1-63715-043-6 |
| 17 | HeRicktics of Rick | January 26, 2022 | 978-1-63715-043-6 |

=== Volume 5 ===
| No. | Title | Release date | ISBN |
|---|---|---|---|
| 18 | Morty's Run | March 2, 2022 | 978-1-63715-225-6 |
| 19 | Big Dumb Summer Vacation | July 20, 2022 | 978-1-63715-225-6 |
| 20 | No. 100 | October 26, 2022 | 978-1-63715-225-6 |
| 21 | Time Zoo | March 1, 2023 | 978-1-63715-225-6 |

=== Volume 6 ===
| No. | Title | Release date | ISBN |
|---|---|---|---|
| 23 | The Science of Summer | August 27, 2023 | 978-1-63715-457-1 |
| 24 | Fricky Friday | October 11, 2023 | 978-1-63715-457-1 |
| 25 | Rick in a Box | December 13, 2023 | 978-1-63715-457-1 |

=== Maximum Trio ===
These specials, while labeled as Rick and Morty Presents, form a miniseries that is collected separately from the other Rick and Morty Presents issues.

| No. | Title | Release date | ISBN |
|---|---|---|---|
| 22 | Maximum Overture | May 27, 2023 | 978-1-63715-621-6 |
| 26 | Maximum Crescendo | January 31, 2024 | 978-1-63715-621-6 |
| 27 | Maximum Coda | December 4, 2024 | 978-1-63715-621-6 |

=== Unreleased issue ===
This issue was solicited, but for unknown reasons, was never released.

| No. | Title | Release date | ISBN |
|---|---|---|---|
| N/A | Beth H.M.D. | N/A (Originally set for November 9, 2022) | — |

== Rick and Morty: The Manga (2023–2026) ==
| No. | Title | Release date | ISBN |
|---|---|---|---|
| 1 | Get in the Robot, Morty! | October 31, 2023 | 978-1-63715-241-6 |
| 2 | After-School Science Club | February 24, 2026 | 978-1-63715-771-8 |

== Limited series (2016–2026) ==
- Rick and Morty in… Lil' Poopy Superstar #1–5 (2016)
- Rick and Morty: Pocket Like You Stole It #1–5 (2017)
- Rick and Morty vs. Dungeons & Dragons (2018–present)
  On August 29, 2018, a four-issue crossover comic with the fantasy tabletop role-playing game Dungeons & Dragons was released. The series, titled Rick and Morty vs. Dungeons & Dragons, is co-written by Jim Zub and Patrick Rothfuss, and drawn by Troy Little. A sequel mini-series, titled Rick and Morty vs. Dungeons & Dragons Chapter II: Painscape was published from September to December 2019. It was written by Jim Zub and Sarah Stern with art by Troy Little.
  The Rick and Morty vs. Dungeons & Dragons Deluxe Edition, by Rothfuss, Zub, and Little, was nominated for the 2022 "Best Graphic Album—Reprint" Eisner Award. It included an additional one-shot, titled Rick and Morty vs. Dungeons & Dragons: The Meeseeks Adventure, which was later re-released as a standalone comic issue.
- Rick and Morty: Go to Hell #1–5 (2020)
- Rick and Morty: Ever After #1–4 (2020–2021)
- Rick and Morty in… Worlds Apart #1–4 (2021)
- Rick and Morty: Rick's New Hat #1–5 (2021)
- Rick and Morty: Corporate Assets #1–4 (2021–2022)
- Rick and Morty in... Infinity Hours #1–4 (2022)
- Rick and Morty in… Crisis on C-137 #1–4 (2022–2023)
- Rick and Morty vs. Cthulhu #1–4 (2022–2023)
- Rick and Morty in… Heart of Rickness #1–4 (2023)
- Rick and Morty in… Meeseeks, P.I. #1–4 (2023–2024)
- Rick and Morty in… Finals Week #1–5 (2024)
- Rick and Morty in… Kingdom Balls #1–4 (2024)
- Rick and Morty in… Youth in Rickvolt #1–4 (2024)
- Rick and Morty: RickleMania #1–4 (2025)
- Rick and Morty vs. the Universe #1–4 (2025) + Summer of Love (2025), Beth 'Til Death (2025), and Last Mort Standing (2025)
  Oni Press considered Rick and Morty vs. the Universe to be an "event series." The event had a total of seven issues, with four being the main series and three being tie-ins.
- The Unreprintable Rick and Morty #1–2 (2025)
  The Unreprintable Rick and Morty #1–2 were exclusive to the Rick and Morty 10th Anniversary Deluxe Omnibus Library Kickstarter. #1 was available as a standalone reward or as part of other reward tiers, and #2 was only available with the two highest tiers of the campaign or as a $200 add-on. Only 500 copies of #2 were made available.
- Rick and Morty: The End #1-6 (2025-2026)

== One-shots (2021–2026) ==
These are specials which are not part of any ongoing series or limited series.

Rick and Morty vs. Dungeons & Dragons: The Meeseeks Adventure was initially a bonus issue included in the original deluxe hardcover collection of the two Rick and Morty vs. Dungeons & Dragons miniseries. The collection was released on August 24, 2021, while the one-shot was later released as a standalone issue on February 8, 2022. The ISBN associated with it below is for the collection.

The Super Spring Break Special, 10th Anniversary Special, and Rick or Treat Halloween Special are collected in Rick and Morty Yearbook: Vol. 1, which was released on September 16, 2025. The ISBN associated with them below is for that collection.

Rick and Morty Forever will be included in the same hardcover collection as the Rick and Morty: The End miniseries. That collection will be released on November 3, 2026, and the ISBN associated with Rick and Morty Forever below is for that collection.

| No. | Title | Release date | ISBN |
|---|---|---|---|
| N/A | Rick and Morty vs. Dungeons & Dragons: The Meeseeks Adventure | August 24, 2021 | 978-1-62010-875-8 |
| N/A | Super Spring Break Special | March 13, 2024 | 978-1-63715-850-0 |
| N/A | 10th Anniversary Special | July 10, 2024 | 978-1-63715-850-0 |
| N/A | Rick or Treat Halloween Special | September 25, 2024 | 978-1-63715-850-0 |
| N/A | Super Special Holiday Extravaganza | November 27, 2024 | — |
| N/A | New Year, New Rick Special | January 1, 2025 | — |
| N/A | Spring Break Out | March 5, 2025 | — |
| N/A | Rick and Morty Forever | May 27, 2026 | 979-8-89488-343-4 |
