= Chiaroscuro (comics) =

Chiaroscuro, in comics, may refer to:

- Chiaroscuro (2000 AD), a 2000 AD horror comic series.
- Chiaroscuro: The Private Lives of Leonardo da Vinci, a 1995-1996/2005 Vertigo comic book.
- Chiaroscuro (IDW Publishing), a 2000-2005/2007 series by Canadian artist Troy Little.

== See also ==
- Chiaroscuro (disambiguation)
