= James Asmus =

American comedian and writer

James Asmus is a New York Times Bestselling author and playwright, known for writing comic books such as Quantum and Woody, Thief of Thieves, Gambit, and Rick and Morty. Additionally, he has written several official nonfiction licensed books for Call of Duty, Wolverine, Hazbin Hotel, and several others.

== Career ==
Asmus initially emerged writing plays and performing comedy in Chicago, IL with theaters like The Annoyance and the sketch group Hey You Millionaires, as well as in the founding ensemble of The New Colony theater company. The plays he has written include Love Is Dead (The Annoyance), Hearts Full of Blood (the New Colony) and Amelia Earhart Jungle Princes (The New Colony). Both Love is Dead and Hearts Full of Blood received remounts in the New York Fringe Fest, winning awards for Outstanding Music & Lyrics and Outstanding Achievement in Playwrighting respectively.

Asmus is most prolific as a comic book writer, contributing to titles such as Gambit for Marvel Comics, Rick and Morty for Oni Press, Survival Street for Dark Horse Comics, and Quantum & Woody for Valiant Entertainment. In the 2020s, he began writing several officially licensed non-fiction books for Insight Editions publishing, including cookbooks, guided journals, and more for properties like Rick and Morty, Supernatural, Winne the Pooh, and others. His book on the art and history of Call of Duty Zombies became a New York Times Bestseller on release in August, 2026.

== Awards and nominations ==
- 2008 Fringe NYC Outstanding Music & Lyrics - Love Is Dead: a NecRomantic Musical Comedy
- 2008 After Dark Awards' Outstanding Original Score - Love Is Dead: a NecRomantic Musical Comedy
- 2009 Chicago Readers' Choice Best Emerging Playwright
- 2010 Fringe NYC Overall Excellence in Playwrighting - Hearts Full of Blood
- 2014 Stan Lee Excelsior Award - Silver Award, Readers' Favorite Graphic Novel - Quantum & Woody vol. 1 - World's Worst
- 2014 Harvey Awards, 3 Nominations - Best Writer, Most Promising New Talent, and Special Award for Humor in Comics - Quantum & Woody
- 2015 Harvey Awards, 2 Nominations - Special Award for Humor in Comics - Quantum & Woody and The Delinquents
- 2017 Eisner Awards, Winner - Best Anthology - Love Is Love (contributor, short story with artist Ming Doyle)
- 2026 Eisner Awards, 1 Nomination - Best Anthology - Stardust: the Super Wizard Anthology (contributor, co-writing the story 'Rainbow Rampage' with his children at ages 9 and 5, with artist Tony Gregori)

== Bibliography ==
=== Marvel Comics ===
- X-Men
  - X-Men: Manifest Destiny #1, 4 (#1 Boom Boom story; #3 Nightcrawler story, 2008)
  - X-Men: Manifest Destiny - Nightcrawler #1 (with pencils by Jorge Molina and Adrian Syaf, 2008)
  - Dark X-Men: The Beginning #1 (Mimic story, pencils by Jesse Delperdang, 2009)
  - Nation X #1 (Nightcrawler & Wolverine story, art by Mike Allred, 2009)
  - X-Men vs. Vampires #1 (Husk story, art by Tom Raney, 2010)
  - Wolverine #900 (first story only, with co-writer C. B. Cebulski pencils by David Finch (comics), 2010)
  - Deadpool Team-Up #890 (pencils by Micah Gunnell, 2010)
  - X-Men: Serve and Protect #1, 4 (#1 Emma Frost story; #4 Psylocke story, 2010-2011)
  - Uncanny X-Men Annual #3 (pencils by Nicholas Bradshaw, 2011)
  - Deadpool Family #1 (Dogpool story, pencils by Darnell Johnson, 2011)
  - Astonishing X-Men #43 (pencils by David Yardin and Gabriel Hernandez Walta, 2011)
  - Generation Hope #13-17 (pencils on #13-14 by Ibraim Roberson, #15 by Tim Green III, #16-17 by Takeshi Miyazawa, 2011-2012)
  - Gambit vol. 5 #1-17 (pencils by Clay Mann, 2012-2013)
- Other Marvel
  - Runaways Vol. 3 #10 (with co-writer Christopher Yost and art by Sara Pichelli & Emma Rios, Marvel Comics, 2009)
  - Steve Rogers: Super Soldier Annual #1 (pencils by Ibraim Roberson, 2011)
  - Namor: The First Mutant Annual #1 (pencils by Max Fiumara, 2011)
  - Captain America & Bucky #625-628 (with co-plotter Ed Brubaker and art by Francesco Francavilla, 2011-2012)
  - A+X #3 (Hawkeye + Gambit story, with pencils by Billy Tan, 2012)
  - Superior Foes of Spider-Man #10, 2014
  - All-New Inhumans #1-12 (pencils by Stefano Caselli, 2015-2016)
  - Amazing Spider-Man Annual and #25 (2016-2017)
  - Vault of Spiders #1 (Savage Spider-Man story, 2018)

=== Image Comics ===
- Thief of Thieves #8-13 (with co-writer Robert Kirkman and art by Shawn Martinbrough, Image Comics/Skybound, 2012)
- CBLDF Liberty Annual #5, story "Last Rights" with art by Takeshi Miyazawa, Image Comics, 2012)
- The End Times Of Bram & Ben #1-4, (with co-writer / co-creator Jim Festante and art by Rem Broo, Image Comics, 2013)
- Evolution #1-18, (with co-writers Joseph Keatinge and Christopher Sebela and art by Joe Infurnari, Image Comics, 2017-2018)
- Creepshow Holiday Special #1, art by Letizia Cadonici, Image Comics/Skybound, 2023)

=== Valiant Comics ===
- Quantum and Woody #1-12, (with art by Tom Fowler, 2013-2014)
- Quantum and Woody: Goat #0 (with art by Tom Fowler, 2014)
- The Delinquents #1-4, (with co-writer Fred Van Lente and art by Kano (comics), 2014)
- Valiant-Sized Quantum and Woody #1, (with co-writer Tim Siedell and art by Pere Pérez, 2014)
- Quantum and Woody Must Die! #1-4, (with art by Steve Lieber, 2015)
- Unity #23-25, 2015

=== DC Comics ===
- DC Holiday Special 2016 (Titans story, with art by Reilly Brown)
- The Terrifics Annual (Tom Strong story, with art by Jose Luis, 2018)

=== BOOM! Studios ===
- Kong of Skull Island #1-12, (with art by Carlos Magno, 2016-2017)
- Adventure Time Comics #20, ("Epic Yard Sale" story, art by Christina Rose Chua, 2018)

=== IDW Publishing ===
- My Little Pony: Friendship is Magic #51-53, (with art by Tony Fleecs, 2017), Holiday Special 2017 (art by Brenda Hickey), Holiday Special 2019 (art by Andy Price and Trish Forstner)
- Transformers: Bumblebee - Win If You Dare graphic novel (with art by Marcelo Ferriera, 2018)
- Transformers / My Little Pony - Friendship In Disguise #1-4, (with art by Tony Fleecs, 2020)
- Transformers / My Little Pony - The Magic of Cybertron #1-4, (with art by Jack Lawrence, 2021)
- Voyage to the Stars #1-4, (with art by Connie Daidone, 2020-2021)

=== ONI Press ===
- Rick and Morty Presents - Mr. Meeseeks (with co-writer Jim Festante, art by CJ Cannon, 2019)
- Aggretsuko: Meet Her Friends #3 (with art by Megan Huang, 2021)
- Rick and Morty: Corporate Assets (with art by Jarrett Williams, 2022)
- Rick and Morty: Super Spring Break Special (with co-writer Jim Festante, art by Dean Rankine, Tony Gregori, Angela Trizzino, and Mark Ellerby, 2024)
- Rick and Morty: Contested Convention (with co-writer Jim Festante, art by Suzi Blake, 2024)
- Rick and Morty: Spring Break Out (with co-writer Jim Festante, art by Dean Rankine, 2025

=== Dark Horse Comics ===
- Survival Street (co-written / co-created with Jim Festante, with art by Abylay Kussainov, 2022)
- Headless Horseman Halloween Annual 2024 - 'Spice of Life (and Death)' (art by Chris Panda, 2024)
- Survival Street: The Radical Left (co-written / co-created with Jim Festante, with art by Abylay Kussainov, 2024)

=== Opus Comics ===
- Bill & Ted Roll the Dice #1-4, (art by Wayne Nichols, 2022)

=== Bad Egg ===
- ALTRVERSE #0, (Jackie-Boy Man story with art by Connie Diadone and Austin Baechle, 2023)
- The Somewhat Incredible Jackie-Boy Man #1-4, (with art by Megan Huang, 2024-2025)

=== Insight Editions ===
- The Official Rick and Morty Cookbook (with August Craig, 2022)
- Supernatural: The Official Cocktail Book (with Adam Carbonell, 2023)
- Marvel: Cooking with Wolverine (with Cassandra Reeder, 2025)
- The Wisdom of Pooh: A Disney Winnie the Pooh Gratitude Journal (2026)
- Disney: Winnie the Pooh: The Hundred-Acre Wood Cookbook (with Liz Tarpy and Vivian Jao, 2026)
- Call of Duty Black Ops Zombies: The Art of Treyarch (2026) - New York Times Bestseller
- Hazbin Hotel: Redemption & Rehabilitation: A Sinner's Guided Journal (2027)

Preceded by Daniel Way & Christos Gage	Astonishing X-Men writer 2011	Succeeded by Greg Pak
