= Chiaroscuro (disambiguation) =

Chiaroscuro, meaning "light-dark" in Italian, is the use of contrast between light and dark in art.

Chiaroscuro may also refer to:

== Comics ==
- Chiaroscuro (comics), various comics, including:
  - Chiaroscuro (2000 AD), a 2000 AD horror comic series
  - Chiaroscuro: The Private Lives of Leonardo da Vinci, a 1995–1996/2005 Vertigo comic book
  - Chiaroscuro (IDW Publishing), a 2000–2005/2007 graphic novel by Canadian artist Troy Little

== Music ==
- Chiaroscuro (music), classical Italian vocal technique
- Chiaroscuro (Pitty album), 2009
- Chiaroscuro (Bass Communion album), 2009
- Chiaroscuro (Ralph Towner album), 2009
- Chiaroscuro (I Break Horses album), 2014
- Chiaroscuro (Ocean Alley album), 2018
- Chiaroscuro Records, a jazz recording label based in Wilkes Barre, PA
- Chiaroscuro (Kancheli), a composition for string quartet by Giya Kancheli

== Other uses ==
- Chiaroscuro, 1912 novel by Italian writer Grazia Deledda
- Chiaroscuro, character in Kate DiCamillo's The Tale of Despereaux

== See also ==
- Churrascaria, a type of restaurant
