= Hey You Millionaires =

- Starring: James Asmus, John Bohan, and Jim Fath
- Country of origin: United States

Original release
- Release: 2004 – 2011

Hey You Millionaires was a Chicago based sketch comedy trio composed of James Asmus, John Bohan, and Jim Fath. Though all three members are originally from Cleveland, Ohio, the group formed in Chicago in 2004. They've appeared on the cover of Fortune Magazine, CNN.com, were twice voted "Best Sketch Group" in the "Best of Chicago" Chicago Reader Poll (2008 and 2009). As of 2011, the group is on indefinite hiatus.

== History ==
James Asmus, John Bohan, and Jim Fath met as castmates of Cabaret Dada in Cleveland in 2003. In 2004, all having moved to Chicago, they formed the group "The Leading Brand". The group's first effort, "The Unbearable Lightness of Death", was a sketch show molded into a narrative following the story of a terminally ill man named Charlie Peeler and those seemingly oblivious characters around him. It was eventually performed at the Apollo Theater in Chicago in the spring of 2005 and then again in the same space that fall.

After a brief hiatus the group resurfaced under the new name "Hey You Millionaires" (HYM). The name was taken from the first sketch of the pilot episode of late 1980s-early 1990s Canadian sketch comedy show The Kids in the Hall.

HYM's first performance was at the Playground Theater in the winter of 2007 as part of their Graffiti sketch comedy showcase.

In 2007, the group gained notoriety when two self-produced videos were featured on Myspace, Funny or Die, and YouTube, along with a host of other online media outlets. Notable was "Crazy Hank". and "Catching the Gay"

In 2008, they performed at the Chicago Sketchfest to rave reviews and then secured a run at the Annoyance Theatre.

In 2009, they were featured in a Fortune Magazine and on CNN.com article about how to find a job. The group was invited to appear at the Just for Laughs comedy festival in Chicago. Appearing at Bob Odenkirk's Best of Sketchfest.

In 2010, the group was again, invited to appear at the Just for Laughs comedy festival in Chicago. They also toured various festivals and colleges. Their comedy short "Catching the Gay" was selected to appear in the Copenhagen Gay and Lesbian Film Festival.

As of 2011, the group has been on indefinite hiatus.

== Appearances and venues ==
=== 2005 ===
- Cleveland Black Box Theatre at Cabaret Dada, Cleveland Ohio
- Apollo Studio Theatre at the Apollo Theater Chicago IL

=== 2007 ===
- Lake Shore Theatre Chicago IL (As part of the Variety show Impress these Apes)
- The Cleveland House of Blues, Cleveland Ohio (Appeared with Last Call Cleveland)
- The Playground Theatre Chicago, IL (As part of Graffiti Sketch Comedy Showcase)
- The Playground Theatre Chicago, IL (In place of Don't Spit the water)

=== 2008 ===
- Chicago Sketch Fest 2008
- Annoyance Theatre Chicago, IL
- SketchFest NYC
- DC Comedy Fest
- SketchFest Seattle

=== 2009 ===
- Chicago Sketch Fest 2009
- Just For Laughs Comedy Festival Chicago
- Power House Pub, Cleveland, OH
- Curious Comedy Theater, Portland, OR
- Everett College, Everette, WA
- SketchFest Seattle, Seattle, WA

=== 2010 ===
- Chicago Sketch Fest, Chicago, IL
- The Improv, Hollywood, CA
- I.O. West, Hollywood, CA
- Just For Laughs Comedy Festival Chicago, IL
- Breen Center for the Performing Arts, Cleveland, OH
- Power House Pub, Cleveland, OH
- I.O. Chicago, IL
- Annoyance Theatre Chicago, IL
- Sketchfest Seattle, Seattle WA
- Curious Comedy Theater, Portland, OR
- Everett College, Everette, WA
- Copenhagen Gay and Lesbian Film Festival "Catching the Gay"

=== Directors ===
- Sarah Haskins 2007–10
- Evan Makela 2006
