= Anil Menon (writer) =

Indian writer and computer scientist

- Born: Kerala, India
- Occupation: Writer
- Writing career
- Period: 2000s–present
- Genres: Speculative fiction, science fiction, children's literature
- Notable works: Into the Night, Love In A Hot Climate, The Poincaré Sutra, The Beast With Nine Billion Feet, "The Coincidence Plot"
- Website: anilmenon.com

Anil Menon is an Indian computer scientist and writer of speculative fiction. He has authored research papers and edited books on evolutionary algorithms. His research, in collaboration with Kishan Mehrotra, Chilukuri Mohan, and Sanjay Ranka, addresses the mathematical foundations of replicator systems, majorization, and reconstruction of probabilistic databases. His short stories and reviews have appeared in the anthology series Exotic Gothic, Strange Horizons, Interzone, Lady Churchill's Rosebud Wristlet, Chiaroscuro, Sybil's Garage, Apex Digest, and others.

In 2009, Zubaan Books, India's leading feminist press, published his debut young adult novel The Beast With Nine Billion Feet. It was shortlisted for the 2010 Vodafone Crossword Book Award and the 2010 Parallax Prize. In 2009, in conjunction with Vandana Singh and Suchitra Mathur, he helped organize India's first in-residence, three-week speculative fiction workshop at IIT-Kanpur. He co-edited the anthology Breaking the Bow.

He is the author of the short story collection The Inconceivable Idea Of The Sun: Stories Menon’s novel, Half of What I Say was shortlisted for the 2016 The Hindu Literary Prize. The Coincidence Plot (2013) is his latest novel.

Along with Pervin Saket and Akshat Nigam, Menon co-founded the Kolam Writers' Workshop (previously called the Dum Pukht Writers’ Workshop). This annual two-week residential workshop, currently in its fifth iteration, is held at the Adishakti Theatre Complex in the former French colony Puducherry (Pondicherry) in Tamil Nadu.

He is the editor-in-chief of The Bombay Literary Magazine.

== Works ==
=== Short fiction ===
- "Love In A Hot Climate" in Tel: Stories (ed. Jay Lake), Wheatland Press, 2005. ISBN 0-9755903-3-2.
- "Archipelago" in Strange Horizons Magazine, April 2005. Shortlisted: 2006 Carl Brandon Society Parallax Award.
- "Eustace Albert" in Time For Bedlam (ed. Roger Arbuckle), Saltboy Publishers, 2005. ISBN 1-4116-5438-2.
- "Standard Deviation" in Chiaroscuro Magazine, March 2005. Reprinted in Kalkion Magazine, July 2010. Honorable Mention: Year's Best Fantasy & Horror (ed. Ellen Datlow), 2006.
- "Dialetheia" in New Genre Magazine, Issue No. 5, Spring 2007.
- "Invisible Hand" in Lady Churchill's Rosebud Wristlet, No. 20, June 2007.
- "A Sky Full Of Constants" in Albedo One, Issue 33, 2007.
- "Vermillion" in Internova Magazine, Issue 10, January 2007.
- "Harris On The Pig: Practical Hints For The Pig-Farmer" in From The Trenches (ed. J. P. Haines & S. Henderson), Carnifax Press, 2006. ISBN 0-9789583-2-2. Reprinted in Apex Magazine, December 2008.
- "Into The Night" in Interzone, January 2008. Reprinted in The Apex Book Of World SF (ed. Lavie Tidhar), 2008. Reprinted Apex Digest, November 2008. Reprinted Galaxies, January 2010.
- "The Scorching Glass" in Return of the Raven (ed. Maria Grazia Cavicchiolli), 2009.
- "The Poincaré Sutra" in Sybil's Garage, Issue 7, 2011. Nominated for the 2010 Carl Brandon Society Parallax Award and the Carl Brandon Society Kindred Award.
- "The Uncertain Hour" in The Tangled Bank: Love, Wonder, and Evolution (ed. Chris Lynch), February 2011.
- "Haveli" in Exotic Gothic 5, Vol. II (ed. Danel Olson), PS Publishing, 2012.

=== Children's fiction ===
- "Ice" in Shockwave & Other Cyber Stories (ed. Vatsala Kaul), Penguin Books, India, 2007. ISBN 0-14-333054-3.
- "Before and After" in Dignity Dialogue, August 2010.
- "Shrieknath" in Whispers in the Classroom, Voices on the Field (ed. Richa Jha), July 2011.
- "A Different Ballgame" in Sports Stories (ed. Himanjali Sankar), Scholastic India, 2011.
- "No More", Hoot Magazine, July 2011.

=== Novels ===
- The Beast with Nine Billion Feet, Zubaan Publishers (India), 2009, ISBN 978-81-89884-39-0. Shortlisted for the 2010 Vodafone-Crossword Award.
- Half of What I Say, Bloomsbury (2016), ISBN 9789386141187. Shortlisted for the 2016 Hindu Literary Prize
- The Coincidence Plot, Simon & Schuster (2023), ISBN 9789392099670.

=== Anthologies ===
- Breaking the Bow: Speculative Fiction Inspired by the Ramayana (eds. Anil Menon & Vandana Singh), Zubaan Books, December 2011.
- The Inconceivable Idea Of The Sun: Stories (2022), Hachette India, ISBN 9391028608.

== Articles ==
- "Hunting a Snark: On the Trail of Regional Indian SF". Translated by: Juan Madrigal, Literatura Prospectiva5 May 2010.
- "World Building in a Hot Climate", World SF Blog Editorial, 19 May 2010
- "The Raw and the Cooked", World SF Blog Editorial, 25 November 2009.

== Interviews ==
- SF-Signal Interview 2 Nov. 2009.
- Hindustan Times, Interview by Sumeet Kaul, 6 Dec. 2009.
- The Hindu, Kochi Metroplus, Interview by Prema Manmadhan, 15 January 2010.
- Kalkion Online Interview by Swapnil Bhartiya, 15 February 2010.
- Sanskrit Literature Blog, Interview by Venetia Ansell, 4 March 2010.
- OPEN Magazine: Changing Epic Traditions, Interview by Sudha G. Tilak, 2 August 2010.
- NRK (Norwegian Broadcasting Corporation), Interview by Ana Leticia Sigvartsen, 16 June 2011.
