= Sam Maggs =

Canadian-American writer

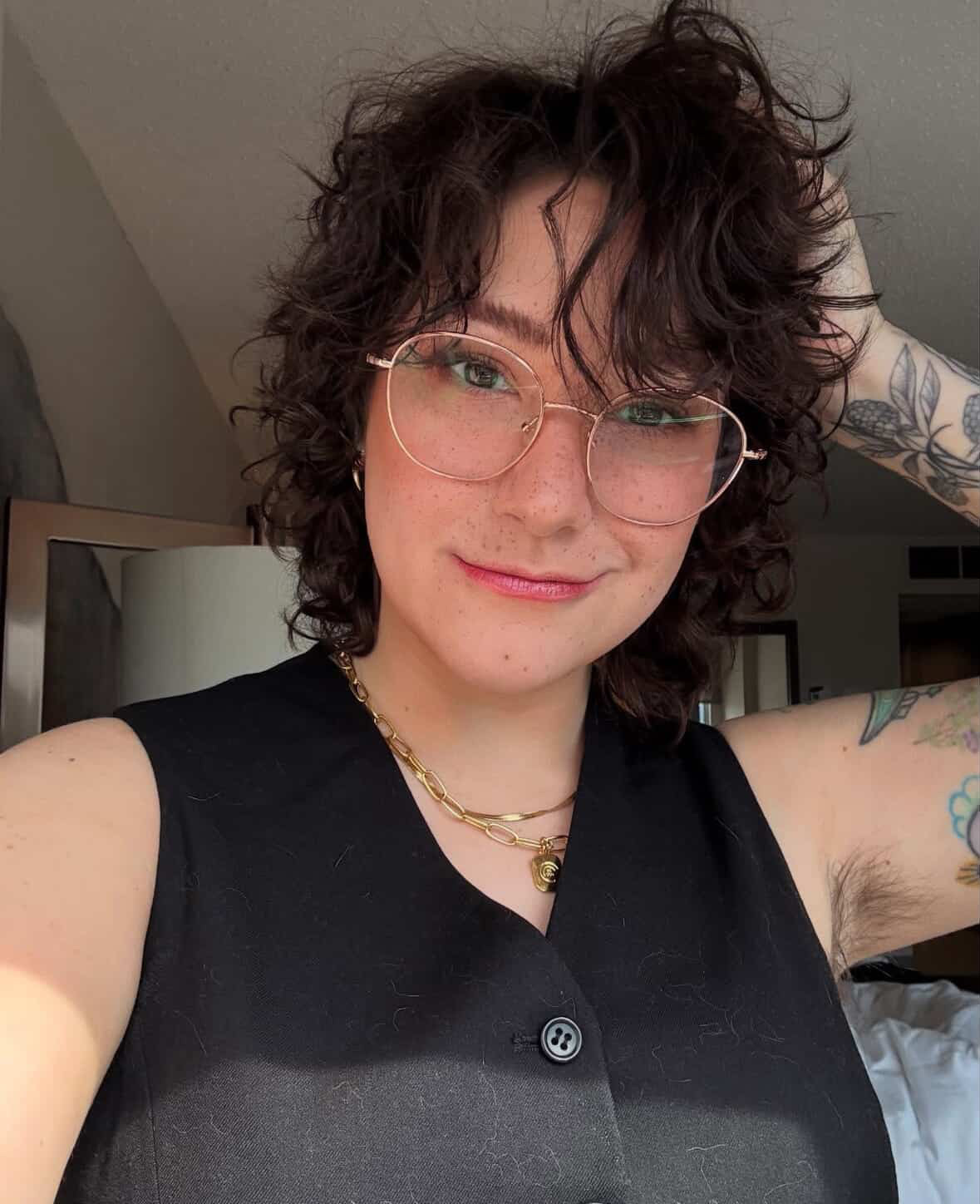
- Maggs in 2025
- Born: November 10, 1988 (age 38); London, Ontario, Canada
- Education: University of Western Ontario (BA); Toronto Metropolitan University (MA)
- Spouse: Blair Brown (m. 2018; div. 2022)
- Writing career
- Notable works: The Fangirl's Guide to the Galaxy; Marvel Action: Captain Marvel; Rick and Morty: Ever After
- Notable awards: Amazon national bestseller, 2015, 2016; Dragon Award nominee, 2020
- Website: sammaggs.com

Sam Maggs (born November 10, 1988) is a Canadian-American author of books, comics and video games, and is known especially for her work on The Fangirl's Guide to the Galaxy, Marvel Action: Captain Marvel, and Rick and Morty: Ever After.

== Early life and education ==
Maggs was born in London, Ontario, Canada. She credits her parents with her love of "geeky fandom", telling the Calgary Herald that "[My] parents were both really big nerds who saw Star Wars over 20 times in theatres." She received her formative education at the Lester B. Pearson School for the Arts and London Central Secondary School.

She received her Bachelor of Arts in English language and literature and film studies from the University of Western Ontario in 2010, where she studied Victorian literature and sensation fiction. In the fall of 2016, she appeared on the cover of the Western Alumni Gazette. After her BA, Maggs earned a Master's Degree in literatures of modernity from Toronto Metropolitan University, completed in 2011.

== Career ==
Maggs began her writing career as the weekend editor of the Abrams Media site Geekosystem, which was eventually consolidated into the feminist-leaning geek culture commentary site The Mary Sue. Following this merger, she took on an associate editor role.

As an entertainment journalist, Maggs has also contributed to io9, Tor.com, Time Out London, National Post, Marie Claire, The Guardian, PC Gamer, BuzzFeed, and Barnes & Noble.

=== Books ===
While at The Mary Sue, Maggs sold her first book, The Fangirl's Guide to the Galaxy, to Quirk Books. It was published in 2015. A second edition, titled the Fangirl's Guide to the Universe and featuring updated text and new illustrations, was released October 27, 2020. A companion guided journal, The Fangirl's Journal for Leveling Up: Conquer Your Life Through Fandoms, came out on the same day.

Maggs followed up her debut with Wonder Women: 25 Innovators, Inventors and Trailblazers Who Changed History, also from Quirk Books, in 2016. Dubbed "extraordinary" by Entertainment Weekly, the book shares the histories of notable women in the STEM fields, adventure, and espionage. In 2018, she published Girl Squads: 20 Female Friendships That Changed History with Quirk Books, which Booklist referred to as "impressively researched and fascinating". Both publications reflect Maggs' desire to celebrate the overlooked accomplishments of women throughout history and the power of female friendships and women supporting women.

In addition, Maggs has penned two encyclopedias about women superheroes for DK: Marvel Fearless and Fantastic! Female Super Heroes Save the World, published in 2018, and DC Brave and Bold!, published in 2019.

She made her middle grade novel debut in June 2020 with the publication of Con Quest! from Imprint/Macmillan Publishers. The story follows a pair of twins as they run away from their older sister for a chance to meet one of their favorite celebrities at a giant comics and pop culture convention. Kirkus gave it a starred review.

In July 2020, she released her first young adult novel, The Unstoppable Wasp: Built on Hope via Marvel Press. The book follows the third Wasp, Nadia van Dyne, as she learns to balance her science career with school, superheroes, and the general stress and strain that comes with being a teenager.

Her books have been translated into Turkish, Portuguese, Korean, and French.

=== Comics ===
In her first foray into comics, Maggs penned a story titled "Legacy" for IDW Publishing's Star Trek: Waypoint #2 in 2016. Her story filled in the life and experiences of the series' first-ever female redshirt, and she told SyFy Wire that, "It's easy to forget, when you're watching any sci-fi, that the goons and extras and henchmen who die for the sake of plot momentum or main character development are all (hypothetically) people with their own lives and families and stories… Now, [Thompson] isn't just another one of the faceless masses who die so Kirk may live. I wanted to make sure that you knew why she would have sacrificed her life."

Maggs has also written for the comic book adaptations of Jem and the Holograms (IDW), Rick & Morty (Oni Press), My Little Pony (IDW), Transformers (IDW), and Invader Zim (Oni Press). Maggs is the writer of two graphic novels which are part of the Critical Role comics anthology The Mighty Nein Origins published by Dark Horse Comics.

She also wrote Marvel Action: Captain Marvel for IDW, where the inclusion of characters like Squirrel Girl, Nadia van Dyne/Unstoppable Wasp, and Spider-Woman continue to reflect her favored theme of the strength to be found in female friendship.

Other projects include the Viz Media manga adaptation of Rainbow Rowell's bestselling YA novel Fangirl, with illustrations by Gabi Nam, released on October 13, 2020. Her first full-length original graphic novel Tell No Tales: Pirates of the Southern Seas, co-created with Kendra Wells and published by the Abrams Books imprint Amulet Books, released on February 9, 2021. The story revolves around the real-life pirating adventures of Anne Bonny and Mary Read.

=== Video games ===
From 2016 through 2018, Maggs worked as an associate writer for the video game studio BioWare, where she contributed writing to the Cards Against Humanity: Mass Effect pack. She also wrote for the online game Anthem, specifically the asexual character Ryssa Brin.

After BioWare, Maggs went on to serve as a writer for Insomniac Games, working as a writer for the Spider-Man: The City That Never Sleeps DLC.

She self-credits herself as lead writer for Ratchet & Clank: Rift Apart despite her name not appearing in the official credits of the game and engaged in a public feud with Insomniac lead designer Mark Stuart alleging that he took credit for her work. She left the studio in January 2020, before the game was released, and went on to work with Sledgehammer Games as a writer for the campaign of Call of Duty: Vanguard.

== Awards and recognition ==
=== Fangirl's Guide to the Galaxy ===
- Amazon national bestseller
- Barnes & Noble Bookseller's Top Pick, May 2015
- Globe & Mail bestseller
- Goodreads' Choice nominee in humor, 2015
- YALSA Top 10 Quick Picks for Reluctant Young Adult Readers selection, 2016

=== Wonder Women: 25 Innovators, Inventors and Trailblazers Who Changed History ===
- Amazon National Bestseller
- Chicago Public Library's Best of the Best, 2016
- IndieBound's Indie Next List Great Read selection, 2016
- Ontario Library Association's Best Bets Top Ten Reads for Teens
- ALA's Amelia Bloomer Book List, 2017

=== Con Quest! ===
- Kirkus Starred Review, 2020

=== Marvel Action: Captain Marvel ===
- Joel Schuster Awards Dragon Award nominee, 2020

== Personal life ==
Maggs is openly lesbian and dedicates herself to including queer representation in her writing. Prior to 2022, Maggs was openly bisexual.

== Bibliography ==
=== Books ===
Year	Title	Publisher	Ref.
2015	The Fangirl's Guide to the Galaxy	Quirk Books	
2016	Wonder Women: 25 Innovators, Inventors, and Trailblazers Who Changed History	Quirk Books	
2018	Girl Squads: 20 Female Friendships that Changed History	Quirk Books	
2018	Marvel Fearless and Fantastic!	DK	
2018	DC Brave and Bold!	DK	
2020	The Fangirl's Guide to the Universe	Quirk Books	
2020	The Fangirl's Journal for Leveling Up	Quirk Books	
2020	Con Quest!	Imprint/MacMillan	
2020	The Unstoppable Wasp: Built on Hope	Marvel	
2023	Star Wars Jedi: Battle Scars	Random House Worlds	

=== Comics and graphic novels ===
- Star Trek: Waypoint #2 (2016, IDW)
- Jem and the Holograms: Dimensions #3 (2018, IDW)
- My Little Pony: Friendship is Magic Vol. 18 (trade paperback, 2020, IDW, ISBN 978-1684056156) includes:
  - My Little Pony: Friendship is Magic #79–80
- Invader Zim #40 (2019, Oni Press)
- Transformers: All Fall Down Vol. 3 (trade paperback, 2019, IDW, ISBN 978-1684057399) includes:
  - Transformers #7–9
- Fangirl (manga adaptation)
  - Fangirl, Vol. 1 (manga, 2020, Viz Media, ISBN 978-1974715879)
  - Fangirl, Vol. 2 (manga, 2022, Viz Media, ISBN 978-1974718092)
- Marvel Action: Captain Marvel
  - Marvel Action: Captain Marvel: Cosmic Cat-astrophe Vol. 1 (trade paperback, 2020, IDW, ISBN 978-1684056248) collects:
    - Marvel Action: Captain Marvel #1–3
  - Marvel Action: Captain Marvel: A.I.M Small Vol. 2 (trade paperback, 2020, IDW, ISBN 978-1684056842) collects:
    - Marvel Action: Captain Marvel #4–6
- Rick & Morty Ever After Vol. 1 (trade paperback, 2021, Oni Press, ISBN 9781620108819) collects:
  - Rick & Morty Ever After #1–4
- Tell No Tales: Pirates of the Southern Seas (graphic novel, 2021, Abrams Books, ISBN 9781419739804)
- My Little Pony/Transformers
  - My Little Pony/Transformers: Friendship in Disguise! (trade paperback, 2021, IDW, ISBN 978-1684057597) includes:
    - My Little Pony/Transformers: Friendship in Disguise! #2–3
  - My Little Pony/Transformers: The Magic of Cybertron (trade paperback, 2021, IDW, ISBN 978-1684058709) includes:
    - My Little Pony/Transformers: The Magic of Cybertron #1–2
- Critical Role: The Mighty Nein Origins
  - Critical Role: The Mighty Nein Origins – Jester Lavorre (graphic novel, 2021, Dark Horse Comics, ISBN 978-1506723761)
  - Critical Role: The Mighty Nein Origins – Nott the Brave (graphic novel, 2023, Dark Horse Comics, ISBN 9781506723785)
  - Critical Role: The Mighty Nein Origins – Acquired Taste (Free Comic Book Day issue, Dark Horse Comics)
- Dungeons & Dragons: Saturday Morning Adventures #1–4 (2023, IDW)

=== Video games ===
Year	Title	Developer	Ref.
2017	Cards Against Humanity: Mass Effect pack	Bioware	
2018	Marvel's Spider-Man: The City That Never Sleeps – Turf Wars	Insomniac Games	
2019	Anthem	Bioware	
2021	Dungeons and Dragons: Dark Alliance	Wizards of the Coast	
2021	Call of Duty: Vanguard	Sledgehammer Games	
2022	Tiny Tina's Wonderlands	Gearbox	

=== Anthologies ===
Year	Title	Publisher	Ref.
2014	The Language of Doctor Who: From Shakespeare to Alien Tongues	Rowman & Littlefield Publishers	
2014	Chicks Dig Gaming	Mad Norwegian Press	
2015	Outside In 2: 125 Unique Perspectives on 125 Modern Doctor Who Stories by 125 Writers	ATB Publishing	
2016	The Secret Loves of Geek Girls	Dark Horse	
2018	Becoming Dangerous: Witchy Femmes, Queer Conjurers, and Magical Rebels on Summoning the Power to Resist	Weiser Book	
