= Mr. Meeseeks =

- Rick and Morty character
- First appearance: "Meeseeks and Destroy" (2014)
- Created by: Justin Roiland; Dan Harmon; Ryan Ridley
- Designed by: Justin Roiland
- Inspired by: Scud by Rob Schrab
- Voiced by: Justin Roiland (2014–2020)

In-universe information
- Full name: Mister Meeseeks
- Species: Meeseeks
- Gender: Male
- Occupation: Task completer
- Affiliation: Meeseeks Manufacturing Inc.
- Creator: Meeseeks Box
- Catchphrase: "I'm Mr. Meeseeks, look at me!"

Mr. Meeseeks is a recurring fictional species in the American animated television series Rick and Morty. Created by Justin Roiland and Dan Harmon and based on the title character from Scud: The Disposable Assassin by Rob Schrab, Meeseeks are a powder-blue-skinned species of humanoids (each of whom is named "Mr. Meeseeks") who are created to serve a single purpose which they will go to any length to fulfill. Each brought to life by a "Meeseeks Box", they typically live for no more than a few hours in a constant state of pain, vanishing upon completing their assigned task so as to end their own existence and thereby end their suffering; as such, the longer an individual Meeseeks remains alive, the more insane and unhinged they become.

== Biography ==
Each Mr. Meeseeks is a tall, blue-skinned humanoid figure with elongated, narrow limbs, a large, bulbous head, beady black eyes, and a high-pitched voice. Some versions of him have one or more small patches of orange hair on their head, while others are bald. Mr. Meeseeks usually exhibits a friendly, cheerful, and helpful demeanor, willing to assist the one who brought him into existence, however possible, in order to ensure their own death. Ideally, Mr. Meeseeks will dispatch the simple task given to him, and disappear shortly after its completion. However, if given a task that is outside of Mr. Meeseeks' capabilities, he will not be able to cease existing. This unusual lifespan will cause Mr. Meeseeks' attitude and mental state to worsen dramatically; the relatively long and tortuous existence quickly driving him to a dishevelled appearance, violent behavior and outright insanity, including creating more Meeseeks to assist themselves if they have access to a Meeseeks Box. All Mr. Meeseeks will typically say "I'm Mr. Meeseeks, look at me!" upon being created.

=== Television series ===
In "Meeseeks and Destroy", Jerry, Beth and Summer Smith are given a Meeseeks Box by Rick Sanchez to provide solutions to their problems: for Jerry, taking two strokes off his golf game; for Beth, making her feel better about herself; and for Summer, to make her popular at her high school. While Beth and Summer are successful with one Meeseeks each, Jerry ultimately summons dozens of them yet is unable to achieve his goal. As Jerry goes to dinner with Beth, the increasingly desperate Meeseeks initially blame each other for their predicament and fight over the correct solution, concluding that their only hope is a loophole: to take all the strokes off Jerry's golf game by killing him. Confronting Jerry in a restaurant, the Meeseeks take the other patrons hostage to convince Jerry to come out. Before he can give in, however, Beth inspires Jerry and encourages him to try his golf swing one last time. Jerry uses a broken shelf and tomato in place of a golf club and ball to show that his game has improved, and the delighted Meeseeks cease to exist.

In the background of "Mortynight Run", a Mr. Meeseeks can be seen at the Blips & Chitz arcade, helping an alien win a video game before disappearing when they eventually win. A pair of Mr. Meeseeks are visible in the Collector's menagerie in a segment of "Morty's Mind Blowers".

In "Edge of Tomorty: Rick Die Rickpeat", Rick summons a Meeseeks to kill an alternate dimension version of Morty, known as Fascist Morty, while the power-mad normal Morty summons several Meeseeks to protect him from the local police. Upon returning to his laboratory, Rick notes that Morty has stolen his Meeseeks Boxes, leaving only his Kirkland-brand Meeseeks Boxes, which summon a surly and uncooperative smoking red-skinned Mr. Meeseeks variant. In a flashforward in "Never Ricking Morty", President Morty is shown to command an army of Meeseeks amongst his various other armies.

=== Comic series ===
==== Presents ====
In June 2019, an Oni Press Rick and Morty comic series spin-off one-shot, Rick and Morty Presents: Mr. Meeseeks was released, following a Mr. Meeseeks who, after being called upon by Summer Smith to assist with her chili recipe, accidentally tasks another Meeseeks to bring them on a journey to find meaning to life despite their finite existence. A previous one-shot, The Vindicators, also featured Mr. Meeseeks in Rick using one to unleash an army to defeat Boon (an alternate evil and all-powerful Noob Noob).

==== Main series ====
A drug mule Meeseeks known as Mr. Sick is featured as a recurring antagonist in the Rick and Morty comic series, working for Peacock Jones to seek revenge on Rick after failing to deliver the singular drug shipment he was created for, culminating in his death in Rick Revenge Squad on being tricked into finally making the delivery. Consequently, an alternate Jones uses a Meeseeks Box to create himself an army to kill Rick in The Rickoning, which Rick tricks into dissolving by having most of them "kill" holograms of his, and the last one "kill" his character in a video game.

==== Crisis on C-137 ====
A Meeseeks called Master Meeseeks is featured as the main antagonist of the limited series Rick and Morty: Crisis on C-137, which began publication in August 2022. In the series, on surviving the events of "Meeseeks and Destroy", Master Meeseeks gathers together the enemies of the Smith family in an attempt to take his revenge upon them.

==== Meeseeks, P.I. ====
A limited series, Rick and Morty: Meeseeks, P.I., began publication in November 2023, following a Meeseeks hired by Jerry as a private detective (named Meeseeks, P.I.) to help him find the missing remote to the interdimensional cable television box before Rick finds out, the two uncovering a massive interdimensional cable conspiracy in the process.

=== Video games ===
Meeseeks Boxes are featured as power-ups and loot boxes in the free-to-play role-playing video game Pocket Mortys, producing Meeseeks for the player to use in battles, as well as in the virtual reality game Rick and Morty: Virtual Rick-ality, where a variant dubbed Mr. Youseeks can be summoned to aid in unreachable chores. In 2022, Mr. Meeseeks Ace was added as a character skin to Tom Clancy's Rainbow Six Siege.

== Development ==
The character was created by Justin Roiland and Dan Harmon, who first met at Channel 101 in the early 2000s. In 2006, Roiland created The Real Animated Adventures of Doc and Mharti, an animated short parodying the Back to the Future characters Doc Brown and Marty McFly, and the precursor to Rick and Morty, the second episode of which features the pair encountering the title character Scud of Scud: The Disposable Assassin, whom Harmon had written for from 1994 to 1998, serving to promote the series' 2008 revival. At Stan Lee's L.A. Comic Con: Comikaze in 2016, Harmon confirmed that the Mr. Meeseeks character had been "ripped off" from Scud. After the idea for Rick and Morty, in the form of Doc and Mharti was brought up to Adult Swim and a full television series entered development, Roiland had the idea for the episode "Meeseeks and Destroy" when, frustrated with the progress of a writing session, he suggested the introduction of a character who would blurt "I'm Mister Meeseeks, look at me!" in a "most annoying" voice, which was then combined with Harmon's variation on Rob Schrab's Scud character, each member of the species uttering the catchphrase upon being created or making a point. Series writer Ryan Ridley also cited The Smurfs as an inspiration for the character.

== Merchandise ==
On August 3, 2016, Cryptozoic Entertainment released Mr. Meeseeks' Box o' Fun, a game combining elements of dice games and truth or dare focused around the Mr. Meeseeks character. On September 23, 2019, Entertainment Earth launched a range of Mr. Meeseeks jack-in-the-boxes and dolls to positive reception. On September 10, 2020, Kidrobot launched a Mr. Meeseeks-themed line of eight-inch dunny figurines, while Pringles launched a Mr. Meeseeks-themed flavor called "Look at Me! I'm Cheddar & Sour Cream", with the product description reading "Mr. Meeseeks' tall, powder-blue figure is naturally emulated in this narrow can of Pringles crisps. Since existence is pain for a Meeseeks, you better eat these crisps fast—which should be no problem given how delicious these flavors are."

== Reception ==
Year	Award	Category	Nominee(s)	Result	Ref.
2015	BTVA Voice Acting Awards	Best Male Lead Vocal Performance in a Television Series — Comedy/Musical	Justin Roiland	Won	

The character has received positive reception. Looper described Mr. Meeseeks as "a symbol of the series", citing "his appeal [a]s the genie-in-a-bottle fantasy element" that the character provides as "a meditation on the nature of existence, setting the template for the show's ever-more frequent forays into philosophical contemplation." Screen Rant praised the character as a "cult hero", while Inverse comparatively compared the character to Michael Keaton's 1996 film Multiplicity, praising their "story circle". The Daily Dot described "[p]art of the charm of Meeseeks [a]s that their looping dialogue is so quotable, but fans also seem to relate to Mr. Meeseeks’ deterioration from happy and helpful to frustrated and murderous. Meeseeks’ dark reality—that they’re chipper despite living in pain and wanting to die—also makes them extra sympathetic." GameSpot has stated that "there has been no character who has caused as lasting an impact [on the Rick and Morty franchise] as Mr. Meeseeks", while Jake Lahut praised the character as "[r]esembling something between Gumby and the Smurfs, [as] a species who embod[ies] Aristotle’s key theory of teleology, the idea of design and purpose in each material thing." With regards their initial portrayal, Comic Book Resources described the characters as "very unique and fascinating to watch play out onscreen", while CinemaBlend collectively ranked the species as the second-best side character in the series behind President Morty. Den of Geek praised the character as a vindication of "[the] sort of outwardly happy folks [who] live a rich inner life of endless torment" and the concept of "@#%&*! Smilers", as titled by the Aimee Mann album of the same name.
