= Rick and Morty: Ever After =

Novel written by Sam Maggs

Rick and Morty: Ever After is a four-issue comic book mini-series written by Sam Maggs and illustrated by Sarah Stern. The mini-series, based on the television series and franchise of the same name by Justin Roiland and Dan Harmon, was released in four parts between October 2020 and January 2021 by Oni Press.The story revolves around Rick and Morty as they traverse the fairytale realm of Avalonia, facing off against a witch and an evil king who seeks to invade Earth.

== Summary ==
The comic follows Rick and Morty as they are trapped in the fairytale world of Avalonia from the book Tales of Avalonia: Sad Stories for Bad Children by Rick's Osmonator. Teaming up with Sir Silke, Marius, and the Witch (resembling Jessica), the two face off against the realm's evil king (resembling Jerry, who seeks to invade reality) as they quest to return home.

== Premise ==
=== Part One ===
Morty finds himself struggling with his school reading, a bleak folklore tome proving too daunting to conquer. Despite Jessica finally showing interest in connecting with him over the book, Morty's progress is slow. Fortunately, Rick has just completed his latest invention: a device promising to imbue the reader with all of a book's knowledge in mere seconds. But as with many of Rick's creations, things quickly spiral out of control. Instead of a quick fix, Morty and Rick find themselves inexplicably transported into the very pages of the book. Rick awakens in the guise of a sorcerer, surrounded by arcane tools and ancient tomes. Meanwhile, Morty finds himself transformed into a humble squire, trapped within the confines of a towering castle. Together, they're thrust into an adventure unlike any they've faced before in the vast expanse of the multiverse.

=== Part Two ===
Trapped within the enchanted confines of a fairy tale book, Wizard Rick finds himself commissioned by the king to vanquish an ominous witch who's been snaring the kingdom's children. Initially hesitant to pursue this matter, Rick's resolve solidifies when he learns that the witch has ensnared Morty, his own grandson. Thus, with a reluctant but loyal dim-witted knight by his side, Rick embarks on a perilous journey into the foreboding depths of the forest. Meanwhile, Morty's path intersects with another valiant knight before Rick's arrival. This knight, a captivating woman, ensures Morty's safety, though the duo faces the daunting task of traversing the treacherous forest to return to the safety of the castle. However, Rick soon discovers that the truth about the missing children may not align with the king's decree. As they investigate deeper into the mysteries of the magical realm, Morty and Rick find themselves grappling with forces beyond their comprehension.

=== Part Three ===
As Rick ventures through the ominous Dank Forest alongside the realm's champion, he faces a daunting challenge: confronting a clone of himself. This task proves to be one of his toughest yet, testing his skills and cunning in unexpected ways. Meanwhile, Morty grapples with his own daunting mission: learning the art of conversing with women. This becomes particularly complicated as he finds himself in the company of Ser Silke, the female knight. Fortunately, fate brings the two groups together just as the malevolent witch makes her appearance. However, her true intentions quickly come to light, revealing that she is not the true adversary. With time running short, the fate of the realms hangs in the balance, urging Rick, Morty, and their companions to act swiftly.

=== Part Four ===
Trapped in a fantasty realm, Rick and Morty seek a means of escape, their only hope lying in the defeat of the malevolent king bent on world destruction. Differing in their approaches, Morty opts for subtlety while Rick charges ahead with full force. Yet, both strategies falter, thwarting their individual efforts. With time running out, they realize that their only chance lies in collaboration. United, Rick and Morty must pool their strengths if they ever hope to break free from the clutches of the fantasy world and return to reality.

== Reception ==
Issue #	Publication Date	Critic Rating	Ref
1	October 28, 2020	6.0/10	
2	November 25, 2020	8.0/10	
3	December 23, 2020	6.0/10	
4	January 20, 2021	4.0/10	
Overall		6.0/10	

The series has received a generally positive critical reception.

=== Part One ===
ComicBook.com's Charlie Ridgely says that "Rick and Morty" is special because it has a unique tone that's hard to copy. He thinks some licensed stuff based on the show tries to copy it but doesn't do it well. "Ever After #1" is like that sometimes—it feels like "Rick and Morty" but other times not really. However, the story is interesting enough to make people want to keep reading.

=== Part Two ===
ComicBook.com's Charlie Ridgely thinks that "Rick and Morty" fans will enjoy this story because it feels like a real episode of the show. In the second issue, Rick's character feels authentic, but Morty still seems a bit off, probably because his creator's voice gives him his unique personality. Overall, the story is improving, and Ridgely is now looking forward to the next issue more than before.

=== Part Three ===
ComicBook.com's Charlie Ridgely pointed out that as the mini-series progresses, Rick and Morty become more true to their characters. However, the story itself becomes less captivating. But that's not necessarily a bad thing, since part of the appeal of the franchise is going on adventures with Rick and Morty that don't always have a clear destination. Overall, it remained an enjoyable to read and fits with the spirit of the series.

=== Part Four ===
ComicBook.com's Charlie Ridgely takeaway in the final issue of this miniseries is that the adventure started with excitement and promise. Rick and Morty were true to their characters, the dialogue was excellent, and the interactions between all the characters were well-thought-out. It seemed like the finale was going to be great. However, it didn't turn out that way. The third act quickly spiraled into a messy ending that didn't accomplish much. The whole story just ended abruptly, making the exciting buildup in the first 15 pages feel wasted. It was disappointing given its strong start.
