= Pocket Mortys =

Role-playing video game

- App icon
- Developers: Big Pixel Studios, Tag Games, Pocket Sized Hands
- Publisher: Adult Swim Games
- Platforms: iOS, Android
- Release: WW: January 13, 2016
- Genre: Role-playing
- Modes: Single-player, multiplayer

Pocket Mortys, also known as Rick and Morty: Pocket Mortys, was a free-to-play role-playing video game developed by Big Pixel Studios, Tag Games and Pocket Sized Hands and published by Adult Swim Games. The game was released worldwide on January 13, 2016 for iOS and Android devices. The game was based on the television series and franchise Rick and Morty and the mechanics served as a parody/remake of the Pokémon franchise, being updated each episode with new playable characters based on those from the wider franchise every year since. On January 13, 2026, the ten-year anniversary of the game, it was announced that it would shut down on April 13, 2026.

Two comic book adaptations, Pocket Mortys (2016) and Pocket Like You Stole It (2017), written by Tini Howard, have been published by Oni Press.

== Description ==
Pocket Mortys is based on the multiple timeline concept as described in episode 10 of season 1, "Close Rick-counters of the Rick Kind". The game uses a style and concept similar to the Pokémon games, with the player (Rick C-123) catching various 'wild' Mortys, battling them with a variety of 'Trainers' in the form of aliens, Ricks and several supporting characters. The game features voice acting from Justin Roiland and Dan Harmon.

=== Gameplay ===
Pocket Mortys is in a third-person view, overhead perspective and consists of three basic screens: an overworld, in which the player navigates the main character; a side-view battle screen; and a menu interface, in which the player configures their Mortys, items, or gameplay settings.

The player can use their Mortys to battle other Mortys. Supposedly the strongest Morty so far is The One True Morty later revealed in the game. Wild Mortys are visible on the overworld and can be battled. "Trainer" fights are also visible and entail fighting against their party of up to five Mortys. When the player encounters a Morty or a trainer, the screen switches to a turn-based battle screen that displays the engaged Mortys. During battle, the player may select a maneuver for their Morty to use in the fight, use an item, switch their active Morty, or (against the wild Mortys) attempt to flee. Mortys have hit points (HP); when a Morty's HP is reduced to zero, it gets dazed and can no longer battle until it is revived. Once an enemy Morty faints, the player's Morty involved in the battle receive a certain number of experience points (EXP). After accumulating enough EXP, a Morty will level up. A Morty's level controls its physical properties, such as the battle statistics acquired, and the moves learned. The player may combine two Mortys of the same type to evolve them; these evolutions affect the statistics and which moves are learned. Catching wild Mortys is another essential element of the gameplay. During battle with a wild Morty, the player may throw a Manipulation Chip at it. If the Morty is successfully caught, it will come under the ownership of the player.

The ultimate goal of the game is to collect and level-up a team of Mortys to battle against the Council of Ricks, who have taken Rick's portal gun until he proves himself to be worthy of getting it back.

=== Playable characters ===
Playable characters are divided into two main roles: Trainers and Mortys.

The current list of playable recurring characters in the game currently include:

Trainers: (boys) Rick Sanchez, Jerry Smith, Bigfoot, Mr. Goldenfold, The Observer, Gearhead, The President, Roy, Bruce Chutback, Mr. Nimbus, Terryfold, Mr. Butthole, Noob Noob, Concerto, Jaguar, Hemorrhage, Scary Terry, Squanchy, and Sleepy Gary; (girls) Summer Smith, Beth Smith, Virtual Diane, Dr. Helen Wong, Jerry's Mom (Joyce Smith), Princess Poneta, Planetina, and Morty's Girlfriend

Mortys: (boys) Morty Smith Sr., Mortydrangea, Morty Smith Jr., Kissing Cats Morty, Mytholog Morty, Pringles MortyBot, Larry, and The Child of Gaia; (cis girls) Mindy "Morticia" Smith, Mortaion Morty, Marta, Mortabel Pines–Smith (Girl Morty), Wendy Morty, Supernova Morty, Tammy Morty, and Businesswoman Morty; (trans girls) Princess/Queen Morty and Roller Derby Morty

== Comic series ==
Rick and Morty: Pocket Like You Stole It
- No. of issues: 5
- Publisher: Oni Press

Creative team
- Writers: Tini Howard
- Colourists: Katy Farina
- ISBN: 978-1-6201-0416-3

Two spin-off comic book adaptations, Rick and Morty in: Pocket Mortys and Rick and Morty: Pocket Like You Stole It, written by Tini Howard, have been published by Oni Press, respectively released on September 28, 2016 and from July 5 to November 22, 2017.

== Reception ==
The game received "mixed or average" reception, according to review aggregator Metacritic. PC Magazine gave the game a rating of 3.5/5, and Patricia Hernandez of Kotaku stated that the game was "brilliant".

IGN was not as favourable in its review, giving the game a "mediocre" 5.5 rating, stating that the game "lacks cohesion" and that it was "little more than a diluted Pokémon imitator". HardcoreGamer mirrored this opinion by giving the game a score of 2.5/5. With the commercial success of the game, it prompted Adult Swim Games to acquire Big Pixel Studios two years and four months later on May 21, 2018.
