= Rick and Morty: Virtual Rick-ality =

2017 video game

- Developer: Owlchemy Labs
- Publisher: Adult Swim Games
- Engine: Unity
- Platforms: HTC Vive, PlayStation VR, Oculus Rift
- Release: Microsoft Windows; April 20, 2017; PlayStation 4; April 10, 2018
- Genre: Adventure game
- Mode: Single-player

Rick and Morty: Virtual Rick-ality is a virtual reality game compatible with HTC Vive, PlayStation VR and Oculus Rift developed by Owlchemy Labs and published by Adult Swim Games for Microsoft Windows on April 20, 2017. It is based on the American animated series Rick and Morty, whose series co-creator Justin Roiland aided in the development. A port for the PlayStation 4 was released on April 10, 2018.

== Gameplay ==
Clone Morty interacts with his surroundings.

Using HTC Vive, PlayStation VR or Oculus Rift, the player controls V.R. Morty, the clone of Morty Smith, the grandson of mad scientist Rick Sanchez. The clone was created to help Rick and Morty with menial tasks, such as laundry and spaceship repair. He is given a wristwatch from which a hologram of Rick appears to relay orders. Movement from one spot to another is done by warping, and a being called Mr. Youseeks (Note: Mr. Meeseeks in the TV series.) can be summoned to aid in unreachable chores.

== Plot ==
Rick creates a clone of his grandson Morty in their garage, demanding that he do the laundry. With the chore complete, Rick explains the clone is not of use anymore and shoots him. Clone Morty appears in Purgatory, but is given the choice to return to the garage. The next chore is to obtain a device from outside the garage, but since the clone is not allowed to leave, he summons a being called Mr. Youseeks that imitates his every motion to aid in his task. The device is revealed to be faulty. Rick says to order another, but the computer must be repaired to do so. The new device is delivered, which Clone Morty attaches to a plunger to retrieve a seed stuck in the toilet.

The seed is employed to upgrade Rick's spaceship, but eventually it breaks down at a celestial nature preserve. Clone Morty teleports to the scene, where they are caught trespassing. Rick equips Clone Morty with firearms to fight off the Galactic Federation while the spaceship is being repaired. However, Clone Morty is abandoned at the nature preserve and is instructed to commit suicide. In Purgatory, Clone Morty decides once more to return to the garage. He is commanded by Rick to incubate an egg found at the nature preserve until it hatches. From out of the egg hatches a childlike alien who has the clone complete a makeshift signalling device. When Rick returns to the garage, he kills the alien and leaves.

The antenna summons two increasingly large members of the alien's parents which Clone Morty defeats, before being killed and revived again. Back at the garage, two versions of Rick emerge and begin to fight. The clone must determine which of them to kill; the remaining version is run over by the spaceship of the real Rick, who kills Clone Morty for wielding a firearm. Clone Morty is greeted at the garage by Rick and Morty after a visit to Purgatory. Rick reveals that the past events were a ploy for Clone Morty to make an Omega Detergent by combining the seed and baby-alien goo, and do the laundry to perfection.

== Development ==
The idea for Owlchemy Labs to work on a virtual reality video game for Rick and Morty came after series co-creator Justin Roiland invited the development team to his residence to play games. The first drafts of dialog were written by Owlchemy Labs and rough voice recordings by Producer Andrew Eiche were sent to Roiland as a template for the final performance.

== Reception ==
Reception

Aggregate score
Aggregator	Score
Metacritic	75/100 (PC); 70/100 (PS4)

Review scores
Publication	Score
Destructoid	7/10
Game Informer	6.5/10
IGN	7.9/10

Virtual Rick-ality was met with "generally favourable" reviews on the PC and "mixed or average" reviews on the PS4, according to Metacritic.

Destructoid's Chris Carter thought the game exemplified the potential of virtual reality adventure games. He appreciated the banter done at the expense of the player character, and enjoyed the finale most when it broke the fourth wall. Joe Jube of Game Informer opined that it worked best when the original show was referenced, and was more entertaining when straying from one's assigned actions. Jon Ryan at IGN praised the pacing for the employment of puzzle solving, "environmental exploration, and the occasional shooting gallery". The variations of jobs to accomplish were found to be "interesting and enjoyable", and the manner in which one navigates the environment was lauded as "a smart solution".

Conversely, Carter criticized its optimization, citing issues of faulty controls, long loading screens and "severe" stuttering, all of which resulted in having to reboot the game. Jube complained that the required tasks became monotonous and presented a lack of engagement overall.

The game was nominated for the Coney Island Dreamland Award for Best Virtual Reality Game at the New York Game Awards 2018, and for "VR Game of the Year" at the 2018 SXSW Gaming Awards.
