= Troy Little =

Canadian comic writer

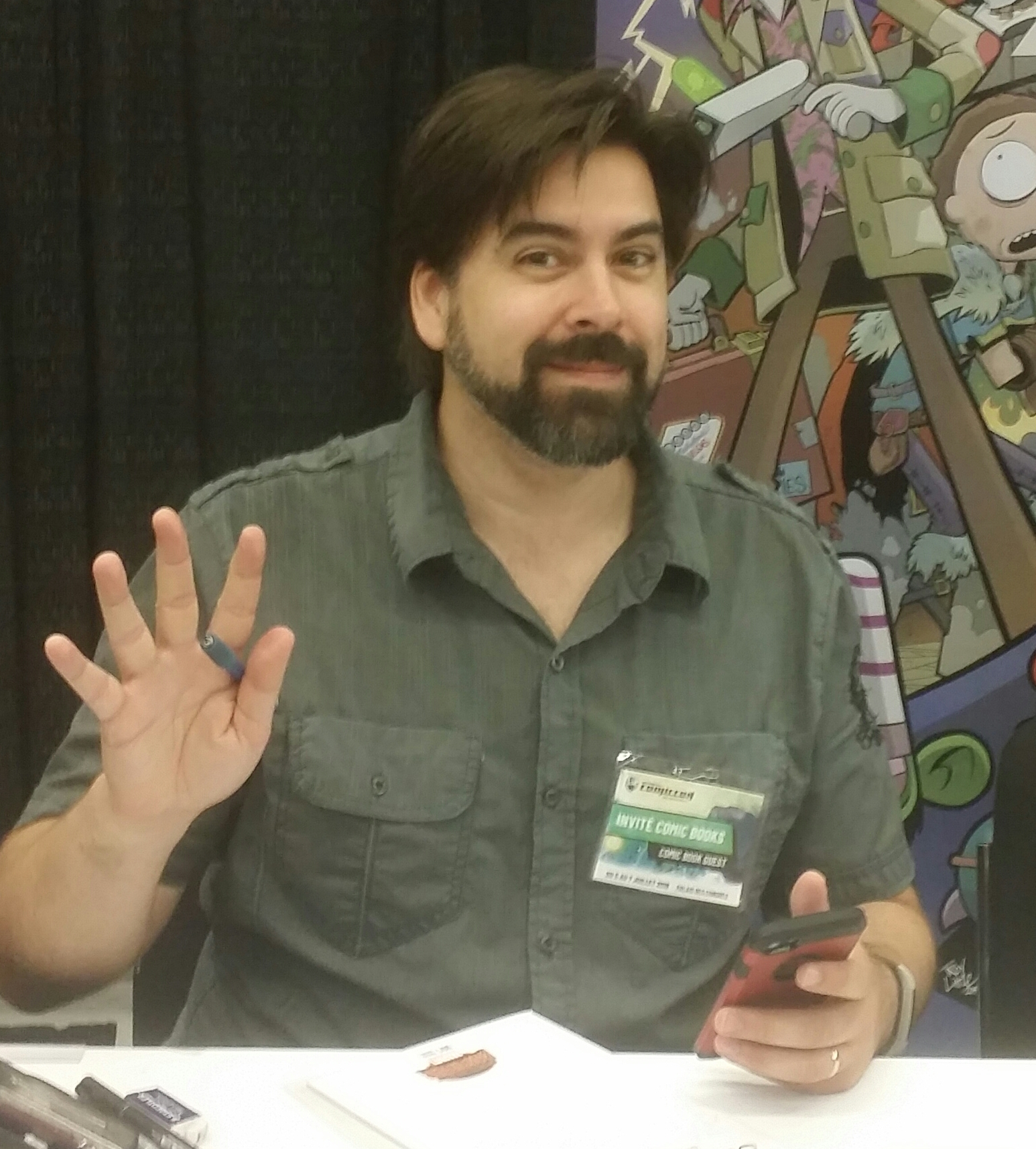
- Little in 2019
- Born: March 7, 1973 (age 53); Prince Edward Island, Canada
- Occupations: writer, cartoonist
- Writing career
- Period: 2000–present
- Notable work: Chiaroscuro (vol. 1: 2000-2005/2007)
- Notable awards: Xeric
- Website: pegamoosepress.com

Troy Little (born 7 March 1973) is a Canadian cartoonist working in comic books and animation. He began self publishing with Chiaroscuro, a graphic novel that was developed between 2000 and 2005 under his Meanwhile Studios imprint. After winning two grants (Xeric and P.E.I. Council of the Arts) and being praised by Dave Sim, Chiaroscuro vol. 1 was released in 2007 by IDW Publishing.

== Biography ==
Troy Little was born on 7 March 1973 in Prince Edward Island, Canada. An alumnus of Three Oaks Senior High School, he went on to graduate from the Interpretive Illustration program of Sheridan College in 1994, and spent many years working in animation. After living eight years in Ottawa, he moved back to Prince Edward Island. In the early 2000s, he began transitioning out of his job in animation to work full time in comics. He's worked on several licensed titles and also writes and draws his own graphic novels.

In September 2000, he started work on his self-published black and white comic series Chiaroscuro for which he was awarded in 2001 a Xeric Grant. The comic was published bi-monthly and ran for seven issues ending prematurely in 2003. Little eventually continued to draw the missing issues #8-10 to conclude the first volume. In 2005, he was awarded a P.E.I. Council of the Arts Grants to enable him to continue work on the series. In late 2005, he had completed his first storyline as the graphic novel Chiaroscuro: Patchwork Book 1 (collecting issues #1-10), and started sending out a 100-copy POD run to publishers.

In 2007, this first volume of Chiaroscuro received an excellent review by independent comics legend Dave Sim (creator of Cerebus) as written on his Blog & Mail. This review brought the book to the attention of Ted Adams, President of IDW Publishing in San Diego. IDW published a hardcover edition of the graphic novel in October 2007, and its trade paperback edition in October 2008.

In January 2009, Troy Little released Angora Napkin, a standalone graphic novel from IDW Publishing which was nominated for an Eisner Award. Angora Napkin was developed into an animated pilot for Teletoon's late night program "Teletoon at Night" for a series which was broadcast on Halloween night, 2010; but the pilot was never picked up. He later created a second Angora Napkin graphic novel, Harvest of Revenge, which was again nominated for an Eisner. He ventured into webcomics with the online serial Angora Napkin: The Golden McGuffin that ran sporadically from 2011 to 2019.

From 2013 to 2014, he wrote and drew the comic book series The Powerpuff Girls, published by IDW and based on the Cartoon Network animated series.

In 2015, Little was brought on by IDW / Top Shelf to adapt the authorized graphic novel version of Hunter S. Thompson's book Fear and Loathing in Las Vegas, published in late October / early November by Top Shelf Productions.

During the Fear and Loathing in Las Vegas book tour Little met Kevin Eastman, co-creator of the Teenage Mutant Ninja Turtles. In 2017, Eastman tapped Little to help develop his Drawing Blood / Radically Rearranged Ronin Ragdolls series which was successfully Kickstarted in published in 2018. This was followed by a second volume of Ragdolls that he illustrated and co-wrote with Drawing Blood writer David Avallone.

In 2018, Little teamed up with writers Jim Zub and Patrick Rothfuss for the limited series Rick and Morty vs. Dungeons & Dragons #1-4, published by IDW. This book was followed up in 2020 (without Rothfuss) with Volume 2: Painscape, published by Oni Press. The Rick and Morty vs Dungeons and Dragons Deluxe Edition, by Rothfuss, Zub, and Little, was nominated for the 2022 "Best Graphic Album—Reprint" Eisner Award.

Also in 2019, Troy and his wife Brenda Hickey ("My Little Pony", "Aggretsuko") formed their own imprint: Pegamoose Press. Their first book, Hickey's Halls of the Turnip King was successfully Kickstarted and published in early 2020. The second book, Angora Napkin: The Golden McGuffin was published in the fall of 2020. Troy and Brenda collaborated and published the innovative graphic novella Butterfly House which was nominated for a Sequential Award and a Doug Wright Award in 2022.

== Works ==
- 2001–2003: Chiaroscuro #1-7 (Meanwhile, Studios)
- 2004–2005: Chiaroscuro #8-10 (drawn but not published)
- 2005: Chiaroscuro: Patchwork Book 1 (100-copy POD demo, late 2005, collecting #1-10)
- 2007: Chiaroscuro HC (IDW Publishing, October 2007 hardcover collecting #1-10)
- 2008: Chiaroscuro TP (IDW Publishing, October 2008 softcover collecting #1-10)
- 2009: Angora Napkin (IDW Publishing, graphic novel)
- 2012: Angora Napkin: Harvest of Revenge (IDW Publishing, graphic novel)
- 2013: The Powerpuff Girls (IDW Publishing, comic series)
- 2015: Hunter S. Thompson's Fear and Loathing in Las Vegas (Top Shelf Productions)
- 2016: Angora Napkin: Cuddle Core Collection (IDW Publishing, graphic novel collection)
- 2018: Radically Rearranged Ronin Ragdolls (Kevin Eastman Studios, comic book)
- 2019: Rick & Morty VS Dungeons & Dragons (IDW Publishing, comic series)
- 2020: Rick & Morty VS Dungeons & Dragons: Painscape (Oni Press, comic series)
- 2020: Radically Rearranged Ronin Ragdolls Adventures (Kevin Eastman Studios, comic book)
- 2020: Angora Napkin: The Golden McGuffin (Pegamoose Press, graphic novel)
- 2022: Butterfly House (with Brenda Hickey)(Pegamoose Press, graphic novel)
- 2022: Rick & Morty VS Cthulhu (Oni Press, comic series)

== Sources ==
- CBC News (2007-09-07). "P.E.I. comic artist signs with major publisher". www.CBC.ca. Archived from the original on 2008-01-18.
- Journal Pioneer; Jim Brown (2007-11-06). "Little comic book writer poised to hit big time". www.JournalPioneer.com. Archived from the original on 2008-10-06.
- Troy Little. "About". www.MeanwhileStudios.com.
- Troy Little (October 2002). "Xeric winner speak: Chiaroscuro". www.Xeric Foundation.org. Archived from the original on 2008-01-23.
- Dave Sim (2007-01-17). "Dave Sim's blogandmail #128 (January 17th, 2007)". Blog & Mail. davesim.blogspot.com. Archived from the original on 2007-04-02. "Troy Little sent me a POD version of volume one of his graphic novel magnum opus Chiaroscuro [...] I was really, really impressed with what you have done with Chiaroscuro."
- Dave Sim (2007-07-12). "Dave Sim's blogandmail #304 (July 12th, 2007)". Blog & Mail. davesim.blogspot.com. Archived from the original on 2007-08-05. "I told Larry that I know Ted Adams at IDW reads the Blog & Mail on a regular basis and he actually picked up a couple of titles just because I mentioned them here. CHIAROSCURO was one of them."
- Xeric Foundation (September 2001). "Comic Book Self-Publishing Grants: September 2001". www.Xeric Foundation.org. Archived from the original on 2018-07-26.
