= Chiaroscuro (music) =

Chiaroscuro (Italian for "light-dark") is part of bel canto, an originally Italian classical singing technique in which a brilliant sound referred to as squillo is coupled with a dark timbre called scuro. The overall sound is often perceived as having great depth or warmth. Chiaroscuro is commonly used in opera. Within operatic singing, especially in Italian, the vowel "Ah" provides an example of where chiaroscuro can be used: the vowel must have a bright Italian sound, as well as depth and space in the tone, which is achieved through the use of breath and the body.

== History ==
=== Origins ===
The initial creation of chiaroscuro is not clear because the term was only used by 18th-century Italian composers. Some have argued that the concept of chiaroscuro was initially created in the 14th or 15th century. Early composers and theorists, such as Lodovico Zacconi in 1592, described their preferred tonal sound in detail that mirrored the Italian chiaroscuro style. Their discussions of a bright ringing in a vocalist's chest voice are arguably the earliest depictions of the light and dark singing style. Many artists such as Giulio Caccini would reinforce Zacconi's beliefs; in his Le nuove musiche, Caccini described the ideal sound as "a full natural voice, avoiding falsetto, and without being constrained to accommodate himself to others." Many German authors echoed this description of ideal Italian singing style: for example, in music theorist and composer Michael Praetorius' 1619 Syntagma musicum, which was reiterated by Johann Andreas Herbst in 1642, and again by Alexis de Garaudé in the early 19th century. In the 19th century, singer and teacher Manuel García began to delve deeper into the physical changes and challenges of singing in the Italian chiaroscuro style.

=== Early uses ===
The term chiaroscuro comes from the Italian school of singing. It was the ideal voice type quality in the 18th and 19th centuries for classical singers. The first time the term was used was in 1774, in Giovanni Battista Mancini's singing treatise Pensieri e riflessioni pratiche sopra il canto figurato, which was later translated into French, German, and English. Mancini wrote scales to be practiced slowly in order to master the art of coloring musical phrases with chiaroscuro. Composer and theorist Giovanni Battista Lamperti established chiaroscuro as the ideal tonal sound, believing it should always be present when singing. This is evident in written scores that encouraged vocalists to sing with a "light, dark tone", either at their own discretion or as required by the composers.

=== Modern uses ===
Today, chiaroscuro has become a standard of singing for modern vocalists across classical vocal genres. Richard Miller, a professor at Oberlin Conservatory of Music, describes modern chiaroscuro as the "cultivated artistic sound of the highly trained professional singing voice".

== Vocal application ==
The body parts that are associated with creating chiaroscuro are the vocal tract and larynx. Chiaroscuro is made in the voice through the mix of a ringing brighter sound, a lowered larynx, and a dark oropharyngeal resonance working in equilibrium. To produce the desired effect, one will have a slightly lowered and relaxed larynx, a raised soft palate, a released forward tongue, and correct breathing support/technique. In addition, coordination by the muscle in the vocal folds as it contracts creates the ability to sing in a chest voice (thyroarytenoid muscle), and the head voice (lengthening of the cricothyroid muscle) allows for the creation of the mixed voice.

== Examples ==
- Franco Corelli – "L'amour... Ah! leve-toi, soleil!" from Roméo et Juliette
- Franco Corelli – "Vesti la giubba" from Pagliacci
- Leontyne Price – "Chi il bel sogno di Doretta" from La rondine
- Dolora Zajick – "O don fatale" from Don Carlo
- Enrico Caruso – "Recondita armonia" from Tosca
- Maria Callas – "Casta diva" from Norma
