= Chicago Sketch Fest =

Sketch comedy festival in Chicago

The Chicago Sketch Comedy Festival, also known as Chicago SketchFest, is a sketch comedy festival in Chicago. Founded by Brian Posen, it began in 2002 with 33 groups. It later became one of the largest festivals of its kind; the 2014 edition included 150 troupes and more than 1,000 performers. The nineteenth annual edition was held at Stage 773 in the Lake View neighborhood in January 2020 and presented almost 120 shows over two weeks.

== History ==
Posen conceived the festival after a musical he had booked at the Theatre Building fell through. For the inaugural 2002 festival, organizers provided the participating groups with the venue, crew, and advertising without charge. Groups from Los Angeles, Seattle, Boston, and New York took part in 2003. In 2004, the festival expanded throughout the Theatre Building and introduced OctaSketch, in which directors and performers were given eight hours to create a show.

By 2007, Chicago SketchFest featured 100 groups and expected an audience of 10,000. The 2014 edition presented 150 troupes over eight nights at Stage 773, with performers coming from across the United States and from Dublin and Toronto. Organizers said the 2018 edition attracted more than 1,000 artists and 10,000 attendees; its program included 130 performances. The eighteenth edition in 2019 featured 120 shows over eight days, followed by the nineteenth edition from January 9 to 19, 2020.
