= Kyle Starks =

American comic book writer and artist

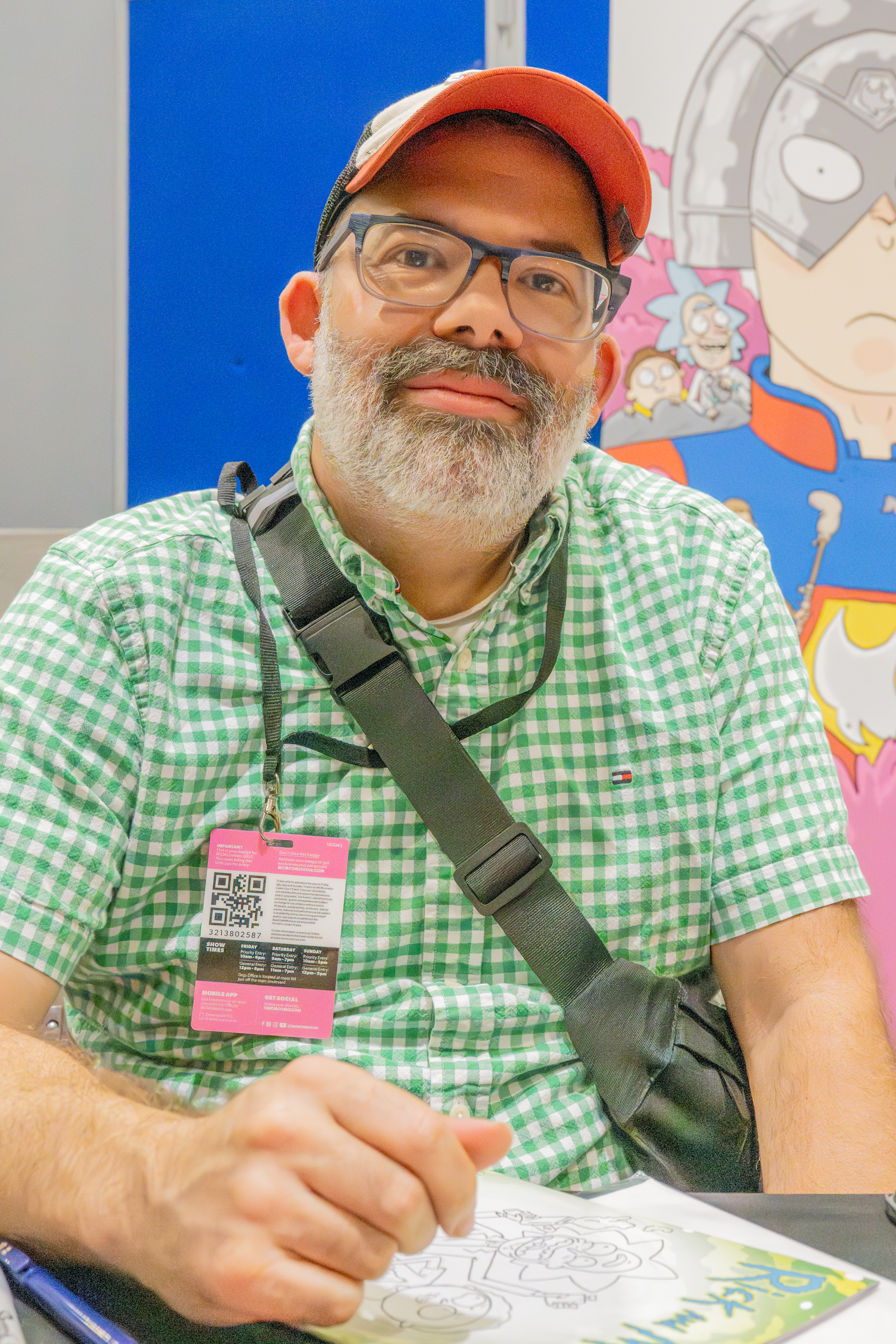
- At MCM Comic Con London, May 2025
- Born: Kyle Starks
- Areas: Writer, Artist
- Notable works: Sexcastle, Rick and Morty, Kill Them All, Assassin Nation, Rock Candy Mountain, Peacemaker Tries Hard!

Kyle Starks is an American comic book writer and artist who has been nominated for multiple Eisner Awards. He is best known for his work on the Rick and Morty comics from Oni Press, as well as his creator-owned comics Sexcastle, Kill Them All, and Assassin Nation.

== Career ==
Starks's first comic was the 2012 webcomic The Legend of Ricky Thunder, about a pro-wrestler who learns that wrestling is fake, which Starks ran a successful 2013 Kickstarter to put out a "director's cut" version. ComicsAlliance called the book "quite possibly the best wrestling comic book ever made." After that, he ran a Kickstarter in 2014 to fund his graphic novel Sexcastle, an homage to '80s action films, which was then published through Image Comics. It was nominated for the Eisner Award for Best Humor Publication in 2016 and was optioned for a movie by the Russo Brothers, although, as of 2025, nothing has gone forward with the film. In 2015, he wrote a story for the Marvel Comics one-shot Secret Wars Too, which resurrected the character of D-Man, a favorite character of Starks.

In 2016, he launched another Kickstarter for Kill Them All, an action-comedy which also was optioned to become a film. He wrote an issue of Oni Press's Invader Zim comic before becoming the new writer for their Rick and Morty series. He would end up writing 48 issues of Rick and Morty for Oni. In 2017, he would publish Rock Candy Mountain, about "the world's toughest hobo," through Image Comics, which was also nominated for Best Humor Publication at the 2018 Eisner Awards. He also wrote a Dead of Winter mini-series for Oni Press, based on the tabletop board game, and a Mars Attacks comic for Dynamite Entertainment.

In 2019, he published Assassin Nation with artist Erica Henderson through Image Comics, about a group of hitmen hired to protect the world's greatest assassin. In 2021, he and artist Chris Schweizer began publishing The Six Sidekicks of Trigger Keaton though Image, which Polygon named as one of the 10 "best comics of 2022." In 2022, he and artist Artyom Topilin published the ongoing horror comic I Hate This Place also through Image. The book's original title was Fuck This Place, which Image instead offered as an alternative title, marketing both "clean" and "explicit" covers to retailers. The book was nominated for Outstanding Comic Book in the 34th GLAAD Media Awards.

In 2023, he wrote Where Monsters Lie, about a gated community for slashers, for Dark Horse and Peacemaker Tries Hard! for DC Black Label. In May 2023, it was announced that he would be writing a four-issue mini-series for Marvel called Marvel Unleashed, about the various pets and animals of the Marvel Universe, which introduced D-Man's pet, D-Dog.

In 2024, he wrote the detective comic Pine and Merrimac for Boom! Studios and Karate Prom, an OGN through First Second Books. It was also announced that he would write a spin-off of Patton Oswalt and Jordan Blum's comic Minor Threats called From the World of Minor Threats: Barfly with artist Ryan Browne. He also wrote the one-shot Lobo Cancellation Special, which was touted by DC as "the scummiest comic book this side of Uranus." In September 2024, it was announced that he would write a four-issue horror comic Those Not Afraid for Dark Horse, about two serial killers who begin competing to see who can reach the state record for kills first.

== Personal life ==
Starks lives in Evansville, Indiana. He has stated that he got his interest in comics from his uncle, Tony Starks (not to be confused with Tony Stark), who sold Golden and Silver Age Comics and used to write for one of the price guides.

== Bibliography ==
=== Marvel Comics ===
- Avengers Unlimited Infinity Comic #26 (writer) (2022)
- Marvel Unleashed #1-4 (writer) (2023)
- Secret Wars Too #1, short story "Last Days of D-Man" (writer) (2015)
- Thanos: Death Notes #1, short story "The Bar at the End of the Line" (writer) (2022)
- Unbeatable Squirrel Girl #3, artist for Deadpool's Supervillain Card for Galactus (2015) and a page in vol. 2 #10 (2016)

=== DC Comics ===
- Batman: The Brave and the Bold vol. 2 #7-9, three-part "Wild Dog" story (writer) (2023–2024)
- End of Life (writer) current ongoing DC Vertigo title (2025-
- Harley Quinn: Black + White + Redder #4, short story "A Voice Traveling" (writer) (2023)
- Lobo Cancellation Special #1 (writer) (2024)
- Peacemaker Tries Hard! #1-6 (writer) (2023)
- Super-Pets Special: Bitedentity Crisis #1, short story "Who Woofs the Woofmen" (writer/artist) (2024)
- Titans: Beast World Tour Gotham #1, short story "Wild Thing" (writer) (2023)

=== Other Comics ===
==== Boom! Studios ====
- Pine and Merrimac #1-5 (writer) (2024)

==== Dynamite Entertainment ====
- Mars Attacks #1-5 (writer) (2019)

==== Dark Horse Comics ====
- Devil On My Shoulder #1-4 (writer) (2025)
- From the World of Minor Threats: BARFLY #1-4 (writer) (2024)
- Those Not Afraid #1-4 (writer) (2025)
- Where Monsters Lie #1-4 (writer) (2023)
- Where Monsters Lie: Cull-De-Sac #1-4 (writer) (2024–2025)
- Devil On My Shoulder #1-4 (writer) (2025–2026)

==== First Second Books ====
- Karate Prom OGN (writer/artist) (2024)

==== Image Comics ====
- Assassin Nation #1-5 (writer) (2019)
- Creepshow #4 (writer) (2022)
- I Hate This Place #1-10 (2022–2023)
- Old Head OGN (writer/artist) (2021)
- Rock Candy Mountain #1-8 (writer/artist) (2017)
- Sexcastle OGN (writer/artist) (2015)
- Six Sidekicks of Trigger Keaton #1-6 (writer) (2021)
- Wrestle Heist #1-5 (writer/artist) (2025)

==== Oni Press ====
- Dead of Winter #1-4 (writer) (2017)
- Invader Zim #7 (writer) (2016)
- Kill Them All OGN (writer/artist) (2017)
- Rick and Morty #16-28, 30–31, 34–52, 54-60 (writer), #20, 25, 28, 34, 47, 55 (writer/artist) (2016–2020)
