= Rick and Morty vs. Dungeons & Dragons =

American comic book series based on Rick and Morty and Dungeons & Dragons

- The limited edition cover of Rick and Morty vs. Dungeons and Dragons Deluxe Edition (2021) with cover art by Max Dunbar.

Publication information
- Publisher: IDW Publishing and Oni Press
- Schedule: Varied
Title(s)
Rick and Morty vs. Dungeons & Dragons #1–4
Rick and Morty vs. Dungeons & Dragons Chapter II: Painscape #1–4
Rick and Morty vs. Dungeons & Dragons: The Meeseeks Adventure
- Formats: Original material for the series has been published as a set of limited series and one-shot comics.
- Publication date: August 2018 – February 2022

Creative team
- Writer(s): Jim Zub; Patrick Rothfuss; Sarah Stern
- Penciller(s): Troy Little
- Colorist(s): Leonardo Ito

Rick and Morty vs. Dungeons & Dragons (also stylized as Rick and Morty vs. D&D) is a crossover American comic book series, published by IDW Publishing and Oni Press, based on the adult animated science fiction sitcom Rick and Morty and the tabletop role-playing game Dungeons & Dragons which follows the characters from the former series in the setting of the latter.

The series was written by Jim Zub, co-written by Patrick Rothfuss (volume 1) and Sarah Stern (volume 2), illustrated by Troy Little with colors by Leonardo Ito. In 2022, Rick and Morty vs. Dungeons and Dragons Deluxe Edition (2021) was nominated for the "Best Graphic Album—Reprint" Eisner Award.

== Publishing history ==
IDW Publishing and Oni Press jointly published the original limited series across fours issues from August 29, 2018 to January 30, 2019. In April 2019, they released a collected hardcover edition of the Rick and Morty vs. Dungeons & Dragons (2018) series, titled Rick and Morty + Dungeons & Dragons Comic Book and Campaign, which also included character sheets, extra art and the adventure module "The Temple Of Glorb". The module, designed by Adam Lee, is a 5th Edition Dungeons & Dragons adventure aimed at four to six Level 1 player characters. This edition came with different colored covers exclusive to various retailers. Then in November 2019, Wizards of the Coast released Dungeons & Dragons vs. Rick and Morty, a starter box set for 5th Edition Dungeons & Dragons, which included a themed adventure called "The Lost Dungeon Of Rickedness: Big Rick Energy".

A sequel four-issue limited series, titled Rick and Morty vs. Dungeons & Dragons Chapter II: Painscape, was released from September 18 to December 18, 2019. In August 2021, Rick and Morty vs. Dungeons and Dragons Deluxe Edition was released; this edition collected the first two limited series and included the new one-shot Rick and Morty vs. Dungeons & Dragons: The Meeseeks Adventure.

In February 2022, The Meeseeks Adventure one-shot was then released as a standalone issue.

== Comic books ==
=== Rick and Morty vs. Dungeons & Dragons (2018) ===
In 2018, publishers IDW Publishing and Oni Press presented a crossover between the adult animated media franchise Rick and Morty and Dungeons & Dragons. Set during the events of the second season of Rick and Morty, sometime after the events of "Meeseeks and Destroy", the four-issue crossover comic Rick and Morty vs. Dungeons & Dragons was co-written by Jim Zub and Patrick Rothfuss, with art by Troy Little, seeing publication from August 2018 to January 2019. A "director's cut" of the first issue was released in March 2019.

=== Rick and Morty vs. Dungeons & Dragons Chapter II: Painscape (2019) ===
A four-issue sequel mini-series, Rick and Morty vs. Dungeons & Dragons Chapter II: Painscape, was published from September to December 2019. It was written by Jim Zub and Sarah Stern with art by Troy Little.

=== Rick and Morty vs. Dungeons & Dragons: The Meeseeks Adventure (2021) ===
A one-shot titled Rick and Morty vs. Dungeons & Dragons: The Meeseeks Adventure was published in the Rick and Morty vs. Dungeons and Dragons Deluxe Edition collection in 2021, and was later republished as a standalone issue on February 8, 2022. It was written by Jim Zub and illustrated by Troy Little and Leonardo Ito.

== Related products ==
=== Dungeons & Dragons vs. Rick and Morty (2019) ===
On November 19, 2019, Wizards of the Coast released Dungeons & Dragons vs. Rick and Morty, a starter box set for 5th Edition Dungeons & Dragons designed by Kate Welch, Ryan Hartman, Adam Lee, and Ari Levitch, with Jim Zub. It included a rulebook, five pre-generated character sheets inspired by characters in the series, a specially designed DM screen, a set of dice and a Rick and Morty-themed adventure module, "The Lost Dungeon Of Rickedness: Big Rick Energy". The premise of the module is that it is written by the fictional character Rick Sanchez for the rest of the characters to play. The digital edition on D&D Beyond, Roll20, and Fantasy Grounds was delisted in October 2022 when Wizards of the Coast's licensing agreement with Adult Swim expired.

Jon Ryan, for IGN wrote "it's clear that the team behind this crossover is incredibly invested in striking a great balance between paying homage to and reverently adapting the source material while also making the adventure accessible to new players (after all, isn’t it likely that left to his own devices Rick would just constantly kill all the characters he found boring?). The adventure booklet, in particular, will be a fun read for any DMs who are fans of the series, as it doesn’t just feature commentary from 'Rick' over the standard rule text (as in the rulebook), but rather, almost every room description, stat block, and random table are written from his perspective".

=== Rick and Morty: Worlds Apart (2021) ===
A Dungeons & Dragons-themed episode of the Rick and Morty animated series, "Claw and Hoarder: Special Ricktim's Morty", aired as a part of its fourth season on Adult Swim on December 8, 2019, to which a stand-alone sequel miniseries, Worlds Apart, was published by Oni Press from February 3 to May 5, 2021.

== Reception ==
Brian Hibbs, in The Beat's analysis of 2019 comics sales, called Rick & Morty Vs. Dungeons & Dragons "a bit of a surprise hit" for IDW with "nearly 21k copies" sold. Then in 2020, the first volume was IDW's 9th best selling title with 9400 copies sold and the second volume was Oni's best selling title with 7400 copies sold. Rick and Morty vs. Dungeons and Dragons was 18th on the "NPD BookScan Top 20 'Superheroes' Graphic Novels – Full Year 2020". Rick and Morty vs. Dungeons and Dragons Deluxe Edition (2021) was nominated for the 2022 "Best Graphic Album—Reprint" Eisner Award.

Sergio Pereira, in a review of Rick and Morty vs. Dungeons and Dragons #1 for CBR, wrote that this issue "stands alone as intelligent social commentary on D&D culture" as it "touches upon two important feelings that most newbies encounter when trying to subscribe to the hobby: confusion and exclusion". He highlighted a "standout panel" where "Rick takes a subtle dig at D&D by revealing that no one sticks to their rolls if someone isn't watching. In doing so, he basically confirms to Morty that everyone pretends to know what's going on... but it's a whole lot of hogwash". Corey Plante of Inverse also commented on how the issue shows the "overwhelming experience" of starting Dungeons & Dragons and that "all of these carefully planted details genuinely capture the experience of playing Dungeons & Dragons, and that’s perhaps the best thing about this crossover". Plante opined that it is "one of the best Rick and Morty comics stories to date" and even with little science fiction, it "still manages to feel Rick and Morty-AF because the writers understand and appreciate the characters so well". In contrast, Joshua Davison of Bleeding Cool called the first issue "a severely underwhelming experience" as the slow paced issue "reads like a Rick and Morty-flavored advertisement for Dungeons & Dragons" and that it "has way too much dialogue for how little humor there actually is. Comedy is very subjective, but very few of the jokes land". On the issue's art, Davison wrote that "Troy Little and Leonardo Ito succeed in making this look like Rick and Morty though. The artwork looks just like the show and conveys motion well in this non-animated medium. The color palette is off-beat and strange just like the show as well".

Gavin Sheehan, in a review of Rick and Morty + Dungeons & Dragons Comic Book and Campaign for Bleeding Cool, wrote that "everything about their adventure through the realms both virtual and real become a twisted look at the various ways the game is played and the personalities who come to roll a few dice. There are parts of this book that are intrinsic to the fabric of D&D as a game and a culture. [...] Rothfuss and Zub manage to run the gambit through pretty much every geeky personality that plays the game, and much like the fellow characters you play at the table with, not all are complementary to what's going on. In fact, there's some heavy shades of darkness in these pages that took me back throughout the years to games I had played, people I played with, and scenarios I had experienced for better and worse".

Aaron Phillips, in a review of Rick and Morty vs. Dungeons & Dragons Chapter II: Painscape #1 for But Why Tho, called the issue "another brilliant collaboration" with Zub leaning "heavily into the lore of DnD adding real depth to the story" and that it "captures every ounce of essence from the show". On the issue's art, Phillips wrote that "both the story and art flows so fluidly that for me as a reader I felt the pages mirrored the animation" and felt that Little "excels" at "the background detail he weaves in. There are levels of details to enjoy for all types of fans, from the casual to the obsessive. Ito's contribution with the colors pairs very well with Little's illustrations. [...] Ito's work is so good within this issue, and prior series of Rick And Morty, that he could have easily had walked off of the Adult Swim team to color this series".

Chase Magnett rated The Meeseeks Adventure #1 a 1.5/5 in his review for ComicBook.com. Magnett commented that "while there's still plenty of humor to be found in both Rick and Morty and Dungeons & Dragons, this story of a Meeseeks Box appearing in a generic D&D setting with generic D&D characters is incapable of funding any of it. [...] Even as a fan of both franchises, it's difficult to find any joy in this, although it's depicted competently enough and that might be worth something – just not much".

== Collected editions ==
Title	Material collected	Format	Publication date	ISBN
Rick and Morty vs. Dungeons & Dragons	Rick and Morty vs. Dungeons & Dragons #1–4	Trade paperback	March 2019	ISBN 978-1-68405-416-9
Rick and Morty + Dungeons & Dragons Comic Book and Campaign	Rick and Morty vs. Dungeons & Dragons #1–4, "The Temple Of Glorb"	Hardcover	April 2019	—N/a
Rick and Morty vs. Dungeons & Dragons: Chapter II: Painscape	Rick and Morty vs. Dungeons & Dragons: Chapter II: Painscape #1–4	Trade paperback	March 2020	ISBN 978-1620106907
Rick and Morty vs. Dungeons & Dragons: Deluxe Edition	Rick and Morty vs. Dungeons & Dragons #1–4, Rick and Morty vs. Dungeons & Dragons: Chapter II: Painscape #1–4, Rick and Morty vs. Dungeons & Dragons: The Meeseeks Adventure	Hardcover	September 2021	ISBN 978-1-62010-875-8
Rick and Morty vs. Dungeons & Dragons: The Complete Adventures	Rick and Morty vs. Dungeons & Dragons #1–4, Rick and Morty vs. Dungeons & Dragons: Chapter II: Painscape #1–4, Rick and Morty vs. Dungeons & Dragons: The Meeseeks Adventure	Trade paperback	October 2022	ISBN 9781684056491
