= Rick and Morty: The Manga =

Manga by Alissa Sallah and JeyOdin

Rick and Morty: The Manga ― Get in the Robot, Morty! is an ongoing comic series written by Alissa Sallah and drawn by JeyOdin. The story, a parody of Neon Genesis Evangelion and Attack on Titan, revolves around Morty as he faces off against an army of Jiants (giant variants of his father Jerry) in a robot built by Rick, while struggling with high school.

== Summary ==
Set in its own continuity, the manga follows Rick as he builds a giant robot for Morty to use to face off against an unexpected enemy: a horde of giant variants of Jerry dubbed "Jiants". As Rick becomes invested in upgrading the mech with new features, Morty, his sister Summer, and his new friend Rowan continue to attend high school while navigating the post-apocalyptic world around them.

== Reception ==
Upon the release of the first volume of this manga-inspired series of comics, it has been positively received by critics.
