= Rick and Morty: Corporate Assets =

Comic mini-series by James Asmus

Rick and Morty: Corporate Assets is a four-issue mini-series comic written by James Asmus. The story revolves around the dynamic duo's attempt to take down the corporate machine responsible for irreversibly altering the art of game development from the production of meaningful, creative works into endlessly producing soulless cookie-cut cash cows, riddled with microtransactions and privacy violations.

== Summary ==
The comic follows Rick as he attempts to save Morty from the clutches of corporate evil. The story kicks off as Morty blindly agrees to the terms of service on the latest hit mobile app - effectively signing his life away. He is later abducted by the corporate creators of the app for their nefarious purposes. Rick must come up with some crazy invention to save his most loyal companion from the clutches of corporate society. However, things take an unexpected turn when Morty unknowingly allows the company to steal Rick's interdimensional portal gun, stranding the duo in alternate dimension while the greedy corporate drones steal all of Rick's inventions and use them for evil.

== Reception ==
Rick and Morty: Corporate Assets received good reviews.
