= Rick and Morty: Rick's New Hat =

Novel written by Alex Firer

Rick and Morty: Rick's New Hat is a five-issue mini-series comic written by Alex Firer. The story revolves around Rick being infected by the "greatest hat in all the multiverse", facing off against cults, dark gods, and being forced to return to the Cronenberged Prime Dimension for refuge, drawing the ire of the original PB, Mr. Goldenfold, and Beth Prime.

== Summary ==
The comic follows Rick as he is trapped with an all-powerful intellect-blocking hat he cannot remove, drawing attention across the multiverse from the Council of Dunces, the dark god Nunzumel the Think-Giver, and being forced with Morty to return to the Cronenberged Prime Dimension (erroneously referred to as "World C-137") in search of a solution, drawing the ire of a revenge-seeking PB and his species, as well as the now-cyborg Goldenfold Prime (Platinumfold) and still-alive Beth Prime (BattleBeth), feuding over the remains of the planet, the duo's adventure bringing them across various afterlives.

== Reception ==
The series was advertised as 2021's top comic event. Upon release, it has received a generally positive critical reception.
