= Rick and Morty vs. Cthulhu =

Novel written by Jim Zub

Rick and Morty vs. Cthulhu is a four-issue mini-series comic written by Jim Zub and released in 2022-2023. The story revolves around the Smith family as they traverse a hellscape populated by the works of H. P. Lovecraft to track down and defeat Cthulhu.

== Summary ==
The comic follows Rick as he attempts to save Morty from the clutches of the forces of Cthulhu. As Rick is trapped in a cycle of reincarnation, Morty bonds with Cthulhu's daughter Cathy, and Summer faces off against the Cats of Ulthar.
