= Chiaroscuro (IDW Publishing) =

Comic series developed by Troy Little

Publication information
- Publisher: Meanwhile Studios; IDW Publishing (collected volume)
- Format: Ongoing series
- Publication date: 2001–2003 (1–7); 2004–2005 (8–10)
- No. of issues: 10

Creative team
- Written by: Troy Little
- Artist: Troy Little

Collected editions
- Chiaroscuro: ISBN 978-1-60010-119-9

Chiaroscuro is a comic series developed by Canadian artist Troy Little between 2000 and 2005.

== Publication history ==
Little began self-publishing in 2001 and after releasing two issue he received a Xeric in 2001 which allowed him to produce another five issues. Personal circumstances slowed progress until he was given a second grant from the P.E.I. Council of the Arts in 2005 which allowed him to finish and release the last three issue. In 2007 the series was collected into a single volume by IDW Publishing. In July 2008 IDW also gave out a free preview comic featuring Chiaroscuro and Little's next project Angora Napkin.

== Plot ==
The story is about an unemployed artist named Steven Patch, who leads a depressing life of drinking and complaining about his life. He eventually runs into a situation of mistaken identity, which sends him into a spiraling series of life-altering decisions.

== Reception ==
It has been praised by independent comics legend Dave Sim.

== Collected editions ==
It has been collected into a single volume:

- Chiaroscuro (234 pages, B&W hardcover, IDW Publishing, 2007, ISBN 978-1-60010-119-9)
