= Chiaroscuro (2000 AD) =

Chiaroscuro was a horror series which appeared in the British weekly comic 2000 AD. It was written by Simon Spurrier with art by Cam Smith (also known as Smudge).

== Characters ==
- Anthony Elvy is a film journalist and the son of a once famous film director. He is sick of the fake sincerity that surrounds the film industry.
- Samuel Erin is a seventy-year-old film director who is full of self-pity. He hands Elvy a film reel before he is killed in an accident.

== Plot ==
London 2006. Anthony Elvy heads to Elstree Film and Television Studios to do an on set interview with a film director by the name of Samuel Erin. During the interview, it is discovered that Erin is full of self-pity. At the end of the interview, he hands Elvy a film reel telling him it will be what he is best known for. Elvy decides to head home early to watch the reel. Elvy discovers, to his horror, that its actually a Mondo film showing US troops executing Cubans during Operation Urgent Fury in Grenada, 1983. He phones Erin for another interview but he is lying dead, impaled on a prop set and surrounded by fire.

== See also ==
- Flicker
- Faces of Death
