= Rick + Morty in the Eternal Nightmare Machine =

- Promotional poster
- Directed by: Paul Robertson
- Written by: Paul Robertson
- Based on: Rick and Morty by: Justin Roiland; Dan Harmon
- Produced by: Paul Robertson
- Edited by: Paul Robertson
- Music by: Brent Busby
- Production company: Paul Robertson
- Distributed by: Adult Swim; YouTube
- Release date: April 30, 2021
- Running time: 17 minutes
- Country: United States
- Language: English

Rick + Morty in the Eternal Nightmare Machine (also stylised Rick and Morty in the Eternal Nightmare Machine, or simply Eternal Nightmare Machine) is an American pixel-animated short film based on the television series/franchise Rick and Morty, produced by Adult Swim and debuting on both the network and their YouTube channel on April 30, 2021, alongside a marathon of the series' fourth season, to promote its then-upcoming fifth season. Written, directed, and animated (in the style of a 16-bit video game) by Paul Robertson, the film received positive reviews from critics.

== Plot ==
"I am the God of this Infinite Hell. The Nightmare Machine cannot die. You will now become as Void."

— The simulated President Morty Smith.

Finding themselves trapped inside another (collapsing) simulation (as in "M. Night Shaym-Aliens!") which they are informed is corrupt, Rick and Morty fight their way out of the Pyramid Sector, killing simulated versions of Noob Noob and a Glootie-controlled toilet, before taking on demonic visages of Scary Terry and Tammy Gueterman in the Horror Zone, acquiring the former's glove and impaling the latter after weakening her via a toxic vat of acid.

Proceeding onto the Interdimensional Cable "Cop City", Rick and Morty fight their way through a fruit police army with the help of Birdperson and Mr. Meeseeks, defeating a parasite and robotic snake-empowered Li'l Bits, before Morty is kidnapped by a giant simulated sentient version of the Gwendolyn sex robot. After fighting off several enlarged Ghost in a Jar parasites in pursuit of Morty into the Heaven Layer, Rick engages in one-on-one combat with Gazorpazorpfield, gaining his respect before continuing on in search of Morty, armed with a weaponised Plumbus. Discovering Morty trapped by an amalgamated composite of his various love interests: the Gwendolyn robot merged with mutated versions of Jessica, Tricia Lange, and Morty's Girlfriend (from "The Vat of Acid Episode"), Rick engages them (and further simulated offspring of Morty's created by Gwendolyn) in combat, freeing Morty. After freeing Morty, Rick and he proceed deeper into the simulation to the Online World, taking out the Beta 7 hive mind with Belle Delphine's GamerGirl Bath Water before taking out numerous enlarged representations of Phoenixperson, a Wasp Rick and Ants-in-My-Eyes Johnson-wielding Beekeeper Jerry, and Rick's experiments, using enlarged Pickle Ricks against them, before finally finding themselves before President Morty Smith of The Citadel; sitting on his throne surrounded by The Matrix-inspired monitors of his visage, and declaring himself "God of this Infinite Hell", he warns the duo that the Nightmare Machine cannot die, and they will now become as Void, before vanishing on being punched in the face by Morty.

Equipping their anime armour from "Promortyus", Rick and Morty take on the subsequently-appearing giant robotic floating head of the former President Morty's "Eyepatch Morty-as-Evil Rick" visage from "Close Rick-counters of the Rick Kind", destroying the outer Rick shell to display its eyepatched inner layer. On the cusp of defeat, the pair summon Snuffles, the Ricklets, and Ice-T as a distraction, before Morty stabs the monstrosity through the eye, destroying it. Descending through the eye to "The Core" of the simulation, Rick and Morty prepare to face a giant time police officer, only for him to be weakened by a returning Gazorpazorpfield to allow Rick (with assist from Unity) to kill him, and Morty to then hack the malfunctioning core to destroy it, inadvertently freeing the gigantic Toxic Morty at its core, who incapacitates Rick and Morty with a mouth laser blast.

Having also been trapped in the simulation, Space Beth retrieves the unconscious Rick and Morty in her ship, and one-shots the steadily-eye-increasing Toxic Morty with her laser cannon, freeing an angelic deity from its core whom Space Beth then impales with a knife, causing the simulation (and its universe) to Reboot. As the simulation reboots, images of the Tree of Life, Michelangelo's The Creation of Adam, and Akira are glimpsed, before returning the status quo to the Smith family eating breakfast at home, and ceding with a final glitch into a promotion for "Mort Dinner Rick Andre", the fifth season premiere of Rick and Morty.

== Release ==
Rick + Morty in the Eternal Nightmare Machine was released on Adult Swim Day on April 30, 2021, airing alongside a ten-episode television marathon of the fourth season of Rick and Morty. On April 20, the first promotional poster had been revealed, designed by Paul Robertson, who would animate the television special, and who had previously produced numerous Rick and Morty-themed advertisements for the network. Another poster was later released to Roberton's Twitter page, with both posters portraying numerous Rick and Morty characters in pixel art form.

== Cast ==
- Justin Roiland as Rick Sanchez, Morty Smith, and President Morty
  - Roiland also voiced Mr. Meeseeks, Mr. Poopybutthole, and Noob Noob
- Sarah Chalke as Beth Smith and Space Beth
- Chris Parnell as Jerry Smith
- Spencer Grammer as Summer Smith
- Jess Harnell as Scary Terry
- Kari Wahlgren as Jessica
- Cassie Steele as Tammy Gueterman and Tricia Lange
- Dan Harmon as Birdperson / Phoenixperson
- Rob Paulsen as Snuffles / Snowball
- Tom Kenny as Million Ants
- Taika Waititi as Glootie
- Belle Delphine as Herself / Bath Water Gamer Girl

== Music ==
Uploading the seven-part soundtrack (not including credits music) he composed for the short film to his personal YouTube channel, Brent Busby elaborated his used of Nuendo, Superior Drummer, EZbass, Kontakt and Rapid Synth in composing so, playing the guitar parts through a Strymon Iridium.

== Reception ==
Bubbleblabber praised the film's poster as "indicative of Paul [Robertson]’s pathos when it comes to what he ultimately delivers", ahead of its release. On the film's release, Bleeding Cool lauded it as "something enjoyable to pass out to" following the scheduled marathon of Rick and Morty's fourth season, stating that "one thing everyone could agree on [was that] artist/animator Paul Robertson (@probzz) blew viewers' minds. Syfy Wire praised Rick and Morty in the Eternal Nightmare Machine for "giv[ing] fans a glimpse into what a Rick and Morty side-scrolling game would have looked like had they been around in the arcade heyday", further complimenting it presentation as a "quick introduction into the crazy world" for new fans and Easter eggs hidden throughout for "hardcore fans". Uproxx meanwhile criticised the film as essentially "an actual episode" of Rick and Morty, calling it "a lot of Rick and Morty at once, honestly", but praising it as "another way to get fans more excited" ahead of the fifth season premiere of the television series: "Mort Dinner Rick Andre".

Escapist Magazine complimented the "not(?)-video game" status of Rick + Morty in the Eternal Nightmare Machine as a "piece of pixel art", praising its video game tributes and calling for "a full-fledged, non-VR Rick and Morty video game" based on the film to be funded by Adult Swim. Citing the "iron-clad attention spans" one would need to properly watch the film, Okayplayer lauded the film as a "beautifully animated (and criminally unplayable) Mega Man" tribute, further complimenting Robertson's heavy use of Easter eggs throughout the film. Decider praised the film as "just as much fun" as the title implies, stating that one would "start wishing this was a real video game" on watching it.
