= Rick and Morty: The Anime =

2024 anime television series

- Genre: Action; Action-adventure; Adult animation; Adventure; Animated sitcom; Comedy drama; Dark comedy; Science fiction
- Created by: Takashi Sano
- Based on: Rick and Morty by Justin Roiland and Dan Harmon
- Written by: Takashi Sano
- Directed by: Takashi Sano
- Voices of: Japanese: Yōhei Tadano; Keisuke Chiba; Hitomi Sasaki; Manabu Muraji; Akiha Matsui; Takako Fuji; Toshinari Fukamachi; English: Joe Daniels; Gabriel Regojo; Luci Christian; Donna Bella Litton; Patricia Duran; Ty Mahany
- Opening theme: "Love is Entropy" by Code of Zero featuring Cameron Earnshaw
- Ending theme: "The Other Side" by Ayuko Saito
- Composer: Tetsuya Takahashi
- Countries of origin: Japan; United States
- Original languages: Japanese; English (Note: Sentai Studios was commissioned to produce the English dub and sub.)
- No. of seasons: 1
- No. of episodes: 10 (+ 5 shorts)

Production
- Executive producers: Jason DeMarco; Joseph Chou; Maki Terashima-Furuta (Note: Short films only)
- Producers: Maki Nagano; Max Nishi; Takenari Maeda
- Editor: Yoshihiro Kasahara
- Running time: 5–15 minutes (shorts); 17–26 minutes (series)
- Production companies: Sola Entertainment; Telecom Animation Film; Studio Deen (Note: Short films Samurai & Shogun Part 1 and Part 2 only); Williams Street

Original release
- Network: Adult Swim
- Release: March 29, 2020 – November 12, 2021 (shorts)
- Release: August 16 – October 18, 2024 (series)

Related
- Rick and Morty (franchise)

Rick and Morty: The Anime is an adult animated science fiction sitcom television series created, written and directed by Takashi Sano, produced by Sola Entertainment and animated by Telecom Animation Film for Cartoon Network's nighttime programming block Adult Swim. The third series in the franchise, based on the American animated series of the same name by Justin Roiland and Dan Harmon, set between the fifth and sixth seasons of the main series, it stars Yōhei Tadano as Rick Sanchez and Keisuke Chiba as Morty Smith, reprising their roles from the Japanese dub of the original series. None of the cast of the English version of the original series reprise their roles for its English dub.

Following five short films that premiered on Adult Swim and subsequently released onto its official YouTube account from March 29, 2020, to November 12, 2021, the series itself aired on the network from August 16 to October 18, 2024. Both the shorts and series received mixed reviews from critics, with the former getting somewhat more favorable reactions.

== Plot ==
Rick and Morty: The Anime revolves around the adventures of the Smith family, in particular mad scientist Rick Sanchez, and his grandchildren, the 14-year-old Morty Smith and the 17-year-old Summer Smith, whose parents, Jerry and Beth Smith (Rick's daughter), disapprove of their adventures. As Morty meets "time warrior" Elle, parallel storylines set sometime during the events of the sixth season of the main series explore the final months of the lives of the alternate reality spacefaring hero "Space Morty", and Morty's original father Jerry Prime.

Different versions of the characters (including the bespectacled genocider, President Morty Smith) inhabit other dimensions throughout the show's multiverse, with their personal characteristics varying from one reality to another.

== Cast ==
=== Main ===
Character	Voiced by	
Character	Japanese	English
Rick Sanchez / Mullet Rick	Yōhei Tadano	Joe Daniels
Morty Smith / President Morty / Space Morty	Keisuke Chiba	Gabriel Regojo
Elle	Hitomi Sasaki	Luci Christian
Jerry Smith / Jerry Prime	Manabu Muraji	Joe Daniels
Summer Smith	Akiha Matsui	Donna Bella Litton
Beth Smith / Space Beth	Takako Fuji	Patricia Duran
Frank	Toshinari Fukamachi	Ty Mahany

=== Guest ===
- Manabu Muraji (Japanese) as AI Driver and Hologram Transvestite
- Yuki Minami (Japanese) as Hologram Girl
- Hinata Tadokoro, Daiki Kobayashi, Hodaka Mieno, Nanami Yamashita, and Kazuya Saji (Japanese) as Future Beings
- Misa Ishii (Japanese) as Jessica
- Arisa Sakuraba (Japanese) as Cyborg Tammy Gueterman / Phoenixwoman
- Masashi Hashimoto (Japanese); Andrew Love (English) as Birdperson, a freedom fighter and Rick's best friend
- Fuminori Komatsu (Japanese); Shawn Hamilton (English) as Andre Curtis / The President, the U.S. president
- Fuminori Komatsu (Japanese); Brandon Hearnsberger (English) as Mr. Nimbus, Rick's nemesis
- Natsumi Wakasa (Japanese) as Birddaughter, Birdperson's and Tammy's child
- Takeshi Hayakawa (Japanese); Shawn Hamilton (English) as Mr. Goldenfold, Morty's teacher
- Kaori Nakamura (Japanese); Annie Mai (English) as Dr. Ellen Wong
- Takeshi Hayakawa (Japanese); Andrew Love (English) as Story Lord
- Saki Kobari (Japanese); Brittney Karbowski (English) as Maria Smith, Morty's and Elle's daughter

== Episodes ==
Season	Episodes	Originally released	
Season	Episodes	First released	Last released
Shorts	5	March 29, 2020	November 12, 2021
1	10	August 16, 2024	October 18, 2024

=== Short films (2020–21) ===
No.	Title	Directed by	Written by	Original release date
1	"Samurai & Shogun" "Samurai & Shogun Part 1"	Kaichi Sato	Kaichi Sato	March 29, 2020
In feudal Japan, Rick WTM-72 is a lone samurai protecting the Shogun Morty. After a tranquil moment together, they are ambushed by a group of Ninja Ricks who demand the surrender of Morty. Rick WTM-72 refuses, leading to a brutal, blood-soaked battle, where Rick WTM-72 defeats wave after wave of enemies, using both traditional samurai weapons and advanced technology hidden within his body. The battle intensifies as the Ninja Ricks call in reinforcements, but Rick WTM-72 continues to fight, even when heavily outnumbered, before continuing on his journey.
2	"Rick and Morty vs. Genocider"	Takashi Sano	Takashi Sano	July 26, 2020
After the disappearance of his own Rick, a Morty is tasked by the Council of the Citadel, overseen by President Morty, to travel to Japan and stop "The Genocider" from attacking Ricks and Mortys. After arriving in Japan, Morty activates an inflatable beeper given to him by his Rick. This leads him to an old apartment in Tokyo. There, he meets Rick C-137, who instructs Morty to drink a potion that will make him Urashima Tarō (subtitled as Rip Van Winkle). After trapping Morty in a bubble and bidding him farewell, laughingly addressing him as "Rick Sanchez", Rick is pulled into the sky towards the ship of the Genocider, and then surrounded by various Ricks. Laughing at them, Rick activates several anime boosted power-ups, becoming "Super Rick". During the ensuing battle, he sets off an explosion which destroys the ship, the city, and Rick himself. It later turns out that President Morty was controlling the Genocider with a similar device to the one he uses to control "Evil Rick" in "Close Rick-counters of the Rick Kind". After being informed that Rick C-137 dies in the explosion, President Morty asks his subordinates to erect memorials for the fallen Ricks and secretly destroys the device. The Morty trapped in the bubble, consumes the potion—consisting of Rick's memories and the excretions of the alien parasites from "Total Rickall"— and transforms into Rick C-137, the potion having allowed Rick to take over his body. In his answering machine, Rick discovers a voicemail from Jerry several years prior informing him of Morty's birth and asking him to visit his daughter.
3	"Summer Meets God (Rick Meets Evil)"	Takashi Sano	Takashi Sano	August 2, 2021
Summer begins dating Delta, a godlike A.I. she speaks with through her smartphone. Meanwhile, after a meeting with Dr. Wong, Jerry is taken as a host of a Gotron (which Delta is the operating system for) by a collection of Future Beings, leading to their world being reduced to an apocalyptic state, which Summer plans to rule with Delta as "RickWorld".
4	"The Great Yokai Battle of Akihabara"	Masaru Matsumoto	Naohiro Fukushima	October 10, 2021
Rick and Morty travel to Akihabara, Tokyo's famous electronics district, searching for an old rare screw to fix a toaster. As Morty immediately leaves for a maid café, Rick frees his former partner Yamada Q-saka from their lab he locked him in 30 years earlier, and he unleashes a group of yokai, supernatural creatures from Japanese folklore, upon the city. The yokai attack, and Rick brings Morty into a giant robot to fight them, leading to a frantic battle through the streets of Akihabara. After recovering his screw, Rick quickly disposes of the yokai before leaving the city in ruins to fix his toaster.
5	"Samurai & Shogun Part 2"	Kaichi Sato	Kaichi Sato	November 12, 2021
The sequel picks up where the first "Samurai & Shogun" short left off. Rick WTM-72 and the Shogun Morty he is charged with protecting continue their journey through a war-torn landscape, but their peace is short-lived as they are ambushed by a group of Glorzo-wearing Ninja Ricks and a single Kunoichi Summer, whose Rick that Rick WTM-72 had killed.

=== Season 1 (2024) ===
No.	Title	Directed by	Written by	Original release date
1	"Girl Who Manipulates Time"	Takashi Sano	Takashi Sano	August 16, 2024
One Galactic Federation warship is about to destroy a planet giving up all means of armed confrontation, but it is interrupted as Summer hacks into their spaceship systems. The story jumps to a time point which a Galactic Federation fleet abducts Rick from one version of the Smith family. This Rick turns out to be a dummy, and the real Rick is at somewhere else tracking down his enemy along with Space Beth, while holding an entropy device that can reverse time. Meanwhile, Morty is using a virtual reality device given by Rick, and enters into a simulation of multiple universes all at once. He either encounters a time warrior girl named Elle, a man named Frank or Mullet Rick who lost his Morty, leading to very diverse life experiences. Summer soon terminates Morty's simulation according to Rick's instruction, while Morty is in a scene reuniting with Elle. Post-credits scene: Cronenberg versions of Morty and Elle recreate the reunion scene, before they are both hunted down by Jerry Prime (Note: Between the events of "Rickmurai Jack" and "Solaricks") as dinner.
2	"Fighting Mother"	Takashi Sano	Takashi Sano	August 23, 2024
Rick gets into a temporal paradox during his return trip, and eventually leaps to a universe where Morty is still a baby. He encounters Mullet Rick, who recognises Rick as the one who stole the entropy device and Smith family from him before. Rick chases and fights Mullet Rick, because he suspects the latter invented the device to bring in Beth's miserable life, yet Mullet Rick only admits he used it to reset universes. The inter-dimensional contact leads to their constant shift in space fissure without portals, and a growing energy core attracting invasion from other dimensions. All is resolved when Rick is convinced that Mullet Rick would stay away from further troubles. Meanwhile, Space Beth successfully intrudes the capital ship of the Galactic Federation fleet, but it is in fact a set up by Tammy, who is resurrected with cyborg parts like Phoenixperson. The two have a tough fight, before the dummy Rick activates self-destruct and rebels recruited by Space Beth attack the fleet. Space Beth spares Tammy considering she has a family to catch up with, and successfully escapes. Post-credits scene: Tammy returns home after her duty, and she finds Birdperson and Birddaughter are waiting at the snowy street.
3	"Alien Elle"	Takashi Sano	Takashi Sano	August 30, 2024
Morty goes back to the virtual reality simulation in search of Elle, but only finds the Mullet Rick he encountered before. Mullet Rick explains that Elle is the lone survivor from a species capable of perceiving all conceivable future branches. He knows this because in his native universe, his grandson Space Morty teamed up with Alien Elle, to prevent the Galactic Federation from capturing Mullet Rick and invading planet Yalahreyta. Space Morty became the planet hero and rebel leader after fighting down a warship. He trusted Alien Elle for bringing him the best life, and she promised to defend him from whatever crisis. Mullet Rick concludes that Morty normally should not have any chance to meet Elle, but what the Ricks did to time and dimensions brings changes that Alien Elle could observe, which she comments as a regret from future decides the past. Mullet Rick then leaves without a trace, and Morty's simulation is once again terminated as Summer wants his help to rescue Rick proactively. Post-credits scene: Rick persuades Mullet Rick not to abandon the Smith Family he stayed with before leaving. Mullet Rick laments on how he affects Morty's life, and makes a decision.
4	"Memories"	Takashi Sano	Takashi Sano	September 6, 2024
A flashback reveals Mullet Rick was the creator of Defiance, the rebel group against the Galactic Federation, which was joined by Space Morty after Mullet Rick gave up his authority. As Space Morty continues to fight along with Alien Elle, Mullet Rick becomes bored. In the present, after leaving Mullet Rick's universe, Rick finds himself stranded in the paradox space by living as other Ricks. In the end, he realises Elle is the one behind the scenes, who wants Rick to validate her existence in this dimension. Summer and Morty, as picked up by Space Beth, soon locate Rick being out from the paradox space. Morty recognises Elle is driving Rick's spaceship, while Space Beth thinks she has encountered Elle before. Meanwhile, Beth gets insecure about being left behind by Rick again, and Jerry stubbornly plays with Rick's properties. Post-credits scene: Beth welcomes the family members and Elle back home, and they have a memorable family photoshoot. They all forget Jerry, who activates a gadget and goes lost in the garage.
5	"Family"	Masahiko Yoda	Takashi Sano	September 13, 2024
Rick realises Jerry's disappearance with a sword in the garage. Same is happened to Jerry Prime, and they are indeed transferred to the anti-verse of Rick's dimension. They encounter Mr. Nimbus, who explains the sword seals the dark energy and fighting spirit of the planet inhabitants at the beginning of the series. Someday in the past, the sword was put to a Japan Yakuza group in the anti-verse by Rick, which then split into two factions. Jerry showed up one day and retrieved the sword from the renegades, ending the faction war. He could do this because he once let Rick train up his hero persona to overcome his inability. Rick wiped off his memories after the sword was taken back home. Back to present, Jerry Prime decides to leave his sword to Jerry, which carries the sealed memories and revives the hero persona. When the Smith family and Elle travels to the anti-verse, they join Jerry to fight off the renegades seeking revenge. The fight ends when the Yakuza leader couple shows up, who are impressed by the strength of the Smith family. Post-credits scene: Returning to the original universe, Rick wipes out all memories for the group, while Jerry Prime continues his adventure in Cronenberg dimension.
6	"Free Will"	Takashi Sano	Takashi Sano	September 20, 2024
In the past, when Tammy just got recruited by the Galactic Federation, Elle was already a top agent. Later, once Space Beth, as part of Defiance, tried to rescue Birdperson from the Federation in a space western town, she was double-crossed by her teammates and confronted Elle. Elle recognised Space Beth as Morty's Mom, and assisted her escape before they parted ways. Space Beth then knew the species of Elle was wiped out when they did not use their foreknowledge to fight against the Federation. In the present, Elle goes to school with Morty and lives with the Smith Family, who becomes popular among everyone. Rick calls for a private talk as he confirms Elle is born as the anti-matter from the entropy device. Elle also confirms the device is responsible for time distortion, which is the true reason for Rick's paradoxical experience. Elle persuades Rick to keep the device and her for saving Space Beth and Birdperson previously, but refuses to share the future she experiences concurrently with the past and the present, in the faith of free will. Post-credits scene: Rick sought revenge for the betrayal towards Space Beth, while Tammy started her mission as the undercover agent in the past.
7	"When We Meet in Our Dreams"	Takashi Sano	Takashi Sano	September 27, 2024
In Mullet Rick's universe, Space Beth failed to rescue Birdperson and got captured in the Galactic Federation Prison. Mullet Rick, followed by Space Morty and Alien Elle, came to help and free all prisoners, but found the Federation had set up a killing explosion. Mullet Rick soon transferred all people through portals linked to the escape ship of the Federation, causing Space Morty to get shot to death when he neglected the danger upon arrival. As Mullet Rick went desperate about what to do next, Alien Elle suggested him to complete the CP transformation researched to invert time through an anti-matter, which she was willing to be. Mullet Rick reluctantly agreed, though he realised the same was performed for indefinite attempts. Alien Elle always became the matter in the entropy device, and Mullet Rick always activated the device to reset the universe. These happened until the accidental mesh with Rick's dimension shown in previous episodes, causing Mullet Rick to leave the device in Rick's dimension, at the Smith family garage before Rick first arrives. Post-credits scene: Back to the present, the Galactic Federation fleet regroup for a new attempt to capture Rick, Space Beth and Elle from Earth.
8	"Feel, Don't Think"	Takashi Sano	Takashi Sano	October 4, 2024
The Smith family prepares for the battle with the Galactic Federation, as Jerry brings a giant fighting robot from far space for Summer's control, Beth gears up with guns, and Space Beth and Elle plans on an ambush after a fake surrender. Rick tells Morty that he put portal fluid in the virtual reality device and causes the collision with Mullet Rick's dimension and other realities. Knowing Elle and the whole world may no longer exist if the entropy device is tempered by the Federation, Morty gets worried. Rick decides to find Mullet Rick with Morty on how to resolve the dilemma, after giving Jerry back his hero persona to fight. Mullet Rick explains he had clearer memories of previous universes after each reboot, and suspected even the mesh with Rick's universe was within Elle's whole set up. He considers the success of Elle moving into Rick and Morty's dimension changed the device function, which would now fully destroy Mullet Rick's universe if used. Morty is given the choice on whether they should do so. Post-credits scene: After Rick arrives to the Smith family, he examines the entropy device and the question note about universe significance left by Mullet Rick, before keeping them for the future.
9	"Her Innermost Wish"	Takashi Sano	Takashi Sano	October 11, 2024
Adding to universe destruction, the Ricks consider either annihilation of the entropy device matter or Elle would also be the solution of the inter-dimensional dilemma, but Morty could not accept any. Soon he is approached by Defiance members, speaking of how the spirit of Space Morty lives in everyone's hearts after his death in this dimension, but this further traumatizes Morty for not being the one deserving Elle's love. Returning to their original dimension, the Smith family, Elle and the Defiance led by Space Beth successfully defeat most of the Galactic Federation army, but the General activates cyborg fusion on himself as last attempt to capture the entropy device. Elle asks Rick to give it up, and uses the giant robot to launch the General back to space in overheat state. She sacrifices herself with an anti-matter explosion, leaving the useless device to a bitterly crying Morty. Post-credits scene: The General survives and fuses with the moon to approach earth, but the Birdperson family trio ends the crisis for good.
10	"A Pain in the Back"	Takashi Sano	Takashi Sano	October 18, 2024
While the Smith family are clearing off the remaining mess, Morty reluctantly goes into a new reality simulation which Rick describes as his best possible life. In this life, Morty and Elle first meet in school and become a lovely couple with a daughter named Maria. He also reunites with Frank, which they were once in an intriguing relationship. Frank wants to repay Morty, but tries too hard to make Morty feel inferior and abandon his family with jealousy. After years of struggle, Morty faces his mistakes and recognises Frank as part of his family, right before his death. Elle, Frank and Maria are thankful of Morty bringing their life together. The simulation device turns out to become defective, and makes Morty go to this alternate dimension with full consciousness dissociated from the original universe. Rick and Summer shut down the simulation in time, and convinces Morty to see it as a dream. They don't realise on every other side of the multiverse, every Elle would keep on living her life with Morty to the fullest, as the most precious and meaningful thing there is. Post-credits scene: The beginning scene of the series turns out to be the Defiance battle which Space Morty first meets Alien Elle.

== Production ==
=== Short films ===
A six-minute short film titled Samurai & Shogun aired unannounced on Adult Swim's Toonami programming block on March 29, 2020, during the hiatus of the fourth season of Rick and Morty, before being uploaded to Adult Swim's YouTube channel the following day. Written and directed by Kaichi Sato, and produced by Koji Iijima and Studio Deen and executive producer Maki Terashima-Furuta, the episode features a different animation and art style than usual, and is heavily themed around anime, specifically Lone Wolf & Cub. The short stars Yōhei Tadano as "Rick WTM-72" and Keisuke Chiba as "Shogun Morty", the pair reprising their roles from the Japanese dub of the animated series. The English subtitles were produced by Sentai Studios, who would later produce the subtitles the rest of the short films.

Another eight-minute short film titled Rick and Morty vs. Genocider aired unannounced on Toonami on July 26, 2020, debuting on YouTube slightly after. Written and directed by Takashi Sano, produced by Sola Entertainment, animated at Telecom Animation Film, and starring Tadano and Chiba as Rick and Morty, Manabu Muraji as Jerry, "AI Driver", and "Hologram Transvestite", and Yuki Minami as "Hologram Girl", the episode explores the conflict between President Morty and Rick C-137.

A third short film, titled Summer Meets God (Rick Meets Evil) and also written and directed by Takashi Sano, was released on YouTube on August 2, 2021, and aired on Adult Swim the following day. A fourth short film, titled The Great Yokai Battle of Akihabara, directed by Masaru Matsumoto and written by Naohiro Fukushima, was released on YouTube on October 10, 2021, and aired on Adult Swim the following day. A fifth short film, titled Samurai & Shogun Part 2 and featuring the return of Samurai & Shogun's Kaichi Sato as writer and director, was released on YouTube on November 12, 2021, as part of the 2021 Adult Swim Festival.

=== Development ===
In May 2022, Adult Swim announced a 10-episode order for Rick and Morty: The Anime, an anime television series from Telecom Animation Film. The series is written and directed by Takashi Sano.

== Release ==
The anime series premiered on Adult Swim English dubbed on August 16, 2024, and on its Toonami programming block in Japanese with English subtitles on August 18. Both the English dub and sub were produced by Sentai Studios.

The series was released on DVD and Blu-ray on April 29, 2025, from Warner Bros. Discovery Home Entertainment.

== Reception ==
The premiere episode received 192,000 viewers.

The series received mixed critical reviews. On the review aggregator website Rotten Tomatoes, 50% of 6 critics' reviews for the first season were positive, with an average rating of 5.8/10. Polly Conway of Common Sense Media gave the series a 2-out-of-5 star rating, stating, "Language, sci-fi violence in confusing anime spin-off". Matt Mahler of MovieWeb states, "it's a bizarrely incoherent disaster and a staggering disappointment".
