= Unmortricken =

- Rick and Morty episode
- Episode no.: Season 7 Episode 5
- Directed by: Jacob Hair
- Written by: Albro Lundy & James Siciliano
- Original air date: November 12, 2023

Episode chronology
← Previous "That's Amorte"	Next → "Rickfending Your Mort"
- Rick and Morty season 7

"Unmortricken" is the fifth episode of Rick and Morty's seventh season. It was written by Albro Lundy and James Siciliano and directed by Jacob Hair. The episode was met with a strong positive reception. The episode saw the closure of Rick's hunt for Rick Prime, the Rick who killed his family, as well as the return of Evil Morty.

== Plot ==
The episode opens with the backstory of Evil Morty, who used a device to control his Rick and murdered numerous other Ricks. (Note: As depicted in "Close Rick-counters of the Rick Kind" (2014).) He went on to be elected as the first Morty President of the Citadel, (Note: As depicted in "The Ricklantis Mixup" (2017).) before destroying it to escape the Central Finite Curve and explore the greater multiverse. (Note: As depicted in "Rickmurai Jack" (2021).)

Meanwhile, Rick C-137 and Morty Prime are destroying decoys of Rick Prime—who killed Rick C-137's family, however their actions are disrupting Evil Morty's peaceful life, so he teleports to them using his own portal. Evil Morty suggests filtering for probability, which singles out a specific decoy.

The Rick Prime decoy traps them in a prison with other vengeful Ricks, and forces them all to fight each other. The main three survive and escape, learning that Rick Prime has built an "Omega Device" which can destroy anything or anyone across the multiverse, of which he already used on Diane, Rick's wife. Rick uses the trap's fluid to locate Rick Prime and chooses to confront him alone, however the Mortys follow after him.

The three finally confront Rick Prime, who uses the Omega Device again on Rick's uncle Slow Mobius (Note: Last seen in "Ricksy Business" (2014).), so a brutal fight breaks out. Rick Prime is able to knock out Rick, but before he tries to kill Morty, Evil Morty is able to incapacitate him. Evil Morty obtains the schematics for the Omega Device, destroys all of Rick Prime's backup clones, and reawakens Rick to the incapacitated Rick Prime.

Rick Prime tries to reason with him as Evil Morty now stands as a bigger threat as well as how he is the reason Rick explored the multiverse, but Rick brutally punches Rick Prime to death. Evil Morty threatens Rick with the Omega Device and leaves. Morty comforts Rick as they return to living their lives. (Note: The song "Look on Down from the Bridge" by Mazzy Star plays, in a callback to "Rick Potion #9" (2014).)

In the post credits scene, Slow Mobius's wife starts a journey of revenge similarly to Rick, however she meets an alien who lost his wife, and the two find happiness together as a family.

== Reception ==
In a review for The Cinema Spot by John Daniel Tangalin, he praises the animations and background designs, as well as the morals behind the death of Rick Prime.

Since its release, "Unmortricken" has been considered one of the best Rick and Morty episodes of all time (the following rankings are all relative to other Rick and Morty episodes).

IGN ranked "Unmortricken" as #9 on its best episodes list.

Slashfilm ranked "Unmortricken" as #6 on its list of top 15 episodes.

Ranker.com ranked "Unmortricken" as #18 on its list of most upvoted episodes.
