= Rick and Morty season 7 =

Rick and Morty
- Season 7
- Blu-ray cover
- Showrunner: Scott Marder
- Starring: Chris Parnell; Spencer Grammer; Sarah Chalke; Ian Cardoni; Harry Belden
- No. of episodes: 10

Release
- Original network: Adult Swim
- Original release: October 15 – December 17, 2023

Season chronology
- ← Previous; Season 6 Next → Season 8

The seventh season of the American adult animated television series Rick and Morty premiered on October 15, 2023 and concluded on December 17, 2023. It consists of ten episodes.

The season was ordered before the fourth season of the show finished airing, in May 2020, as part of an order consisting of 70 episodes. It is the first season not to feature Justin Roiland providing any voice work, following his dismissal from the franchise in January 2023, though he and his company, Justin Roiland's Solo Vanity Card Productions!, are still credited. Ian Cardoni and Harry Belden were hired to replace him as the voices of Rick and Morty respectively.

== Voice cast and characters ==
=== Main ===
- Ian Cardoni as Rick Sanchez C-137, one of the show's two lead characters and Morty's grandfather, often shown as drunk while seeking to track down Rick Prime, a version of himself from a parallel universe who killed his first wife and daughter.
- Harry Belden as Morty Smith Prime, one of the show's two lead characters and Rick's grandson, often shown as nervous, unsure of himself and doubtful about Rick's extravagant adventures.
- Chris Parnell as:
  - Jerry Smith, Morty and Summer's father, Beth's husband, and Rick's son-in-law.
  - Tom, a news anchor who criticizes the President with his co-host Shonda.
- Spencer Grammer as Summer Smith, Morty's older sister and Rick's granddaughter.
- Sarah Chalke as Beth Smith and Space Beth Sanchez, Morty's and Summer's mothers, Jerry's wives, and Rick's daughters.

=== Recurring ===
- Tom Kenny as:
  - Gene Gilligan, the Smith family's neighbor.
  - Squanch "Squanchy", one of Rick's oldest friends.
  - Gul'Karna, a Yautja private investigator from the Predator franchise whom Wayne hired to follow his ex-wife Amy, only for him to instead date her.
  - Mr. Stabby, a sword-limbed talk show host who often accidentally kills his audiences when trying to take questions from them.
- Kari Wahlgren as:
  - Diane Sanchez, Rick's deceased wife.
  - The voice of the A.I. behind Rick's Space Cruiser and Garage.
  - Jessica W., Morty's sometimes-date and a "time god".
- Keith David as President Andre Curtis, the President of the United States and a rival of Rick's.
- Susan Sarandon as Dr. Helen Wong, the therapist to Rick and the Smith family.

=== Guest ===
- Jon Allen as Wayne "Mr. Poopybutthole" P.B., a long-time friend of the Smith family.
- Dan Harmon as:
  - Birdperson, one of Rick's oldest friends.
  - Ice-T/Water-T/Magma-T, a fictional version of the rapper who is an Alphabetrian.
- Scott Chernoff as Gearhead, one of Rick's oldest friends.
- Beck Bennett as The Sheriff, a sheriff who tracks down Gene's destructive runaway lawnmower.
- Hugh Jackman as Himself, Gene's cousin-in-law.
- Lauren Tom as:
  - Amy, Mr. Poopybutthole's ex-wife and Gul'Karna's girlfriend.
  - Birddaughter, Birdperson's daughter with Tammy Gueterman.
- Christina Hendricks as Unity, an alien collective hive mind and Rick's ex-girlfriend.
- Debra Wilson as:
  - Shonda, a news anchor who works with Tom and criticizes President Curtis.
  - Madame President, the president of "Spaghetti Planet".
  - Sinistar-7, an elite member of the Numbericons and daughter of Emperor Dreadnaught.
- Chris Romano as Slo Mobius, a family man able to slow down time.
- Ryan Hansen as The Observers
- Maria Bamford as:
  - Churry, a sentient churro Rick brought to life.
  - Nana Smith, the deceased grandmother of Jerry Smith.
- Glen Powell as Kuayle
- Echo Kellum as Brad
- Cassie Steele as Tricia Lange
- Aislinn Paul as Nancy
- Ice-T as Magma-Q, the Alphabetrian father of Ice-T/Water-T who was killed when the Numbericons attacked.
- Peter Serafinowicz as Oxygen-S/8/Infinity
- Maurice LaMarche as Bigfoot
- Liev Schreiber as Fear Hole Promoter

== Episodes ==
No. overall	No. in season	Title	Directed by	Written by	Original release date	U.S. viewers (millions)
62	1	"How Poopy Got His Poop Back"	Lucas Gray	Nick Rutherford	October 15, 2023	0.42
After his divorce from Amy, Mr. Wayne Poopybutthole stays over at the Smith household, but the Smith family grows tired of his uncontrolled alcoholism and orders Rick to rectify the problem. Rick gathers his friends Gearhead, Squanchy, Birdperson as well as neighbour Gene in order to stage an intervention. Rick and his friends quickly end up partying with Mr. Poopybutthole. instead, and are eventually joined by Gene's cousin-in-law Hugh Jackman. However, Mr. Poopybutthole still cannot stop thinking about Amy and his son Poopy Jr., so he convinces Rick and his friends to go and try to mend their relationship. They are shocked to find out Amy is in a relationship with Gul'Karna, a Predator private investigator Mr. Poopybutthole hired to spy on her. Mr. Poopybutthole attempts to kidnap Poopy Jr. while Rick and his friends beat up Gul'Karna. Mr. Poopybutthole realizes he's setting a terrible example for his son and returns him to Amy and Gul'Karna. Afterwards, Mr. Poopybutthole decides to sober up and move on from Amy while Rick and his friends go their separate ways. Post-credits scene: Police attempt to stop Gene's runaway rideable lawnmower, which has been wreaking havoc ever since it was left to run on its own after Rick recruited Gene. The Sheriff is run over and killed while shooting at the lawnmower, only for it to run out of gasoline and shut down moments later.
63	2	"The Jerrick Trap"	Kyounghee Lim	Albro Lundy & James Siciliano	October 22, 2023	0.47
After Rick and Jerry argue over whether Rick was born intelligent, Rick swaps their minds to prove his point. Rick in Jerry's body commits suicide in horror while Jerry in Rick's body accidentally kills himself with Rick's cybernetic enhancements. Rick's medical robot heals them, but the process ends up with both Rick and Jerry possessing half of each others' brains, blending their personalities. Meanwhile, Morty is captured by alien gangsters who realize their mistake and apologize to Rick. The half-Rick and half-Jerry go to pick Morty up, but their bickering causes the gangsters to sense weakness and attack the trio. They are able to fight their way back home, but the half-Rick and half-Jerry realize they are happier the way they are now and run away to go on adventures together, naming themselves Burger and Fries. When the gangsters kidnap Morty, Beth, and Summer, Burger and Fries realize they are still responsible for their families. They combine their bodies into the composite being Jerricky and rescues them. Afterwards, the Smith family force Jerricky to separate back into the normal Rick and Jerry, and they go back to bickering with each other. Post-credits scene: It is revealed that Memory Rick from "Rickternal Friendshine of the Spotless Mort" is trapped in Jerry's mind and trying to escape. His efforts are hindered because of Jerry's belief that all technology is powered by gears and springs, preventing Memory Rick from fabricating the device he needs.
64	3	"Air Force Wong"	Jacob Hair	Alex Rubens	October 29, 2023	0.36
President Curtis summons Rick, requesting that he infiltrate Virginia under suspicion that the entire population has joined a cult. However, Curtis also mandates Rick bring along his therapist Dr. Helen Wong, leading Rick to suspect Curtis wants to date her. When President Curtis and Rick enter Virginia, they discover that the entire state has been taken over by Unity, who is worried about Rick's hunt for Rick Prime. Unity is convinced to leave and Dr. Wong breaks up with Curtis, citing that he needs to overcome his obsession for everybody's approval. President Curtis finally cracks under the pressure and hijacks the Virginia hive mind for himself, spreading the infection across the world to fulfill his desire for 100% approval ratings. Rick enlists Dr. Wong's aid to convince Unity to stop the President, and they agree to help and remove all of the infected humans from the hive mind. Later, Rick visits Curtis, where the latter considers getting therapy. Post-credits scene: Talk show host Mr. Stabby appears on the alien talk show "Gary Live" where Gary questions him about killing over 58,000 people with his sword arms during his shows. Mr. Stabby replies that his audiences attend his shows voluntarily knowing the risks and points out his methods work since everybody is talking about his show.
65	4	"That's Amorte"	Lucas Gray	Heather Anne Campbell	November 5, 2023	0.44
Rick serves the family spaghetti, which Morty accidentally discovers is sourced from a planet where people's bodies turn into spaghetti if they commit suicide, but not if they die any other way. Feeling guilty, Morty reveals the truth at a funeral. After this, the planet's President legalizes suicide, and spaghetti becomes the planet's primary export, with most people channeled into suicide to be sold as spaghetti to meet the demand. Rick's attempts to fix things by sourcing the spaghetti from clones end disastrously, so he has one last terminally ill person, Fred Bunks, commit suicide on a live broadcast and offers his spaghetti to Morty. During the broadcast, Rick televises Fred's entire life, causing everyone to vomit at the horrors they are committing and turning everyone off spaghetti. Later, Rick serves the family Salisbury steak, warning that its source is also horrifying. The family laughs this off, content to remain ignorant of its origin. Post-credits scene: On a planet of sentient vacuum cleaners, a similar planet-wide broadcast reveals that vacuum bags come from deceased plant creatures, causing all the vacuums to vomit dust.
66	5	"Unmortricken"	Jacob Hair	Albro Lundy & James Siciliano	November 12, 2023	0.46
The episode opens by showing Evil Morty's backstory: having grown tired of demeaning adventures with his Rick, Evil Morty implanted devices to control him and erased records of himself from the Citadel, leading into his actions throughout the series. (Note: As depicted in "Close Rick-counters of the Rick Kind", "The Ricklantis Mixup", and "Rickmurai Jack".) His peaceful retirement outside the Central Finite Curve is interrupted by Rick and Morty's search for Rick Prime. Evil Morty confronts Rick and Morty, and all three are captured by Rick Prime, along with other Ricks whose wives were killed by him. After surviving a gladiator match with the other Ricks, they find Rick Prime and learn he built "The Omega Device", a machine which can erase anyone from every universe, which he used to erase Rick's wife Diane, and demonstrates by summoning and erasing Slow Mobius (Rick's "uncle"). Evil Morty incapacitates Rick Prime, and steals and deactivates the Omega Device before allowing Rick to beat Rick Prime to death. Evil Morty leaves with the Omega device, using it as warning for Rick and Morty to not come after him, as he simply wants to be left alone. Rick and Morty then travel home, with Rick returning to his daily routine while being visibly fazed by the preceding events, unsatisfied with his revenge. Post-credits scene: Slow Mobius' wife goes searching for him throughout the multiverse to no avail, the same way Rick searched for Rick Prime. She eventually meets an alien who similarly lost his wife, and they marry. Content with her new life, she lets go of her search.
67	6	"Rickfending Your Mort"	Jacob Hair	Cody Ziglar	November 19, 2023	0.40
With Rick in no mood to go on any adventures, Morty tries to encourage him by cashing in his Morty Adventure Cards. Suspecting that Morty may have lied about the number of adventures they have gone on, Rick enlists the aid of an omniscient alien rock called the Observer to audit the Adventure Cards. As the Observer shows them various past adventures, Rick and Morty eventually get fed up with him treating their lives like a clip show and tell him to leave. However, the Observer returns and begins harassing the entire Smith family by showing clips of their most embarrassing moments. Morty loses his temper and strikes the Observer, inadvertently killing him and inciting the anger of the other Observers to put them on trial on whether they are good or evil. The Observers then make legal arguments based on Rick and Morty's past exploits before sentencing them to death. In response, Rick hacks their observation technology and shows that the Observers regularly abuse their powers for selfish gains, causing the Observers to attack each other. Rick and Morty escape in the confusion, and Rick decides to take Morty on a new adventure. Post-credits scene: Morty opens his locker and is shocked to find a warning left behind by Churry, a sentient churro he had Rick bring to life, befriended, and subsequently abandoned on an uninhabited planet earlier in the episode, with Churry swearing to take revenge on him.
68	7	"Wet Kuat Amortican Summer"	Kyounghee Lim	Alex Song-Xia	November 26, 2023	0.49
Summer obtains an "attribute slider" from Rick that allows her to change her physical attributes which she plans to use to impress her friends at a party. However, Morty gets jealous and tries to steal the attribute slider, causing them to both fall into the pool. The water short circuits the attribute slider which fuses Summer and Morty's bodies together and Morty becomes a "Kuato". Summer is ridiculed by her friends and Rick refuses to reverse the effects unless she does chores for him. Summer attends a nightclub exclusively for Kuato holders like her, organized by a man named Kenneth, who is running a Kuato trafficking ring and steals Morty. Summer and Rick reunite and Summer uses her Kuato psychic connection to locate Morty on Kenneth's yacht. After a brief fight, Rick throws Kenneth overboard to drown and gifts his robot walker to Morty. Later, Morty uses his robot walker to win his school's frolf tournament, allowing Summer to earn her classmates' respect again. Summer also decides to go out with a woman she saved from the Kuato trafficking ring. Post-credits scene: In a parody of Squid Game, the rich buyer who purchased Morty jokes about how he plans to rename Morty "69" because he paid 69 million florbos for him. He and his friends make several more jokes about the number until one reveals he has a wife, weirding out the others.
69	8	"Rise of the Numbericons: The Movie"	Lucas Gray	Rob Schrab	December 3, 2023	0.38
Continuing from the post-credits scene of "Get Schwifty", Water-T fights off the Numbericon invasion of his home planet. Having inherited a pendant called the "I of Harmony" from his late father Magma-Q, Water-T reluctantly decides to consult his old math teacher, Mr. Goldenfold, over the mathematical equation written on it. However, the Numbericon Sinistar-7 tracks down Water-T, forcing him to flee with both Goldenfold and Morty. Goldenfold manages to decipher the equation to discover the location of the mythical planet E-10 where Water-T and Sinistar-7 reluctantly team up to unlock the I of Harmony's secrets. However, Numbericon spy Number Eight steals the power of the I of Harmony for himself, becoming Infinity. Going mad with power, Infinity begins massacring both Alphabetrians and Numbericons. Water-T uses the power of rap to unite the Alphabetrians and Numbericons against Infinity and the spirit of Magma-Q transforms him into Magma-T. Magma-T and Sinistar-7 then use their love to power the I of Harmony and destroy Infinity. Afterwards, Morty picks up a new appreciation for math and Magma-T finally turns in his overdue homework to Goldenfold. Post-credits scene: The Geomitron Ice Cube requests help from Magma-T and Sinistar-7, now the leaders of the united Alphanumericons, to help save his home planet. Magma-T and Sinistar-7 agree to aid Ice Cube in a new adventure titled "Magma-T & Ice Cube in: Challenge of the Geomitrons".
70	9	"Mort: Ragnarick"	Kyounghee Lim	Jeremy Gilfor & Scott Marder	December 10, 2023	0.29
After repeatedly killing and reviving Jerry in an experiment, Rick confirms the afterlife exists and possesses an infinite amount of energy. Rick and Morty go to Norway so Rick can enter Valhalla, but he has Bigfoot kill him as he must be killed by a great warrior. Rick enters Valhalla to harvest the energy, only for Morty to arrive having been killed by Bigfoot. The Vikings, believing they're witches, attack Rick until he convinces them he is Odin. Meanwhile, Bigfoot chases after a feral clone of Rick only to be captured by the Pope who uses him to kill all the church's enemies. When Rick and Morty return Bigfoot cuts a deal with them to stop the Pope. The Pope, having gained the energy from the Afterlife, kills them, but they revive using Operation Phoenix, making Bigfoot a human in the process. After failing to stop the Pope with the help of Count Dracula, Frankenstein's monster, Wolfman, Mummy, and Gill-man, Rick tricks the Vikings into pulling the plug on the energy after they escape, stripping the Pope of his powers. After Rick traps the Pope in a Pokéball, Rick and Morty send Bigfoot back into the woods, despite the fact he's human now. Post-credits scene: Rick has the Pope fight in an underground Pokémon fight only to be saved by the police who break up the underground fight which Rick fled from. The Pope is horrified to learn Rick's feral clone has become the new Pope.
71	10	"Fear No Mort"	Eugene Huang	Heather Anne Campbell	December 17, 2023	0.45
Rick and Morty find that after all of their experiences, there is nothing that can scare or surprise them anymore. They are then approached by a man in a suit who offers them a truly terrifying experience, bringing them to a "Fear Hole" located in a Denny's bathroom. Morty decides to face his fears in the Hole, leading Rick to jump in after him to rescue him from the monsters inside. Upon returning home after supposedly conquering the Hole, Rick and Morty realize that they're still inside when Rick's dead wife Diane appears from a different reality. Rick initially chooses to live in the Fear Hole with 'Diane', even as its power begins to slowly kill him, but upon seeing the same thing happen to Morty as he prostrates himself in several attempts to conquer his fears and leave the hole, Rick leaves the Fear Hole Diane behind to escape with Morty. However, every attempt they make to leave the Fear Hole fails, with them constantly finding themselves in a hole-within-the-hole. After several failed escapes, Rick offhandedly mentions his belief that Morty is irreplaceable, which causes Morty to realize he's not talking to the real Rick, and that Rick never followed him into the Fear Hole to begin with. Morty comes to the realization that his true fear is Rick abandoning him, allowing him to finally conquer and escape the Fear Hole. Rick is tempted to jump in upon hearing that the Fear Hole can manifest Diane, but ultimately decides against it, instead choosing to leave behind a picture of Morty from inside his wallet to commemorate his conquering of the Fear Hole. Post-credits scene: Mr. Poopybutthole uses a stolen portal gun to switch places with another version of himself in a universe where he is still married to Amy. While it seems like Mr. Poopybutthole's plan worked, the alternate Amy is immediately suspicious of him.

== Production ==
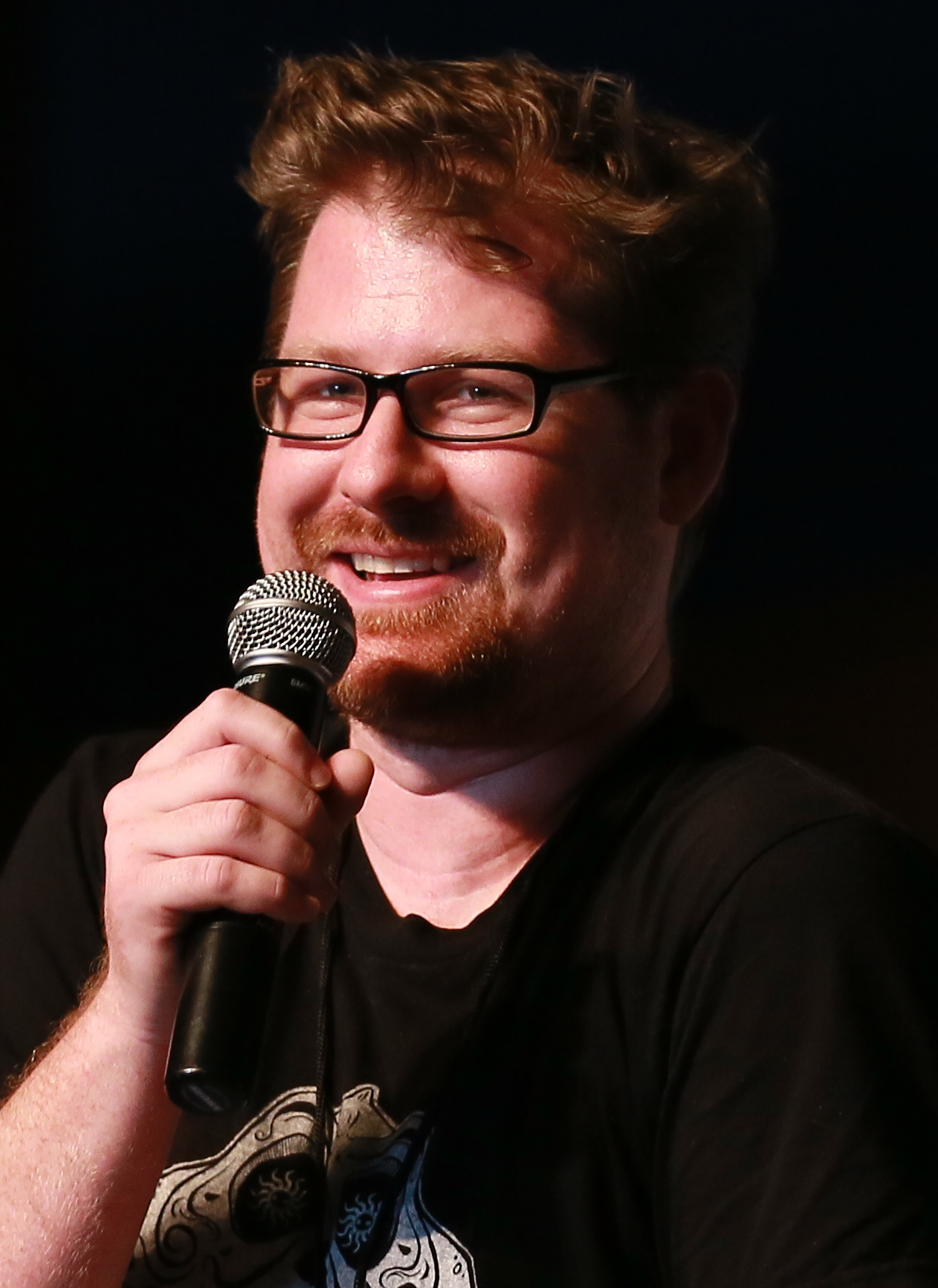
Co-creator, co-executive producer and voice actor Justin Roiland was fired by Adult Swim after allegations over domestic abuse.

=== Development ===
The season is a part of a long-term deal between show creators Justin Roiland and Dan Harmon and Adult Swim, confirming 70 new episodes would be released over an unspecified number of seasons. Thirty of those episodes were aired as part of season four, season five and season six, leaving forty episodes remaining.

=== Casting ===
After charges of felony domestic abuse, which were subsequently dropped due to a lack of evidence, Justin Roiland was removed from the show prior to the seventh season. Adult Swim hired two new voice "soundalike" talent for the show's titular characters, announced as unknown actors Ian Cardoni and Harry Belden on the season premiere. Cardoni was cast first due to his Rick impression, which, series writer Scott Marder mentioned, was difficult to cast as "everyone sounded like Macho Man Randy Savage or like a cousin of his. No one sounded exactly like Rick". Belden was cast much later "after exhausting every possible resource".

Mr. Poopybutthole/Wayne P.B., who was previously voiced by Roiland, is voiced by actor Jon Allen. Marder said Allen's role provided room for some of Roiland's other replacements to focus on the main cast. Starting with the episode "Rise of the Numbericons: The Movie", the character Magma-Q, another character that was previously voiced by Roiland, is voiced by rapper Ice-T.

== Release ==
The seventh season premiered on October 15, 2023. The episode titles for season 7 were released through social media on August 31, 2023.

== Reception ==
On the review aggregator Rotten Tomatoes, season 7 has a 77% score based on 12 reviews, with an average rating of 6.30/10. The site's critics consensus reads: "Recasting its titular pair with fairly seamless results, the famously unpredictable Rick and Morty settles into a holding pattern that nevertheless still yields plenty of amusing invention." On Metacritic, the season has a score of 73 out of 100, based on reviews from 6 critics, indicating "generally favorable reviews".

Reviewing the first two episodes, Alan Sepinwall of Rolling Stone noted that the characters who had new voice actors sounded virtually indistinguishable from their appearances in previous seasons. Jake Kleinman for Inverse agreed, finding the voice swap did not impact the show, but did describe the writing and trajectory of the series as disappointing. Alison Foreman, writing for IndieWire, was disappointed that the creatives chose to "maintain the status quo" rather than taking the show in a new direction even after Roiland's removal from the series.

As of 2025, season 7 is the show's worst-received season.
