= Evil Morty =

Fictional character

- Rick and Morty character
- First appearance: "Close Rick-counters of the Rick Kind" (2014)
- Created by: Stephen Sandoval; Ryan Ridley
- Based on: Morty Smith by: Justin Roiland; Dan Harmon
- Voiced by: Justin Roiland (2013–2021); Harry Belden (2023–present); Ian Cardoni (2023; as "Evil Rick"); Keisuke Chiba (Japanese dub; Rick and Morty: The Anime)

In-universe information
- Nicknames: Morty; Evil Morty (ironically)
- Species: Human
- Gender: Male
- Title(s): President Morty; Candidate Morty
- Occupation: President of The Citadel (formerly)
- Affiliation: The Citadel: Morty Party; Rick Army
- Weapon: Mind control/reading eyepatch The Weapon Too Cool for a Name/Omega Device (season 7)
- Family: Dimension 79⊢⊇V: Rick Sanchez (grandfather); Smith family
- Home: Dome, Outside the Central Finite Curve; Earth, Dimension 79⊢⊇V (formerly)
- Nationality: American
- Age: 14
- Theme song: "For the Damaged Coda" by Blonde Redhead

Mortimer Chauncey Smith of Dimension 79⊢⊇V is a recurring character from the American animated television series Rick and Morty and resulting franchise. Created by Stephen Sandoval and Ryan Ridley, and voiced by Justin Roiland for the first five seasons of the series, followed by Harry Belden beginning with the seventh season, Evil Morty is an inter-dimensional traveller and an alternate version of Morty Smith Prime (created by Roiland and Dan Harmon) from another dimension in the multiverse, where-in sick of the adventures his grandfather Rick Sanchez 79⊢⊇V would force him to endure, he had developed a mind control eyepatch to control his Rick, aiming to find a way to break free of the Central Finite Curve and the influence of the Ricks residing on it.

Introduced in "Close Rick-counters of the Rick Kind" as Eyepatch Morty and the controller of Evil Rick", he takes on a new identity as Candidate Morty in "The Ricklantis Mixup" and is elected President Morty of the inter-dimensional Citadel of Ricks and Morty's (populated by numerous alternate versions of himself and Rick). In "Rickmurai Jack", now ironically dubbed Evil Morty by Morty Prime, he uses the Citadel's population as fuel to escape the Curve. The character returns in "Unmortricken" (the opening sequence of which exploring his origin story), in which after Rick C-137's search for Rick Prime messes with the stability of Evil Morty's new home, he helps him find and defeat Rick Prime before acquiring the latter's device capable of erasing anyone from every universe, and asking that neither Rick or Morty attempt to track him down again lest he have to use it. He returns once more in the season 9 premiere "There's Something About Morty", where it's revealed he and Rick C-137 have been working together in secret since the killing of Prime. They, along with Morty Prime then go on an adventure to defeat an entity threatening the Central Finite Curve known as the Collective. After it's defeated, Rick successfully destroys the Omega Device with its own schematics while Evil Morty is distracted. Evil Morty quickly figures out what happened and furiously tracks Rick down to a bunker dimension where the two fight. Rick eventually outsmarts Evil Morty, getting him arrested by the time police for using a time freezing device. Alternate versions of the character from parallel dimensions are featured in the 2017 comic book limited series Pocket Like You Stole It, the 2020 short film Rick and Morty vs. Genocider, the 2021 short film Rick + Morty in the Eternal Nightmare Machine, and the 2024 anime series Rick and Morty: The Anime.

In November 2021, Evil Morty was added as a playable character in the role-playing video game Pocket Mortys, and in August 2022, to the beta release of the crossover fighting game MultiVersus. The character has received a universally positive critical reception, praised for his iconic mind control eyepatch, theme song, and outwardly calm and understanding, yet inwardly cunning and ruthless demeanor.

== Development ==
In an interview with TheWrap in September 2017, series co-creator Dan Harmon described Evil Morty's storyline in "The Ricklantis Mixup" as having been "trying to craft more of a timeless story [like] Robert Redford in ‘The Candidate.’ Just any kind of political City Hall thriller story there". In September 2021, Harmon called Evil Morty's plan in "Rickmurai Jack" as being "about bringing [Rick C-137 and Morty Prime's] relationship to the limit — going so far as to explain Rick's bullshit is what inspired the "evil" in Evil Morty's nature — and about showcasing Morty's depthless well of empathy…and perhaps neediness, but also ample empathy".

In June 2023, discussing the reasoning for the breadths of time between the character's appearances, Harmon elaborated that "to feel the characters evolve" he must "always [appear] in small touches, otherwise we would risk saying too much, and we would have nothing more to say! The rule is that there must be at least one episode each season evoking the 'big story'. That way people are rewarded for continuing to watch the show". Discussing Evil Morty's team-up with Rick C-137 and Morty Prime against Rick Prime in "Unmortricken" that November, Harmon called it "a great idea to lean into [that] gave me vibes of The Wire — learning throughout the first season that there’s different flavors of bad guy, and then you get that satisfaction of watching your favorite drug dealers against the one that had absolutely proven himself to be a merciless sociopath. That idea of team ups where it's not as simple, as saccharine as, ‘I’ll put on a white hat, you put on a white hat. Let’s go after the guy with black hat.’", in describing how the episode gives "the audience does [a] chance to learn more about his psychology just as he's poised to take on an even more prominent role in the series' canon". In February 2024, Rick and Morty showrunner Scott Marder confirmed the character would return in future seasons, stating that the creatives to "have plans and grand designs with him" in the works.

== Biography ==
=== Season 1 ===
In the first season episode "Close Rick-counters of the Rick Kind", Eyepatch Morty is introduced alongside Evil Rick in the opening scene as he tranquilizes and captures another Morty while Evil Rick kills the other Rick. Later, Eyepatch Morty as Evil Rick greets Rick C-137 and his Morty as they arrive at their lair, with Evil Rick interrogating Rick C-137 while Eyepatch Morty silently puts Morty in a prison alongside the other Morty's they had captured, using their intelligence brainwaves as a way to conceal themselves from the Citadel, a society of Ricks and Morty's from other realities who rule the multiverse. After Morty convinces the other Morty's to overthrow Evil Rick, beating him to death before he can reveal to Rick why he had framed him for murder, Eyepatch Morty is among the Morty's relocated to the Citadel by the Council of Ricks. In the closing scene, a pair of Ricks discover Evil Rick to have a receiver implanted in his brain and have been controlled remotely; elsewhere, Eyepatch Morty removes his eyepatch, the transmitter, and crushes it under his foot, revealing him to have been the true mastermind controlling the dialogue and actions of Evil Rick.

=== Season 3 ===
Following the decimation of the Citadel and death of the Council of Ricks at the hands of Rick C-137 in the third season premiere "The Rickshank Rickdemption", a Candidate Morty represents the Morty Party in the presidential election to elect the first President of the Citadel in "The Ricklantis Mixup". Although his Campaign Manager Morty doubts he has any chance at being elected, Candidate Morty becomes the front-runner after giving an inspiring speech, before firing Campaign Manager Morty for having doubted his abilities. The following day, Campaign Manager Morty shoots Candidate Morty after receiving secret documents from him from a trench coat-wearing Rick; before being executed the following night by being thrown out of an airlock for the attempt, Campaign Manager Morty learns not only that Candidate Morty has survived his assassination attempt, but that he has been elected President. After being threatened by the Shadow Council of Ricks who had truly run the previous Citadel, the newly dubbed President Morty has those who stand against him executed and their bodies were thrown out of the Citadel's airlocks. Outside, amongst the bodies of hundreds of other Ricks and Morty's, the secret documents that Campaign Manager Morty was given are revealed to confirm that Eyepatch Morty and President Morty are the same person.

"This seems like a good time for a drink, and a cold, calculated speech with sinister overtones. A speech about politics, about order, brotherhood, power... But speeches are for campaigning. Now... is the time for action."

=== Season 5 ===
President Morty returns in the fifth season finale "Rickmurai Jack". In the episode, it is revealed that—bitter about the continuous replacement and exploitation of versions of himself and disgusted by Rick's narcissism—President Morty—ironically dubbed Evil Morty by Morty Prime—seeks to break free of the Rick-centered, Central Finite Curve and into the wider multiverse where Ricks don't control the outcome of the Smith family (i.e. using certain techniques that lead to Jerry and Beth Smith having children), and aren't necessarily the smartest.

"Every version of us has spent every version of all of our lives in one infinite crib, built around an infinite fucking baby. And I'm leaving it. That's what makes me "evil" — being sick of him."

In order to do so, Evil Morty framed and then captured Rick C-137 in "Close Encounters of the Rick Kind" to scan his mind for the designs for the Citadel (as C-137 was its original architect) in order to use it to breach the curve. After capturing Rick and Morty and completing the scan of Rick's brain, Evil Morty initiates his plan, killing thousands of Ricks and Morty's and using their destroyed bodies to power the Citadel, transformed into a massive portal gun. Once escaping from and destroying the curve, Evil Morty uses his own portal gun to create a yellow portal and enter the wider multiverse.

=== Season 7 ===
Evil Morty returns in the seventh season episode "Unmortricken", where he is revealed to be from Dimension 79⊢⊇V; after his Rick had challenged him to "quit" after an adventure-gone-wrong, he had gotten him drunk and taken him over with a mind control eyepatch. He then goes to the Citadel to delete his public records, while keeping his Rick as a slave. This leads to his future actions throughout the series. His retirement is interrupted by portals opening outside the curve, caused by Rick and Morty searching for Rick Prime. Frustrated, Evil Morty confronts Rick and Morty, nonchalantly narrowing down Rick's search to a single location, and all three are captured by Rick Prime, along with other Ricks whose wives were killed by him when he erased her from every universe using the Device Too Cool for a Name, also known as the Omega Device. Slightly intrigued, Evil Morty helps Rick and Morty survive a gladiator match with the other Ricks, before they find Rick Prime situated at a massive new Omega Device. Following an extended battle, Evil Morty incapacitates Rick Prime, steals and deactivates the Omega Device after copying its plans for himself, and allows Rick to beat Rick Prime to death. As Rick feels like he's lost his purpose, Evil Morty notes that he knows the feeling, before asking that the pair not go after him lest he have to use his knowledge of the Omega Device to erase either one of them.

=== Season 9 ===
Evil Morty once again returns in the Season 9 premiere "There's Something About Morty". It's revealed that he and Rick have been secretly working together to defend the Central Finite Curve from various threats since the death of Rick Prime, using a new Omega Device with an alternate Rick, Beth, Jerry and Summer inside as leverage. He once again recruits Rick to fight a new threat known as the Collective, where Morty Prime finds out about the partnership and joins them. After a fight where the Collective is defeated, Rick, Morty, and Evil Morty travel to a diner, where he mocks Morty Prime and reveals that Rick had shown him time travel technology. Evil Morty allows the two to leave, returning to his own base to find it and the Omega Device had been destroyed by Rick behind his back. Rick used the Omega device on its blueprint to erase itself from the entire multiverse and their timelines, therefore making it impossible to be recreated. Once he realized what had happened, Evil Morty became furious and quickly tracked Rick down to a bunker dimension, where he traveled to and began a fight with Rick. He is eventually overpowered and attempts to use Rick's arsenal against him and Morty, but is attacked by the rest of the Smith family. This forces Evil Morty to use a time stopping device he built himself after seeing Rick's own time technology as a last resort to kill him. Rick however had anticipated this, and alerted the Time Police prior to the fight. Evil Morty is quickly surrounded by the time police and forced to surrender, then being sent to a time prison.

== Other versions ==
=== Pocket Like You Stole It ===
The comic book limited series Pocket Like You Stole It explore the origin story of the Pocket Morty's version of the character, a separate Evil Morty from Dimension C-594 (formerly known as "Plain Ol' Morty") who became "sick of" Ricks due to witnessing the exploitation and mass cloning of other Morty's within the "Pocket Morty's" death game. Another Evil Morty also appears in the series, living in a small cage next to a skull candle, and wearing a black turtleneck sweater while twirling his handlebar moustache.

=== Story Train Evil Morty ===
In a possible future in "Never Ricking Morty", Evil Morty is shown to be in command of several armies of alternate versions of Rick Sanchez and Mr. Meeseeks, alongside the Gazorpazorp species, Morty Smith Jr., and a Palpatine-dressed Mr. Poopybutthole, with Morty himself equipped with a robotic arm and trident while wearing a cape and his mind-control eyepatch. Generated by the Story Train as a physical representation of the limitless potential of the future, this version of Evil Morty is confused (along with all the other characters) when the train's own Story Rick and Morty begin praying to Jesus Christ to help them, an out-of-character-enough moment to cause the train's antagonist Story Lord to intervene.

=== Rick and Morty vs. Genocider ===
In the Rick and Morty anime short Rick and Morty vs. Genocider, an alternate spectacled President Morty and the Citadel send another Morty on a mission to Japan to track down Rick C-137 and prevent him from joining a renegade group of Ricks commanding "The Genocider". After Rick C-137 destroys The Genocider and is apparently himself killed, President Morty is revealed to have been in control of both The Genocider and the forces of the Citadel he sent alongside the other Morty, before ordering a memorial constructed for the fallen Ricks and disposing of his remote control for The Genocider. After then entering a hallway alone, he looks somberly into the distance.

=== Rick + Morty in the Eternal Nightmare Machine ===
An alternate version of Evil Morty appears in the 2021 short film Rick + Morty in the Eternal Nightmare Machine. Existing within a simulation, sitting on a throne surrounded by The Matrix-inspired monitors of his visage, and declaring himself "God of this Infinite Hell", he warns Rick and Morty that the Nightmare Machine cannot die, and they will now become as Void, before vanishing on being punched in the face by Morty, before a giant robotic floating head of his visage attacks them.

== In other media ==
The cliffhanger ending of the Oni Press Rick and Morty comic series arc "Rick Revenge Squad" alludes to a potential future alliance between an alternate version of Evil Morty (as President Morty), Lucius Needful, Zeep Xanflorp, Supernova, Beta VII, Phoenixperson, and the rebuilt Galactic Federation.

=== Video games ===
In November 2021, Evil Morty was added as a playable character in the role-playing video game Pocket Morty's, with his design based on his appearance in "Rickmurai Jack", after having been playable as the Evil Rick whose actions and dialogue he remotely controlled in "Close Rick-counters of the Rick Kind" since the game's launch in January 2016. In November 2023, a new skin of Evil Morty was added to the game as "Original Grandson Morty", after his Morty Prime disguise from "Unmortricken".

In August 2022, Evil Morty was added as a playable character to the beta release of the crossover fighting game MultiVersus as a series of alternate character skins for Morty Smith, with his primary design based on his President Morty appearance in "The Ricklantis Mixup", as well as the "Story Train Evil Morty" from "Never Ricking Morty".

== Reception ==
The character has received an overall positive reception. The theme song of the character, "For the Damaged Coda" (2000) by indie rock band Blonde Redhead, gained renewed exposure for its use in the series, spawning several memes around the character and song.

Vulture praised "the blissed-out sexy indie [theme] music" of the newly-dubbed President (Evil) Morty and their initially "adorable and non[-]threatening" appearance in "The Ricklantis Mixup", in addition to expressing interest in the various fan theories around the character. Screen Rant praised the character as "one of the most compelling villains the series could offer" despite their "brief and cryptic" appearances, in particular complimenting their manipulative character traits, while Flickering Myth praised the character as "a [big] fan favourite and easily the show’s most enigmatic character." Paste referred to "the mo[st] sobering aspect of Evil Morty's return [a]s the realization that he’s…not so different from the Patrick Bate-Morty we met in "Rest and Ricklaxation" two weeks ago. Ruthless, confident, without a conscience and smarter than he gets credit for are all traits we've seen embodied in Morty's ideal of himself, and they all exist in Evil Morty, who now seems like a possible culmination of the aforementioned long-term moral development (or atrophy) of the Morty we know. The Mary Sue praised the initial character concept as "generator of a million theories, wisely held back by the writers for moments of maximum punch", describing their reintroduction as "the perfect way to force the issue of our Morty’s increased instability and keep things from reverting to the status quo." before concluding that:

"[Justin] Roiland sells the gravitas and magnetism of Eyepatch Morty well—it’s easy to forget that this is a character we know very little about, beyond what could be extrapolated through the Rick he was controlling. Given the opportunity to start from not-quite-scratch, we’re presented with a character who is inscrutable on a larger scale but understandable in the moment. He’s a chameleon and, by his admission, a believer in action. It’s a fantastic setup, effectively deploying the return of the now infamous “For the Damaged [Coda]” backing track without feeling forced."

Since the release of "Close Rick-counters of the Rick Kind" in March 2014, Evil Morty has become one of the most popular characters in the overall Rick and Morty franchise, with several memes being made about him and "life's most dramatic twists and turns", in particular based around the "For the Damaged Coda" theme song.

=== Accolades and nominations ===
Year	Award	Category	Nominee(s)	Result	Ref.
2015	BTVA Voice Acting Awards	Best Male Lead Vocal Performance in a Television Series — Comedy/Musical	Justin Roiland	Won	
2017	IGN Awards	Best Comedic TV Performance	Justin Roiland	Won	
2021	Critics' Choice Super Awards	Best Voice Actor in an Animated Series	Justin Roiland	Nominated	
