= The Ricklantis Mixup =

- Rick and Morty episode
- Episode no.: Season 3 Episode 7
- Directed by: Dominic Polcino
- Written by: Dan Guterman; Ryan Ridley
- Original air date: September 10, 2017
- Running time: 21 minutes

Episode chronology
← Previous "Rest and Ricklaxation"	Next → "Morty's Mind Blowers"
- Rick and Morty season 3

"The Ricklantis Mixup" (also known as "Tales from the Citadel") is the seventh episode of the third season of Rick and Morty, and the twenty-eighth episode of the series overall. It premiered on Adult Swim on September 10, 2017. It was written by Dan Guterman and Ryan Ridley, and directed by Dominic Polcino. In the episode, as the main Rick and Morty adventure offscreen to Atlantis, the focus is shifted towards the Citadel, an interdimensional society populated by numerous versions of Ricks and Mortys from different realities. The episode received critical acclaim and is considered by some to be the best episode of the show, with approximately 2.4 million viewers when airing. A stand-alone sequel to the first season episode "Close Rick-counters of the Rick Kind", its narrative was continued in the fifth season finale "Rickmurai Jack" and the seventh season episode "Unmortricken".

With the exception of the narration for a Simple Rick's commercial (voiced by Jeff B. Davis) and a single line from a young Beth Sanchez (voiced by Sarah Chalke), this episode was entirely voiced by Justin Roiland as the various Ricks and Mortys.

== Plot ==
As the mainline Rick C-137 and Morty Prime prepare for what Rick insists is a "self-contained" adventure to Atlantis, they are interrupted by another Rick and Morty looking for donations to the reconstruction of the Interdimensional Citadel of Ricks following the events of "The Rickshank Rickdemption". Morty wonders what is occurring in the Citadel before embarking on his adventure with Rick. The episode then instead shifts to the Citadel to follow several plots.

=== The Campaign ===
In the Citadel, a presidential election is ongoing following the assassination of the Council of Ricks by Rick C-137. Tensions rise over the treatment of Mortys as second class citizens and the controversial Candidate Morty of the Morty Party wins the crowd over at the debates, but abruptly fires a previously incredulous Morty that had served as his campaign manager. Later, Campaign Manager Morty is approached by Investigator Rick, who delivers some secret files to him. At Candidate Morty's next rally, Campaign Manager Morty confronts and shoots him.

=== Mortytown ===
In a subplot paying homage to Training Day, idealistic new recruit Cop Rick is partnered with a cynical, corrupt Cop Morty who harbors anti-Morty sentiments himself. The pair are called to a ghetto of "Rickless" Mortys called Mortytown to investigate a possible drug lab, where Cop Rick kills a member of the Mortytown Locos gang in self-defense. Cop Morty comforts Cop Rick and the two begin to bond, however Cop Morty then detonates the drug lab to destroy the entire building, with the arrested gang members still inside. They meet with drug lord "Big Morty", who offers Cop Rick a bribe which Cop Morty himself has already accepted, but Cop Rick refuses and a shootout ensues. In the final standoff, Cop Morty expresses regret over leaving his life as a teenager behind in favor of the Citadel, before executing Big Morty and turning his gun on Cop Rick. Cop Rick kills him then surrenders to the arriving police, dejectedly commenting on how destructive Ricks are to Mortys.

=== Stand by Morty ===
The students of Morty Academy are told they will soon graduate and be assigned a new Rick. Upon hearing this, a group of Mortys led by the rebellious Slick Morty decide to search for the mythical Wishing Portal. At the Wishing Portal the next day, they decide to sacrifice something important in order to make their wishes come true, which each of them, bar Slick, immediately do. Slick, expressing a wish for life to change for Mortys, throws himself into the portal — which is then revealed to be a trash disposal. (Note: In the commentary track for the episode, Justin Roiland stated that Slick Morty survived by landing on a heap of garbage.)

=== Simple Rick's ===
At a factory producing Simple Rick's Wafers, flavored with positive neurochemicals from the titular Simple Rick's memories, employee Rick J-22 is passed over for a promotion. J-22 goes on a rampage, destroying his assembly machine, killing his former supervisor and taking Simple Rick hostage. A SWAT team of Ricks attempts to trick J-22 with a sabotaged portal device, leading to the death of Simple Rick, but are stopped from apprehending him by the factory's owner, Rick D. Sanchez III, who commends J-22 for his courage and frees him. As J-22 is overwhelmed with emotion on being recognized as a hero, Sanchez III stuns him and uses his happiness as a replacement for the wafers' flavor.

=== Epilogue ===
A pair of Secret Service Ricks execute Campaign Manager Morty via airlock while discussing Candidate Morty's survival and subsequent close victory as the first democratically-elected President of the Citadel. Rick D. Sanchez III takes his place with the plutocratic Shadow Council of Ricks as President Morty settles into his new position, before killing every member of the council who opposes him. Cop Rick is cleared of all charges due to the changes in administration, while the student Mortys learn that their assignment to a new Rick has been cancelled, which they believe to be Slick's wish coming true. The space outside the Citadel airlocks is shown to be choked with corpses, alongside Campaign Manager Morty's documents revealing the new President to be the Eyepatch Morty from "Close Rick-counters of the Rick Kind".

In a post-credits scene, the main Rick and Morty return home from Atlantis, satisfied with their trip. Rick confidently asserts that the events at the Citadel will have no effect on their own lives.

== Awards ==
The episode won writers Guterman and Ridley the 2018 Annie Award for Outstanding Achievement, Writing – TV/Broadcast Production.
