= Sola Digital Arts =

Japanese animation studio

Sola Digital Arts Inc.
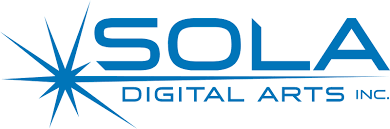

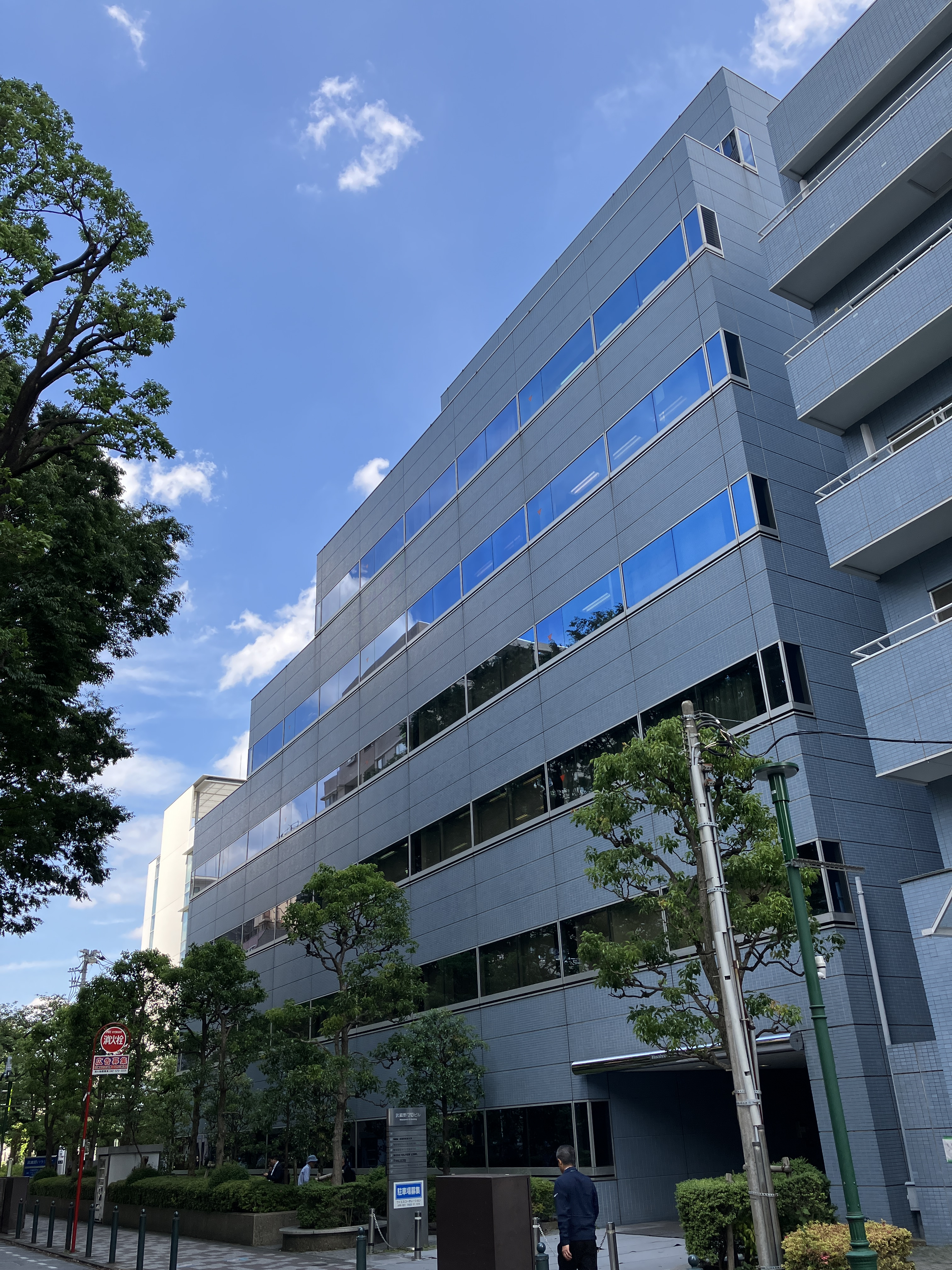
- Headquarters in Musashino, Tokyo
- Native name: 株式会社SOLA DIGITAL ARTS
- Romanized name: Kabushiki-gaisha Sora Dejitaru Ātsu
- Type: Kabushiki gaisha
- Industry: Anime, film, ONA, video game
- Founded: 2009; 17 years ago
- Headquarters: Main Office: Nakacho, Musashino, Tokyo, Japan; U.S. Office: Manhattan Beach, California, U.S.
- Key people: Joseph Chou (CEO); Shinji Aramaki (CCO, Director); Tomisaburou Hashimoto (COO, Director); Makiko Nagano (CFO)
- Net income: ¥10,000,000
- Owner: Sola Entertainment
- Number of employees: 80 (as of October 2019)
- Website: sola-digital.com (animation); sola-ent.com (production)

Sola Digital Arts Inc. (Japanese: 株式会社SOLA DIGITAL ARTS, Hepburn: Kabushiki-gaisha Sora Dejitaru Ātsu) is a Japanese animation studio founded in 2009 by former ADV Films producer Joseph Chou, who is the CEO.

The studio specializes in CGI. The studio became an animation division of the newly formed Sola Entertainment production management company in 2017.

== Animation works ==
=== Television series ===
Title	Network	First run start date	First run end date	Eps	Note(s)	Ref(s)
Blade Runner: Black Lotus	Adult Swim (Toonami)	November 14, 2021	February 6, 2022	13	Based on the Blade Runner franchise	

=== OVAs/ONAs ===
- Evangelion:Another Impact (2015)
- Ultraman (2019–2023, with Production I.G)
- Ghost in the Shell: SAC_2045 (2020–2022, with Production I.G)
- Samurai & Shogun (2020)
- Rick and Morty vs. Genocider (2020)
- Summer Meets God (Rick Meets Evil) (2021)
- The Great Yokai Battle of Akihabara (2021)
- Samurai & Shogun Part 2 (2021)

=== Films ===
- Starship Troopers: Invasion (2012)
- Appleseed Alpha (2014)
- Starship Troopers: Traitor of Mars (2017)
- Ghost in the Shell: SAC_2045 Sustainable War (2021, with Production I.G)
- The Lord of the Rings: The War of the Rohirrim (2024)

=== Video games ===
- Tekken 7 opening movie (2015)
- Shin Godzilla special demo contents for PlayStation VR (2016)
- Argyle Shift VR Attraction (2016)
- Elden Ring storyboards for the event scenes within the game (2022)

== Sola Entertainment ==
=== Production works ===
- Tower of God (2020)
- The God of High School (2020, associate producer)
- Shenmue: The Animation (2022)
- Ninja Kamui (2024)
- The Lord of the Rings: The War of the Rohirrim (2024)
- Rick and Morty: The Anime (2024)
- Lazarus (2025)
- Rooster Fighter (2026, associate producer)
- Joker: Laugh Riot (TBA)

== See also ==
- A.D. Vision
- Sentai Filmworks
- Sentai Studios
