= Yōhei Tadano =

Japanese actor and voice actor

- 多田野 曜平
- Born: March 10, 1962 (age 64); Kitakyushu, Fukuoka Prefecture, Japan
- Occupations: Actor; voice actor
- Years active: 1985–present
- Height: 160 cm (5 ft 3 in)

Yōhei Tadano (多田野 曜平, Tadano Yōhei; born March 10, 1962) is a Japanese actor and voice actor from Fukuoka Prefecture, Japan.

== Biography ==
Tadano's interest in acting began in his elementary school years. In 1981, while studying at the University of the Ryukyus, he joined the production "Audience Seats" at the Okinawa Jean Jean festival. After graduating from college, he worked most immediately as a salesman, but later became involved with a series of theater companies. Tadano joined the Theater Echo Training Institute in 1988, and two years later became a research student at the same entity. He was named a troupe member in April 1994 and was further promoted in April 2000.

Tadano is currently active mainly on stage and in voice-over work. On February 27, 2019, he became Kitakyushu City's Tourism Ambassador.

His first voice-over assignment was in 1993 with the Japanese-language dubbing of the American film The Saint of Fort Washington. Dubbing assignments for western movies continued for some time, but from 2006 Tadano expanded into anime, first for Hime-sama Goyōjin.

For the 2009 TV dub of For a Few Dollars More, which restored scenes deleted from the 1973 theatrical cut, he was cast as Manco, replacing the late Yasuo Yamada. A dubbing staff member heard Tadano's performance in Hime-sama Goyōjin and said, "There's a guy who sounds like Lupin!", referring to Yamada's celebrated role. Tadano also dubbed Eastwood in restored scenes for the Japanese TV dub of The Good, the Bad and the Ugly as well.

He portrays characters ranging from young to old. He voiced Nucky Thompson in Boardwalk Empire and also performed as the comical villain King Candy in Wreck-It Ralph, Heinz Doofenshmirtz in Phineas and Ferb and Mr. Smee in Jake and the Never Land Pirates.

Since his face physically resembles Tadao Futami, a senior member of a well-known theater company, Tadano took on the stage role of Futami. Because his voice shares some similarities with Yasuo Yamada, a senior troupe member, Tadano often substitutes for Yamada when required.

When Ichirō Nagai died in 2014, Tadano was called on to assume Nagai's role of Yoda in Star Wars Rebels. In Kingdom Hearts III, he also replaced Kaneta Kimotsuki in his role as Jiminy Cricket. Tadano additionally has also served as a replacement for Takeshi Aono.

== Filmography ==
=== Anime ===
- Naruto: Shippūden (2010) as Chushin
- Kamiwaza Wanda (2016) as Jii Yoda
- Little Witch Academia (2017) as Mr. Holbrooke
- One Piece (2017) as Prodi, (2024) as Vegapunk
- Layton Mystery Tanteisha: Katori no Nazotoki File (2018) as Darjeeling Aspoirot
- Megalobox (2018) as Miyagi
- Go Astro Boy Go! (2019) as Professor Ochanomizu
- Star Twinkle PreCure (2019) as Ryoutarou Sorami and Yeti
- BNA: Brand New Animal (2020) as Giuliano Flip
- Great Pretender (2020) as Kudo
- Samurai & Shogun (2020) as Rick Sanchez WTM-72
- Dragon Quest: The Adventure of Dai (2020) as Baduck
- Rick and Morty vs. Genocider (2020) as Rick Sanchez
- Yu-Gi-Oh! Sevens (2020) as Sebastian
- Log Horizon: Destruction of the Round Table (2021) as Regan
- Summer Meets God (Rick Meets Evil) (2021) as Rick Sanchez
- Beyblade Burst Dynamite Battle (2021) as Jingemon Daikokuten
- Getter Robo Arc (2021) as Professor Shikishima
- The Great Yokai Battle of Akihabara (2021) as Rick Sanchez
- Samurai & Shogun Part 2 (2021) as Rick Sanchez WTM-72
- Rick and Morty: The Anime (2024–present) as Rick Sanchez
- Zombie Land Saga: Yumeginga Paradise (2025) as Tsuneyuki Sano
- The Ghost in the Shell (2026) as Foreign Minister Hidaka

=== Video games ===
- Street Fighter IV (2008) – Gen
- Super Street Fighter IV (2010) – Gen
- Ni no Kuni: Wrath of the White Witch (2011) – Abull
- Shin Megami Tensei IV (2013) – Hugo
- Street Fighter V (2016) – Gen
- Dragon Quest Heroes II (2016) – King Felnorc
- Nioh (2017) – Kanbei Kuroda, Muramasa Senji
- Shin Megami Tensei: Strange Journey Redux (2017) – Captain Jack
- Kingdom Hearts III (2019) – Jiminy Cricket, Aliens
- Yakuza: Like a Dragon (2020) – Nonomiya
- Final Fantasy VII Remake (2020) – Don Corneo
- Ghost of Tsushima (2020) – Ryuzo
- Final Fantasy VII Remake (2024) – Bugenhagen

unknown date

- God of War III – Hermes
- God of War – Mímir

=== Tokusatsu ===
- Kamen Rider Den-O - Whale Imagin
- Kamen Rider Gavv - Dente Stomach

=== Dubbing roles ===
==== Live-action ====
- Clint Eastwood
  - A Fistful of Dollars (2012 Blu-Ray additional scenes), Man with No Name
  - For a Few Dollars More (2009 DVD additional scenes), Man with No Name
  - The Good, the Bad and the Ugly (2009 DVD additional scenes), Man with No Name
  - Where Eagles Dare (2021 Movie Plus additional scenes), Lieutenant Morris Schaffer
  - The Beguiled (2017 VOD edition), Corporal John 'McBee' McBurney
  - Dirty Harry (2012 Wowow additional scenes), Inspector Harry Callahan
  - Magnum Force (2012 Wowow additional scenes), Inspector Harry Callahan
  - The Enforcer (2012 Wowow additional scenes), Inspector Harry Callahan
  - The Gauntlet (2018 Wowow additional scenes), Detective Ben Shockley
  - Sudden Impact (2012 Wowow additional scenes), Inspector Harry Callahan
  - The Mule, Earl Stone
  - Cry Macho, Mike Milo
- Willem Dafoe
  - The Great Wall, Sir Ballard
  - Aquaman, Nuidis Vulko
  - Motherless Brooklyn, Paul Randolph
  - Togo, Leonhard Seppala
  - The Last Thing He Wanted, Richard Dick McMahon
  - Zack Snyder's Justice League, Nuidis Vulko
  - Nosferatu, Prof. Albin Eberhart von Franz
- Steve Buscemi
  - The Sopranos, Tony Blundetto
  - Boardwalk Empire, Enoch "Nucky" Thompson
  - Electric Dreams, Ed Morris
  - The Death of Stalin, Nikita Khrushchev
  - Hubie Halloween, Walter Lambert
- Aladdin, Iago (Alan Tudyk)
- Alice Through the Looking Glass, Gentleman Fish (Edward Petherbridge)
- Alvin and the Chipmunks: Chipwrecked, Ian Hawke (David Cross)
- The A-Team, H. M. "Howling Mad" Murdock (Sharlto Copley)
- Black & White: The Dawn of Justice, Xu Da-fu (Huang Bo)
- The Boondock Saints II: All Saints Day, Romeo (Clifton Collins Jr.)
- Burlesque, Alexis (Alan Cumming)
- The Captain, Reinhard Freitag (Milan Peschel)
- Captain America: The First Avenger, Abraham Erskine (Stanley Tucci)
- Constantine (2008 TV Asahi edition), Beeman (Max Baker)
- Copshop, Anthony Lamb (Toby Huss)
- Disaster Movie, Calvin (Gary "G Thang" Johnson)
- Doctor Who, King James I (Alan Cumming)
- Dough and Dynamite, Jacques (Chester Conklin)
- The Extraordinary Adventures of Adèle Blanc-Sec, Justin de Saint-Hubert (Jean-Paul Rouve)
- Final Cut, Rémi (Romain Duris)
- Flypaper, Billy Ray 'Peanut Butter' McCloud (Tim Blake Nelson)
- Fright Night 2: New Blood, Peter Vincent (Sean Power)
- Game of Thrones, Stannis Baratheon (Stephen Dillane)
- Hachi: A Dog's Tale, Carl Boilins (Jason Alexander)
- Hannibal (Netflix edition), Dr. Cordell Doemling (Željko Ivanek)
- Home Alone 2: Lost in New York (2019 Wowow additional scenes), Harry (Joe Pesci)
- Home Alone 3 (2019 NTV edition), Earl Unger (David Thornton)
- I Am Sam (NTV edition), Ifty (Doug Hutchinson)
- The Illusionist, Josef Fischer (Eddie Marsan)
- Instinct, Dr. Dylan Reinhart (Alan Cumming)
- The Internship, Roger Chetty (Aasif Mandvi)
- Interstellar, TARS (Bill Irwin)
- Into the Blue, Bryce Dunn (Scott Caan)
- The Invention of Lying, Traffic Cop (Edward Norton)
- It Chapter One, Pennywise / It (Bill Skarsgård)
- It Chapter Two, Pennywise / It (Bill Skarsgård)
- John Wick: Chapter 3 - Parabellum, Elder (Saïd Taghmaoui)
- The Kick, Uncle Mam (Petchtai Wongkamlao)
- Kingdom of the Planet of the Apes, Koro (Neil Sandilands)
- Knuckles, Pachacamac (Christopher Lloyd)
- The Lady in the Van, Alan Bennett (Alex Jennings)
- The Last Mercenary, Alexandre (Alban Ivanov)
- Lovecraft Country, Montrose Freeman (Michael K. Williams)
- Mad Dogs, Gus (Romany Malco)
- Mad Max 2 (2015 Supercharger edition), The Gyro Captain (Bruce Spence)
- The Marine 3: Homefront, Eckert (Michael Eklund)
- Mary Poppins Returns, Séamus the Coachman Dog (Chris O'Dowd)
- Million Dollar Arm, Ash (Aasif Mandvi)
- Mojin: The Lost Legend, Wang Kaixuan (Huang Bo)
- Nicky Larson et le parfum de Cupidon, Gilbert Skippy (Julien Arruti)
- No Time to Die, Valdo Obruchev (David Dencik)
- North Face (2020 BS Tokyo edition), Edi Rainer (Georg Friedrich)
- Nurse Jackie, Eddie Walzer (Paul Schulze)
- O Brother, Where Art Thou?, George Nelson (Michael Badalucco)
- Ocean's 8, Lawrence (Richard Robichaux)
- Once Upon a Time, Jiminy Cricket / Dr. Archibald Hopper (Raphael Sbarge)
- Otis, Elmo Broth (Kevin Pollak)
- Oz the Great and Powerful, Knuck (Tony Cox)
- Paddington, Montgomery Clyde (Tim Downie)
- The Pale Horse, Zachariah Osborne (Bertie Carvel)
- Peter Rabbit, Banaman (Gareth Davies)
- Perfect Sense, James (Ewen Bremner)
- The Poseidon Adventure (BS-TBS edition), James Martin (Red Buttons)
- A Prairie Home Companion, Dusty (Woody Harrelson)
- Raw Deal (2021 Wowow additional scenes), Martin "The Hammer" Lamanski (Steven Hill)
- Red Dragon (TV Tokyo edition, non-credit), Ralph Mandy (Frank Whaley)
- Roofman, Mitch (Peter Dinklage)
- Run Boy Run, SS Officer (Rainer Bock)
- Santa et Cie, Santa (Alain Chabat)
- The Sessions, Mark O'Brien (John Hawkes)
- Seven Psychopaths, Charles "Charlie" Costello (Woody Harrelson)
- Shark Attack 3: Megalodon, Davies (Nikolai Sotirov)
- Snakehead Swamp, Chipmunk (Thomas Francis Murphy)
- The Take, Felix De La Pena (John Leguizamo)
- Terry Pratchett's The Colour of Magic, Rincewind (David Jason)
- The Texas Chainsaw Massacre 2, Chop Top (Bill Moseley)
- Thor: Love and Thunder, King Yakan (Stephen Curry)
- Three Christs, Joseph Cassel (Peter Dinklage)
- The Three Musketeers, Venetian Nobleman (Christian Oliver)
- Time Bandits (Blu-ray Disk 35th anniversary edition), Robert (Derek Deadman)
- Tooth Fairy, Duke (Brandon T. Jackson)
- Transformers: Revenge of the Fallen, Mudflap (Reno Wilson)
- Transformers: The Last Knight, Hot-Rod (Omar Sy)
- The Undeclared War, John Yeabsley (Mark Rylance)
- Walk Hard: The Dewey Cox Story, Sam McPherson (Tim Meadows)
- Where the Wild Things Are, Douglas (Chris Cooper)
- White Collar, Mozzie (Willie Garson)
- Yes Man, Nick Lane (John Michael Higgins)

==== Animation ====
- The Addams Family 2 (Mr. Mustela)
- The Adventures of Tintin (Mr. Crabtree)
- Arthur Christmas (Elf Aide)
- The Boss Baby (Francis E. Francis)
- Brave (Martin)
- Coco (Papá Julio)
- Ferdinand (Angus)
- Finding Dory (Bailey)
- Happy Feet Two (Lombardo)
- Home (Kyle)
- Meet the Robinsons (Carl)
- Moomins on the Riviera (Captain)
- Mr. Peabody & Sherman (Mr. Peabody)
- The Nut Job (Mole)
- ParaNorman (Judge Hopkins)
- Rango (Rattlesnake Jake, The Spirit of the West)
- Rick and Morty (Rick Sanchez)
- Shrek Forever After (Gnome Guide)
- Solar Opposites (Korvo)
- Soul (Jerry)
- Space Jam: A New Legacy (Rick Sanchez)
- Stillwater (Stillwater)
- The Stolen Princess (Chornomor)
- Wreck-It Ralph (King Candy / Turbo)
- Camp Lakebottom (Sawyer)
- Frozen (Duke Of Weselton)
- Harley Quinn (The Joker)
- Jimmy Two-Shoes (Lucius Heinous VII)
- Monsters University (Referee)
- My Little Pony: Friendship is Magic (Flam)
- Phineas and Ferb (Dr. Heinz Doofenshmirtz)
- Scaredy Squirrel (Paddy Patterson, Buck, Balsa Badger Burglar, Lars Von Stacking, Brian, Moogbar)
- Star Wars Rebels (Yoda)
- Star Wars: The Clone Wars (Cad Bane)
- Steven Universe (Greg Universe)
- Super Secret Secret Squirrel (Secret Squirrel)
- Toy Story 3 (Bookworm)
- Up (Nurse George)
- Wendell & Wild (Wendell)
- Zootopia (Duke Weaselton)
