= Rickdependence Spray =

- Rick and Morty episode
- Episode no.: Season 5 Episode 4
- Directed by: Erica Hayes
- Written by: Nick Rutherford
- Production code: RAM-505
- Original air date: July 11, 2021
- Running time: 22 minutes

Guest appearances
- Keith David as The President; Christina Ricci as Princess Ponietta / Kathy Ireland; Michelle Buteau as the Sperm Queen

Episode chronology
← Previous "A Rickconvenient Mort"	Next → "Amortycan Grickfitti"

"Rickdependence Spray" is the fourth episode of the fifth season of the American television series Rick and Morty. It premiered in the United States on July 11, 2021.

In the episode, Morty notices the hospital's horse breeding program at Beth's workplace, takes an interest in it, and gets a volunteer job at the equine hospital in order to use it to masturbate. A week later, Rick borrows a barrel of "horse semen" from the hospital to create a biological weapon to use on the underground race of cannibalistic horse people called "chuds" he and Morty are fighting. Due to the challenging plot lines, some suspected it to be a series of dares issued by or placed on the show's writer's room. The episode was not well received by critics and fans alike, and many criticized the plot as overly far-fetched and silly.

== Plot ==
While waiting for Beth to finish with her work, Morty finds a horse inseminator. Morty asks Beth if he could do a part job at her horse hospital after work which she agrees to. During which he masturbates with the inseminator.

Rick's attempt to make a bioweapon to use against an underground race of cannibalistic horse-people (the "Chuds") goes awry when he uses a barrel of horse semen in his experiment which, unbeknownst to Rick, also contains Morty's semen. The failed experiment results an explosion which unleashes a swarm of giant, mutated sperm that begin attacking and murdering humans.

Rick and Morty are sent by the president with a team of troops to destroy the sperm's nest. The team is killed, with the exception of Rick and Morty. The Sperm Queen uses Morty to create more sperm monsters before they are rescued by a friendly sperm Morty named Sticky.

Eventually a plan is devised and set in motion by the president to lure the mutated sperm with an enlarged, human egg harvested from Summer. However, unknown to everyone who contributed to the plan, the sperm originated from Morty. After Morty confesses the truth and everybody realizes that they are about to create a "giant incest baby", the President orders his forces to defend the egg from the sperm at all costs.

Rick, Morty, and Sticky are captured by the Chuds and are about to be eaten. However, the Chud king's daughter, Princess Poneta, reveals Rick got her pregnant. This leads the Chuds to help the humans in stopping the sperm.

Sticky unexpectedly breaches the egg, fertilizing it. The President, who forbids outright destroying the egg for political reasons, instead has it launched into space. Poneta then gives birth to Rick's fowl revealing they are independent once born and leaves Rick.

In the post credits scene, an astronaut is grabbed by Summer and Morty's giant incest baby.

== Production ==
=== Development and writing ===
The script for "Rickdependence Spray" was written by staff writer Nick Rutherford, marking his second official writing credit for the series following the fourth-season episode "One Crew over the Crewcoo's Morty." The episode was directed by series regular Erica Hayes, while the internal production tracking code assigned to the asset block was RAM-505.

According to series co-creator Dan Harmon and writer Nick Rutherford, the concept for the narrative originated in the writers' room as an intentional creative challenge to push the boundaries of network television standards using an inherently absurd, single-minded premise. The creative team aimed to construct a high-stakes, classic action-movie narrative structure that was completely driven by an incredibly vulgar, low-brow inciting incident, exploring the juxtaposition between cinematic gravity and toilet humor. Writer Nick Rutherford later noted that the team intentionally leaned into a "disgusting and tasteless" concept to test the limits of the animated medium.

=== Cultural references and parodies ===
The episode relies heavily on satirical pastiches, homages, and narrative tropes borrowed from 1980s and 1990s science fiction and blockbuster action cinema. The primary title is a direct comedic play on the 1996 alien invasion blockbuster film Independence Day. The subterranean, cannibalistic horse-humanoid race known as the "Chuds" acts as a structural and nominal nod to the 1984 underground horror cult classic film C.H.U.D. Additionally, the closing sequence featuring the floating, cosmic humanoid fetus in Earth's orbit is framed as a direct visual parody of the famous "Star Child" imagery from the conclusion of Stanley Kubrick's 1968 science fiction film 2001: A Space Odyssey.

== Reception ==
The episode was ranked as the series' worst episode by critic Kayla Cobb of Decider.
