= Morty Smith =

Fictional character

Morty C. Smith
- Rick and Morty character
- First appearance: Morty Smith Prime: "Promo Commercial #1" (2013); Morty C-132: "The Wubba Lubba Dub Dub of Wall Street" (2015); "Evil Morty" 79⊢⊇V: "Close Rick-counters of the Rick Kind" (2014); Space Morty: "Girl Who Manipulates Time" (2024)
- Last appearance: Morty C-132: "Head-Space" (2016); Space Morty: "A Pain in the Back" (2024)
- Created by: Justin Roiland; Dan Harmon
- Designed by: Justin Roiland
- Inspired by: Marty McFly by: Robert Zemeckis; Bob Gale
- Voiced by: Justin Roiland (2013–2022); Harry Belden (2023–present); Keisuke Chiba (Japanese dub; Rick and Morty: The Anime); Gabriel Regojo (English dub; The Anime); Michael Cusack (Bushworld Adventures)
- Portrayed by: Jaeden Martell (interstitials)

In-universe information
- Full name: Mortimer Chauncey Smith Sr.
- Nickname: Morty
- Species: Human
- Gender: Male
- Title(s): Morty Prime; Sir Mortanial (Morty the Molten)
- Occupation: Student; King of the Sun
- Affiliation: The Vindicators; Knights of the Sun
- Weapon: Lightsaber (season 6)
- Family: Rick Sanchez (grandfather); Jerry Smith (father); Beth Smith (mother); Space Beth (mother); Summer Smith (sister); Hemorrhage (ex-brother-in-law); CHUD heir (half-uncle); Leonard Smith (grandfather); Joyce Smith (grandmother); Diane Sanchez (grandmother)
- Spouses: Brides of Morty (vol. 8); Noelle Goldenfold (vol. 13–14); Elle Smith (The Anime)
- Significant others: Jessica (season 5, 7); Annie (season 1); Daphna (vol. 1); Stacy (season 3); Jacqueline (season 3); Princess Decoria (vol. 6); Spare Parts Morty (vol. 6); Morty's girlfriend (season 4); Planetina (season 5)
- Children: Morty Smith Jr. (son); Thoolie Smith (son); Naruto Smith (son-nephew); Sperm monsters (children); Maria Smith (daughter)
- Home: United States, Earth: Parmesan Dimension (seasons 6–present); Dimension C-131 (seasons 1–6); Prime Dimension (season 1; originally)
- Nationality: American
- Age: 14

Mortimer Chauncey Smith Sr. is the titular co-protagonist of the American animated television series Rick and Morty. Created by Justin Roiland and Dan Harmon, and voiced by the former for the first six seasons of the series, followed by Harry Belden beginning with the seventh season, Morty is a 14-year-old boy loosely inspired by Michael J. Fox's Marty McFly from Back to the Future. Morty is known for his awkward, anxious, second-guessing, doubtful personality, and low sense of self-esteem; the character has been critically well received. He is the good-natured and impressionable grandson of Rick Sanchez, the son of Jerry and Beth Smith, the younger brother of Summer Smith, and the father of Morty Jr., Thoolie, Naruto, and Maria Smith. He is also known to be easily manipulated. In September 2021, Jaeden Martell portrayed Morty in a series of promotional interstitials for the series.

An inter-dimensional traveller, several alternate versions of Morty from across the multiverse have appeared throughout the franchise. Although initially referring to himself as "Morty C-137" in reference to the designation given to his grandfather by the Trans-Dimensional Council of Ricks, in reference to Rick's original universe, "C-137", in "Rickmurai Jack", Rick is revealed to not be Morty's original Rick, with Morty's true reality designation, Morty Prime, being revealed in the audio commentary for "Solaricks". Book 1 of the Oni Press Rick and Morty comic series (comprising the first two volumes of the series) follows the Rick and Morty of Dimension C-132 (until their deaths in the "Head-Space" arc) while most issues of subsequent installments follow the Rick (C-137) and Morty (Prime) of the television series; the video game Pocket Mortys follows the Rick and Morty of Dimension C-123 who capture numerous alternate versions of Morty, including girl counterparts Morticia and Mortabel, while various other Mortys are the focus of episodes set in the inter-dimensional Citadel of Ricks and Mortys, ruled by President Morty of Dimension 79⊢⊇V, colloquially known as "Evil Morty" among fans and the media until the series' fifth season, where this name was officially adopted, whose origin story is explored in the seventh season episode "Unmortricken". The character has received a positive critical reception.

== Characterization ==
Inverse's Corey Plante commented that Morty's moral outrage is the basis of many storylines, contrasting with Rick's nihilism. Morty sees morality at a surface level, but his interventions cause disaster and lead to him committing extreme acts of violence. For instance, in "Mortynight Run", Morty rescues a being from assassination but is forced to kill it after discovering that it intends to destroy all carbon-based life.

== Biography ==
=== Season 1 ===
In the first season of the series, Morty Smith of the Prime Dimension (Morty Prime) is 14-years-old and is a student at Harry Herpson High School along with his older sister Summer. Morty seems to be suffering from anxiety and is easily stressed, largely as a result of traumatic experiences during his adventures with Rick. He is often dismissed as idiotic by Rick and others but is shown to be wiser than his grandfather in terms of understanding people's feelings and is capable of explosive anger and moral outrage in objection to Rick's attitude and actions. In "Rick Potion #9", Morty is forced to abandon his original dimension (the Prime Dimension) and family for Dimension C-131 (where versions of him and Rick have just died) after a "love potion" Rick made for Morty mutated with the common cold, while in "Raising Gazorpazorp", Morty's use of a sex robot with a "built-in baby-maker" results in him siring a half-alien son, Morty Junior, who grows to maturity within the day before going on to write a best-selling book about Morty's raising of him entitled My (Horrible) Father.

=== Seasons 2–6 ===
In "A Rickle in Time", Morty, Summer, and Rick spend six months repairing their house and screwing around with time frozen after the events of "Ricksy Business". In "Mort Dinner Rick Andre", Morty dates Jessica, in "Rickdependence Spray", Morty sires a second son, later named Naruto Smith, as a result of an experiment gone wrong, and in "A Rickconvenient Mort", Morty dates Planetina.

=== Season 7 ===
In "Rickfending Your Mort", Morty is revealed to have begun casually dating Jessica again.

=== The Anime ===
In "A Pain in the Back", while mourning the death of his new girlfriend Elle, Morty inadvertently gets his mind trapped in an alternate reality where Elle didn't die, moving at faster speed than his own, with Morty proceeding to marry Elle and have a daughter with her, Maria (who becomes a famous violinist), while also considering an offer to have an affair with a man named Frank he once inspired. On dying as an adult in this dimension, Morty's mind is transported back into his teenage self.

=== Comic series ===
Morty Prime appears as a main character in several Oni Press Rick and Morty comic series story arcs, as well as the spin-off series Rick and Morty Presents and various limited series; in Rick and Morty vs. Cthulhu, Morty sleeps with Cthulhu's daughter Cathy and has a third son, Thoolie.

== Other versions ==
=== Evil Morty ===
An inter-dimensional traveller and former President of the Citadel of Ricks and Mortys, "Evil Morty" of Dimension 79⊢⊇V who took control of his Rick with a mind control eyepatch as part of a plot to escape the Central Finite Curve, a barrier that separates other universes from the ones where Rick is the smartest person in their respective universe. He would eventually succeed in both destroying the Citadel and the Central Finite Curve where he would move out into the multiverse.

=== Citadel of Ricks and Mortys ===
The Citadel of Ricks and Mortys is an inter-dimensional society populated almost exclusively by alternate versions of Rick and Morty from across the multiverse, founded by Rick C-137, and later ruled by the Trans-Dimensional Council of Ricks, the Shadow Council of Ricks, and President Morty (Evil Morty). Notable Morty residents include:

- Mortipper and Mortabel Pines–Smith – Identical twin boy and girl composite versions of Morty and the Pines twins Dipper and Mabel from Gravity Falls, they are introduced as background characters in "Close Rick-counters of the Rick Kind" as Easter egg cameos, before subsequently being named by Gravity Falls creator Alex Hirsch in April 2017, and featured as playable characters Pocket Mortys. After the duo cameoed again in "The Ricklantis Mixup", Mortabel returned on her own in the Gravity Falls: Lost Legends storyline Don't Dimension It by Hirsch and Serina Hernandez; in the storyline, she is depicted as one of the many alternate versions of Mabel trapped in a pocket dimension with the "Mabels of the Multiverse", who join the primary reality Mabel in confronting the Anti-Mabel. Mortabel is next seen in Rick C-137's "crybaby" backstory flashback in "Rickmurai Jack", in which a younger Rick C-137 had stolen technology from Mortabel's own grandfather, as she had been exiting their family's garage along with her and Mortipper's sister Summer, and is not present on the Citadel when it is destroyed.
- Campaign Manager Morty – The campaign manager of Candidate (later President) Morty, who is fired before failing to assassinate his former boss.
- Cop Morty – An obese and corrupt police officer who harbors anti-Morty sentiment, and is partnered with a Rookie Rick.
- Big Morty – A drug lord who runs a portion of the criminal underworld of Mortytown.
- The students of Morty Academy – Mortys whose Ricks either died or abandoned them, who are attending the school ahead of being assigned new Ricks. The day before graduation, a group of Mortys led by Slick Morty search for the mythical Wishing Portal. On finding it, they decide to sacrifice something important in order to make their wishes come true. Slick, expressing a wish for life to change for Mortys, throws himself into the portal — actually a trash disposal.
- Judge Morty – A judge at the Citadel who has his own courtroom television show, with a version of Summer serving as his bailiff. First appearing in an "animatic scene" in August 2016, he made his official debut in Pocket Mortys and the 2018 comic "Morty Court".

==== Pocket Mortys ====
The main plot of Pocket Mortys follows Morty C-123 and his Rick, based on the Citadel, as they embark on a Pokémon-inspired challenge where Rick catches various 'wild' Mortys in other dimensions, battling them with a variety of 'Trainers' in the form of Ricks, aliens, and several supporting characters. Hundreds of Mortys are made available as playable characters in the game, including every Morty to appear in the television/comic series, and numerous original Mortys, including Multi Morty (based on Junji Ito's Tomie), Mindy "Morticia", from a dimension where Morty was born a girl, and Roller Derby Morty, a Morty who is a trans girl, all of whom are later featured in the comic book series Rick and Morty: Pocket Like You Stole It!.

=== Morty C-132 ===
One of the two main protagonists of the first three volumes of the Oni Press Rick and Morty comic series, the Morty of Dimension C-132 assists Rick in using time crystals to win at the stock market in The Wubba Lubba Dub Dub of Wall Street. In Head-Space, in a parody of Dune, following an alien invasion whose army give themselves up to Morty C-132 due to an ancient prophecy, he becomes the Morty'Dyb, the ruler of their galactic empire (based on Leto and Paul Atreides). 180 years later, Morty C-132 grows tired of his rulership and the immortality it has provided his family, as Rick (the QuasRick Haderach) leads a rebellion against him. At the conclusion of the storyline, both Rick and Morty C-132 are killed, and their universe destroyed, before the arc pivots to Rick C-137 and Morty Prime (the protagonists of the Rick and Morty television series, and most subsequent volumes of the comic series) who had been watching recordings of their memories as a "movie" from within their C-132 counterparts' now-severed heads.

=== Dictator Morty ===
In the comic series arc The Rickfinity Crisis, a facially scarred Dictator Morty is revealed to be in command of Universe 304-X, a reality upon the Central Finite Curve where Rick Sanchez was never born, having fled there away from his own abusive Rick. After being convinced to stand-down by his Summer, both are accidentally killed by their Jerry driving a tank.

=== Clone Morty ===
The protagonist of Rick and Morty: Virtual Rick-ality, Clone Morty, also known as Spare Parts Morty, is a clone of Morty grown both to help Rick and Morty with menial tasks, and to provide organs should Morty ever need any. Spare Parts Morty returns in the comic series arc Some Morty to Love, where after Morty finds himself with two dates to high school dance — Jessica and the Martian Princess Decoria — Rick awakens Spare Parts Morty (one of three Morty clones living under the house) to bring Jessica to the dance, while Morty attends with Decoria. After the dance, on losing their dates, both Mortys are implied to have a sexual encounter on returning home.

=== Worst Morty ===
In the comic series arc The Rickoning, in Dimension C-130 "just the next universe over from" the one Rick C-137 is currently residing in (C-131), the "Worst Morty" convinces his Rick to buy him the Hollaluog, an all-powerful impregnable armored suit and the "greatest weapon of war ever devised", using it on numerous adventures before he is kidnapped without it by Peacock Jones, who kidnaps Morty and brainwashes him into attempting to kill Rick, before a bomb from the IllumiRicki drops into their garage. After being cured and going with Rick to kill the IllumiRicki, Morty and Rick return in an unsuccessful attempt to deactivate the bomb, which goes off, killing them and destroying their universe. In Rick and Morty Go to Hell, the Rick and Morty of The Rickoning find themselves in Hell; not remembering how they died, Morty proceeds to find the Devil in an attempt to make a deal with him, before Rick unwittingly kills the Devil and takes his place, using his powers to recreate the universe within Hell, allowing Morty to live a normal life before Rick returns to Hell to reluctantly rule forever.

The Rickoning also features Mortary, an alternate version of Morty who runs the inter-dimensional superstore Brick and Mortary with his business partner Brick, who sell weapons to other Ricks and Mortys.

=== Decoy Mortys ===
In "Mortyplicity", numerous robotic "decoy" versions of the Smith family are revealed to have been built by Rick and spread across America (the real Rick having built a single decoy family, who proceeded to build their own decoys), including numerous versions of Morty who with the rest of his family in an "Asimov cascade" proceed to kill each other, before the real Morty and his family return to Earth.

=== Grandpa Morty ===
Over the two-part comic series arc The Space Shake Saga, a divergent version of Morty Prime (from Dimension C-129) forms a romance with Noelle Goldenfold, whom he eventually marries and has three children with; by the age of 85, Morty and Noelle have many grandchildren, including: Jackson-X Smith, Timmy "Da Ghoul" Smith, Crumbles Smith, and Itchy Smith, to whom Morty is known as Grandpa Morty.

=== Space Morty ===
In Rick and Morty: The Anime, Morty Prime learns of the legacy of Space Morty (voiced by Keisuke Chiba and Gabriel Regojo), an offshoot version of himself who had teamed up with Alien Elle to defeat the Galactic Federation, becoming a hero and rebel leader known galaxy-wide, before he was shot to death.

=== Miscellaneous ===
Further alternate versions of Morty appear in the web series Rick and Morty: The Non-Canonical Adventures (2016–2021).

== Development ==
The character was created by Justin Roiland and Dan Harmon, who first met at Channel 101 during the early 2000s. In 2006, Roiland created The Real Animated Adventures of Doc and Mharti, an animated short parodying the Back to the Future characters Doc Brown and Marty McFly, and the precursor to Rick and Morty. The idea for Rick and Morty, in the form of Doc and Mharti was brought up to Adult Swim, and the ideas for a family element and Rick being a grandfather to Morty were developed.

Morty was voiced by Justin Roiland for the first six seasons of Rick and Morty and promotional material, while Harry Belden voices the character from the seventh season onward.

In September 2021, Jaeden Martell portrayed Morty Smith in a series of promotional interstitials, directed by Paul B. Cummings, alongside Christopher Lloyd as Rick Sanchez.

== In other media ==
=== Guest appearances ===
Morty Smith appears in the couch gag of the 2015 The Simpsons episode "Mathlete's Feat", cloning a new Simpson family after accidentally killing the previous one.

Morty Smith cameos in the 2021 film Space Jam: A New Legacy, restraining the Tasmanian Devil before leaving him in the hands of LeBron James and the TuneSquad. In the 2023 episode "Rickfending Your Mort", this Morty and his Rick are revealed to have been mercy killed by Rick C-137.

=== Video games ===
In the Fortnite Battle Royale Chapter 2 Season 7 Battle Pass, Morty appears as a pickaxe that is modeled after an alternate version of him called "Hammerhead Morty", which appeared in multiple episodes in the show. In August 2021, he became available as an outfit, named "Mecha Morty".

In October 2022, Morty was added as a playable character in the fighting game MultiVersus.

== Reception ==
The character has received an overall positive reception. VerbStomp described Morty as "Perhaps the picture of childhood innocence, or perhaps the product of parental neglect. Morty is unintelligent, skittish [...] and distressed, likely due to his traumatic experiences while venturing into new worlds with Rick."

=== Accolades and nominations ===
Year	Award	Category	Nominee(s)	Result	Ref.
2015	BTVA Voice Acting Awards	Best Male Lead Vocal Performance in a Television Series — Comedy/Musical	Justin Roiland	Won	
2016	BTVA Voice Acting Awards	Best Male Lead Vocal Performance in a Television Series	Justin Roiland	Nominated	
2017	IGN Awards	Best Comedic TV Performance	Justin Roiland	Won	
2021	Critics' Choice Super Awards	Best Voice Actor in an Animated Series	Justin Roiland	Nominated	
