= Rest and Ricklaxation =

- Rick and Morty episode
- Episode no.: Season 3 Episode 6
- Directed by: Anthony Chun
- Written by: Tom Kauffman
- Editing by: Lee Harting; Matthew Sipple
- Original air date: August 27, 2017
- Running time: 22 minutes

Guest appearances
- Tara Strong as Stacy and Holly Hooks; Tom Kenny as Tour Guide; Maurice LaMarche as a waiter; Cassie Steele as Tricia Lange

Episode chronology
← Previous "The Whirly Dirly Conspiracy"	Next → "The Ricklantis Mixup"
- Rick and Morty (season 3)

"Rest and Ricklaxation" is the sixth episode of the third season of the American science fiction television series Rick and Morty. The episode is written by Tom Kauffman and directed by Anthony Chun, aired on Adult Swim on August 27, 2017. Chris Parnell does not appear as main character Jerry Smith in the episode.

== Plot ==
After a six-day outer space adventure that leaves them on the verge of psychological collapse, Rick and Morty decide to spend some time at an alien spa, where they use a detox machine that extracts a person's negative personality traits. However, without Rick and Morty knowing, those traits are transposed into sentient toxic physical counterparts, characterized by Rick's arrogance and Morty's self-loathing, trapped in the machine's storage unit. On the other hand, the Clean Rick becomes more considerate, and Clean Morty's confidence soars, which makes him more popular and allows him to start dating girls. However, a side effect is that both Clean Rick and Morty effectively lose their ability to form emotional attachments. As a result, Clean Morty ruins a date with his crush Jessica and picks up another girl named Stacy instead.

Swearing revenge on Clean Rick, Toxic Rick tricks Clean Rick into bringing the storage tank back to Earth to switch places with them under the guise of remerging their personalities. The plan fails after Clean Morty refuses to be reaccept his toxic personality traits, with Toxic Rick and Toxic Morty getting released and Stacy getting trapped inside the machine. After fighting Clean Rick, he goes to his backup plan of using a moonlight tower to remake the whole Earth into a toxic version of itself.

Clean Rick reverts the situation by poisoning Toxic Morty, correctly deducing that the true Rick considered his compassion for Morty a weakness, meaning Toxic Rick has inherited that trait. Toxic Rick angrily merges with Clean Rick to save Toxic Morty, bringing back the true Rick. Clean Morty avoids merging back with his toxic counterpart and goes on to live a life as a stockbroker in New York City. Rick and Jessica track him down and restore order by re-injecting Toxic Morty back into Clean Morty. In the post-credits scene, a tour of the same moonlight tower releases a frightened Stacy, who having assumed the tank was a sex dungeon frantically shouts out the safeword "sea cucumber."

== Production ==
The title and release date were revealed on July 29, 2017 to be "Rest and Ricklaxation" and August 27, 2017. The episode's writing and directorial credits were announced upon the episode's airing. Morty's girlfriend in the episode, Stacy, is voiced by Tara Strong. Maurice LaMarche also voices a minor waiter character, and Cassie Steele voices recurring character Tricia Lange The A.V. Club noted that "Rest and Ricklaxation" was the first episode of the season to address Morty's "school life" and crush on Jessica.

== Reception ==
=== Viewing figures ===
The episode was viewed by 2.47 million Americans upon its airdate.

=== Critical response ===
IGN praised the work of the writers in making the plot unique and different, saying "Had this conflict boiled down to simple war between Good Rick and Evil Rick, I don't know how well this episode would have worked," noting as well that the "characterization took an abrupt turn midway through the episode when he switched from being a lovable self-help guru to a reject from Wall Street or American Psycho." Joe Matar of Den of Geek said, "The series explores a simple premise and comes out with another brilliant episode," in addition to praising the plot, calling the episode "another fantastic episode" that "somehow takes [the plot] in wholly unexpected directions, plunging the depths of the characters’ psyches and cranking out top-notch jokes all along the way." IndieWire called the theme of the episode poses the question: "Who are Rick and Morty without their problems? That’s the issue confronted in "Rest and Ricklaxation", as the legendary duo decide to unwind after a crazy adventure with a day spa that strips them of their 'toxins.'"
