= Close Rick-counters of the Rick Kind =

- Rick and Morty episode
- Episode no.: Season 1 Episode 10
- Directed by: Stephen Sandoval
- Written by: Ryan Ridley
- Original air date: April 7, 2014
- Running time: 22 minutes

Guest appearance
- Rob Paulsen as Snuffles

Episode chronology
← Previous "Something Ricked This Way Comes"	Next → "Ricksy Business"
- Rick and Morty season 1

"Close Rick-counters of the Rick Kind" is the tenth and penultimate episode of the first season of the American science fiction comedy animated television series Rick and Morty. Directed by Stephen Sandoval and written by Ryan Ridley, the episode aired on April 7, 2014. With a title alluding to the 1977 film Close Encounters of the Third Kind, the episode is notable for introducing both the rules of the franchise's multiverse and the series' main antagonist — "Evil Morty" — whose storyline is continued across the 2017 third season episode "The Ricklantis Mixup", the 2020 short film "Rick and Morty vs. Genocider", the 2021 fifth season finale "Rickmurai Jack", the 2023 seventh season episode "Unmortricken", and the 2026 ninth season premiere "There's Something About Morty".

A stand-alone sequel titled "A Tale of Two Jerries", was published in the comic book series in Rick and Morty, by Oni Press from 2016 to 2017.

== Plot ==
The Smith family is eating breakfast when an alternate "Evil" Rick (who has a facial scar) and his Morty (who wears an eyepatch) appear through a portal, kill Rick, and kidnap Morty.

The Smith family is again eating breakfast the next morning, revealing that the opening scene's family were themselves in another timeline. The show's original Rick is taken by alternate soldier versions of himself to the Citadel of Ricks, an interdimensional sanctuary for Ricks and Mortys from different timelines. Morty is at first impressed by the Citadel, but discovers that Mortys are somewhat commodified and treated as disposable by the other Ricks. The Trans-Dimensional Council of Ricks are biased against the show's original Rick, Rick C-137, for his loner nature. They wrongfully convict him of murdering twenty-seven Ricks from alternate dimensions and kidnapping their respective Mortys upon discovering incriminating evidence which was actually fabricated to frame him. Rick and Morty escape and are chased by a few duplicates of themselves. The C-137 Smith household is flooded with other Ricks; Jerry develops a friendship with the good-natured "Doofus Rick".

As Rick and Morty C-137 search for the killer, Morty learns that the reason all Ricks have a Morty is to conceal their genius brainwaves from outside detection; Morty's "complementary" brainwaves "cancel" his out. Morty becomes agitated with Rick, questioning their relationship. This is compounded when they discover the killer's base, a military compound constructed with an enormous number of constantly tortured Mortys in the walls for cloaking, and Rick is nonplussed. The "Evil" Rick and Morty capture them, "Evil" Rick taking Rick C-137 to have his brain downloaded. Morty C-137 leads a rebellion of alternate Mortys held prisoner in the base and releases Rick, spitefully saying that were he Rick he would not have. Rick informs the Council about the real killer, clearing his name. Morty continues to be upset with Rick; Rick refuses to apologize, but assuages Morty's anger by calling him the "Mortyest" of them all.

Soldier Ricks clean up the "Evil" Rick and Morty's base, directing the Morty prisoners to the Citadel as refugees. The soldier Ricks discover that "Evil" Rick, killed by the Mortys in the rebellion, was a mindless cyborg being controlled remotely. As the Morty prisoners board the refugee ships, "Evil" Morty removes his eyepatch — "Evil" Rick's controller — stomps on it, and blends into the crowd.

In the post-credits scene, Jerry waves at Doofus Rick from the window, prompting Rick to make fun of him.

== Reception ==
=== Viewing figures ===
Upon its airing, the episode was seen by 1.75 million American viewers.

=== Critical reception ===
Joe Matar of Den of Geek praised "Close Rick-counters of the Rick Kind", calling it "a really solid episode, both narratively and comically. Rick and Morty does some of its best comedic work when it gleefully indulges in the absurd possibilities that a sci-fi universe of limitless possibilities allows for. One of the consistently best ways Rick and Morty showcases its creativity is through chase scenes in which the characters go through all manners of sci-fi rigmarole, letting the writers and animators assault you with a barrage of blink-and-you-missed-it sight gags." Zack Handlen of The A.V. Club said "This is a show designed to answer any potential message board nitpicking in advance ... All of which makes the occasional moments of heart even more surprising and effective."

Corey Plante of Inverse thought the first season of Rick and Morty should have ended with "Close Rick-counters of the Rick Kind", with the reveal that Evil Rick's Morty was really Eyepatch Morty, a future series antagonist. Blaise Hopkins of TVOverMind praised the series' "ability to poke fun at the science fiction genre while keeping the design and comedy completely original."

== Follow-ups ==
=== Sequel episodes ===
Following the return and initial destruction of the Citadel in the 2017 third season premiere "The Rickshank Rickdemption", the storyline of "Evil Morty" is continued across the 2017 third season episode "The Ricklantis Mixup", and the 2021 fifth season finale "Rickmurai Jack", forming a trilogy in which the character comes to power over the Citadel, as well as the 2023 seventh season episode "Unmortricken".

=== Comic book sequel ===
A stand-alone sequel titled "A Tale of Two Jerries", was published in the comic book series in Rick and Morty, by Oni Press from 2016 to 2017.

=== Gravity Falls crossover ===
During a chase scene in the episode, Rick Sanchez opens numerous decoy portals, from one of which emerges a pen, a notepad, and a mug. These items would be dropped through the other end of the portal by Stan Pines in the closing moments of the Gravity Falls second season episode "Society of the Blind Eye", airing October 27, 2014, establishing the series as being set in the same multiverse.
