= Rick and Morty season 5 =

Rick and Morty
- Season 5
- Blu-ray cover
- Showrunner: Scott Marder
- Starring: Justin Roiland; Chris Parnell; Spencer Grammer; Sarah Chalke
- No. of episodes: 10

Release
- Original network: Adult Swim
- Original release: June 20 – September 5, 2021

Season chronology
- ← Previous; Season 4 Next → Season 6

The fifth season of the animated television series Rick and Morty consisted of 10 episodes, part of the 70 episodes ordered by Adult Swim after they renewed the series in 2018. The series stars Justin Roiland as both titular characters, alongside Chris Parnell as Jerry Smith, Spencer Grammer as Summer Smith, and Sarah Chalke as Beth Smith and Space Beth. The season premiered on June 20, 2021, and concluded on September 5, 2021.

== Cast and characters ==
=== Main ===
- Justin Roiland as Rick Sanchez C-137 and Morty Smith Prime, the show's two lead characters. Rick is often shown as drunk and Morty is shown as nervous and unsure of himself, often in doubt of Rick's many extravagant adventures.
- Chris Parnell as Jerry Smith, Morty and Summer's father and Rick's son-in-law.
- Spencer Grammer as Summer Smith, Morty's older sister and Rick's granddaughter.
- Sarah Chalke as Beth Smith, Morty and Summer's mother, Jerry's wife, and Rick's daughter.

=== Recurring ===
- Kari Wahlgren as:
  - Jessica, Morty's long-time crush whom he seldom has the courage to ask out.
  - The voice of Rick's Space Cruiser.
- Keith David as:
  - President Curtis.
  - The Turkey President, a turkey who is accidentally turned into a human visage of the President.

=== Guests ===
- Dan Harmon as:
  - Birdperson / Phoenixperson, Rick's best friend, previously transformed into a killing machine by his wife Tammy Gueterman.
  - Mr. Nimbus, Rick's long-time enemy introduced in the season.
  - The Arabic Ambassador, an ambassador to whom the Tina-Teers seek to sell Planetina.
- Jim Gaffigan as Hoovy, a goat-like inhabitant of a parallel universe which runs on "Narnia Time".
- Tom Kenny as Japheth, Hoovy's son.
- Jeff Loveness as Japheth's Son.
- Alison Brie as Planetina, an environmental super-heroine on whom Morty has a crush. She is heavily based on Captain Planet.
- Steve Buscemi as Eddie, a member of the Tina-Teers.
- Lauren Tom as:
  - Xing Ho, a member of the Tina-Teers.
  - Air, a member of the Tina Teers.
  - Kendra, the leader of the real GoGotrons.
- Brandon Johnson as Water, a member of the Tina-Teers.
- Rob Schrab as Diesel Weasel, an enemy of Planetina.
- Jennifer Coolidge as Daphne, an alien from Morglutz.
- Fred Stoller as a Ferkus 9 inhabitant.
- Michelle Buteau as the Sperm Queen
- Christina Ricci as:
  - Princess Poñeta, the princess of the CHUD.
  - Kathy Ireland, a supermodel and Blazen's wife.
- Darren Criss as:
  - Bruce Chutback, a new kid at Morty's high school.
  - Naruto Smith, a "Giant Incest Space Baby" borne of an experiment-gone-wrong.
- Timothy Olyphant as Coop, a black ops agent working for the President.
- Cassie Steele as Tamantha "Tammy" Gueterman, Birdperson's wife and an agent of the New-and-Improved Galactic Federation.
- Tom Kenny as Squanchy and additional voices.
- David Herman, Harland Williams, Grey DeLisle, Lauren Lapkus, Natasha Leggero, Jake Johnson, Chelsea Peretti and Nat Faxon as additional voices.

== Episodes ==
| No. overall | No. in season | Title | Directed by | Written by | Original release date | U.S. viewers (millions) |
|---|---|---|---|---|---|---|
| 42 | 1 | "Mort Dinner Rick Andre" | Jacob Hair | Jeff Loveness | June 20, 2021 | 1.30 |
While crash-landing Rick's ship in the ocean, Morty unexpectedly talks Jessica (Kari Wahlgren) into a date. Unfortunately, landing in the ocean provokes Rick's hitherto unmentioned nemesis, Mr. Nimbus (Dan Harmon), King of the ocean and controller of the police. Morty attempts to have a normal date at his home with Jessica while also helping Rick host a dinner party to placate Mr. Nimbus. In the process, he accidentally meddles with the history of an alternate dimension where time moves orders of magnitude faster than on Earth. Religions develop that depict Morty as a legendary figure of doom, complicating his attempts to retrieve the wine that he has been aging there. Just as Rick and Mr. Nimbus resolve their differences, Summer returns from executing Rick's orders to steal a shell that increases Mr. Nimbus' strength, inciting Mr. Nimbus to beat up Rick and have him arrested. Jessica decides to stay friends with Morty, her outlook on life changed profoundly from being imprisoned for eons by the alien society. Meanwhile, Beth and Jerry brag unconvincingly that their relationship has become more sex-positive. Post-credits scene: Beth and Jerry debate whether they should take Mr. Nimbus up on his offer of a threesome before doing so anyway, assured by Nimbus that Rick will understand.
| 43 | 2 | "Mortyplicity" | Lucas Gray | Albro Lundy | June 27, 2021 | 1.16 |
The Smith family is having breakfast when alien squid assassins kill them. They are revealed to be decoys, and the real Rick is alerted to their deaths. However, the "real" Smith family is revealed to also have been decoys, and a chaotic series of events erupt as the decoys are alerted to the deaths of other decoys and struggle to figure out which family is the original, for the original Rick did not realize the decoys would resort to making more decoys. After a family of decoys clashes and kills another, they figure out that the squids are actually further decoys trying to kill all other versions of themselves. Another family, who still thinks they are real, are kidnapped by deformed decoys trying to harvest their skin but are rescued by wooden decoys, who attempt to rally a group of decoys but are crushed to death when squid-decoys kill them. One family alerts all decoys to their location and all of the decoys are killed in the ensuing mayhem. Meanwhile, the real Smith family, on an adventure with Space Beth, are alerted to the decoys' deaths. Post-credits scene: Wooden Jerry, who previously escaped the squid decoys by abandoning his family, is cut into pieces by several beavers and subsequently taken by future animal-people, used as a mirror-holder in a cowboy saloon, and used as a crucifix, lamenting his inability to die.
| 44 | 3 | "A Rickconvenient Mort" | Juan Meza-Léon | Rob Schrab | July 4, 2021 | 1.01 |
Planetina (Alison Brie), a Captain Planet-esque superhero, puts a stop to acid rain falling on Rick and Morty. Seeing this, Morty immediately develops an interest in her. Later, Rick decides to take Summer on a trip to three planets which are about to be destroyed and are having large sexual orgies to celebrate their impending doom. While Morty is strengthening his relationship with Planetina, Rick finds a girlfriend, Daphne (Jennifer Coolidge), on the first planet and takes her with him. Back at home, Beth finds out about Planetina and forbids Morty to be with her. The two run away, avoiding the 4 people with magic rings who created her (including Eddie (Steve Buscemi)), who wants to sell her to a rich Sheikh. They pursue eco-friendly activities until Planetina stumbles upon a coal mine and decides to destroy it, killing 300 miners inside. Morty is distraught and horrified by this, and decides to end his relationship with Planetina, leaving Morty severely heartbroken with Beth comforting him and telling him she understands his pain. Rick and Summer, along with Daphne, travel to the third planet. Summer, tired of Rick ignoring her, uses Rick's car to destroy the asteroid. Daphne realizes that she's no longer in any danger and abandons Rick, proving Summer's earlier claim that she did not love him. Post-credits scene: Two of the inhabitants of the third planet (Ferkus 9), a father and son, go back to work after their world survives. They have an awkward conversation about how they had sex together the previous night, not expecting to still be alive the day after the catastrophe.
| 45 | 4 | "Rickdependence Spray" | Erica Hayes | Nick Rutherford | July 11, 2021 | 0.96 |
Rick unknowingly uses Morty’s sperm to create giant sperm monsters. The President works with the Smith family to destroy the sperm monsters, and pinpoint them in the Grand Canyon. Rick and Morty destroy the sperm queen's base of operations and follow the remaining sperm monsters to Las Vegas, where the government has placed a giant human egg from Summer, unaware that the sperm is Morty's, to attract the sperm. Once Morty reveals the sperm is his, the US military, Vegas performers, and the CHUD (horse-people) destroy most of them, but one abnormal sperm (which Morty names "Sticky") gets to the egg and fertilizes it before it launches into space. Post-credits scene: Morty and Summer's "Giant Incest Baby" floats in space and mistakes a wandering astronaut for a toy.
| 46 | 5 | "Amortycan Grickfitti" | Kyounghee Lim | Anne Lane | July 18, 2021 | 0.78 |
Rick uses Jerry's social ineptitude to inflict pain on, and thereby pleasure, pain-enjoying hell-demons to repay a debt Rick owes them. After realizing that he is being used as a pawn, Jerry refuses to cooperate with the demons, which leads the demons to kidnap him to Hell. Beth and Rick save him by disguising themselves as demons and creating an "Aversion-Converting Inversion Reverter", which shoots shrapnel reverting the pain from pleasurable back to painful, and kills many of the demons. Meanwhile, Morty and Summer try to impress high-status new student Bruce Chutback by hijacking the Space Cruiser and taking it on adventures, but they are found out by the car's AI, who blackmails them into going on even more life-threatening adventures. They try to appease it by setting it up on a date with a group of shape-shifting robots called Changeformers, but after the Space Cruiser is exposed as not a legitimate Changeformer, a brawl ensues in which the Space Cruiser kills the Changeformers. Morty, Summer, and Bruce are arrested, but are then rescued by the Space Cruiser, brought back home, and forced to act like nothing had happened. Bruce states that, while he enjoyed the night, he will only hang out with Morty and Summer if they have good standing within their school. Post-credits scene: Bruce is ridiculed at school for wearing jeans he wore the previous day, while Morty and Summer lament that they hope he can find solace in his own company. Later outside his house, Bruce is ganged up on by Mailboxians whom Summer previously attacked in their adventure.
| 47 | 6 | "Rick & Morty's Thanksploitation Spectacular" | Douglas Einar Olsen | James Siciliano | July 25, 2021 | 0.93 |
Morty releases a giant robot from the Statue of Liberty after accidentally destroying the Constitution of the United States in a hidden crypt. Rick tries to obtain a "turkey pardon" from the president by disguising himself and Morty as turkeys, but President Curtis, aware of Rick's schemes, turns himself and other military volunteers into turkeys to stop him. In the chaos, a turkey is accidentally infused with Curtis's DNA and takes his place. President Curtis, his forces, and Rick and Morty join forces with aliens and robots kept in stasis in the crypt to overthrow the turkey-president and his turkey enforcers. Rick is granted a pardon for his aid in the resistance. Post-credits scene: One of Curtis's volunteers retains his turkey senses and makes a public disturbance.
| 48 | 7 | "Gotron Jerrysis Rickvangelion" | Jacob Hair | John Harris | August 1, 2021 (Note: This episode was accidentally released on Amazon Prime Video in Canada on July 13, 2021, before being removed.) | 0.82 |
Rick, Morty, and Summer are on a space trip to Boob World when Rick spots a crashed GoTron ferret, completing his collection. Deciding to use the ferrets to fight giant bug-monsters attacking other worlds, the entire Smith family serve as pilots. As Rick’s obsession with the GoTron deepens, they start working with alternate-universe Smith families on building the Ultimate GoTron with all their collected ferrets, but also by stealing the other GoTrons from their universes' pilots. Summer feels like Rick appreciates her more than Morty, while Morty tries to help Summer see that Rick cares only about the GoTrons. Rick had already replaced her with an "anime girl" named Kendra; unbeknownst to Rick, Kendra commands the original GoTron pilots of the other universes, seeking their ferrets back. After Summer is fired, she reveals that her "Giant Incest Baby" (called "Naruto") is alive and she helped him escape from the military. The family returns to Rick and with Naruto's help they save him from the original GoTron pilots. After the rescue, Rick grows tired of the GoTrons. Post-credits scene: In another universe, a group of bugs are in a training school that wants to help other universes cure AIDS. Sadly, when walking through their portals, they are stripped of their clothes and are grotesquely enlarged. The Smiths and other planets, unable to understand their language, mistook them as a threat and attacked them.
| 49 | 8 | "Rickternal Friendshine of the Spotless Mort" | Erica Hayes | Albro Lundy | August 8, 2021 | 0.83 |
Rick enters Birdperson's mind in order to find out why he is failing to act normally and how he could bring back the original mind of Birdperson. Memories reveal that Birdperson distanced himself from Rick after Rick expressed feelings for him and told him life was meaningless because there are infinite realities he could take them to through the portal gun. Rick discovers that Birdperson and Tammy have a daughter, who was inhibited from Birdperson's memories by the Federation. They track down Birdperson's central body, where he is cherishing his relationship with Tammy blissfully unaware of her treachery. They are hunted down by other versions of Tammy and Phoenixperson and barely escape after Birdperson's memory of Tammy reveals that she loved him more than the Federation. Birdperson is revived in the real world, but his relationship with Rick is strained when he realizes Rick concealed the existence of his daughter from him, and leaves to find her. Rick finds his younger self hiding in memories of his childhood and offers to make him real, but his past self is hesitant due to fears of becoming like Rick himself. Post-credits scene: Birdperson and Tammy's daughter is kept in a prison with other inmates. As she brutally kills several prisoners, the insect guards remark that it was a bad idea to put all of the violent prisoners together.
| 50 | 9 | "Forgetting Sarick Mortshall" | Kyounghee Lim | Siobhan Thompson | September 5, 2021 | 0.91 |
Exasperated at having to continually clean up Rick's messes, Morty accidentally spills portal fluid on his hand and finds himself able to speak to Nick, another man who spilled Rick's portal fluid onto himself. They become friends and Morty breaks him out of the psychiatric facility in which he is confined. However, Nick shows himself to be a violent psychopath who spilled Rick's portal fluid after he had tried to steal the portal gun from Rick, and he pursues Morty, intending to make him his accomplice on a crime spree. After a violent chase and struggle, Morty has a train slice off his hand and puts it in Nick's portal, causing Nick to implode. Meanwhile, Rick teams up with two crows to show Morty how disposable he is, but after an adventure wherein they save him from anthropomorphic crows attempting to savage Earth, he realizes they are more than just disposable alternatives to Morty. After repairing Morty's hand, Rick leaves him behind to travel with the two crows, leaving Morty devastated. Post-credits scene: An alien called "Garbage Goober" that Rick uses to clean up his trash is revealed to actually be a doctor, who is scolded by his wife but decides to continue eating the Smith family's garbage anyways.
| 51 | 10 | "Rickmurai Jack" | Jacob Hair | Jeff Loveness & Scott Marder | September 5, 2021 | 0.94 |
Rick abandons his life of adventure with the crows when he discovers he is their rebound. He meets Morty at the Citadel, but they are accosted by Rick agents, who take them to see President Morty. There, Evil Morty reveals that he has used brain scans taken from Rick (Note: As depicted in "Close Rick-counters of the Rick Kind".) to create a path outside of the Central Finite Curve — an isolated portion of the multiverse where Rick is the smartest man alive, having restricted access for Ricks from universes where he is not. Flashbacks reveal Rick's backstory: after an alternate Rick murdered his wife Diane and a young Beth, (Note: First shown in "The Rickshank Rickdemption", where Rick displays these memories while being interrogated but claims that they are fabricated.) he invented his portal gun to scour the multiverse for their killer, creating the Curve before reuniting with Morty's family. A group of Ricks joined forces to stop him as he killed countless Ricks, eventually becoming the Citadel. Evil Morty reveals that he is tired of the abuse that all Ricks within the Central Finite Curve will invariably inflict upon their Mortys, and seeks to destroy the Curve in order to escape Rick forever; he hacks all the portal guns in the city, causing widespread death, then flees in an escape pod. Rick, Morty, and a group of survivors jettison themselves from the Citadel but are left stranded without any portal fluid, which along with the Curve is destroyed by a black hole created by the hacked portal guns. Evil Morty steps into a yellow portal to an unknown destination. Post-credits scene: Mr. Poopybutthole, now divorced, ponders on the proper course of action when one realizes who their loved ones really are, and how people do not have as much time as they think.

== Production ==
=== Development ===
Dan Harmon and Scott Marder said that season 5 would have a stronger sense of continuity than previous seasons. At a 2020 virtual Adult Swim festival, writer Scott Marder announced that "there's epic canon in season five coming" and that season four's Space Beth was set to be a main character in a future season (season 6). As of late October 2020, episodes were "pretty far along on [their] route to Adult Swim." A promotional animatic of Morty carrying a seemingly dead Rick across an alien planet was released in November 2020. Other animatics, including one that appears to be from the same episode as Rick is in the same condition he is in the first picture, have been released as well. A final animatic shows Morty confessing his feelings for Jessica as their spaceship crashes into the ocean. Once it does, Rick's long-time nemesis Mr. Nimbus greets them.

=== Writing ===
In October 2020, show creator Dan Harmon revealed that one of the episodes written by Rob Schrab in the upcoming season, now known as "A Rickconvenient Mort", would be about Morty's relationship with a woman who is not Jessica, and said that Morty "really feels heartache on a level a man his age shouldn't... my Emmy is going to that one." Schrab's writing for the episode was "very tender." Harmon also noted that production was happening ahead of schedule. Jeff Loveness, who wrote multiple episodes in season four, has been confirmed to be returning to write his last episodes for the series, including the season premiere. The season also delved deeper into Rick and Jerry's relationship.

=== Casting ===
Regulars Justin Roiland, Chris Parnell, Spencer Grammer, and Sarah Chalke were confirmed to return as the Smith family, with other characters including new addition to the cast, Mr. Nimbus. In January 2021, it was revealed that series creator Dan Harmon and Kari Wahlgren, a recurring voice in the series, would return to reprise their roles of Birdperson, Rick's old friend turned enemy after being reprogrammed by Tammy Gueterman, and Jessica, Morty's crush throughout the show, respectively. Space Beth, a character who last appeared in the finale of the previous season, voiced by Chalke, also returned. Guest stars during the season will include Timothy Olyphant, Christina Ricci, and Alison Brie.

== Release ==
The season premiered on June 20, 2021. Justin Roiland, who voices the two main characters, said that he would like to air one episode a month, so as to lengthen the time that the show is on the air. He reiterated this in March 2021. Roiland also claimed that the wait between all the rest of the seasons would "never be [as] long again" as they were between many of the previous seasons. On July 13, 2021, the seventh episode, "Gotron Jerrysis Rickvangelion", was leaked online in Canada through Amazon Prime Video, ahead of its official release date of August 1. It was removed shortly thereafter.

== Reception ==
On the review aggregator Rotten Tomatoes, season five has a 86% score based on 100 reviews. The site's critics consensus reads: "Rick and Morty starts showing signs of fatigue with an uneven batch of adventures that are often more crude than clever, but a major shakeup to the status quo helps this season finish strong." On Metacritic, the season has a score of 89 out of 100, based on 5 reviews, indicating "universal acclaim".

Brandon Katz of Observer said "Rick and Morty persists not only for its inversion of sci-fi tropes, clever pop culture riffing and raw hilarity. It continues to hold our interest in a way few shows do because it knows we are all capable of great and terrible things." David Opie of Digital Spy praised the series premiere, saying "It's just as inventive as ever, and by not resetting the status quo, there's more room for character development."
