= African-American presidents of the United States in popular culture =

Before and after the election of Barack Obama as the first African American president of the United States in 2008, the idea of a Black president has been explored by various writers in novels (including science fiction), films and television, as well as other media. Numerous actors have portrayed a Black president. Such portrayals have occurred in both serious works and comedies.

== Effect of media depictions ==
As writers and directors cast Black actors as president in several memorable portrayals, depictions of fictional Black presidents may have accustomed Americans to accept a Black man as president. Actor Dennis Haysbert, who played a Black president in the series 24, said the portrayal "may have opened the eyes, the minds and the hearts of people because the character was so well liked." The show also raised the issue of whether television series "like political trial ballons, can ready the populace for change."

After Barack Obama's election, the television series The Cosby Show was cited for what has been termed the "Huxtable effect" for the influence of its "warmhearted" portrayal, "free of street conflicts and ghetto stereotypes - that broke ground for its depiction of an upwardly mobile Black family." The series has been cited by some observers as a factor in Obama's victory.

== Novels ==
In 1926, Brazilian writer Monteiro Lobato published O Presidente Negro ("The Black President"), set in a dystopian future U.S. in 2228. It features Jim Roy, a fictional black president.

In 1964 Irving Wallace published The Man, a popular novel addressing the idea of a black president, named Douglass Dilman in the book. Critic Louis Bayard described it as a window into "Kennedy-era racial pathologies", despite the author's liberal attitude. It included the portrayal of attractive multiracial or "mulatto" women who could pass for white, as does the hero Dilman's own light-skinned daughter. The Man—which was made into a 1972 film starring James Earl Jones as Dilman—noted factors against a black president being elected in America, and Dilman's coming to power through an unlikely series of circumstances of succession.

Other novels featuring a first black president include Philip K. Dick's The Crack in Space (1966), and T. Ernesto Bethancourt's young adult novel The Tomorrow Connection (1984).

== Stand-up comedy ==
After civil rights and voting rights legislation was passed in 1964 and 1965, the move of blacks into full political participation began. Portrayals of blacks as president began to appear in comedians' routines. In the early years of his career in the 1960s, comedian Bill Cosby frequently told jokes along racial lines, including one about an imaginary first black president. He stopped when he decided to reach a wider audience.

In 1983 at age 22, Eddie Murphy (who was born the same year as Obama) enacted a parody of a black president in one of his stand-up routines, Eddie Murphy Delirious, filmed in Washington, D.C.

== Film and television ==
Writers and directors have featured a black man as president in several memorable portrayals. There have been film and television proposals based on the idea, as well. The first film portrayal of a black American president was probably that of Sammy Davis Jr. in the 1933 film Rufus Jones for President. In this short musical comedy, the 7-year-old Davis is told by his mother, portrayed by Ethel Waters, that "anyone can become president, and later dreams of his own inauguration". Outside the dreams, the film reflects contemporary racist attitudes.

The 1941 musical Babes on Broadway included Judy Garland in black male drag singing a song "Franklin Delano Jones", about the first black president of the United States.

"When Rod Serling adapted Irving Wallace's "The Man" to the screen in 1972—it was a joint production of Paramount Pictures and ABC Circle Films, originally intended to air on ABC's made-for-television Movie of the Week series, but the network chose not to air it, prompting Paramount to release the film to theaters instead—the political climate had changed sufficiently that he could promote Douglass Dilman from survivor to competitor—a genuine leader who, after standing up to his white rivals, vows to win the presidency through 'legitimate' electoral means." With James Earl Jones starring in 1972, the film version had a heroic black man as president, who ended the film in a position of moral authority.

In 1977 comedian Richard Pryor portrayed the first black president of the United States in a skit on The Richard Pryor Show, his short-lived foray on NBC television.

Lizzie Borden's 1983 science fiction film Born in Flames about a radical feminist insurgency, set in an alternative United States Socialist Democracy, features a black president.

The 1987 animated series Spiral Zone is the first television show in history to show a serious depiction of an African-American president of the United States in the episode The "Imposter".

In the 1993 science-fiction series SeaQuest DSV, the unnamed president of the United States featured in the first-season episode "Better Than Martians" is portrayed by African-American actor Steven Williams.

In the 1997 science-fiction film The Fifth Element, character actor Tom Lister, Jr. played President Lindberg, the commander-in-chief of not just the United States of America but the planet Earth. His competence to lead is not questioned due to his race. In fact, his skin color is never mentioned.

A generation after The Man, the 1998 science fiction film Deep Impact featured black actor Morgan Freeman as president Tom Beck. Critic Louis Bayard noticed that Dennis Haysbert seemed to adopt Freeman's cadences for his own role as president.

Ernie Hudson played President Westwood in the 1999 direct-to-video film Stealth Fighter.

In the series 24, a television precedent was set when Dennis Haysbert portrayed a lead character, David Palmer, and successful president who fought terrorism. Critic Charles Taylor described him as showing "the determination of magnetism, brains, resolve, compassion and willingness to make tough calls we dream of in a president." After the show portrayed the assassination of Palmer, his brother Wayne, played by D.B. Woodside, was also elected president. The Jerusalem Post speculated in June 2008 that television ratings "may have predicted Obama's primary victory over Hillary Clinton, as the most recent female television president appears to have been less popular than the black leaders of 24."

In 2000, Chris Tucker planned on writing, directing, producing and starring in a film about the first black president of the United States.

Chris Rock wrote, directed, and starred as presidential candidate Mays Gilliam in the 2003 comedy Head of State, described as "undernourished." The film's tagline was "The only thing white is the house". Another critic described Rock as in way over his head, and found it "depressing to see Rock pander to the most reactionary elements of the black audience." He also was surprised at some of the settings. "Rock doesn't seem to know much about contemporary America; when his character travels to Memphis (a majority-black city with a black mayor) we see only white people."

In 2004, a sketch on Chappelle's Show called "Black Bush" featured Dave Chappelle as an African-American "interpretation" of then President George W. Bush and his administration. It was controversial due to its set-up segment (which had Chappelle mocking fellow comedian Dennis Miller over the comedian's infamous "free pass" comment regarding not saying anything bad about Bush) and its overall theme that if Bush and his top aides were black, that the public would be more willing to be critical of the president and his decisions. The sketch also features cameo appearances by actor Jamie Foxx, who appears as "Black Tony Blair" and Mos Def as "Black Head of the CIA" holding "Yellowcake from Africa" (Anthony Berry's character warns the other not to "drop that shit", though it is clearly just yellow cake).

In CBS's 2004 TV series Century City's fictional timeline, Oprah Winfrey is the US president.

Louis Gossett Jr. played the president in two different films in 2005 — in the Christian film Left Behind: World at War he played President Gerald Fitzhugh and in the direct-to-DVD Solar Attack he played President Ryan Gordon.

Mike Judge's 2006 Idiocracy featured President Dwayne Elizondo Mountain Dew Herbert Camacho as a former porn star and champion wrestler played by erstwhile NFL defensive end Terry Crews. Critic Bayard thought it odd that the lead character seemed so little advanced from earlier 20th century caricatures. The "joke is essentially unchanged from the days of Rufus Jones: These are the last guys in the world -- or any world -- you'd want to vote for."

A 2006 BBC Four adaptation of John Wyndham's short story Random Quest depicts the main character being sucked into an alternate reality in which Condoleezza Rice is president of the United States.

In ABC's 2008 series Life on Mars (a remake of BBC's series of the same name), it is hinted that Malia Obama, the daughter of then-candidate Barack Obama, is the president in 2035.

The comic book Final Crisis #7 introduces Calvin Ellis, an African-American version of Superman who is the President of the United States in his secret identity. Writer Grant Morrison confirmed that this Superman is a homage to President Barack Obama.

=== After Obama's election ===
Actor Danny Glover played President Thomas Wilson in the 2009 film 2012.

NBC's 2010 series The Event features Blair Underwood in a starring role as Elias Martinez, an Afro-Cuban US president.

Actor Jamie Foxx played President James William Sawyer in the 2013 film White House Down.

Actor Samuel L. Jackson played William Alan Moore, the US president in the 2014 film Big Game.

In the 2014-2015 NBC TV series State of Affairs, Alfre Woodard plays Constance Payton, the first black female president of the United States.

In 2015, Keith David first voiced President Andre Curtis in Rick and Morty in the episode titled "Get Schwifty" (Season 2, Episode 5). The President has also appeared in episodes: "The Rickchurian Mortydate" (Season 3, Episode 10), "Rickdependence Spray" (Season 5, Episode 4), "Rick and Morty's Thanksploitation Spectacular" (Season 5, Episode 6), "Juricksic Mort" (Season 6, Episode 6), "Ricktional Mortpoon's Rickmas Mortcation" (Season 6, Episode 10), and "Air Force Wong" (Season 7, Episode 3). In July 2025, a spinoff series titled President Curtis was announced focusing on the character, with David reprising his role. The series premiered on July 26, 2026, on Adult Swim.

In 2016, actor Danny Johnson played President Todd in season 2 of the television show Quantico.

In 2019, the flashforward to 2045 in the final episode of Veep revealed that President Kemi Talbot (Toks Olagundoye) served two terms sometime between 2025 and 2041. President Richard Splett (Sam Richardson) was the incumbent president of 2045, having won a landslide reelection in 2044.

In 2019, Morgan Freeman played President Allan Trumbull in Angel Has Fallen, the third film in the Fallen film series. He previously played Allan Trumbull as Speaker of the House in Olympus Has Fallen and as Vice President in London Has Fallen. Freeman previously played President Tom Beck in the 1998 film Deep Impact.

In 2025, Viola Davis played President Danielle Sutton in the film G20.

In 2025, Angela Bassett appears as President Mitchell in the Netflix show Zero Day and she also appeared as President Erika Sloane in Mission: Impossible – The Final Reckoning.

In 2025, Idris Elba portrayed the President of the United States in the film A House of Dynamite.

== Music ==
The Minstrel song "Zip Coon" includes the titular character becoming president following Andrew Jackson, having been published in 1834 it is the earliest reference in popular culture of an African American president.

Parliament's 1975 Washington, D.C.-themed song Chocolate City had Muhammad Ali as President of the United States and James Brown as vice president, among others.

In 1983, R&B artist Blowfly released a track entitled "The first black president", a conversation between President Blowfly and his assistant over hip hop music.

The music video accompanying N.W.A's "Express Yourself" featured a shot of the White House with the caption, "Live from the Black House", followed by one of Dr. Dre swiveling a chair in what is apparently meant to represent the Oval Office. Several more shots in the video continue the same scene.

Rap artist Nas was inspired by the Obama campaign to write a song entitled "Black President", which includes quotations from Obama. The track samples Tupac Shakur with a modified lyric saying, "And although it seems heaven sent, we ain't ready to have a black president."

Rap artist Young Jeezy, also inspired by the Obama campaign, wrote a song entitled "My President", which also featured Nas, and featured the chorus "My President Is Black ..."

When he appeared in speaking roles on Snoop Dogg's album No Limit Top Dogg, actor Rudy Ray Moore joked that he would run for president with two priorities - painting the White House black and legalizing just about everything.

== Effect of Obama's presidency on television ==
The Obama presidency had the potential to affect television shows, but people had differing reactions to that. The comedian and actor Bill Cosby said he was "not all that optimistic that Obama's presidency will make a major difference in terms of onscreen diversity," saying "they would die before putting another show on about a black family and black pride."

Pastor T.D. Jakes noted the portrayal on television of "middle-class African-Americans who are articulate, intelligent and thoughtful." He hoped the new president would make a difference in encouraging those types of depictions. "The Obama effect might even go beyond bolstering the presence of blacks on television and actually bring about a tonal change in programming," according to Brok Akil. She wrote a script based on a book called Making Friends With Black People, a buddy comedy that focuses on the state of race relations in the U.S. She added that, "In our pitch to NBC, we referenced Obama." She also said, "We talked about how he has gotten us to the table to talk about race in a meaningful way and it's time to continue the discussion. So our new president has already had an impact."

== See also ==
- List of presidents of the United States
- Lists of fictional presidents of the United States
- President of the United States in fiction
- African-American candidates for President of the United States
- African heritage of presidents of the United States
- List of actors who have played the president of the United States
- Female president of the United States in popular culture
- Public image of Barack Obama § In popular culture
