= List of fictional presidents of the United States (C–D) =

Lists of fictional presidents of the United States
A–B	C–D	E–F
G–H	I–J	K–M
N–R	S–T	U–Z
Fictional presidencies of historical figures
A–B	C–D	E–G
H–J	K–L	M–O
P–R	S–U	V–Z

The following is a list of fictional presidents of the United States, C through D.

== C ==
=== President Billy Cabot ===
- President in: The Accidental Time Machine
- In 2180 President Cabot is the first human to witness the Second Coming. Jesus shows up in the Oval Office, anoints the President as his First Bishop and tasks him to proselytize the rest of the nation, which sets off the One Year War. The Army of the Lord, made of Christers who accept the President's visitor as being the returned Jesus, fight the Doubters, who suspect this visitor of being nothing but a hoax. Over the course of the war, New York City, the eastern third of New York State, Miami, Atlanta, large parts of Maryland and Virginia, and various other locations are destroyed. After about half the population on the East Coast is killed and the situation is stabilizes: the United States government, headed by the President-Bishop and with Jesus making frequent appearances and performing various miracles, remains in control of the Eastern Seaboard and cuts itself off completely from the seceding Godless states to its west, known collectively as "Gommorrah" or "Holywood".

=== President Jack Cahill ===
- President in: Chain of Command
- Played by: Roy Scheider

=== President Patricia Caldwell ===
- President in: Tom Clancy's Splinter Cell: Conviction and Blacklist
- Succeeds David Bowers, who was president in the previous Splinter Cell installments.
- An assassination attempt is made on her life by corrupt elements of Third Echelon, a sub-agency of the NSA. She is rescued by rogue agent Sam Fisher.
- She orders the termination of Third Echelon and authorizes the launch of Fourth Echelon under the direction of Fisher.
- She leads the nation's campaign to counter "The Blackist", a series of coordinated terrorist attacks planned against the United States aimed to end America's overseas military presence worldwide.
- She is re-elected to a second term of office.
- Party: Democratic

=== President Steven Calhoun ===
- President in: The Boys live-action television series (Season 4-5).
- As US Senator for Oklahoma, he refused to support a bill which would have allowed Supes to enlist in the US Armed Forces until he was blackmailed into doing so after being photographed having sex with Doppelgänger (who had taken the form of a young woman).
- As Speaker of the House of Representatives, he is responsible for overseeing the certification of the 2024 election results. Whilst attending a Federalist Society party hosted by Tek Knight, he is convinced to join a plot to oust President-elect Robert Singer by Homelander and Victoria Neuman (Singer's running mate and a corrupt, closeted Supe).
- When Homelander outs Neuman as a Supe on live television, Calhoun refuses to reopen the certification of the election results following this revelation, leading to nationwide rioting and protests and an assassination attempt against Singer.
- After Neuman is assassinated by Billy Butcher, Singer is arrested after Sister Sage frames him for orchestrating it, leading Calhoun being elevated to the presidency under the Twenty-fifth Amendment. He immediately swears allegiance to Homelander, deputizing him and Vought after declaring martial law, and revealing the statis pod that Soldier Boy (Homelander's father) was being detained in.
- Calhoun effectively serves as a puppet to Homelander, establishing a series of 'freedom camps' for the detainment of Starlight supporters (including anyone who has expressed pro-Starlight or anti-Homelander sentiment online), appointing former Vought CEO Ashley Barrett (whose use of Compound V gave her psychic abilities and a sentiment second face) as Vice President, and pardoning a revived Soldier Boy for treason and espionage (crimes fabricated by Vought to cover up his detainment in Russia).
- A year into his Presidency, Homelander is empowered by V1, a Compound V variant that gives immortality and immunity to the Supe-killing virus. Having descended into egothemism, Homelander visits the White House and makes a series of bizarre, psychotic demands on Calhoun including repealing all separations of church and state to make the Democratic Church of America (founded to formalise Homelander's 'divinity') the official national religion, abolishing Congress and banning nut milk.
- When Homelander senses Calhoun's reticence, he has Barrett confirm his disloyalty with her psychic ability, resulting in Homelander killing Calhoun by crushing his head in the Oval Office.
- Political Party: Republican
- Portrayed by: David Andrews

=== President Gary Callahan ===
- President in: Transmetropolitan
- He is arrested for murder while in office.
- Also known as "The Smiler".

=== President Dwayne Elizondo Mountain Dew Herbert Camacho ===
- President in: Idiocracy
- President in the year 2505.
- He is formerly a professional wrestler and pornographic actor. His presidency is plagued with rampant famine, dust storms, and the collapse of the Brawndo company.
- Played by Terry Crews

=== President Ted Campbell ===
- President in: Y: The Last Man (TV series)
- The incumbent president who died in a cataclysmic event which simultaneously killed all mammals with a Y chromosome except for escape artist Yorick Brown and his pet monkey Ampersand.
- Prior to the event, he had ordered the Culper Ring operative Agent 355 to kill a white supremacist terrorist cell, and had been criticised by the Chair of the House Intelligence Committee Chair (and his eventual successor) Jennifer Brown for not backing a bill that would have permitted social media sites to permanently ban white supremacists.
- His daughter Kimberly Campbell Cunningham, a right-wing author and unofficial advisor, leads a caucus of surviving Republican lawmakers who, in part, wish to remove the newly sworn in Democrat Brown as president in order to restore the influence they had under the Campbell administration. However, they are hesitant about elevating Regina Oliver, President Campbell's Secretary of Veterans Affairs, to the presidency due to her fringe views.
- Party: Republican
- Played by Paul Gross

=== President Jennifer Capper ===
- President in: Kingdom Come by Elliot S. Maggin (based on the comic book miniseries of the same name by Mark Waid and Alex Ross)
- She is elected president without actively running.
- Serves term during a nuclear disaster caused by a clash of superhumans in Kansas.
- Party: New Federalist.

=== President James (Jim) Carlisle ===
- President in: Guarding Tess
- Former governor and US senator from Ohio who is elected to the White House in the late 1980s, and dies in office. His widow Tess is kidnapped and later rescued by a Secret Service agent.
- Played by: George Gomes

=== President Carlson ===
- President in: Executive Target (1997 film)
- Running for re-election; wants to cut defense spending and Star Wars and reinvest the money in health care and education.
- Played by: Roy Scheider

=== President Carmody ===
- President in I, Martha Adams by Pauline Glen Winslow (1982 novel).
- Carmody is elected president after President Reagan and Vice President Bush are assassinated in a bombing.
- Cuts back defense in an effort to appease the Soviet Union, and surrenders to it after a Counterforce Attack destroys the bulk of the U.S. Nuclear Deterrent.
- Forced to resign by Soviets in favor of Vice President Bristol.

=== President Francis T. Carroll ===
- Former president in Letter 44 (comic book series, 2013–)
- 43rd President of the United States (caricature of George W. Bush).

=== President Quinton Carroway ===
- President in: Quantum Night
- Party: Republican; fictionalized amalgamation of several politicians, primarily then-candidate Donald Trump.
- Enforces Islamophobic policies and expands US security apparatus.
- Orders the invasion of Canada in response to Naheed Nenshi becoming Prime Minister of Canada.

=== President Carson ===
- President in: The Last Centurion
- Defeats incumbent President Warrick (Democrat) after her mental breakdown.
- Party: Republican

=== President Benito Caruso ===
- President in: The Shape of Things to Come
- Serves from 1956 to 1962 though his term had expired, because his successor-elect disappears in the Allegheny Mountains on his way to the capital.
- His authority in practice is restricted to the environs of Washington D.C., because the US disintegrated from the failure of the New Deal and the decades-long continuation and deepening of the 1929 economic crisis.
- Caruso is mentioned among the statesmen from different countries ineffectively trying to negotiate an end to the European war of the 1940s (in which the US did not get involved).

=== President James Cassidy ===
- President in: The Greek Tycoon
- Cassidy is a representation of John F. Kennedy.

=== President John Trelawney Cassidy ===
- President in: Promises to Keep by George Bernau (novel)
- Cassidy is a roman à clef representation of John F. Kennedy. The novel assumes an alternate history in which Cassidy survives a November 1963 assassination attempt.
- Cassidy spends the remaining fourteen months of his term recovering from gunshot wounds and does not run for re-election in 1964. He allows his vice president, Ransom W. Gardner, to run in his place, on the condition that Gardner names his brother, Attorney General Tim Cassidy, as vice president. John Cassidy runs for and wins the 1964 election as senator from New York.
- After Tim Cassidy is killed in Vietnam, John Cassidy challenges Gardner for the Democratic nomination in 1968.
- Cassidy survives a second assassination attempt in Los Angeles and is elected the 37th President of the United States.

=== President Samuel Adams Castilla ===
- President in: Covert-One by several authors (based on unpublished material from Robert Ludlum)
- Early in his presidency, Castilla authorizes the creation of a top-secret US agency named Covert-One.

=== President Castilla ===
- President in Covert One: The Hades Factor
- Unlike in the book, President Castilla is female in the movies
- Played by Anjelica Huston

=== President Benjamin Castillo ===
- President in: The Unit
- First Hispanic president.
- While still President-Elect, he falls victim to a day of widespread terrorist attacks on the executive branch in the episode "Sacrifice". The attacks claim the lives of incumbent Vice President Charles Horton while on a visit to Rome and Castillo's running mate.
- He is attacked in a motorcade attacked by terrorists in Cascade, Colorado, while en route to Colorado Springs Airport. Castillo is able to escape, flanked by two surviving Secret Service agents who are later killed. He is pursued through the Colorado countryside by the terrorists, who are disguised as members of the Colorado Army National Guard. He is later rescued by Delta Force operatives and returned to safety, with the news of the attack on his motorcade being censored from the public to prevent widespread national panic. The assassination of his running mate is blamed on an accidental gas leak for the same reason.
- Later appears as president, in "The Last Nazi", where he orders the Delta Force team to track down a surviving Schutzstaffel officer in Switzerland and bring him to The Hague to prevent private operatives working for his close friend and donor (a survivor of the Holocaust whose family was killed by the man) from killing him.
- Also appears in "Unknown Soldier", where he orders the unit to track down and defuse a set of dirty bombs bound for various cities across the United States.
- Secret Service codename: Spinnaker
- Portrayed by: Benito Martinez

=== President Janice Castleman ===
- President in: Remnants
- First female and African-American president.
- She is killed during the asteroid collision along with virtually everyone else on Earth.

=== President Chadbourne ===
- President in: Wolves of the Calla
- Chadbourne appears on the ten dollar bill in an alternate reality.

=== President Chambers ===
- President in: Long Shot
- Actor known for playing a fictional president on a television show before being elected in 2016.
- He chooses not to run for re-election in 2020 to pursue a career in film.
- Term: 2017–2021
- Portrayed by: Bob Odenkirk

=== President Samuel Chambers ===
- President in: The Survivalist
- Former Secretary of Communications before becoming president after the incumbent president commits suicide rather than surrender to the Soviets at the start of a nuclear war.

=== President Harrison Chandler ===
- President in: Amazon Women on the Moon

=== President William Chandler ===
- President in: Hitler's Daughter by Timothy Benford.
- Two-term president.

=== President Charles ===
- President in: Jericho
- As Secretary of Health and Human Services, Charles is next in line of succession after most members of the US government are killed in a series of nuclear attacks on two dozen American cities.
- In the aftermath of the attacks, Charles' claim to the presidency is challenged by five other surviving government officials (mostly members of the US Senate). His administration manages to regain control over all US territory east of the Mississippi with Columbus, Ohio, as the new capital. However, two newly emerged governments refuse to recognize the administration: the Allied States of America (led by former Wyoming senator John Tomarchio) and an independent Texas.

=== President Arthur Christensen ===
- President in: The Double Man by Gary Hart and William Cohen (1984 novel).
- President Christensen approves of a plan to allow a U.S. Senator to be kidnapped and framed for treason.

=== President Thomas Christian ===
- President in: Too Close to Home
- Has an affair with the show's protagonist, Anna Hayes.
- Played by: Matt Battaglia

=== President Ellen Claremont ===
- President in: Red, White & Royal Blue
- Claremont is from Texas and served in the U.S. House of Representatives. She was Speaker of the House. She is elected President in 2016 with Senator Mike Holleran of Vermont as her running mate. She is re-elected in 2020, in which Senator Jeffrey Richards of Utah is her major opponent.
- She is married to a man named Leo. Senator Oscar Diaz of California is her ex-husband and the father of her children, Alex and June. In the film adaptation, she is still married to Oscar, who is a Texas Congressman, with Alex as an only child.
- Claremont and her team craft the public persona of the White House Trio for her son Alex, her daughter June, and Holleran's granddaughter Nora so they would have greater control over how the public perceived them.
- Party: Democratic
- Played By: Uma Thurman in the film adaptation.

=== Acting President Sam Clark ===
- President in: Shelley's Heart by Charles McCarry (1995 novel)
- Former Senator from Massachusetts who is chosen to be vice president by President R. Tucker Attenborough.
- Appointed as vice president in less than a day, and then takes over as acting President due to Attenborough's failing health under the 25th Amendment.
- Party: Democratic

=== President David Coffey ===
- President in: Footfall

=== President Cole ===
- President in: Read or Die and R.O.D the TV
- Seen as clumsy, bumbling, and cowardly, urinating in his pants when terrified.

=== President James Collins ===
- President in: Chucky season 3
- Party: Independent
- Has a wife named Charlotte and two sons named Grant and Henry. The couple also had a third son named Joseph, who died a year before the events of the series.
- Elected on a platform of total transparency, he upholds this even in light of serious situations such as the White House's power grid being hacked or a Secret Service agent's apparent suicide (actually having been murdered by Chucky).
- Despite this, he employs CIA agent Warren Pryce to investigate the growing number of murders committed by Chucky in secret, with Pryce and Charlotte then keeping the murders covered up even from Collins to give him plausible deniability.
- Chucky assassinates Collins to steal his nuclear launch codes, although he is prevented from starting World War Three.
- In the aftermath of his death, Pryce uses a body double to fabricate a story of Collins' resignation due to a 'brain tumour' and facilitate an orderly transition to Vice President Spencer Rhodes. However, before this plan can be enacted, events spiral out of control, resulting in the deaths of the body double, Rhodes, Pryce and many others, alongside the White House burning down.
- Charlotte, Grant and Henry survive the events, and Chucky's influence is banished from the White House.
- The Presidency presumably passes to the Speaker of the House.
- Played by: Devon Sawa

=== President Robert Colonby ===
- President in The Eclipse of Dawn (1971) by Gordon Eklund
- Runs for president in 1988 after the US collapsed in The Second Civil War and the White House was moved from ruined Washington, D.C., to California. He reunites the nation with extraterrestrial help from Jupiter. He is revealed to be a murderer, but the narrator considers him to be "The Best Man for the Nation".

=== President Monroe "Eagle" Cole ===
- President in: Welcome to Mooseport
- Native of Mooseport, Maine, Cole serves two terms as president and attempts to run for mayor of Mooseport after his presidency. Is the first president to divorce his wife while in office.
- Played by: Gene Hackman
- Party: Democratic

=== President Alex Coleman ===
- President in: .hack
- Succeeds President Jim Stonecold, who resigns after the Pluto's Kiss incident.
- Announces the "Network Peace Proclamation" to the world on December 14, 2007, exactly three years after the Pluto's Kiss incident destroyed the modern internet.

=== President Fred Collier ===
- President in: Political Animals
- Before entering politics, Collier served for three decades with the CIA and became the agency's director. He is selected as the Democratic vice presidential candidate by Senator Paul Garcetti, as Collier has influence over the party's conservative wing, whose votes Garcetti needs.
- Upon taking office, Collier fights with Secretary of State Elaine Barrish, whom he resented for having more influence in government than he did.
- In late 2010, Collier blackmails Republican Congressman Sean Reeves into backing an administration bill after he procured evidence of Reeves's closeted homosexuality and affair with Barrish's son, T.J Hammond, which indirectly leads to T.J attempting suicide and T.J's father, former President Bud Hammond, punching Collier in the Oval Office upon learning of Collier's blackmail.
- Collier is to be dropped as vice president by Garcetti after the latter learns of the blackmail, but Garcetti dies when Air Force One crashes due to a technical fault in mid-2011, leaving Collier as Acting President and then President after Garcetti's corpse was found in the wreckage.
- Term: July 2011 onwards
- Party: Democratic
- Played by: Dylan Baker

=== President Angela Colloton ===
- President in: Shadowrun
- Serves from 2069 to 2078
- 11th UCAS President | 57th US President
- Party: Republican
- Succeeds President Gene Simone

=== President Compson ===
- President in: Digger (2026 film)
- Played by: John Goodman
- A highly conservative president who has disdain for Russia and China, and insists on having an evangelist pastor in his inner circle who leads prayer over him after every cabinet meeting.
- Is heavily in the pocket of oil tycoon Digger Rockwell, having accepted bribes to give him exclusive rights to drilling in Alaska and arranging a deal to allow him to also drill in Greenland.
- When Digger's Greenland drilling unleashes a massive amount of methane that leads to an explosion that not only destroys his rig but breaks free a large chunk of the ice shelf codenamed "Judy", which starts drifting towards Northern Europe, Compson refuses to do anything about it, seeing it as not being an American problem and not wanting to be blamed for it.
- When Judy collides with Norway and causes massive flooding across Europe with a large death toll, he can't handle the stress on top of needing surgery for his colon cancer, so orders his Vice-President and Digger to speak before the European Parliament and offer explanations and apologies in his place.
- While recovering from his surgery, he's informed that a second iceberg codenamed "Kremlinova" has broken off of the Russian ice shelf and is now drifting towards Alaska. In a delusional state, he becomes convinced that this is an attack by Russia and China, and prepares to launch a nuclear attack on them, only to be told that the process of doing so is more complicated than just "pushing a button", which makes him give up in frustration. Instead, Digger convinces him to launch conventional munitions against Kremlinova, which only succeeds in breaking it into numerous large pieces and releasing toxins and viruses that were trapped in the ice into the atmosphere, causing seemingly permanent damage to the global environment.
- Appears to spend his final years in exile with Digger and his family aboard a deep sea oil rig, as his body is shown being kept preserved in their kitchen freezer until such time as they can arrange to have him granted a funeral.
- As most of the film's events are shown to be part of a satirical historical play called Fossil Fools, being produced decades after the events depicted by people living in a post-Kremlinova world, it's unclear how much of what's shown about Compson is actually meant to be accurate.

=== President Deklan Comstock/President Julian Comstock ===
- Presidents in: Julian Comstock: A Story of 22nd-Century America and Julian: A Christmas Story
- In 2172 Deklan Comstock, a repressive and dictatorial hereditary president assassinates his brother, but his Liberal nephew Julian escapes. Julian Comstock overthrows his uncle and embark on democratic reforms, but is overthrown and assassinated by the reactionary armed forces and official church.

=== President Billy Connor ===
- President in: The Spike
- An ultra-liberal former Congressman from Mississippi, he is oblivious to a Soviet plot to overthrow the Saudi monarchy and cut off Mideast oil to the West.

=== President David Connor ===
- President in: Triumph by Philip Wylie (1963 novel)
- President Connor is killed along with his family while being evacuated from Washington, D.C. during a nuclear attack.

=== President Samuel Conrad ===
- President in: Act of War and Edge of Battle by Tom Clancy
- Declares war against global terrorism after a nuclear attack in Houston and attempted nuke in San Francisco.
- Survives a terrorist attack and invasion of White House.

=== President Hamilton Conroy ===
- President in: Coyote
- Conroy is purportedly a descendant of Alexander Hamilton and is the President of the United Republic of America, an extreme right-wing reorganization of the United States of America where New England and the Pacific Northwest have seceded and become sovereign nations, at least up until 2070.
- A former Congressman from Alabama, he is instrumental in getting Operation Starflight, the first crewed deep-space mission to colonize 47 Ursae Majoris, up and running.
- Party: Liberty Party, an ultra-right-wing neoconservative party

=== President Edward Randolph Cooper ===
- President in: Scandal
- Serves as the 40th president, whose popular conservative leadership influences the policies of his Republican successors.
- Married to First Lady Bitsy Cooper, but has a string of affairs while in office.
- Secretly suffers from diagnosed ADHD, requiring his wife to essentially run the nation and provide him with guidance out of the public eye.
- Survived an assassination attempt in 1986 perpetrated by Leonard Carnahan, who shot him whilst he was campaigning in Stockton, California.
- Although he survived the attempt on his life, the bullet remained in his head as it was too dangerous for medical staff to remove it. Cooper dies in 2014 of a stroke caused by complications from the injury.
- Political party: Republican

=== President Will "Chewey" Cooper ===
- President in: Pixels
- He is an initially unpopular president whose popularity surges when his childhood friend, Sam Brenner (Adam Sandler), helps defend the world against aliens.
- He is an expert at the crane game, which comes in handy to defeat the alien invaders.
- Played by: Kevin James

=== President Joseph Copeland ===
- President in: Mobile Suit Gundam SEED Destiny
- Voiced by: Taiten Kusunoki
- President of the superstate successor of the United States

=== President Tad Copeland ===
- President in: the novels of Guillaume Musso
- A university professor from Philadelphia, moderate Republican, former governor of Pennsylvania
- Plays a major role in Mussos book Brooklyn Girl, where he is on track to win the Republican primary against Donald Trump and Ted Cruz
- Has an extra-marital affair with an African-American woman, Joyce Carlyle, and an illegitimate child with her, Claire Carlyle, the later fiancée of the books protagonist, Raphael Barthelemy.
- While trying to convince Joyce to keep their affair a secret because his presidential campaign would be endangered, the two get into an argument in which he accidentally kills her
- In the following novel by Musso, An apartment in Paris, he wins the election but is poorly received.

=== President Cord ===
- President in: Stealth Bomber by Barnaby Williams (1990 novel)
- Believing that Cord's defense policy would be beneficial to the Soviet Union during the Cold War, the Soviets manipulate a presidential election to have Cord elected. Their plot is exposed when Iran tries to start World War Three.

=== President John J. Cormack ===
- President in: The Negotiator

=== President Guy "Whitey" Corngood ===
- President in: Mr. Show with Bob and David
- Played by: Jay Johnston

=== President Daniel Cox ===
- President in: First Family by David Baldacci

=== President Daniel Keem ===
- President in: Hunt Down the Freeman by Royal Rudius Entertainment (video game)
- Played by: Daniel Keem/DJ Killer Keemstar

=== President William A. Cozzano ===
- President in: Interface
- He is assassinated on his inauguration day and succeeded by Vice President Eleanor Richmond

=== President Calvin Craig ===
- President in: Assassination
- Played by: Charles Howerton

=== President Stanley Craig ===
- President in: The President Vanishes
- Played by: Arthur Byron

=== President Hugh Crane ===
- President in: Schrödinger's Cat Trilogy
- Succeeds President Carter upon his death.

=== President Benjamin Edgar Cross ===
- President in: HaShminiya and the Samurai Night Adventures

=== President Mary Alice "Muffy" Crosswire ===
- President in: "The Election" (Arthur) She is being sworn in as President before Arthur Read calls out to Muffy.
- Played by: Melissa Altro

=== President Andrew Y. Culpepper ===
- President in: Moonfall by Jack McDevitt
- First African-American president and the oldest elected president
- Is elected to office in 2008 and re-elected in 2012.
- Opens his presidential library in 2019.
- Dies in his sleep in 2021 at the age of 91.
- Party: Democratic

=== President John Robert Culpepper ===
- President in: I, Q
- He is a mentioned in the first book (I, Q: Independence Hall)
- He is a minor character in the second book (I, Q: The White House), where he risks his position to keep the cover of a spy attempting to take down a terrorist organization.

=== President George Cunningham ===
- President in: The Cassandra Project by Jack McDevitt and Mike Resnick
- Middle East combat veteran.
- Is elected to office in 2016.
- Struggles to deal with multiple crises, including population growth, the impending availability of life expectancy extension, two wars in Africa and the revelation of a cover-up about the early Apollo moon missions.

=== President William Arthur Curry ===
- President in: The Company by John Ehrlichman (novel), adapted as Washington: Behind Closed Doors.
- Curry is a roman à clef representation of John F. Kennedy.
- Is elected Governor of New York before appointing himself to a vacant US Senate seat two years later.
- Wins the nomination from Senator Esker Scott Anderson of Oregon and asks him to be his vice presidential running mate.
- Defeats Republican James Dudley and his running mate, Illinois Senator Richard Monckton.
- Allows a CIA plan to aid an exile invasion of the Dominican Republic, but orders an assassination calculated to make the invasion fail.
- In September of his second year in office, he flies from Albany to meet his wife Jenna at Camp David, when a private plane accidentally collides with Air Force One, killing everyone on board.
- Party: Democratic

=== President John Curtin ===
- President in: Logan's Run
- Overweight and the father of several children, President Curtin in the year 2000 advocated a one-child policy to deal with overpopulation. The resulting protest led to a nuclear war.

=== President Andre Curtis ===
- President in: Rick and Morty
- Commonly known simply as the President, President Curtis shares a love–hate relationship with Rick Sanchez, often alternating between calling upon him and his grandson Morty Smith to protect America and the world from various threats, to attempting to have him arrested or killed. He was first introduced in the second season episode "Get Schwifty".
- Voiced by: Keith David

=== President Johnny Cyclops ===
- President in: Whoops Apocalypse
- A recently lobotomized former screen actor, who is hated at home and desperate to regain popularity. With other world leaders, he starts World War III, resulting in a nuclear holocaust.
- Played by: Barry Morse
- Party: Republican

=== President (Civil War) ===
- President in: Civil War
- Serving an unconstitional third term in office in the near future, which results in the outbreak of the Second American Civil War and multiple secessionist movements named the Western Forces, Florida Alliance and New People's Army.
- The states that retain allegiance to his federal government are known as the Loyalists.
- During his time in office is mentioned to have dissolved the FBI and ordered drone strikes on American cities and civilians.
- Remains in the fortified White House compound as soldiers from the largest secessionist movement, the Western Forces (comprising California and Texas) advance on Washington, D.C. and capture The Pentagon. This results in the vast majority of his military and law enforcement support, aside from some die hard remnants of the United States Army and Secret Service, surrendering.
- Attempts to distract approaching Western Forces soldiers by having The Beast flee the White House. However, it is stopped and the occupants (implied to be either his Vice President or the First Lady and her security detail) are gunned down.
- When a small team of Western Forces soldiers and marines are able to breach the White House, it is revealed numerous staffers have committed suicide to avoid being captured. The Western Forces refuse his attempts, via members of his Presidential Protection Detail, to surrender and negotiate safe passage to either Alaska or Greenland.
- After a protracted firefight with Secret Service agents in the James S. Brady Press Briefing Room and West Wing, Western Forces troops are able to capture the President in the Oval Office as he hides beneath the Resolute Desk.
- Prior to his summary execution, he utters his last words "please don't let them kill me" to a Reuters reporter and an independent photojournalist who were embedded with the attacking soldiers.
- Played by: Nick Offerman
- Party: Unknown

== D ==
=== President Jack D'Amici ===
- President in: the novels of Jim DeFelice

=== President James Dale ===
- President in: Mars Attacks!
- During Dale's re-election campaign, Earth makes contact with aliens, and he is killed shortly after contact.
- Played by: Jack Nicholson

=== President Joan Dale ===
- President in: Reign of the Supermen
- In a world where Superman died fighting Doomsday, President Joan Dale is protected by the Justice League.
- She was previously the superheroine Miss America.
- Voiced by: Jennifer Hale

=== President Taffy Dale ===
- Acting President in: Mars Attacks!
- Daughter of President James Dale
- Effectively becomes president after the entire United States presidential line of succession is wiped out by invading aliens and survivors look to her for leadership.
- Played by: Natalie Portman

=== President Chauncey Talcott Dallas ===
- Incumbent in: The Gentleman from California by Niven Busch

=== President Conrad Dalton ===
- President in: Madam Secretary
- Played by: Keith Carradine
- Former Director of the Central Intelligence Agency of 12 years.
- In his first term, IA Director Andrew Munsey, Secretary of State Vincent Marsh, and other intelligence officials plan a coup in Iran to stop the Iranian peace talks. Marsh is killed during the planning, prompting Dalton to replace him with Elizabeth McCord, a former senior CIA analyst and Georgetown professor. His administration signs a peace treaty with Iran to diffuse their nuclear weapons program in 2015 after the attempted coup fails and the Munsey conspiracy is exposed.
- In 2015 he opens relations with Cuba by lifting the trade embargo.
- Dalton initially escalates a conflict over Ukraine with new Russian President Maria Ostrova, leading to an air battle between air forces before diffusing the conflict with McCord's help. Dalton holds the peace deal with the new Russian government after Ostrova's assassination. In a further development to return a US asset (Russian military officer Dimitri Petrov) who had helped the US massively during the conflict but had been captured, Dalton authorizes a spy swap for the officer with Russian spy Peter Buckley, a former CIA officer and US traitor.
- Dalton deals with terrorist group Hizb al-Shahid, who commit terrorist attacks in the Middle East. When their members detonate a dirty bomb in Washington D.C., Dalton authorizes the formation of a top-secret intel unit to combat them including former spy Henry McCord, Elizabeth's husband.
- Dalton tries to broker peace between India and Pakistan but the talks fail due to a Pakistani nuclear bomb crash landing in India and a coup led by the Pakistani Foreign Minister to overthrow the Prime Minister of Pakistan. As a result, Dalton executes the Render Safe plan to secure nuclear missile sites in Pakistan.
- As a result of his ambitious, successful peace deals with Iran and Cuba, as well as the Hizb al-Shahid attack in Washington D.C. and the Buckley Trade, Dalton is challenged for the Republican party nomination in 2016 by Pennsylvania Governor Sam Evans. Although he initially led Evans in the primary polls, a radical shift on foreign policy to include acceptance of climate change as a national security issue, the changing of alliances in the Middle East, and Dalton's earlier foreign policy achievements allow Evans to portray Dalton as soft on defense to the Republican base and win the party nomination over Dalton.
- Faced with being only the second President in US history to lose his party nomination for a second term (after Franklin Pierce in 1856), Dalton is convinced by Secretary McCord and Chief of Staff Russell Jackson to run in the general election as an independent candidate to preserve his legacy and stop Evans and isolationist Democratic nominee Fred Reynolds's actions.
- Party: Independent

=== President Jessica Danforth ===
- President in The Beekeeper.
- Former businesswoman and owner of multi-billion dollar government contractor firm Danforth Enterprises.
- Her son (and successor as CEO) Derek Danforth conspired with former CIA Director Wallace Westwyld to use Danforth Enterprises subsidiary companies and proprietary CIA data mining software to target and financially scam thousands of innocent people. This not only enriched the company, but also helped finance her ultimately successful presidential campaign.
- When she confronts her son in their Massachusetts estate and threatens to go public about his illegal actions, he murders FBI Deputy Director Jackson Prigg in a drug induced rage and threatens to kill her as well.
- Ultimately, she is saved by a rogue former black ops agent, who was tracking Derek and kills him as vengeance for the death of a friend, one of the scam victims who committed suicide.
- Political Party: Independent
- Portrayed by: Jemma Redgrave

=== President Danny Daniels ===
- President in: Steve Berry's Cotton Malone series of novels.
- Fictionally assumed to have been elected in 2004 and re-elected in 2008 in an alternate timeline where George W. Bush's second term and Barack Obama's first term do not happen.

=== President Eliot Daniels ===
- President in: The Russian Woman by Tom Hyman (1983 novel).
- Survives an attack on his motorcade in which the Soviet Premier is killed.
- His wife is mentally ill, and he falls in love with a Russian woman, a spy for the KGB.
- Seriously injured during a fire at the White House.

=== President Noah Daniels ===
- President in: 24 (2009–2013)
- Previously served as the governor of Tennessee (2003–2008) and as a senator from Tennessee (1977–1995)
- Vice President to Wayne Palmer
- When Palmer is severely injured in an assassination attempt, Daniels takes over as acting president.
- Palmer assumes office again for a few hours and asks for Daniels' resignation over Daniels' plan to launch a nuke at Hamri Al-Assad's country in order to stop Fayed from detonating another bomb on US soil. Palmer collapses during a press conference soon after and Daniels assumes office as Acting President.
- Serves out the rest of Palmer's term after Palmer's death and loses re-election to Allison Taylor in the 2012 presidential elections.
- Played by: Powers Boothe
- Party: Democratic

=== President Linda Danvers ===
- President in: Action Comics 344 (Dec 1966) and 345 (Jan 1967)
- Supergirl travels to an alternate reality where teenagers are in charge. While Supergirl is unpopular, Linda Danvers is elected President of the Union of American States.

=== President Paul Davenport ===
- President in: First Kid
- Played by: James Naughton

=== President Nadja Daviar ===
- President in: Shadowrun
- Serves term in 2064
- 9th UCAS President | 55th US President
- First elf to be President of the UCAS.
- Daviar succeeds President Kyle Haeffner after his death during the November 3 coup staged by The New Revolution. She declares martial law and ruthlessly stamps out the coup within 24 hours.
- She is succeeded by Senate President Pro Tempore Gene Simone after she goes missing.

President Jefferson Davis

- President Of The Confederate States Of America (1861-1865)

=== President Jason Davidson ===
- President in: Decker
- Former U.S. Senator.
- Succeeded in office by Jack Decker
- Played by: Joe Estevez

=== President Jason Davidson, Jr. ===
- President in Decker
- Son of a U.S. president.
- Elected in 2072.
- Played by: Joe Estevez

=== President Floyd Davis ===
- President in: Cowboy Angels by Paul J. McAuley (2008 novel)
- Serves term from 1977 to 1981
- Davis continues his predecessor's policy of using the Turing Gates that allow travel to parallel dimensions to intervene in events in other Americas.
- Defeated by Jimmy Carter in the 1980 presidential election.

=== President Frederick Davis ===
- President in: Convention by Fletcher Knebel (1964 novel).
- Davis does not run for re-election due to ill health.

=== President Gordon Davis ===
- President in: Protect and Defend by Eric L. Harry
- Davis was an African-American Senator from Maryland prior to his nomination as Governor Phil Bristol's running-mate. Davis is wounded in the assassination of President-elect Bristol and later sworn in from his hospital room. He presides over a war between China and U.N. forces over control of Siberia.
- Party: Republican

=== President Jack Davis ===
- President in: Revolution
- Former United States Secretary of Defense
- Evacuated to Guantanamo Bay Naval Base six months after the blackout
- Davis has the vice president assassinated in order to become president, as the president, the Speaker of the United States House of Representatives and everyone else ahead of him died in the crash of Air Force One when the blackout hit, to fulfill his goals of reshaping the United States in his own image.
- Killed by Charlie Matheson in the comic series

=== President Browning Dayton ===
- President at the end of: The Zero Factor by William Oscar Johnson (1980 novel)
- Dayton is the Vice President to Augustus Alvin York, a Republican nominated in Chicago as the candidate for president when the convention for the 1980 election is hopelessly deadlocked with Ronald Reagan and other nominees. After dozens of ballots, York is a compromise/sacrificial nomination.
- York wins the 1980 election, but then becomes rather obsessed with the Zero Factor for presidents, where all presidents elected in a year ending in Zero since 1840 have died in office. York fears he will be next in 1980. After multiple attempts on his life, York suffers severe stress, and finds freedom from the Zero Factor by resigning and turning the presidency over to Browning Dayton.
- Party: Republican

=== President Hamilton "Ham" Delbacher ===
- President in: The Hill of Summer and The Roads of Earth
- Sitting Vice President, on the verge of being asked to leave the coming year's ticket, who succeeds to the presidency after his unnamed predecessor dies on the Fourth of July.
- Despite enormous personal criticism at home and abroad, he defies plans by Yuri Serapin, the dictator of the Soviet Union, to undermine the west.
- Delbacher survives an assassination attempt by a false KGB defector inside the White House.
- He presides over the disintegration of the Soviet Union, but is disappointed when the People's Republic of China begins assimilating Soviet Asian territory, including Siberia.

=== President Jack Decker ===
- President in: Decker
- Dies on July 4. 2076.

=== President Demsky ===
- President in: Alien Apocalypse (2005 film)
- President Demsky escapes Washington, D.C., before it was destroyed by alien invaders.
- Seen as a mythic figure leading the resistance to the invaders, Demsky is found by astronauts who have returned to Earth, in hiding with other former government officials and with no interest in fighting.
- Inspired by the astronauts, Demsky joins them in beginning an actual resistance.
- Played by: Peter Jason
- Party: Republican

=== President Dennings ===
- President in: "Time Angels" (NTSF:SD:SUV::).
- First female president
- Her husband is killed in 1975 by time travelers in an attempt to prevent the birth of her nuclear terrorist disk jockey son.
- Taken back in time to confront time villain Leonardo da Vinci
- Killed by time travelers before she becomes president to prevent the nuclear destruction of San Diego in the future.
- Played by: Tara Copeland

=== President Tom Dering ===
- President in: Justin Richards' novels Doctor Who: Option Lock and Doctor Who: Millennium Shock
- Dering's running mate was Jack Michaels; Dering defeats Bill Clinton in the 1996 presidential election.

=== President William Matthew 'Will' Derringer ===
- President in Heads of State
- Former model and Hollywood actor who gained fame for starring in the Water Cobra series of action movies. In his first term during the events of the film and experiencing high approval ratings.
- Married to First Lady Catherine 'Cat' Derringer and has one child, First Daughter Sawyer Derringer.
- Administration includes Vice President Elizabeth Kirk and White House Chief of Staff Simone Bradshaw.
- Develops a rivalry with UK Prime Minister Sam Clarke, a former British Army soldier who endorsed his election opponent.
- Is in office when operatives working for Russian arms dealer Viktor Gradov are able to gain access to Echelon, a top secret NSA surveillance program, after intercepting a CIA operation in Spain. Gradov subsequently leaks numerous classified state secrets, exposing various NATO member states as having committed espionage against each other.
- Gradov intends to destabilise the alliance after they sanctioned the killing of his son, a nuclear energy scientist, and later stole his proprietary technology for their own uses.
- Along with Clarke, he survives an attack on Air Force One when it is shot down over Belarus whilst en route to a NATO conference in Trieste by terrorists working Gradov.
- Crosses into Poland with Clarke, where the two are briefly taken into protective custody at a CIA safehouse in Warsaw. When this is also attacked by Gradov's men, they are transported to Trieste by MI6 agent Noel Bisset.
- Vice President Kirk, now Acting President and involved in the conspiracy, attempts to have corrupt United States Secret Service agents take Derringer into custody and kill him in The Beast. These efforts are thwarted by Bisset and Prime Minister Clarke, who save Derringer and are able to transport him safely to the NATO summit.
- Just before the alliance dissolves, Derringer interjects and reveals Kirks treachery, with the latter confessing she wished for NATO to dissolve due to disproportionate funding from the US. Gradov and his men attack the conference, killing Kirk. Derringer and Clarke are ultimately able to defeat Gradov by destroying his helicopter as he tries to flee.
- Played by: John Cena
- Political party: Unspecified (implied to be Republican)

=== President Deutscher ===
- President in: A Sound of Thunder by Ray Bradbury
- A fascist candidate who in the "original" timeline was defeated in 2055 by the more moderate Keith, but becomes the president in an alternate timeline when a time traveler steps on a butterfly and caused a wave of historical changes.

=== President Devlin ===
- President in: Spy Kids 3-D: Game Over
- Played by: George Clooney
- Devlin appeared in the first Spy Kids film, but he was not president then. Spy Kids 2: The Island of Lost Dreams featured an unnamed president played by Christopher McDonald.

=== President Devonian ===
- Former president referenced in Thank You for Smoking by Christopher Buckley.

=== President DeVore ===
- President in: Crisis
- His teenage son is kidnapped along with the students of Ballard High School, attended by the children of Washington, D.C.'s elite.
- Portrayed by: John Allen Nelson

=== President Dexter ===
- President in: Saturday Night Live
- During his first term, a crisis occurs because he had mustard on his chin. In his second term, it is revealed that he is illiterate.
- Played by: Charlton Heston

=== President Isabel Diaz ===
- President in: Born to Run, The Trusted, and The Tao Deception by John M. Green
- First woman to win the White House, and first Hispanic.
- Party: Republican, with a Democrat vice-president.

=== President Robert Diaz ===
- President on: The Blacklist
- Played by: Benito Martinez
- While running for election, he kills a teenager in a drunk driving crash. Desperate, he accepts a large campaign donation of illicit money from corrupt businessman Alexander Kirk to hire a professional cleaner.
- He is blackmailed over accepting Kirk's dirty money by Raymond Reddington into providing a full pardon to Elizabeth Keen over her killing of the corrupt Attorney General.
- While preparing for re-election, his wife begs him to publicly confess to the death of the teenager. Diaz conspires with his Chief of Staff Ana McMahon to have the First Lady assassinated by a Secret Service agent.
- Reddington and the Blacklist task force intervene to save the First Lady and expose Diaz's crimes, leading to his downfall and arrest.

=== President C. Douglas Dillion ===
- President in: Resurrection Day by Brendan Dubois
- Secretary of the Treasury during the Cuban Missile Crisis, and is the highest ranking cabinet member to survive the nuclear exchange.
- Party: Republican (although served in a Democratic Cabinet).

=== President Douglass Dilman ===
- President in: The Man
- First African-American President
- Previously served as President Pro Tempore of the United States Senate, a position he was given as a form of tokenism
- Succeeds to the presidency after President Fenton and the Speaker of the House are killed in an accident in Frankfurt, West Germany, and Vice President Noah Calvin refuses to assume the office due to poor health.
- Dilman is initially manipulated by Secretary of State Arthur Eaton, who wants to orchestrate Dilman's downfall to take his place.
- He oversees the criminal extradition of Robert Wheeler to South Africa for attempting to kill a politician there, which upsets his political activist daughter, Wanda.
- In the novel he decides not to run for re-election. In the film, he is last seen walking on stage at the national convention.
- Played by: James Earl Jones (film)

=== President Trick E. Dixon ===
- President in: Our Gang
- Parody of Richard Nixon inspired by Nixon's statement about his opposition to abortion based on his belief in "the sanctity of human life".

=== President Joe Doakes ===
- President in: Mathematicians in Love

=== President John Doe aka Tempus ===
- President in: "Meet John Doe" and "Lois and Clarks" (Lois & Clark: The New Adventures of Superman)
- Played by: Lane Davies

=== President Joseph Donahue ===
- President in: Rides a Pale Horse by Franklin Allen Lieb.
- Former U.S. Senator from Connecticut and vice president under President Tolliver.
- Becomes president after Tolliver is assassinated.
- Donahue ends Tolliver's campaign against terrorist states, but the result is seen as weakness and a nuclear war nearly begins.

=== President Jack Donnelly ===
- President in: The KGB Candidate by Owen Sela (1988 novel)
- Elected in 1980, and re-elected in 1984.
- Strongly anti-Communist.
- Party: Republican

=== President Kevin J. Donnelly ===
- President in: The General's President by John Dalmas
- Native of Colorado.
- Served as vice president under President Wheeler, and takes over as president after Wheeler's death
- After a stock market crash in 1994 throws the United States and the rest of the world into turmoil, he works with the United States Congress to institute several emergency measures to combat growing unrest.
- Donnelly is left physically and emotionally drained during his time in office during the unrest, becoming so ill he has to be permanently accompanied by members of the Medical Corps.
- Donnelly wanted to resign due to the stress, and chooses to appoint Chairman of the Joint Chiefs of Staff General Thomas M. "Jumper" Cromwell as vice president to succeed him, having forced the previous vice president's resignation after a scandal. Cromwell recommends Donnelly appoint Arne Haugen to take over the office. Donnelly uses the emergency powers to appoint Haugen to the office of vice president without the need for congressional approval, and then immediately resigns, causing Haugen to ascend to the office of the president.
- After his resignation, President Donnelly is taken to Bethesda Naval Hospital for treatment.

=== President Robert Donovan ===
- President in: The President's Man by Nicholas Guild (1982 novel)
- Vice president to President Faircliffe, and becomes president when Faircliffe dies in office.
- Donovan is later informed that Faircliffe was a traitor.

=== President Victor von Doom ===
- President in issues 29-33 of Doom 2099, and other Marvel 2099 titles.
- Dictator of the fictional country Latveria, Doom arrives in the year 2099. Seeing the damage being done to the world by American mega-corporations, Doom invades America and installs himself as president by "right of revolution".

=== President Jonathan Doors ===
- President in: Earth: Final Conflict
- He is president in an illusion created by aliens.

=== President Douchebag ===
- President in: Stewie Griffin: The Untold Story
- His two-term presidency caused the meaning of the word "douchebag" to change. His opponent is identified as Senator Daterape.

=== President Matt Douglas ===
- President in: My Fellow Americans
- Former governor of Indiana
- Douglas runs against Senator Russell P. Kramer of Ohio and loses, but he defeats Kramer four years later in a landslide. Douglas is later defeated by Kramer's vice president, William Haney. Douglas later ran again for office as an independent alongside Kramer. He has a reputation as a womanizer and is married to Katherine Douglas.
- Played by: James Garner
- Party: Independent, formerly Democratic

=== President Thomas Douglas ===
- President in: The Puppet Masters
- Played by: Tom Mason

=== President Ilene Dover ===
- President in: Hunter Killer
- First female president
- She oversees a US naval operation to rescue the kidnapped President of Russia.
- Played by: Caroline Goodall

=== President Arthur Downing ===
- President in: President of the North American Confederacy in The Probability Broach, as part of the North American Confederacy Series by L. Neil Smith, in which the United States becomes a Libertarian state after a successful Whiskey Rebellion and George Washington being overthrown and executed by firing squad for treason in 1794.
- Serves as the twelfth president from 1856 to 1859.
- Dies in office in 1859. He is the fifth president to die or be killed while in office after George Washington, Thomas Jefferson, James Monroe, and Sequoyah Guess.
- Succeeded by Harriet Beecher Stowe, who serves from 1859 to 1860.

=== President Connor Doyle ===
- President in: The People's Choice by Jeff Greenfield.
- He is chosen by the voters after President-Elect MacArthur Foyle's death.
- Former U.S. Congressman
- Party: Republican

=== President Howard T. Duck ===
- President on Earth-65 in the Marvel Universe
- A human based on Howard the Duck

=== President Michael Dugan ===
- President in: Command & Conquer: Red Alert 2 and Command & Conquer: Yuri's Revenge
- He leads the nation during a Soviet invasion of the United States that ignites World War III. He is still president on June 30, 1972, when the first phase of the war ends.
- Played by: Ray Wise

=== President Michael Dukakis ===
- President in: Shadowrun
- Party: Democratic

=== President Jonathan Lincoln Duncan ===
- President in: The President is Missing

=== President Dunkelzahn ===
- President in: Shadowrun
- Serves in 2057
- 7th UCAS President | 53rd US President
- Dies in a limousine explosion 10 hours, 23 minutes, and 8 seconds after being sworn in as president, however he likely orchestrated this explosion.
- Preceded by President Betty Jo Pritchard
- Succeeded by VP Kyle Haeffner

=== President Sam Dunne ===
- President in: Touched by an Angel
- Played by: David Hart

=== President Helen Du Pray ===
- President in: The Fourth K
- Vice President to President Francis Xavier Kennedy who is assassinated on Inauguration Day of his second term.

=== President Charles Carter Durant ===
- President in: Earth II
- Played by: Lew Ayres

=== President Vanessa Durksen ===
- President in: Red Planet Blues by Robert J. Sawyer
- Her body is fatally shot by a crazed gunman during her second term, but her mind is uploaded to an artificial body, which serves for the remainder of the term.
- She is the subject of the fictional Supreme Court case Durksen v. Hawksorth, which established that legal personhood is transferred to an artificial body when consciousness is transferred.

=== President Roger Durling ===
- President in: Debt of Honor
- Former governor of California, he succeeds to the presidency after his predecessor resigns.
- Served in Vietnam with the 82nd Airborne Division.
- Appoints Jack Ryan as his vice president, before being killed in a terrorist attack on the Capitol.
