= President Curtis =

President Curtis from Rick and Morty may refer to:

- President Curtis (Rick and Morty character), the character from Rick and Morty
- President Curtis (TV series), a spin-off of Rick and Morty featuring the character of the same name
