= The President's Daughter =

The President's Daughter may refer to:

- The President's Daughter (novel), a 2021 novel by Bill Clinton and James Patterson
- The President's Daughter (Britton), a 1928 book by Nan Britton
- The President's Daughter (White), a 1984 novel by Ellen Emerson White
- The President's Daughter series, a series of books by White
- Clotel; or, The President's Daughter, an 1853 novel by William Wells Brown
- The President's Daughter (film), a South Korean film with Namkoong Won
- The President's Daughter (Higgins), a 1997 book by Jack Higgins
