= Female president of the United States in popular culture =

The idea of a female president has been explored by various writers in novels (including science fiction), films and television, (Note: All listed movies and television shows are American unless otherwise stated.) as well as other media. Numerous actors have portrayed a female president. Such portrayals have occurred in both serious works and comedies.

No real woman has been elected president of the United States before.

== Film and television ==
=== 1924–2010 ===
- The 1924 silent science-fiction film The Last Man on Earth shows a woman as president of the United States; in the movie, all adult men die of disease.
- In the 1932 animated short Betty Boop for President, Betty Boop, voiced by Mae Questel, runs for and wins the presidency of the United States.
- In the 1948 animated short Olive Oyl for President, a dream sequence shows Olive Oyl, voiced by Mae Questel, successfully running for president of the United States, after which she makes married men exempt from taxes in the hopes that Popeye will propose.
- In Project Moonbase, a 1953 science-fiction film, Ernestine Barrier plays a female president of the United States.
- In the 1964 comedy film Kisses for My President, Polly Bergen plays Leslie McCloud, the first female president of the United States. Leslie eventually becomes pregnant and resigns the presidency.
- In the 1985 sitcom Hail to the Chief, Patty Duke plays the first female president of the United States.
- In the 1986 British satire film Whoops Apocalypse, Loretta Swit plays Barbara Adams, the first female president of the United States.
- In the 1987 Australian film Les Patterson Saves the World, Joan Rivers plays the president of the United States.
- In the 1989 time-travel film Back to the Future Part II, there is a USA Today newspaper from 2015, in which one of the headlines is "PRESIDENT SAYS SHE'S TIRED of reporters asking same questions".
- The 1990 television movie Hitler's Daughter has a female American president who is the fictional daughter of Adolf Hitler.
- In the television show Clarissa Explains It All (1991–1994), the title character, played by Melissa Joan Hart, repeatedly imagines Chelsea Clinton becoming President of the United States.
- The 1992 Lifetime television movie Majority Rule features Blair Brown playing Katherine Taylor, the president of the United States.
- In the pilot to the 1992 television series X-Men: The Animated Series, a female president of the United States is briefly shown.
- In the 1993 episode "The Last Temptation of Homer" of the television series The Simpsons, Homer's guardian angel shows him how life would be if Homer was married to Mindy, which includes Marge being the president of the United States.
- In a 1994 episode of the television show RoboCop, called "Public Enemies", a female president of the United States faces an assassination plot against her.
- In the 1995 episode "The Weaker Sex" of the television series Sliders, Teresa Barnwell plays Hillary Clinton as the president of the United States in an alternative universe where women are in charge.
- In the 1996 television movie Special Report: Journey to Mars, Elizabeth Wilson plays President Elizabeth Richardson, whose support of a mission to Mars gets her re-elected. The mission is sabotaged, causing crisis.
- In the 1998 comedy film Mafia!, Christina Applegate plays United States President Diane Steen. This character is a parody of Diane Keaton's character in the film series The Godfather, and she almost accomplishes world peace but is distracted by her boyfriend, a mobster.
- In the 1999 film Zenon: Girl of the 21st Century, a Disney Channel original film set in the year 2049, Chelsea Clinton is the president of the United States.
- In the 2000 film Chain of Command, Vice President Gloria Valdez, played by María Conchita Alonso, becomes president.
- In the 2000 episode "Bart to the Future" of the television show The Simpsons, Bart looks 30 years into the future, at which time Lisa Simpson, voiced by Yeardley Smith, has become President of the United States after succeeding Donald Trump. (In actuality, Donald Trump was elected President of the United States in 2016 and 2024.) In the episode, Lisa states that she is "proud to be America's first straight female president", and it is implied that Chaz Bono, at the time still identifying as a lesbian, had previously been president.
- In the 2000 episode "The Election" of the television series Arthur, Muffy Crosswire, voiced by Melissa Altro, is shown to become president of the United States in the future.
- In the 2001–2010 TV series 24, Cherry Jones plays the president of the United States. President Allison Taylor, whom she plays, takes office in the 2008 TV movie, 24: Redemption, and serves in Season 7 and Season 8. At the end of season 8, Taylor resigns and goes to prison.
- In the 2001 American-Argentinian science-fiction film Perfect Lover, set in 2030, the world is run by women and Sally Champlin plays the female president of the United States. The film begins with her saying, "I did not have sexual relations with that young man", similar to an actual quote by President Bill Clinton.
- In CBS's 2004 TV series Century City Oprah Winfrey is said to be the president of the United States, but is never shown.
- The 2005–2006 television series Commander in Chief focused on the fictional administration and family of Mackenzie Allen, played by Geena Davis, who is the first female president of the United States.
- In the 2005–2009 television series Prison Break, Patricia Wettig plays Vice President Caroline Reynolds, who becomes President of the United States after she arranges the assassination of the former president.
- In the 2006 French miniseries L'État de Grace, Peggy Frankston plays Hillary Clinton, who is shown as the president of the United States in two episodes.
- Anjelica Huston plays a corrupt president of the United States in the miniseries Covert One: The Hades Factor, which aired on CBS in 2006.
- A 2006 BBC Four television adaptation of John Wyndham's Random Quest depicts the main character being sucked into an alternative reality in which Condoleezza Rice is president of the United States.
- In the 2008 miniseries XIII: The Conspiracy, Mimi Kuzyk plays Sally Sheridan, the first female president of the United States, who is assassinated in a conspiracy.
- In ABC's 2008–2009 TV series Life on Mars it is hinted that Malia Obama is the president of the United States in 2035.
- In the 2010 film Airline Disaster, Meredith Baxter plays the president.

=== 2011–present ===
- In the television show Homeland (2011-2020), Elizabeth Marvel plays President Elizabeth Keane.
- In the television show Scandal (2012-2018), Bellamy Young plays Melody "Mellie" Margaret Grant, who is elected the first female president after the assassination of President-elect Francisco Vargas on election night. In the final episode, it is suggested that Olivia Pope might have also become President..
- In the movie Iron Sky (2012), Stephanie Paul plays a female president who is a Sarah Palin-esque parody. She reprised her role in the 2019 sequel Iron Sky: The Coming Race.
- In the television show Veep (2012-2019), Julia Louis-Dreyfus plays VP Selina Meyer, who becomes the 45th president of the United States after the incumbent resigns to look after his wife with mental health conditions. Meyer's successor, Laura Montez (Andrea Savage) is also a woman and the running mate of opposition candidate Bill O'Brian.
- In the television series Air Force One Is Down (2013), Linda Hamilton plays President Harriet Rowntree, who is kidnapped from Air Force One.
- In the television show House of Cards (2013-2018), Robin Wright plays Claire Underwood, who becomes the U.S. President after the resignation of her husband, Frank Underwood.
- In the television show Madam Secretary (2014-2019), Téa Leoni plays Elizabeth McCord, the United States Secretary of State, who in the final season is shown to have won the presidential election after a flash-forward from the previous season.
- In the television show State of Affairs (2014-2015), Alfre Woodard plays Constance Payton, the first Black female president of the US.
- In the animated movie Justice League: Gods and Monsters (2015), Penny Johnson Jerald plays President Amanda Waller in an unspecified alternative universe.
- In the television show Quantico (2015-2018), Marcia Cross plays Claire Haas, who becomes President after the incumbent steps down.
- In the 2015 Spanish animated film Capture the Flag, there is a female president of the United States.
- In the television show Supergirl (2015-2021), Lynda Carter plays President Olivia Marsdin.
- In the 2016 Legends of Tomorrow episode of the Arrowverse crossover event "Invasion!", which event involved the television shows Supergirl, The Flash, Arrow and Legends of Tomorrow, Lucia Walters plays President Susan Brayden in an alternate timeline.
- In the movie Independence Day: Resurgence (2016), Sela Ward plays Elizabeth Lanford, the 45th and first female president of the US, who is in her first term, succeeding Thomas J. Whitmore, William Grey, and Lucas Jacobs. She is eventually killed by an alien queen.
- In a sketch called "Madame President" in a May 2016 episode of the television show Inside Amy Schumer, Schumer plays President Schinton, who has her period on her first day as president and does poorly because of it.
- In the 2016 television movie Peg + Cat Save the World, Sandra Oh plays the president.
- In the movie The Purge: Election Year (2016), Elizabeth Mitchell plays Senator Charlie Roan, who is elected president on the platform of ending the Annual Purge, after barely surviving the night herself.
- In the episode "21C" of the television show Travelers (2016-2018), the Travelers are tasked with the protection of Anna Hamilton, a child who will later go on to become president.
- In the second season of the television show Modus (2017), Kim Cattrall plays President Helen Tyler, who disappears during a state visit to Sweden.
- In the 2018 film An Acceptable Loss, Jamie Lee Curtis plays Rachel Burke, who rises to the presidency after ordering a nuclear launch while vice president.
- In the film Hunter Killer (2018), Caroline Goodall plays President Ilene Dover.
- Jeannie Berlin plays President Cecily Burke in the television show The First (2018), which focuses on the first human mission to Mars.
- In the television show For All Mankind, which premiered in 2019, Jodi Balfour plays the first female president, Ellen Wilson, a former astronaut who is also gay.
- In the 2019 film Long Shot, Charlotte Field, played by Charlize Theron, becomes the first female president of the United States in 2021.
- In a 2020 episode of the television show The Good Fight, titled "The Gang Deals with Alternate Reality", in an alternate reality Hillary Clinton is serving as the President of the United States after winning the 2016 presidential election.
- In the television show Diary of a Future President (2020-2021), Gina Rodriguez plays President Elena Cañero-Reed, a Cuban American who recounts her youth and path to the presidency after finding an old diary.
- The 2020 film Superintelligence features Jean Smart playing the president.
- In the episode "The Rad Awesome Terrific Ray" of the 2020 Hulu animated television series Solar Opposites, former First Lady Michelle Obama is president in an alternate timeline.
- In the 2020 television special Xavier Riddle and the Secret Movie: I Am Madam President, a girl named Yadina Riddle becomes president of the United States in the future.
- In 2021, the movie Don't Look Up was released, in which Meryl Streep plays a president not bothered by an upcoming comet strike.
- In an episode of the television show The Simpsons titled "Mother And Child Reunion" (2021), Werner Herzog predicts that Lisa Simpson will be president in the future, which the episode depicts.
- In the television show Y: The Last Man (2021), Diane Lane plays Jennifer Brown, a congresswoman and chair of the House Intelligence Committee who was elevated to the presidency after the death of every mammal with a Y chromosome except for her son Yorick and his pet capuchin monkey Ampersand.
- The 2022 Netflix film Interceptor features a female president played by Zoe Carides.
- In the film Red, White & Royal Blue (2023), Uma Thurman plays Ellen Claremont, the incumbent president running for re-election and mother of the protagonist, Alex Claremont-Diaz. (Note: The film is based on the novel Red, White & Royal Blue by Casey McQuiston.)
- In The Night Agent (a television show which premiered in 2023), the President is Michelle Travers, played by Kari Matchett.
- In the 2023 Tubi film DC Down, Sean Young plays the president, who is trapped in the White House after an earthquake.
- In The Diplomat, a television show which premiered in 2023, Allison Janney plays Grace Penn, a vice president who becomes president after the president dies.
- Jemma Redgrave plays President Jessica Danforth in the film The Beekeeper (2024).
- In the film G20, released in 2025, Viola Davis plays President Danielle Sutton, who fights terrorists.
- In 2025, Angela Bassett appeared as President Evelyn Mitchell in the Netflix television show Zero Day.

== Music ==
- In the 2017 music video for "Family Feud", a song by Jay-Z, Irene Bedard plays a future co-president of the United States.
- In 2017, a song called "First Woman President" about a fictional first female president of the United States was released by Jonathan Mann. The song depicts the female president as having an all-female Cabinet and liberal policies (e.g. "paid family leave for both Mom and Dad"), and the singer says it is easy to be proud of his country under her presidency.
- The 2020 music video for Ariana Grande's song "Positions" depicts Grande as the president of the United States.

== Novels ==
- In the 1932 book A New Day Dawns by Charles Eliot Blanchard, Jane B. Stanton, a fictional descendant of Elizabeth Cady Stanton, is elected president in 1962. She is a eugenicist, initiating a totalitarian and racist regime.
- In 1937, the play A Woman of Destiny was turned into a novel set in 1943. In it Constance Goodwin leaves the presidency to be a grandmother.
- The 1952 novel The Dark Mare, by Damsey Wilson, is about the presidency of Miriam Hall Bradley.
- In the 1959 science-fiction novel Alas, Babylon by Pat Frank, President Josephine Vannebuker-Brown, formerly the secretary of Health, Education, and Welfare, becomes President of the United States because she was the only member of the presidential line of succession to survive nuclear war.
- In the 1979 science fiction novel The Probability Broach by L. Neil Smith, it is briefly mentioned that "Harriet Beecher" became president in 1859 after "Downing" died in office, and that Beecher advocated banning alcohol.
- Ellen Emerson White's 1984 novel The President's Daughter is about the first female president, from the perspective of her daughter; the book was the start of a series by White about the same situation.
- In 2004, Mark Dunlea, assistant campaign manager for Sonia Johnson's presidential campaign in 1984, wrote a novel about a fictional female American president, Madame President: The Unauthorized Biography of the First Green Party President.
- The 2004 novel Weapons of Choice by John Birmingham features the U.S.S. Hillary Clinton, named after "the most uncompromising wartime president in the history of the United States".
- The 2010 novel Eighteen Acres (a reference to the 18 acres on which the White House complex sits), by Nicolle Wallace, is about three powerful women: the first female American president Charlotte Kramer, her chief of staff, and a White House correspondent.
- In the 2011 novel 11/22/63, by Stephen King, although not the Hulu adaptation of it, there is an alternate timeline with a President Hillary Clinton.
- The 2015 novel Duplicity, by Newt Gingrich and Pete Earley, features a woman who becomes America's first female president and chooses politics over national interest, resulting in a "Benghazi style attack".
- In the 2019 novel Red, White & Royal Blue, by Casey McQuiston, Ellen Claremont is the first female president of the United States, and she is running for a second term as president in 2020. (Note: Red, White & Royal Blue would later be made into a film in 2023.)
- In the novel Rodham by Curtis Sittenfeld, published in 2020, Hillary Rodham becomes president.
- In the 2022 novel Presidential by Lola Keeley, the United States President is Constance "Connie" Calvin, who is openly bisexual and causes a scandal by beginning a relationship with her son's lesbian physician.

Other novels which feature a female president of the United States include:

- Robert Bloch's Ladies' Day (1968)
- Jeffrey Archer's Shall We Tell the President? (originally published in 1977 with a male president; after the success of Kane and Abel and The Prodigal Daughter, Archer published a revised edition of Shall We Tell the President?, replacing President Ted Kennedy with President Florentyna Kane (who became president in The Prodigal Daughter) in order to link it with the other two novels.)
- Robert Anton Wilson's Schrödinger's Cat Trilogy (1979)
- Jeffrey Archer's The Prodigal Daughter (1982)
- Carl Sagan's Contact (1985)
- John Shirley's cyberpunk Eclipse Trilogy (1985–1990)
- Roy Blount Jr.'s First Hubby (1990)
- Jack McDevitt's Moonfall (1998)
- Arthur C. Clarke and Stephen Baxter's The Light of Other Days (2001)
- K.A. Applegate's series Remnants (2001–2003)
- Allen Steele's series Coyote (2002–2011)
- Arthur C. Clarke and Stephen Baxter's Sunstorm (2005)
- Robert J. Sawyer's Red Planet Blues (2013)
- Erwin Hargrove's The Woman President (2016)

== Other media ==
Some American stand-up comedians, such as Ted Alexandro and Chaunté Wayans, have joked about a fictional female president of the United States and done an impression of such a woman.

- The 1931 play A Woman of Destiny features a woman named Constance Goodwin who becomes president when a male president dies. (Note: In 1937, the play was turned into a novel.)
- There is a female president of the United States in the 1939 science-fiction short story Greater Than Gods, by C.L. Moore.
- In the seventh issue of Wonder Woman, from 1943, there is a story where a woman, Arda Moore, is president of the United States, and another story where Arda Moore is president and later Wonder Woman herself becomes president as Wonder Woman's alter ego, Diana Prince.
- A 1949 musical As the Girls Go, played on Broadway and set in 1953, (Note: The musical was originally titled The First Gentleman of the Land.) is a comedy about the "First Husband" of a female president.
- In the 1985 National Lampoon article "Rose, Rose, There She Goes...Into the Bushes to Take Off Her Clothes", written by Shary Flenniken, Rose Ambrose becomes the vice president of the United States because she is having an affair with the president. Ambrose later becomes president of the United States herself after the former president dies of a heart attack while having sex. Ambrose is eventually shot and killed by several people, including the former first lady.
- In the 1992 anthology Alternate Presidents, there is a story titled "We Are Not Amused", by Laura Resnick, about Victoria Woodhull as president, and a story titled "Love Our Lockwood", by Janet Kagan, about Belva Lockwood as president.
- An ad campaign for Donna Karan in 1992 called "In Women We Trust" featured model Rosemary McGrotha as a female president of the United States.
- In a 1993 Slovenian clothing commercial, Melanija Knavs plays the first female president of the United States on the day she is inaugurated. (Note: Knavs would later become First Lady of the United States as Melania Trump.) The character is meant to be President of the United States, although the European Union flag is mistakenly used in place of the American flag.
- In 1996, Kenneth Cole produced an advertisement with the text "The future is what you make it...Voters in the year 2016 will prove that a woman's place is in the house...The White House", and another advertisement with the text "No longer plagued by cold feet, voters in the year 2016 proved that a woman's place is in the house, the White House."
- In the 2003 science-fiction comic book series Y: The Last Man, by Brian K. Vaughan, Pia Guerra, and José Marzán Jr., United States Secretary of Agriculture Margaret Valentine becomes the president after a plague kills all the men; she later wins reelection because Oprah Winfrey was not available.
- In the alternate universe story X-Men: The End (2004-2006) Kitty Pryde becomes the first mutant president, and has a First Lady.
- In the 2010 video game Vanquish, Elizabeth Winters is President of the United States. She is voiced by Lee Meriwether.
- In the 2010 video game Tom Clancy's Splinter Cell: Conviction, and its 2013 sequel, Tom Clancy's Splinter Cell: Blacklist, there is a female president of the United States named Patricia Caldwell.
- In 2012, the first President Barbie was released.
- The 2012 video game Call of Duty: Black Ops II features a female president of the United States named Marion Bosworth.
- In the 2013 video game Saints Row IV, the customizable player character, who is the president, can be female.
- In 2015, DC published a miniseries about a teenage girl named Beth Ross who is elected President via Twitter in the year 2036.
- In 2016, an ad campaign for Elie Tahari called "Madam President" featured Shlomit Malka as a female president of the United States. Tahari intended this campaign to be an endorsement of Hillary Clinton, saying, "We have a choice between a man and a woman, and the woman is smarter and more humble, and I wanted to say I support that."
- In 2018, The New York Times published two stories written as if reporting on the 2020 presidential election results. In one of the stories, Elizabeth Warren wins against Donald Trump and becomes the first female president of the United States. (One of the two The New York Times stories was titled "How Trump Won Re-election in 2020", by Bret Stephens, and the other was titled "How Trump Lost Re-election in 2020", by David Leonhardt. In both stories, Elizabeth Warren was said to be Donald Trump's opponent in that election.)
- The 2018 video game Detroit: Become Human features a female president of the United States, voiced by Christina Batman and, in Japanese, Atsuko Tanaka.
- In the 2019 video game Death Stranding, Bridget Strand is the first female president of the United States, which she renames to the United Cities of America.
- The 2021 children's picture book Dear Mrs. President, by author Ana Maria Medici and illustrator Nurit Benchetrit Motchan, is about a child's letter to the first female president of the United States.
- In the 2022 play The 47th by Mike Bartlett, Kamala Harris becomes the 47th president of the United States.

== See also ==
- African-American presidents of the United States in popular culture
- List of actors who have played the president of the United States
- List of female United States presidential and vice presidential candidates
- List of presidents of the United States
- Lists of fictional presidents of the United States
- President of the United States in fiction
