= President of the United States (disambiguation) =

The president of the United States (POTUS) is the chief executive of the United States of America.

President of the United States, American President, POTUS, or The Presidents of the United States of America may also refer to:

== Politics ==
=== Current countries ===
- President of the United Mexican States, the chief executive of Mexico

=== Former countries ===
- President of the United States of Brazil
- President of the United States of Colombia
- Sukarno (1901–1970), President of the United States of Indonesia from 1949 to 1950
- President of the United States of Venezuela

== Other uses ==
- American President Lines, an American container shipping company
- P.O.T.U.S., a political talk channel on Sirius XM Radio
- POTUS: Or, Behind Every Great Dumbass Are Seven Women Trying to Keep Him Alive, a play by Selina Fillinger, 2022
- The Presidents of the United States of America (band), an American rock band
  - The Presidents of the United States of America (album), their debut studio album, 1995

== See also ==
- President of the United States in fiction
