= Lists of fictional presidents of the United States =

Lists of fictional presidents of the United States are alphabetical lists of people who have been portrayed as President of the United States in fiction. Media include novels and short stories, comics, plays, movies and television shows. The roles include fictional presidents, and real historical figures who did not in fact become president, typically in works of alternate history or comedy.

== Named fictional presidents ==
- List of fictional presidents of the United States (A–B)
- List of fictional presidents of the United States (C–D)
- List of fictional presidents of the United States (E–F)
- List of fictional presidents of the United States (G–H)
- List of fictional presidents of the United States (I–J)
- List of fictional presidents of the United States (K–M)
- List of fictional presidents of the United States (N–R)
- List of fictional presidents of the United States (S–T)
- List of fictional presidents of the United States (U–Z)

== Historical figures ==
- List of fictional United States presidencies of historical figures (A–B)
- List of fictional United States presidencies of historical figures (C–D)
- List of fictional United States presidencies of historical figures (E–G)
- List of fictional United States presidencies of historical figures (H–J)
- List of fictional United States presidencies of historical figures (K–L)
- List of fictional United States presidencies of historical figures (M–O)
- List of fictional United States presidencies of historical figures (P–R)
- List of fictional United States presidencies of historical figures (S–U)
- List of fictional United States presidencies of historical figures (V–Z)

== See also ==
- Alternate Presidents
- African-American presidents of the United States in popular culture
- Female president of the United States in popular culture
- List of actors who have played the president of the United States
- President of the United States in fiction
