= Edge of Tomorty: Rick Die Rickpeat =

- Rick and Morty episode
- Episode no.: Season 4 Episode 1
- Directed by: Erica Hayes
- Written by: Mike McMahan
- Production code: RAM-404
- Original air date: November 10, 2019
- Running time: 22 minutes

Guest appearance
- Sherri Shepherd as The Judge

Episode chronology
← Previous "The Rickchurian Mortydate"	Next → "The Old Man and the Seat"
- Rick and Morty season 4

"Edge of Tomorty: Rick Die Rickpeat" is the premiere episode of the fourth season of the Adult Swim animated television series Rick and Morty. Written by Mike McMahan and directed by Erica Hayes, loosely adapting Akira by Katsuhiro Otomo, the episode was broadcast on November 10, 2019. The episode received positive reviews from critics. A stand-alone graphic novel miniseries, Rick and Morty: Worlds Apart, serving as a sequel, was published by Oni Press from February 3 to May 5, 2021.

== Plot ==
Rick takes Morty on an adventure to Forbodulon Prime to harvest "death crystals", which allow a person to foresee their various possible deaths. When Morty holds a crystal, he envisions a peaceful death as an old man comforted by his longtime crush Jessica. Determined to make this future a reality, Morty follows the crystal's visions to guide him and assumes control of the ship on the way home. This leads to a crash that kills Rick. A holographic projection of Rick manifests and instructs Morty on how to bring him back to life using DNA from his corpse. Upon seeing through the crystal that reviving Rick will deviate his death from his desired outcome, Morty refuses and goes home alone.

While Holographic Rick harasses Morty to discard the crystal and restore him, Rick's consciousness is restored to clones from several different fascist realities, ending in a Wasp Rick, who helps him get home and transform back into a human. Morty, captivated by the guidance of the crystal, blindly obeys its prompts to steal weapons from Rick's arsenal and go on a killing spree. He allows himself to be captured, but escapes punishment by reciting the dying words of the trial judge's husband.

Rick, Wasp Rick, and Holographic Rick follow Morty, who uses a ferrofluid to turn himself into a monstrous cyborg. The Ricks extract Morty from the cyborg, but Holographic Rick is assimilated into the fluid and attempts to destroy the other Ricks and Morty. Wasp Rick stings the giant Holographic Rick in the eye, and the resulting mass of offspring bursts his head open.

Upon arriving home, Jerry and Beth chastise Rick for turning Morty into an "Akira", but Morty defends him and accepts responsibility for his actions. Rick and Morty agree to split the differences in their adventures in overlapping rants.

In a post-credits scene, Morty overhears Jessica envisioning her future career as a hospice care worker and realizes that he had misinterpreted the crystal's visions. When Rick portals in and asks him for help on another adventure, a furious Morty immediately agrees.

== Production and writing ==
"Edge of Tomorty" was written by executive producer Mike McMahan and directed by Erica Hayes. The episode is dedicated to producer Mike Mendel, who died on September 22, 2019. Characters introduced in this episode include Teddy Rick, Nazi Morty, Shrimp Rick, Wasp Rick, and a Kirkland version of Mr. Meeseeks. Returning characters include Gearhead, Jessica, Mr. Meeseeks, and the President. Themes used that had been previously presented in the series include the use of Meeseeks boxes from the episode "Meeseeks and Destroy"; the shift in the Smith family hierarchy from third season episode "The Rickchurian Mortydate"; and "Operation Phoenix" from the second season episode "Big Trouble in Little Sanchez". The ferro fluid sequence was animated by Studio Yotta, who previously animated on the "Bushworld Adventures" episode.

=== Themes and cultural references ===
Several pop culture references and homages are presented throughout the episode. Its title is derived from the science fiction film Edge of Tomorrow and its tagline "Live Die Repeat", in which the protagonist dies and is repeatedly resurrected due to alien technology. Zack Handlen of The A.V. Club observed that the themes of death in the episode are presented in two ideas: one which gives Rick endless lives (through a device that keeps waking up a clone in another reality; every time that clone dies, a new one wakes up someplace else) and Morty "the ability to predict the future and avoid death without exactly knowing what any of it means." It also drew inspiration from Japanese anime, as Edge of Tomorrow itself was based on the Japanese light novel All You Need is Kill. Critics also noted the episode's partial adaptation of the manga Akira. In an argument with Rick, Jerry warns that "I don't want to see anymore Anime stuff happening to my son, buster!" Several commentators noticed the Morty's fixation on avoiding a violent death leads to the violent deaths of many, which was similar to going to a full "Akira"/Tetsuo from the manga and anime. Morty himself was described by the police and news as an "Akira boy".

== Reception ==
=== Broadcast and ratings ===
The season premiere was broadcast by Adult Swim on November 10, 2019. The episode was also streamed online for free for audiences based in the United States. According to Nielsen Media Research, "Edge of Tomorty" was seen by 2.33 million household viewers in the United States and received a 1.9 rating among the 18–49 adult demographic, an increase from the 676,000 viewers during the initial broadcast of the previous season's premiere episode.

=== Critical response ===
The A.V. Club's Zack Handlen gave the episode an "A−" rating, and praise it as "about as close to a straight putt as the series is capable of: Rick and Morty go on an adventure, a concept is introduced, and there are then horrible consequences which keep escalating until the status quo is restored." Jack Shepherd of GamesRadar+ gave it a four-star rating, describing it as "certainly a bold opening to the season" and lauding its closing monologue for a mission statement for the season as similar to that of the second season's premiere. Jesse Schedeen of IGN also praised it as the show's strongest to date, extolling the heavy emphasis on Morty himself, saying that it "helps the new season begin on a compelling and, at times, even heartwarming note". Vulture's Liz Shannon Miller described the episode as a "bleak beginning to the season" and commented that there is the brutal reality that fascism has become "the default" for most of the multiverse.
