= Anna Hastings =

1977 novel by Allen Drury

- US first edition
- Author: Allen Drury
- Language: English
- Series: Mark Coffin, U.S.S.
- Genre: Political novel
- Publisher: William Morrow
- Publication date: July 1977
- Publication place: United States
- Media type: Print (Hardcover & Paperback)
- Pages: 300
- ISBN: 0-688-03221-4
- Followed by: Mark Coffin, U.S.S.

Anna Hastings: The Story of a Washington Newspaperperson is a 1977 political novel by Allen Drury which follows the titular reporter as she climbs her way to the top of the Washington media elite. It is set in a different fictional timeline from Drury's 1959 novel Advise and Consent, which earned him a Pulitzer Prize for Fiction.

== Plot summary ==
Anna Kowalczek arrives in Washington, D.C., on the day the United States enters World War II. Working in the male-dominated fields of politics and journalism, she presents herself as cheerful and light-hearted, conforming to contemporary expectations of young women while concealing her intelligence and ambition. Thirty-five years later, as Anna Hastings, the widow of Texas Senator Gordon Hastings, she is a newspaper columnist and television personality, the publisher of a major newspaper, and the head of a media company.

== Reception ==
In 2009, The Wall Street Journal published a retrospective by National Public Radio commentator Scott Simon in which he called Anna Hastings "both an unsparing and sympathetic portrait of a newspaperwoman when they were rare and often maligned." John Barkham wrote in The Victoria Advocate in 1977:

What Drury's Washington novels badly needed was a blue pencil, a less blatant ideology, and greater attention to characterization. In Anna Hastings he delivers all three. This is his most convincing Washington novel since Advise and Consent in 1959. Moreover, he has freed himself of the incubus of his crippling cast of carry-ver fossilized pols from earlier books. Anna Hastings is both a fresh face and a fresh start in Drury fiction.

Inevitably there were some observers who assumed similarities between Anna Hastings and Katharine Graham, publisher of The Washington Post. This supposition resurfaces occasionally, as when Roger Kaplan, writing for the Policy Review in 1999, called Anna Hastings a "transparent attack," adding:

Though [Drury] never lost his talent for spinning a good yarn, drawing amusing, likable, admirable, and detestable characters in great quantity ... His demolition of The Washington Post and the vices he considered to have seeped into the craft of political journalism in America [in] Anna Hastings is incomprehensible to anyone not familiar with the evolution of the American media, and particularly the Washington media, in the past generation.

However, there is no evidence Graham herself saw any such similarities or perceived the novel as critical of herself or her newspaper. Like most reviewers at the time, Barkham noted that "Washington is in fact graced by an influential woman newspaper publisher, but she is quite unlike Anna. Drury in fact makes a point of introducing her and her paper into his narrative." The two publishers, real and fictional, would again be referenced in Drury's 1983 novel Decision.

Though Allen Drury portrayed equal rights for all Americans, including women, as an essential political goal in all of his novels, he was of a generation that came of age in the 1930s and his language can sound condescending to modern sensibilities. John Maxwell Hamilton reflected this perception when he called Anna Hastings "mean spirited about what was then budding feminism" in his 2000 book Casanova Was a Book Lover. He quoted Allen Drury's dedication of Anna Hastings as illustrative of his point:

Dedicated to all those vigorous, determined, indomitable, and sometimes a wee bit ruthless Bettys, Barbaras, Helens, Nancys, Kays, Marys, Lizes, Deenas, Dorises, Mays, Sarahs, Evelyns, Mariannes, Clares, Frans, Naomis, Miriams, Maxines, Bonnies and the rest, who never cease to amuse, annoy and quite often out scoop their male colleagues of the Washington press corps. They've made it in a tough league—at a certain cost, of course; but they've made it.

== Series ==
Anna Hastings takes place in a separate timeline from the Advise and Consent series, and was followed in 1979 by Mark Coffin, U.S.S., Drury's next modern political novel. Though Hastings does not appear in this novel, she is a minor character in The Hill of Summer (1981) and The Roads of Earth (1984), the two sequels to Mark Coffin, U.S.S..
