= The Man (1972 film) =

1972 American political drama film

- Directed by: Joseph Sargent
- Screenplay by: Rod Serling
- Story by: Rod Serling
- Based on: The Man by Irving Wallace
- Produced by: Lee Rich
- Starring: James Earl Jones; Martin Balsam; Burgess Meredith; Lew Ayres; William Windom; Barbara Rush
- Cinematography: Edward Rosson
- Edited by: George Jay Nicholson
- Music by: Jerry Goldsmith
- Production companies: ABC Circle Films; Lorimar
- Distributed by: Paramount Pictures
- Release date: July 19, 1972
- Running time: 93 minutes
- Country: United States
- Language: English

The Man is a 1972 American political drama film directed by Joseph Sargent and starring James Earl Jones. Jones plays Douglass Dilman, the President pro tempore of the United States Senate, who succeeds to the presidency through a series of unforeseeable events, thereby becoming both the first African-American president and the first wholly unelected one. The screenplay, written by Rod Serling, is largely based upon The Man, a novel by Irving Wallace. In addition to being the first black president more than thirty-six years before the real-world occurrence, the fictional Dilman was also the first president elected to neither that office nor to the Vice Presidency, foreshadowing the real-world elevation of Gerald Ford by less than twenty-five months.

== Plot ==
When the President of the United States and speaker of the House of Representatives are killed at a summit in Frankfurt when the building hosting them collapses, Vice President Noah Calvin, suffering from a terminal illness, refuses to assume of the office of president. Secretary of State Arthur Eaton corrects a popular misconception that he is next in the line of succession, who is actually Senate president pro tem Douglass Dilman. Dilman, a black man, arrives at the White House and is sworn in as president. Eaton's wife Kay berates her husband for not trying to become president, but Eaton assures her that he will assume the presidency once Dilman proves unable to handle the job.

Eaton and his advisers arrive at the Oval Office for a meeting with Dilman, giving him a binder which includes pre-written responses to media questions which support the previous president's policies. Dilman proceeds to the briefing room, and answers the media using Eaton's responses. However, when a reporter accuses Dilman of being a puppet, he discards Eaton's binder and proceeds on his own initiative, deciding to make his own decisions. As a moderate, Dilman is confronted by extremists from both ends of the political spectrum due to his race. Robert Wheeler, a young black man, is sought for extradition from the South African government for allegedly attempting to assassinate the country's Minister of Defence. Dilman offers to help Wheeler after he claims that he was in Burundi at the time of the assassination attempt.

A senator named Watson introduces a bill which would require congressional approval for any dismissal of a cabinet member by the president. Though Eaton does not inform Dilman of the bill, he is informed of it by a group of black congressmen who meet with the president to voice their concerns. Dilman subsequently reprimands Eaton for not bringing the bill to his attention. Watson visits the embassy of South Africa in Washington, D.C., where the South African ambassador shows him a recording proving that Wheeler was in South Africa during the assassination attempt. After the recording is made public, the ensuing scandal threatens Dilman's presidency. Dilman subsequently obtains Wheeler's confession and approves his extradition, which alienates his daughter Wanda. When Wheeler calls Dilman a "house nigger", he responds by stating that "black men don't burn churches and kill four children; they don't hunt down a Martin Luther King with a telescopic sight. Passion may drive you to the streets to throw a brick, but to buy a gun, plant an alibi and travel 5000 miles and kill a human being is bloodless, worthy of the selective morality of Adolf Eichmann."

Dilman addresses reporters at his party's presidential nominating convention, where Eaton is by now openly challenging him for the presidential nomination with Watson's support. The president explains that while some people view political violence as the only solution to present issues, he will continue to rely on peaceful means. Evading questions over the Wheeler scandal, Dilman assures the reporters that he is going to "fight like hell" against Eaton to win the nomination. To the tune of "Hail to the Chief", he is introduced to the convention delegates.

== Cast ==
- James Earl Jones as President Douglass Dilman
- Martin Balsam as Jim Talley
- Burgess Meredith as Senator Watson
- Lew Ayres as Vice President Noah Calvin
- William Windom as Secretary of State Arthur Eaton
- Barbara Rush as Kay Eaton
- Georg Stanford Brown as Robert Wheeler
- Janet MacLachlan as Wanda
- Patric Knowles as South African Consul
- Martin E. Brooks as Wheeler's Lawyer
- Simon Scott as Hugh Gaynor

== Release ==
The Man was released in theatres on July 19, 1972.

== Reception ==
Film critic Vincent Canby of The New York Times wrote in his review:

If The Man were a better movie, it might possibly be offensive. It isn't. It's silly and innocent, and when the band strikes up 'Hail to the Chief', it invites an idiotic tear. Rod Serling, who wrote the story and screenplay, has reworked and recut the original novel as if he were a tailor remodeling an old-fashioned suit to conform with current fashions, and Joseph Sargent, whose direction of The Forbin Project I admired, has made sure that it's all in focus.

In an interview with Greg Braxton of the Los Angeles Times that ran January 16, 2009, four days before Barack Obama was inaugurated as president, James Earl Jones was asked about having portrayed the fictional first black U.S. president on film. He replied: "I have misgivings about that one. It was done as a TV special. Had we known it was to be released as a motion picture, we would have asked for more time and more production money. I regret that."

== See also ==
- List of American films of 1972
