= Mark Coffin, U.S.S. =

1979 novel by Allen Drury

- US first edition
- Author: Allen Drury
- Language: English
- Series: Mark Coffin, U.S.S.
- Genre: Political novel
- Published: 1979 (Doubleday)
- Publication place: United States
- Media type: Print (Hardcover & Paperback)
- Pages: 343
- ISBN: 0-385-14434-2
- Preceded by: Anna Hastings
- Followed by: The Hill of Summer; The Roads of Earth

Mark Coffin U.S.S. is a 1979 political novel by Allen Drury which follows the titular young U.S. Senator as he navigates Washington politics. It is set in a different fictional timeline from Drury's 1959 novel Advise and Consent, which earned him a Pulitzer Prize for Fiction.

The novel was out of print for several years until WordFire Press reissued it in paperback and e-book formats in 2014.

== Plot summary ==
Young, idealistic Mark Coffin wins a surprise, upset election victory, turning the 30-year-old Stanford University professor into the junior senator from California. Additionally, in the concurrent presidential election, his party's presidential candidate rides Mark's coattails to corral California's electoral votes and the White House. Mark has studied politics as a professor but has never run for office. However, his father-in-law is Jim Elrod, a powerful senior senator from North Carolina and chairman of the Armed Services committee, and Mark's father owns one of the largest newspapers in the state. Indeed, his own wife, who had wanted Mark to run, is fearful because of the election results: the new President will want to show that he owes nothing to Mark by making his life difficult. Mark goes to Washington amid the glare of the media spotlight, and reporters Bill Adams, Chuck Dangerfield and Lisette Greyson take an interest in his career from the start, praising him as one of the most idealistic and promising senators to hit town in decades. Other Senate wives warn Mark's wife that Lisette has tried to seduce several married Senators.

Mark's hopes of sitting on the Senate Foreign Relations Committee are damaged when he takes strong positions on two hot button issues: his father-in-law's bill to add ten billion dollars to the defense appropriation, to be used to try to catch up with the Soviets; and the Attorney General nomination of Charlie Macklin, the tough D.A. of Los Angeles County, whom Mark considers a demagogue that runs roughshod over civil liberties. He also makes an enemy of the governor of California, who had pushed Coffin's candidacy, as the governor had also suggested Macklin to the new President. Older senators who agree with him warn him to tread lightly, but Mark feels that he must make a stand on the issues he promised his supporters to fight for. Mark leads other junior senators in bucking the Washington establishment on these two issues. These so-called "Young Turks" include Rick Duclos of Vermont, who has an eye for the ladies and a teenage son, and Bob Templeton of Colorado, who recently lost his family in a plane accident. When Mark will not soften his opposition, he loses the committee assignment to Duclos.

During the celebrations of the President's inauguration, a mere 17 days after Mark himself took office, he gets extremely drunk because of the bitterness he feels at the setback. He goes to Lisette's apartment, and later returns home. At first it seems that no one knows, but then it slowly leaks out. A furor ensues, with Lisette apparently milking the story for her own advantage. His wife is devastated. Mark thinks he has already failed in his mission and considers resigning. However, his wife, her father, and her father's girlfriend, who is also a powerful Senator, are all political animals, and unite to get him through the problems he has caused. Macklin uses the story in his own confirmation hearings to try and discredit Mark, but ends up insulting a number of Senators. His nomination is narrowly defeated. On the defense appropriations fight, his own father-in-law effectively beats back his opposition. Mark has now won one fight and lost another, and he goes on to an effective career, but his failure at the beginning is brought up at critical moments for the rest of his life.

== Series ==
Later Drury books in the same timeline are The Hill of Summer (1981) and The Roads of Earth (1984), a two-part series dealing with a major crisis between the United States and the Soviet Union. Drury's 1977 novel Anna Hastings is also set in the same timeline, with its title character Anna appearing in a supporting role in The Hill of Summer and The Roads of Earth.
