= President of the United States in fiction =

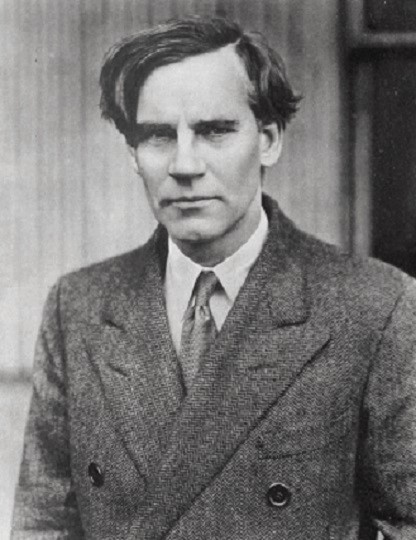
Walter Huston played the lead in Abraham Lincoln (1930) and the fictitious president Judson Hammond in Gabriel Over the White House (1933).

People have frequently been portrayed in fiction as the president of the United States. Media include novels and short stories, comics, plays, films, and television shows. The roles include fictional presidents, fictionalized accounts of actual presidents, and real historical figures who did not in fact become president, typically in works of alternate history or comedy.

A substantial number of fictional works explore the possibility of an individual from an historically politically under-represented group, such as women or African-Americans, becoming president. Some works also center on machinations by a vice-president seeking to become president.

A 2020 analysis identified 148 fictional U.S. presidents in film.

== History ==
From the founding of the United States up to the 1930s, works of fiction depicting or parodying actual presidents were commonly produced, but depictions of entirely fictional presidents were much less common.

The 1931 musical, Of Thee I Sing, with a score by George Gershwin, lyrics by Ira Gershwin and a book by George S. Kaufman and Morrie Ryskind, comically depicts the fictional John P. Wintergreen as being elected president on a campaign of love. The first American musical with a consistently satirical tone, Congress, the U.S. Supreme Court, the Presidency, and the democratic process itself were all targets of this satire, prompting original stars William Gaxton and Victor Moore to wonder if they would face government repercussions for their portrayals of President Wintergreen and Vice President Throttlebottom. Specific political parties are not identified in the musical, as Kaufman and Ryskind believed that absurdity was bipartisan in Depression-era politics.

While the 1932 film, The Phantom President, depicts a fictional presidential candidate, the earliest film depiction of a fictional president in office is in the 1933 film, Gabriel Over the White House.

== Cultural influence ==
The idea of a female president of the United States has been explored by various writers in novels (including science fiction), movies and television, as well as other media. Numerous actresses have portrayed a female president of the United States. Such portrayals have occurred in comedies as well as serious works. Fictional female acting presidents of the United States are not included in this article. In the 2020 presidential election, Kamala Harris became the first woman to be elected as Vice President of the United States and was inaugurated on January 20, 2021, becoming the first female vice president in American history. On November 19, 2021, President Joseph R. Biden underwent a colonoscopy, and temporarily transferred the powers of the presidency to then Vice President Kamala Harris as acting president, becoming the first woman to exercise presidential power.

Before and after the election of Barack Obama as the first African American president of the United States in 2008, the idea of a black president of the United States has been explored by various writers in novels (including science fiction), movies and television, as well as other media. Numerous actors have portrayed a black president. Such portrayals have occurred in both serious works and comedies.

As writers and directors cast blacks as president in several memorable portrayals, depictions of fictional black presidents may have accustomed Americans to accept a black man as president. Actor Dennis Haysbert who played a black president on the hit show 24, said the portrayal “may have opened the eyes, the minds and the hearts of people because the character was so well liked." The show also raised the issue of whether television series "like political trial ballons, can ready the populace for change."

== Vice Presidents ==
The office of Vice President of the United States is technically the second highest office in the American federal government, and an office from which occupants may succeed to the presidency through various potentially dramatic means. Occupants of this office have also often been depicted in fiction, and it has been noted that fictional vice presidents are often depicted as immoral, corrupt, or outright villainous characters. Beginning in the 2000s, with female candidates becoming more successful in national politics, these depictions have frequently depicted female vice presidents in a particularly negative light. For example, in the 2011 novel, It's Classified, by former Sarah Palin advisor Nicolle Wallace, fictional female vice president Tara Meyers is depicted as mentally ill.

Vice presidents are often depicted as having ambitions to become president, sometimes scheming to cause the removal of the president in order to ascend to that office, and sometimes becoming president, either through such machinations, or through unforeseen circumstances. In the musical Of Thee I Sing, Vice President Throttlebottom is briefly excited at the prospect of becoming President when party members conspire to impeach and remove President Wintergreen.

== See also ==
- Alternate Presidents
- African-American presidents of the United States in popular culture
- Female president of the United States in popular culture
- List of actors who have played the president of the United States
- Lists of fictional presidents of the United States

== Bibliography ==
- Peter C. Rollins and John E. O'Connor, eds., Hollywood's White House: The American Presidency in Film and History (2010).
- Jeff Smith, The Presidents We Imagine: Two Centuries of White House Fictions on the Page, on the Stage, Onscreen, and Online (Univ. Wisc. Press, 2009).
