= The Rickchurian Mortydate =

- Rick and Morty episode
- Episode no.: Season 3 Episode 10
- Directed by: Anthony Chun
- Written by: Dan Harmon
- Original air date: October 1, 2017
- Running time: 22 minutes

Guest appearances
- Keith David as The President; Tara Strong as The Presidentress of the Mega-Gargantuan

Episode chronology
← Previous "The ABC's of Beth"	Next → "Edge of Tomorty: Rick Die Rickpeat"
- Rick and Morty (season 3)

"The Rickchurian Mortydate" is the tenth and final episode of the third season of the American science fiction television series Rick and Morty. It follows the titular grandson and grandfather duo as they feud with the President of the United States. The episode, directed by Anthony Chun and written by series co-creator Dan Harmon, aired on Adult Swim on October 1, 2017.

== Plot ==
The President calls on Rick and Morty to defeat a monster in the "Kennedy sex tunnels" underneath the White House, which they do with little effort. Annoyed that the President constantly calls on them without any gratitude "like Ghostbusters", they go back home to play Minecraft, with the President quickly finding out. After calling the pair and calling out their neglect of duty, the resulting argument leads to a battle of egos. Rick reiterates they operate above the authority of the U.S. government, and the President declares they will not accept the two's services to save the world. However, they continue one-upping the President by negotiating a peace deal with a microscopic culture in the Amazon rainforest and a treaty ending the Israeli-Palestinian conflict. It culminates in a fight in the White House between Rick and the President's security to force him to pose for a selfie with Morty, despite Morty saying he does not want one.

Meanwhile, Beth begins to fear she might be a clone made by Rick after the events of "The ABCs of Beth." When she asks Rick he denies it but also does not say if he would tell her if she was and mentions that if she was a clone who discovered her identity he would have to kill her, causing her to panic. Beth reunites with Jerry to figure out the truth, and they decide to get back together. Shortly after, the entire family gets together to hide from Rick because of his conflict with the President, but he tracks them down. Rick eventually reassures Beth that he will not kill her and submits to Jerry once again being a family member.

Rick ends his conflict with the President by pretending to be Fly Fishing Rick, a Rick from a different reality, and calling a truce. The episode ends with the family happy to be together again, although Rick is disappointed about losing his dominant position. In a post-credits scene, Mr. Poopybutthole returns to apologize for not appearing in Season 3, but he has gotten married and has a son. He ends the scene by saying that it will be a long wait until season four.

== Production ==
On September 20, 2017, the episode title was revealed to be "The Rickchurian Mortydate" by The Futon Critic. The writing and directorial credits of Dan Harmon and Anthony Chun, respectively, were announced upon the episode's airing. The title is a reference to The Manchurian Candidate, a 1962 political thriller film.

The episode stars Justin Roiland as Rick Sanchez and Morty Smith, Chris Parnell as Jerry Smith, Sarah Chalke as Beth Smith, and Spencer Grammer as Summer Smith. Also in the episode, Roiland voices series recurring characters Mr. Poopybutthole, actor Keith David voices the President of the United States, a major character in the episode, and Tara Strong portrays the Presidentress of the Mega Gargantuans, an alien species.

== Reception ==
=== Viewing figures ===
The episode was viewed by 2.60 million American viewers upon its airdate.

=== Critical reception ===
Joe Matar of Den of Geek said the season finale "didn’t make for a terribly funny episode" and that it "got a bit preoccupied in expositing itself. This was mostly a very, very solid season, but this finale was a mad scramble to tidy up Beth and Jerry’s divorce while Rick horsed around with the President."

Jesse Schedeen of IGN both criticized and praised the episode, saying "The Rickchurian Mortydate" "isn't the most dramatic or emotionally devastating episode ever, but it's still a fun, memorable way to wrap up the show's most eclectic season to date. Rick's violent rivalry with the president entertained from start to finish, while Beth's clone crisis gave the episode the dramatic edge it needed. Best of all, this episode gave Rick just the sort of comeuppance he needed after his sinister behavior in Season 3."
