= President Curtis (TV series) =

American animated science-fiction comedy franchise

- Genre: Adult animation; Animated sitcom; Adventure; Black comedy; Satire; Science fiction
- Created by: James Siciliano; Dan Harmon
- Based on: President Andre Curtis by Wes Archer and Tom Kauffman
- Voices of: Keith David; Stephanie Beatriz; Jim Rash
- Composer: Ryan Elder
- Country of origin: United States
- Original language: English
- No. of seasons: 1
- No. of episodes: 10

Production
- Executive producers: Dan Harmon; James Siciliano; Danielle Uhlarik; Steve Levy; Monica Mitchell
- Producer: Anthony Alfonso
- Running time: 24 minutes
- Production companies: Pug Party; Harmonious Claptrap; Williams Street

Original release
- Network: Adult Swim
- Release: July 26, 2026 – present

Related
- Rick and Morty franchise

President Curtis is an American adult animated science-fiction comedy television series created by James Siciliano and Dan Harmon for Adult Swim. A spin-off of Rick and Morty, based on the character of the same name by Wes Archer and Tom Kauffman, the series follows Andre Curtis, the president of the United States, and his staff as they respond to interdimensional, paranormal and other unexplained crises. Keith David reprises his role as Curtis, with Stephanie Beatriz and Jim Rash also starring. Adult Swim announced the series at San Diego Comic-Con in July 2025, following a surprise appearance by David during the Rick and Morty panel.

The series premiered on July 26, 2026, with new episodes every Sunday. Episodes became available on HBO Max the following day. In July 2026 ahead of the series premiere, the series was renewed for a second season.

== Premise ==
The series follows President Andre Curtis and his staff as they handle crises that his nemesis generally avoids, including inter-dimensional diplomacy, paranormal investigations, and unexplained phenomena.

With the exception of the pilot episode and "Timber", the end credits show President Curtis in the shower singing about the episode's content to the tune of this show's theme song. Like Rick and Morty, each episode after the pilot has a post-credits scene.

== Voice cast ==
=== Main ===
- Keith David as President Andre Curtis, the President of the United States and former Marine who served in Afghanistan.
- Stephanie Beatriz as Roe Banks, Curtis' White House Chief of Staff and a cyborg.
- Jim Rash as Special Agent Francis O'Doyle, a by the book half-leprechaun U.S. Secret Service agent.

=== Recurring characters ===
- Alanna Ubach as Janice, Curtis' calm and hyper-efficient secretary.
- David Cross as Dr. Kenny Finch, a government scientist and inventor.
- Dan Bakkedahl as Special Agent Alan Chomps, a U.S. Secret Service agent who is transformed into a werewolf.

=== Returning characters ===
- Harry Belden as Morty Smith
- Ian Cardoni as Rick Sanchez

== Episodes ==
No.	Title	Directed by	Written by	Original release date
1	"Pilot"	Fill Marc Sagadraca	Dan Harmon & James Siciliano	July 26, 2026
Cyborg Roe Banks begins her first day as White House Chief of Staff under President Andre Curtis by attending Curtis' briefing on the death of Paul Bunyan to the White House press corps and identifying a doppelgobbler. Later, CIA agent Jack Coffey attempts to steal footage of the Moon landing and then tries blackmailing Curtis for it. Banks and Secret Service special agent Francis O'Doyle retrieve Coffey, who admits the government left Adam, a specially-bred baby on the moon during the landing. Using a space ship built by Rick Sanchez, Curtis, Banks, and O'Doyle travel to the Moon and encounter Adam, who is the son of John F. Kennedy and believes he is destined to become president. After a fierce fight, they apprehend Adam and Curtis publicly reveals the blackmail the CIA has on him in the form of footage of him defecating himself in the White House Gym. While Coffey's superior marks his mission file a failure and makes him spin the CIA Wheel of Punishment, Banks moves into her new office, O'Doyle crafts EMP bullets, and Curtis sleeps in his bed alone.
2	"Triangle"	Bryan Newton	Anne Lane	August 2, 2026
When the corpse of the Loch Ness Monster washes up on a beach wearing a prison jumpsuit, Curtis reveals to Banks the existence of the Triangle, a secret maximum security prison for the paranormal at the heart of the Bermuda Triangle. Suspecting corruption amongst the prison staff, Curtis provokes O'Doyle into assaulting him so he could go undercover as an inmate while Banks and himself simultaneously perform a surprise inspection. Then Curtis and Banks fly to the Bermuda Triangle with help from Amelia Earhart. While Curtis gets distracted by the prison warden Ken Jeffries after learning he is a fellow Marine, O'Doyle befriends fellow inmate Swamptopus. It turns out that Jeffries was trying to imitate Monsters, Inc. by collecting screams from the inmates. Banks causes a prison riot to free Curtis, O'Doyle and Swamptopus while the lead Triangle guard is killed when Count Dracula flies into his body in bat form. Curtis, Banks, and O'Doyle confront Jeffries, who admits to have been dishonorably discharged. He and Curtis briefly fight, before the former is fatally impaled by his own trophy as Jeffries had foreseen. Curtis assigns Earhart as the new prison warden. Post-credits scene: Swamptopus warns a new demon arrival to the Triangle of Dracula. At Swamptopus' insistence, the prisoner simply keeps his mouth closed, preventing Dracula from entering his body.
3	"Ex"	Juan Meza-León	James Siciliano	August 9, 2026
Curtis attends the inauguration gala for his ex-wife Beverly Mills, who is now the Governor of Illinois and is actively working to rehabilitate the paranormal like she did to Candyman. Curtis and special agent Alan Chomps come across a plot by the Chicago Werewolves Syndicate to hold the gala hostage and work with Mills to thwart it at the cost of Chomps becoming a werewolf. Meanwhile, O'Doyle and Banks are forced to undergo a job evaluation at West Wing World due to their respective violations by the Head of Homeland Security. Unfortunately, Banks accidentally alerts the robots to their true nature, causing them to turn on all humans, forcing the two of them to fight to escape. With help from Candyman and Chomps, Curtis manages to defeat the Werewolf Syndicate, who are then arrested. Post-credits scene: Chomps is kept in a special cell while being prepared to become Curtis' first paranormal agent as he and Dr. Finch provide him with a special collar to control his transformations.
4	"Purchase"	Erik Kling	Brian Prodi Flynn	August 16, 2026
While searching the White House attic for George Washington's wooden throwing stars, Banks finds a purchase receipt from Napoleon Bonaparte to Thomas Jefferson for the territory of Louisiana, with the fine print warning not to enter a specific cave in Rocky Mountain. Banks ignores Curtis' advice not to investigate, resulting in the three of them triggering a trap that legally violates Jefferson's agreement with Napoleon and allow him to reclaim Louisiana, as well as alerting a Bonapartist secret society led by Commandant Dulac. Meanwhile, Dr. Finch helps Alan Chomps control his werewolf form. After a call from the head of France's Head of Real Estate Acquisitions Department named Marc Luc de Bergeron, Banks tells Curtis that if the French acquire Napoleon's preserved genitalia and certify it as a citizen in American court, they can reclaim the land. The team travel to New Orleans and meet Salem Montgomery, leader of a vampire coven that had served all the presidents, to find the artifact, but Salem betrays them to the French due to the fact that Jefferson has "Mark Zuckerberg-ed them". With the aid of rebel vampire named Elsie, Curtis and his team kill Salem and thwart Dulac's plot. As the remaining vampire leave alongside Elsie when the Sun comes up as O'Doyle welcomes her to Washington DC, Curtis exiles Dulac and her followers from America as he calls Bergeron. At the White House, O'Doyle shares the hot wings with Curtis, Banks, Chomps, and Janice as they all agree how bad they taste. Post-credits scene: Earlier in the episode, Curtis texts Salem to fake a confrontation between them to fool Banks and O'Doyle.
5	"David"	Mollie Helms	Malloy Moseley	August 23, 2026
Curtis is suffering from disagreements with The Party's leadership over his vigilante activities and overhears them planning to drop their re-election support, leaving Banks and O'Doyle nervous about their own standing. Curtis then travels to Camp David to uphold Franklin D. Roosevelt's pact with David the Water Witch, where he has to spend a night in her swamp in a loincloth and endure her illusions. Meanwhile, Banks and O'Doyle wait for him at Camp David, where Banks bonds with the White House Lifers Janice, Max in Accounting, Chef Matteo, Chief Usher Cherri, and Sandra in Catering. Unfortunately, Curtis unintentionally gives into David's deception when she throws him into an illusion of his old dishwasher job overseen by Chet Simmons, allowing her to break free of her imprisonment and go on a murderous rampage killing secret service agents Kyle and Lisa, Chef Matteo, Sandra, and Trent McGaffin. Curtis and his surviving staff manage to reimprison her while confessing their insecurities as part of the ritual. Upon their return to the White House, Curtis calls The Party and tells them he doesn't care about their lack of support as both sides forget to hang up. Post-credits scene: O'Doyle attends the funeral of Trent McGaffin whom he considered equally attractive to himself. After paying his respects, O'Doyle is upset to hear from Trent's father that Trent considered him annoying.
6	"Hollow"	Juan Meza-León	Danielle Uhlarik	August 30, 2026
When America is in an energy crisis as noted by Dr. Keel, Curtis and his team visit Hollow Earth and O'Doyle is tasked with protecting Janice who is familiar with the Hollow Earth landscape and the Daaboo tribe. When they discover the first layer was getting their power from the layer below where the Moss People live, they go deeper towards the Mushroom People and deeper towards the Nickel People until they reach a layer with an abandoned spaceship filled with a species of power-generating bear-like aliens that evolve via mitosis, who Banks nicknames the "Gobobears". An alien species called the Archians attempt to harvest them. After they are stopped following the sacrifice of the Gobobear Two-Toes, Curtis releases the Gobobears. After they are released, Dr. Keel rants to Curtis that they now owe generators to the Hollow Earth tribes. To rectify this much to the dismay of Dr. Keel, Curtis implements a tax on generative AI pornography during his next press conference. Post-credits scene: An Us Weekly magazine calls Curtis "President Bummer" in light of the AI porn tax. Curtis quotes "God damn it".
7	"Ghosts"	Erik Kling	Haley Daniels	September 6, 2026
While celebrating the birthday of Abraham Lincoln's ghost, who is trapped in the Lincoln Bedroom, Banks discovers her system is infected with malware. Knowing reporting this to the Bureau of Robotics would get her fired, she hides in a Faraday cage and has O'Doyle virtually go into her system. While he neutralizes the malware, he discovers repressed memories from her past. Meanwhile, Curtis gifts Lincoln special Ghost Gloves designed by Dr. Finch to allow him to physically interact with objects and tries helping him resolve his unfinished business, including cloning John Wilkes Booth for him to kill. However, Lincoln attempts to reclaim his presidential power as his unfinished business by restarting the American Civil War, forcing Curtis to shoot him with ghost bullets before confining him back to the Lincoln Bedroom with a special anti-ghost forcefield made by Dr. Finch. In truth, Banks used to work for a startup company called NuMind and designed a brain-computer interface chip. When the FBI raided the company for violating government regulations, Banks accidentally impaled her head, and the company CEO Logan Parks used the last chip on her, took credit for her work and wiped her memories. This discovery triggers a failsafe Parks installed to trap Banks in her subconscious, though she manages to fight back and regain control of her body. Though Banks considers wiping her own memories, O'Doyle convinces her to live with her past. Post-credits scene: Lying on the bed in the Lincoln Bedroom, Lincoln laments not using the Ghost Gloves to masturbate.
8	"Knox"	Juan Meza-León	Anne Lane	September 13, 2026
All the gold bullion in Fort Knox was mysteriously stolen and the FBI had detained O'Doyle's mother, Orla O'Doyle, who proclaimed she would only confess before her son. When O'Doyle begrudgingly faces her, she implicates him in her crime and forces him on the run. Banks tracks O'Doyle to his safehouse and offers to help him clear his name as well as utilizing a leprechaun mind meld called the Rainbow Connection to help him lie. O'Doyle interrogates members of the rival Cahill clan and learn that his mother had killed the matriarchs of the other clans and united them and their powers to teleport the gold to his townhouse to force him to rejoin her. When Curtis rejoins O'Doyle and Banks, they come up with a plan to sneak the gold back into Fort Knox, with Dr. Finch helping shrink down the gold and provide pills so they could impersonate the guards. Banks later disguises herself as O'Doyle and tricks Orla into confessing her crimes, resulting in her being sent to the Triangle. Upon arrival, Orla purposely gets herself sent to solitary by killing an orc inmate. She makes contact with Darla the Soul Ganderer from "Triangle" who survived the biplane incident and plans to make use of her. Post-credits scene: Larry, one of the Fort Knox guards, who was earlier tricked by O'Doyle into thinking he was his co-worker girlfriend Shelley, runs away thinking that O'Doyle has returned when the real Shelley starts teasing him with his foot fetish. Shelley tells herself not to have anyone see her crying.
9	"Synths"	Eric Meister & Mollie Helms	James Siciliano & Danielle Uhlarik	September 20, 2026
After defeating the Humbugler from wrecking a shopping mall, Curtis, Banks, and O'Doyle learn from Dr. Finch that Christmas spirit is at an all time low. Finch persuades Curtis to allow use of his synthetic super soldiers to help spread Christmas cheer and they strike a deal with Hallmark CEO Ed Carol whom Banks observes resembles Santa Claus, for use of his company's proprietary algorithm to help program them in exchange for the synths terminating at midnight on Christmas Eve. While the synths successfully restore Christmas spirit, Curtis has second thoughts about discarding them and fakes their deaths. But while transporting them, the team is pursued by Ed, revealed to Santa Claus, who feels the synths are a threat to his control of Christmas. Banks is able to force Santa to retreat by injecting a dick bomb in his neck, but not before he gets her curious about her past life. The synths are then released outside Montreal, Canada. Post-credits scene: Co-anchoring stepsisters Mika and Carolyn Gladyssmer discuss whether to braid the former's hair off the air.
10	"Timber"	Erik Kling	James Siciliano & Cara McFarlane	September 27, 2026
Due to a miscommunication within the FBI, the government fails to retrieve Paul Bunyan's severed head after he is killed by Curtis. Over the months, tree roots grow around Bunyan, restoring him to life in a wooden body. Upset at the positive attention Bunyan is receiving while dealing with backlash from the news media, Curtis attempts to arrest him again, despite protests from Banks to come up with a plan first. Curtis' team finds Bunyan, and Curtis tries to confront him, but O'Doyle shoots his shoulder, causing Bunyan to flee in a river. With the news capturing footage of Bunyan being unarmed, many groups and political parties unite to criticize Curtis and plant trees in support of Bunyan. Since the chase led them to Illinois, governor Beverly Mills arrives and tries to take over the operation, due to Bunyan qualifying for rehabilitation. Curtis flees with O'Doyle to continue the chase, leaving Banks behind. Beverly requests Banks to track Curtis and offers her a position by her side. After tracking Curtis and O'Doyle, the three soon learn that Bunyan is consuming people via trees. Despite apologizing for her lack of loyalty, Curtis admits he only wanted to bring Bunyan down due to his popularity despite his history of being a cannibal. The group confronts and kills Bunyan, who reveals that he is actually the trees themselves, puppeteering Bunyan's head. Beverly arrives afterwards, upset with Banks' choice, and recovers Bunyan's head. Faced with the choice of revealing the truth, Curtis decides to refrain from exposing the trees, as the public's hatred for Curtis has brought them together.

== Production ==
=== Background ===
Wes Archer and Tom Kauffman created Curtis for the Rick and Morty episode "Get Schwifty" as an unnamed stand-in for then-U.S. president Barack Obama. The character was given the surname Curtis in the show's fifth season and the first name Andre in its seventh season.

Harmon later said that Curtis' subsequent appearances were influenced by Donald Trump's 2016 presidential campaign and by "the idea of a cartoonishly bad president". The character was initially depicted as a composite of Obama and Trump before developing into a distinct character over later seasons.

=== Development ===
Adult Swim announced the series after Keith David made a surprise appearance at the network's Rick and Morty panel at San Diego Comic-Con on July 25, 2025. Harmon and Siciliano said the spin-off would allow them to present science-fiction stories from Curtis' perspective and further develop the character's world. The series' executive producers are Harmon, Siciliano, Danielle Uhlarik, Monica Mitchell and Steve Levy.

Harmon said the series was designed to stand on its own rather than duplicate Rick and Morty, comparing the relationship between the two programs to those between Doctor Who and The X-Files. Harmon and Siciliano also said Rick and Morty appear in the premiere but do not return during the remainder of the first season.

Lighthouse Studios provides animation services for Green Portal Productions. The studio had previously animated episodes from the seventh through ninth seasons of Rick and Morty.

In July 2026, Adult Swim renewed the series for a second season.

== Release ==
President Curtis premiered on Adult Swim on July 26, immediately following the ninth-season finale of Rick and Morty, with episodes streaming on HBO Max the following day. The series had its world-premiere screening at the Annecy International Animation Film Festival on June 24, 2026. The first season consists of ten episodes.

== Reception ==
On the review aggregator website Rotten Tomatoes, 100% of 12 critics' reviews are positive, with an average rating of 7.3/10.

== See also ==
- Inside Job, an earlier adult animation TV series about the US government with paranormal elements
