= The President's Daughter series =

Book by Ellen Emerson White

The President's Daughter is a series of four young adult novels written by American author Ellen Emerson White. The series tells the story of Meghan "Meg" Powers as she reacts to her mother's presidential campaign and her experiences while living in the White House.

The series begins with The President’s Daughter published in 1984. The final book in the series was published in 2007. The earlier books were then updated for modern readers and reissued in 2008.

== Plot summary ==
=== The President's Daughter ===
Originally published in 1984, this book starts with Meg's mother announcing to Meg that she will be running for president. Meg struggles throughout the book with her feelings that her mother has chosen her career over her family. After her mother's election, Meg deals with moving to Washington, D.C., changing schools, having secret service agents and the media. She also has to decide with which kids at her new school are really friends and who just wants to know the “president’s daughter”.

=== White House Autumn ===
White House Autumn was originally published in 1985. Meg's begins her senior year of high school becoming more comfortable with her role as the daughter of the first female president. She has friends, her first boyfriend, and is captain of the tennis team. Early in the book, she is pulled out of class because her mother was shot. The rest of the story focuses on Meg's reaction to the shooting and new realization of the potential dangers of her new life.

=== Long Live the Queen ===
Long Live the Queen was originally published in 1989, and went on to win the ALA Best Book for Young Adults. Her family is still coping with the aftermath of her mother's shooting when Meg is kidnapped while leaving school. Meg takes the reader through her quest to survive and recover from her injuries. The majority of the story concerns Meg's thoughts and fears regarding her situation.

=== Long May She Reign ===
Long May She Reign was published in 2007. Meg decides to leave for college at the start of the spring semester even though she is still learning to cope with her injuries. This book is longer than the earlier three and deals with the psychological and physical repercussions of Meg's kidnapping as well as the normal feelings a freshman away from home. Meg struggles to make friends as well as her feelings that another attempt could be made on her or her family. The effects of her trauma on the family as a whole, particularly her mother's refusal to negotiate with the terrorists, are portrayed.

== Main characters ==
=== Meg Powers ===
All four novels are told from Meg's point of view. In the first book, Meg is a sophomore in high school whose mother is a Senator running to be the first female president of the United States. She lived most of her early life in Chestnut Hill, Massachusetts; a suburb of Boston. Meg enjoys skiing, tennis and reading and is a Red Sox fan. She describes herself as shy because she is conscious of the effects her role as the president's daughter has on others. She strongly resembles her mother in appearance and demeanor. In the third book, Meg is kidnapped, severely injured and struggles to handle the changes in her daily life. In the fourth book, these struggles continue as Meg starts attending Williams College.

=== Katherine Vaughn Powers ===
Katherine Vaughn Powers is Meg's mother and the first female President of the United States. At the start of the series, she is a Democratic Senator for Massachusetts. Her mother was killed while horseback riding when Kate was five and that loss affects the relationship between Meg and her mother. She is described in the books as funny, beautiful, and honest. She refuses to negotiate with the terrorists who kidnap Meg in the third book and her relationship with the whole family suffers as a result.

=== Russell James Powers ===
Russell James Powers is Meg's father. He is often described as struggling with his role as First Gentleman and occasionally angry with Kate for the effects her job has on the family. His former job was a tax attorney. Because Kate was in Washington so much of the time, he was the primary parent for Meg and her brothers.

=== Steven Powers ===
Steven Powers is one of Meg's younger brothers. He plays basketball and baseball. He and Meg have a close relationship.

=== Neal Powers ===
Neal Powers is Meg's other younger brother. The books describe him as an adorable and optimistic little boy who frequently gets an upset stomach under stress.

=== Beth Shulman ===
Beth Shulman is Meg's best friend. She lives in the Boston area and attends college in New York but visits Meg in each book. Her parents are divorced and she has a strained relationship with her own mother and father. She often pushes Meg to see her own weaknesses and to step outside her comfort zone.

=== Trudy Donovan ===
Trudy Donovan appears in the first book, The President’s Daughter, as the Powers family housekeeper. After the family moves to Washington D.C., she relocates to Florida to be with her own family. She visits the family in each of the subsequent books and serves as a surrogate grandmother to the Powers children.

=== Preston Fielding ===
Preston Fielding is Russell Powers Press Secretary and close friend of the family. He is one of the few people outside the family that Meg discusses her feelings with. He is described as being very stylish and his outfits are described in detail each time he appears.

== Changes made to 2008 editions ==
Most changes made by the author are updates to modernize the setting. Meg has email and a cell phone. Her favorite drink Tab has been changed to Coke. Her music tastes remain the same, but it is noted that she listens to older music although she listens to it on her computer rather than records.
