= The Man (Wallace novel) =

1964 novel by Irving Wallace

- First edition
- Author: Irving Wallace
- Subject: United States -- Politics and government -- Fiction.
- Publisher: Simon & Schuster
- Publication date: 1964
- Media type: Print (Hardcover, Softcover)
- Pages: 766
- OCLC: 711242
- Dewey Decimal: 813.54
- LC Class: PZ4.W1875 Man PS3573.A426

The Man is a 1964 novel by Irving Wallace that speculatively explores the socio-political consequences in U.S. society when a black man becomes President of the United States. The novel's title derives from the contemporary—fifties, sixties, seventies—American slang English, "The Man".

== Plot summary ==
The Man was written before the Twenty-fifth Amendment to the United States Constitution. It depicts a political situation in which the office of Vice Presidency is vacant due to the incumbent's death. While overseas in Germany, the President and the Speaker of the House are in a freak accident; the President is killed, the Speaker of the House later dies in surgery. The Presidency then devolves onto Douglass Dilman, the President Pro Tempore of the Senate, a black man earlier elected to that office in deference to his race. Dilman's presidency is challenged by white racists, black political activists, and an attempted assassination. Later, he is impeached on false charges for firing the United States Secretary of State. One of his children, who is "passing" for white, is targeted and harassed. At the end of the book, the protagonist—though having credibly dealt with considerable problems during his presidency and gained some popularity—does not consider running for re-election.

== Historical context ==
The impeachment trial of President Douglass Dilman closely parallels that of President Andrew Johnson (at the time the only Presidential impeachment proceedings to reach the articles stage, before Bill Clinton in 1998 and Donald Trump in 2019 and 2021).

The book was written at the time when the Civil Rights Movement was at its peak and the issue of Black Americans' equality high on the American agenda. However, it was published prior to passage of the Civil Rights Act of 1964 and the Voting Rights Act of 1965, so the notion of an African-American man running for and being elected President was so outlandish that it would not have been taken seriously.

== Commercial reception ==
The Man was a major commercial success: it spent 38 weeks (peaking at #2) on the New York Times best seller list. It became the fifth-highest selling novel of the year.

== Film adaptation ==
In 1972, the novel was adapted as a political drama screenplay by Rod Serling, directed by Joseph Sargent and featuring James Earl Jones as President Douglass Dilman.
