= President Curtis (Rick and Morty character) =

- Rick and Morty / President Curtis character
- First appearance: "Get Schwifty" (2015; Rick and Morty)
- Created by: Wes Archer; Tom Kauffman
- Based on: Barack Obama ("Get Schwifty"); Donald Trump ("The Rickchurian Mortydate"); Mitt Romney ("Edge of Tomorty: Rick Die Rickpeat")
- Designed by: Justin Roiland
- Voiced by: English: Keith David; Spanish: Angel Balam; Anime: Fuminori Komatsu (Japanese) Shawn Hamilton (English)

In-universe information
- Full name: Andre Curtis; M. Romney
- Species: Human
- Gender: Male
- Title: Mr. President
- Occupation: President of the United States; U.S. Marine (formerly); Governor (formerly)
- Affiliation: The Pentagon; United States Congress; United States Marine Corps
- Significant others: Dr. Helen Wong; Gov. Beverly Mills (ex-wife)

45th President of the United States
- In office 2013; years prior to "Get Schwifty" – present (floating timeline; still President as of 2024)
- Relatives: Turkey President (biological duplicate)
- Home: White House, 1600 Pennsylvania Avenue NW, Washington, D.C.

President Andre Curtis, originally simply referred to as The President, is a recurring fictional character in the American animated television series Rick and Morty and the titular main protagonist of the spin-off series President Curtis. He is voiced by Keith David and was created by Wes Archer and Tom Kauffman. The character was initially unnamed and based on then-sitting Presidents of the United States Barack Obama and Donald Trump in his first two appearances before being given the surname Curtis in the fifth season.

Curtis has a love–hate relationship with Rick Sanchez, alternately calling on him and his grandson, Morty Smith, to protect America from various threats and attempting to have Rick arrested or killed. In "Edge of Tomorty: Rick Die Rickpeat", an alternate reality version of the President's name is stated to be M. Romney (in reference to Mitt Romney) while in all of his later appearances, his name is revealed as Andre Curtis. Known for his abrasive, pompous personality and humorous incompetence, the character has received a positive critical reception.

In December 2022, President Curtis was added as a playable character in the role-playing video game Pocket Mortys.

On July 25, 2025, a self-titled spin-off series focusing on President Curtis was announced at San Diego Comic-Con and premiered in July 2026.

== Development ==
The character was created by Wes Archer and Tom Kauffman for the 2015 Rick and Morty second season episode "Get Schwifty", initially written as a generic unnamed stand-in for then-sitting President of the United States Barack Obama. In September 2017, Dan Harmon confirmed that the writing for the tail-end of the series' third season had occurred during Donald Trump's then-ongoing presidential campaign was inspired by "the idea of a cartoonishly bad president" for the character's appearance in "The Rickchurian Mortydate" in contrast to their original depiction, following "how out of control presidential power has gotten"; by the time the episode aired in October 2017, Trump had been elected and serving in the office for almost a year. Keith David, who voices the character, previously voiced a fictionalised version of himself as Vice President of the United States in the 2013 video game Saints Row IV, and Reverse Giraffe in the second season episode "Total Rickall".

== Biography ==
=== Rick and Morty ===
In the first season episode "M. Night Shaym-Aliens!", while Rick Sanchez is trapped inside of a holographic projection, an ambulance pulls up with some paramedics yelling out that the President of the United States is inside having a stroke, and that they need "10 CCs of concentrated dark matter" to save his life, as part of a plan by Zigerion scammers to steal its recipe from Rick. Under a sheet, only the President's (simulated) hand is seen.

==== Season 2 ====
In the second season episode "Get Schwifty", the President meets Rick and his grandson Morty Smith in the Pentagon after the pair teleport in to inform the U.S. government as to the identity of the massive alien head which has appeared over the Earth, interfering with its gravity and spawning several global disasters: a Cromulon, seeking a live performance of a catchy new song lest the planet be destroyed. The President orders Rick and Morty to compose a song to save them. After they save Earth, the President declares the pair heroes. In "Lawnmower Dog" and "A Rickconvenient Mort", Summer Smith references both Barack and Michelle Obama as existing as the President's predecessors in office, the President having been elected after them.

==== Seasons 3–5 ====
In the third season finale "The Rickchurian Mortydate", having since called on Rick and Morty countless times, the President calls upon the duo once again to exterminate "some kind of alien googa" from the Kennedy Sex Tunnels under the White House. After Rick and Morty refuse and separate themselves from the President, he has the pair arrested as they attempt to make first contact with a miniature civilization discovered in the Amazon rainforest. Upon shrinking himself to meet with them, he finds the aliens have been dealt with; the President declares war on Rick and Morty. Rick promises to leave their reality for good in exchange for another one on the condition that Morty gets a selfie with the President. Rick indirectly kills most of the Secret Service agents surrounding him, culminating in a lengthy brawl with the President. The conflict ends with a truce.

In the fourth season premiere "Edge of Tomorty: Rick Die Rickpeat", upon finding himself in a cloned body in a fascist dimension, Rick briefly sees a signed photograph of his counterpart shaking hands with the President's own counterpart, signed "M. Romney". In the fifth season episode "Mortyplicity", the President is alerted by his staff as to the decoys of the Smith family killing each other across America.

In "Rickdependence Spray", the Smith family is airlifted to the Pentagon's war room by the President, where Morty agrees to lie for Rick and tells the President that they know nothing about the outbreak of Sperm Monsters, claiming them to be from space. At Morty's suggestion, the President sends Rick, Morty, and a helicopter full of marines and nuclear weapons to the Grand Canyon to destroy the sperm. Summer volunteers an egg as a solution, and soldiers plan to shoot it into space after all the sperm enter the egg. After the sperm and their queen are killed, one sperm manages to fertilizes the egg himself out of instinct. Summer attempts to destroy her egg, but the President intervenes because he cannot be publicly seen condoning abortion. Sometime later, before the events of "Gotron Jerrysis Rickvangelion", the President has Summer brought to her "Giant Incest Baby" on Mars by the military.

In "Rick & Morty's Thanksploitation Spectacular", the President attempts to have Rick and Morty arrested after Morty accidentally unleashes a giant robotic assassin from inside the Statue of Liberty along with destroying the U.S. Constitution. The President has sent out multiple armored trucks, only one of which contains the presidential turkeys and will be guarded by turkey marines. Rick plans to sneak aboard by turning himself into a turkey. The President has himself also turned into a turkey to identify Rick. The marines pull out the wrong turkey and inject it with the President's DNA. While Rick and Morty return home and restore the President to human form, the Turkey President begins turning turkeys into large, muscular turkey-human soldiers. Observing on the news that the Turkey President plans to turn every turkey in America into soldiers, the President frees a group of previously warring alien species united by their hatred of turkeys. The President fights his turkey counterpart in hand-to-hand combat, ultimately defeating him. The President gives Rick a true pardon afterwards.

==== Seasons 6–7 ====
Following the Smith family switching realities at the end of the sixth season premiere "Solaricks" to a near-identical one where "parmesan" is pronounced differently, after everyone on their previous reality's Earth (including the President) is absorbed by Mr. Frundles, Rick tricks the new reality's President into pardoning him as a turkey again offscreen in "Bethic Twinstinct" by turning himself into a "Turkey Dracula". The new reality's President is formally introduced in "Juricksic Mort", where the President's surname is confirmed to be "Curtis", as he seeks Rick's help in ridding the world of the technologically advanced dinosaurs who have peacefully (re)taken over the planet (a takeover the President had initially allowed out of fear of "the poor" killing him and the other world leaders should they tell the dinosaurs to leave), an offer Rick accepts in exchange for the President arranging for him to host the Oscars; while insulted that Rick wouldn't consider taking him as his plus one, the President is calmed once Rick provides him with his specialised "molly".

In the season finale, "Ricktional Mortpoon's Rickmas Mortcation", after Rickbot (a "22%-more-agreeable" robotic duplicate of Rick) gives Morty a working Star Wars lightsaber, and he accidentally drops it "perfectly fucking vertical", tunnelling into the Earth, the President arrives at the Smith family household to deride Morty for doing so, criticising the acquisition of the property by Disney and the perceived poor quality of the Star Wars sequel trilogy. After convincing Rick to help build a device that would allow the President and Morty to retrieve the descending lightsaber before it reaches the core and destroys the planet, the President confiscates the lightsaber for himself, and on later playing with it in the White House, accidentally drops it "perfectly fucking vertical" himself, publicly blaming Morty for the descent while launching the White House into space to protect himself. Later, after Morty and Rickbot retrieve the lightsaber, they travel to space to seek revenge on the President, destroying the White House before Rick rescues them via a portal to their garage. After Rickbot succumbs to his injuries and dies, the President nonchalantly asks Rick for a new White House and Morty for a taxicab, before awkwardly leaving the house.

In the seventh season episode "Air Force Wong", the President begins dating Rick's therapist Dr. Wong (over the course of which his first name is revealed as "Andre"), a concept Rick greatly disapproves of, leading to the President mandate they work together in investigating the entirety of the state of Virginia having apparently joined a cult, which turns out to be the hive mind and Rick's ex-girlfriend Unity. After tricking Unity into leaving by cutting her off from her hive mind, after which she notes Virginia to still be susceptible to falling under the control of another hive mind, and Dr. Wong then breaks up with the President, citing he needs to overcome his obsession for everybody's approval, the President finally cracks under the pressure and hijacks the Virginia hive mind for himself, disabling the barrier and spreading it the infection across the world to fulfill his desire for 100% approval ratings. With no other choice, Rick enlists Dr. Wong's aid to convince Unity to stop the President. Unity agrees to help and removes all of the infected humans from the hive mind and life on Earth returns to normal. Rick and the President later have beers together and the President considers getting therapy.

In "Rise of the Numbericons: The Movie", a flashback shows the governor-who-would-be-President campaigning in the 1990s, seeking the support of Ice-T through his math teacher Mr. Goldenfold.

=== President Curtis ===
==== Season 1 ====
In "Pilot", President Curtis has a dispute with the CIA over leaked tapes.

== In other media ==
In the comic series issue "Close Rick-counters of the Drippy Kind", set on May 31, 2017, the President arrives at the Smith household to get Rick's advice on how to deal with the "space racists" Spatio 5 Culus, whose armada have been cleared to invade Earth by the Galactic Federation. The President instead takes the advice of Rick's son-in-law Jerry Smith, who ends up in an argument with the aliens' leader within ten minutes. After being told that Congress was unable to prevent him from making the bad decision of having Jerry help because they were at Capitol Hill, the President sends Jerry home; Rick subsequently destroys the alien race. With the situation resolved, the President returns to the Smith household to thank Rick, telling him that "We owe you one, baby!" before leaving once again.

In Rick and Morty: Wormageddon, a "living episode" aired ahead of and set simultaneously with the sixth season premiere "Solaricks", an alternate version of the President attends a party at the Smith family's house, before tag-team defeating one of the invading worms alongside his Rick.

In December 2022, the President was then added as a playable character in the role-playing video game Pocket Mortys, and again as a minor antagonist in the comic series limited series Crisis on C-137 and in a supporting role in the story arc The Space Shake Saga.

== Reception ==
The character has received positive reception. Inverse praised the President's depiction in "The Rickchurian Mortydate" as "a petulant manbaby who can't take criticism or disobedience" and Donald Trump stand-in compared to his "Get Schwifty" depiction, describing the character's final fight with Rick Sanchez as "the single greatest action sequence in Rick and Morty history". Vulture described the character as "feel[ing]… anachronistic", with IndieWire complimenting "it mak[ing] sense that the main issue powering this President/Rick feud is that each of them think they're too good at their job" and describing "interactions with The President [as] feel[ing] like a subtle jab at the rest of the TV world" before praising how Keith David's vocal performance "handling the presidential shame list with the shame joyful enthusiasm as digging into shouting "You suck!" makes him a legend in the show's annals, even if The President has only popped up twice." Reason lauded the political commentary of the character and the concepts of "imperial presidency" and "how out of control presidential power has gotten", commenting on how the series' decision "not to model its president on any specific real-life equivalent [avoids] being a commentary on any [one] specific officeholder and instead becomes a stinging commentary on the office itself", while Screen Rant described the President as "a welcome addition as a great antagonist for Rick and sometimes ally", expressing hope that "their rivalry and back and forth will continue" to be expanded upon throughout the series. Contrastingly, Variety criticized the President's increased role in the series' fifth season, stating the "Rick and the President messarounds have never actually been the most interesting or exciting plots of the series", although expressing interest in a future appearance by the character exploring a romantic connection between the pair.
