= Rick and Morty season 9 =

Season of television series

Rick and Morty
- Season 9
- Showrunner: Scott Marder
- Starring: Chris Parnell; Spencer Grammer; Sarah Chalke; Ian Cardoni; Harry Belden
- No. of episodes: 10

Release
- Original network: Adult Swim
- Original release: May 24 – July 26, 2026

Season chronology
- ← Previous; Season 8

The ninth season of the American adult animated television series Rick and Morty premiered on Adult Swim on May 24, 2026.

== Cast and characters ==
=== Main ===
- Chris Parnell as Jerry Smith 5126, Morty and Summer's father, Beth's husband, and Rick's son-in-law.
- Spencer Grammer as Summer Smith C-131, Morty's older sister and Rick's granddaughter.
- Sarah Chalke as Beth Smith and Space Beth Sanchez, Morty's and Summer's mothers, Jerry's wives, and Rick's daughters (one is a clone created by Rick).
- Ian Cardoni as Rick Sanchez C-137, one of the show's two lead characters and Morty's grandfather, often shown as drunk.
- Harry Belden as:
  - Morty Smith, one of the show's two lead characters and Rick's grandson, often shown as nervous, unsure of himself and doubtful about Rick's extravagant adventures
  - "Evil Morty", a version of Morty who left the Central Finite Curve behind.

=== Guests ===
- GaTa as Fourth-Dimensional Prisoner
- Keegan-Michael Key as Fourth-Dimensional Being #1
- Tilda Swinton as The Collective
- Eddie Pepitone as Fourth-Dimensional Being #2
- Tom Kenny as:
  - Bunker Gene
  - Bus Ticket Taker
- Ed Helms as Big Mike
- Paul Lieberstein as Little Mike
- Oscar Nunez as Antonio
- Rob Riggle as Bowser
- Amy Ryan as Marjorie
- Tom Choi as Master Liu Sin
- Michaela Dietz as Stephanie Jergins
- Rich Fulcher as King Flippy Nips
- Owen Wilson as Reese
- Rob Paulsen as Snowball
- Ty Burrell as Bob
- Stephen Root as:
  - Carl Nipslip
  - Butch
- Paget Brewster as Rachel
- John Hodgman as Tree Warden
- Justin Long as an unnamed alien that operated as Gorilla #3 and Hyena #3
- Bill Camp as:
  - Announcer
  - Sergeant Marlowe (Note: Sergeant Marlowe's real name has been revealed in the closed captioning.)
- Andy Serkis as the Cat and Mouse Killer
- Brandon Johnson as Mr. Goldenfold
- Phil Hendrie as Principal Gene Vagina
- Janeane Garofalo as:
  - Big Margo
  - Lintana
- Joe Lo Truglio as:
  - Excee
  - Joost
- Ken Marino as:
  - Mauldin
  - Zarz
- Malin Akerman as Uli
- Carlos Alazraqui as MIT Director
- Jon Allen as Mr. Wayne Poopybutthole
- Lauren Tom as Mrs. Amy Poopybutthole

== Episodes ==
No. overall	No. in season	Title	Directed by	Written by	Original release date	U.S. viewers (millions)
82	1	"There's Something About Morty"	Douglas Einar Olsen	Albro Lundy	May 24, 2026	N/A
Morty discovers that Rick has been texting with Evil Morty and becomes outraged. Rick reveals that Evil Morty has captured copies of their family and put them in the Omega Device, threatening to erase them from all universes if Rick doesn't help him. They fight a multiversal entity called The Collective with Evil Morty, then head to a diner with him. Evil Morty mocks Morty for not being good enough for Rick. After leaving the diner, Evil Morty discovers that his lair and Omega Device blueprints have been destroyed by Rick. Evil Morty arrives to Rick's home and the two begin to fight, during which Morty calls Evil Morty out because he never had a Rick care for him. Evil Morty then freezes time to attempt to kill Rick. However, before he can do so, the Time Police arrive and arrest Evil Morty. Rick called in a tip to the Time Police before the fight, anticipating Evil Morty would freeze time. Post-credits scene: In Time Prison, Evil Morty is told by a guard that his punishment is being forced to live in general population in real time instead of being put into stasis during his eternal sentence.
83	2	"Ricks Days, Seven Nights"	Brian Kaufman	Jess Lacher	May 31, 2026	N/A
Rick removes his memories and some of his intelligence to take an annual vacation on the less technologically advanced planet of Beloi 6E as "Ted". However, a robbery activates Rick's cybernetic enhancements, and Ted becomes aware of Rick and decides to never leave. Rick's contingencies to force Ted to restore his memories accidentally kills Ted's friend Marjorie. Ted vows war on Rick and builds a spaceship back to Earth, but discovers Rick's family and no one to fight. He instead picks up Rick's life and gives his friends tech enhancements. Ted slowly becomes depressed and unsatisfied with his friends, ultimately reverting to the emotional state of Rick. At his low point, Ted chooses to return his memories and become Rick again, hoping that by restoring himself to full intelligence he might know how to be happier. Rick comes to and is still as depressed as Ted was. Post-credits scene: Rick is under a new vacation alias about to be married to a squid-like alien. This time, Morty and Summer successfully get Rick in the capsule as Summer explains to the aliens who he really was.
84	3	"Rick Fu Hustle"	Daniel Cole & Fill Marc Sagadraca	Rob Schrab	June 7, 2026	N/A
Jerry is frustrated because the pool cleaning robot that he bought is ineffective, and Beth tells him he should have hired Keith the Pool Guy. Meanwhile, Rick and Morty are finally heading to Boob World, but make a stop that leads to an altercation in a Trader Joe's parking lot with kung fu master Liu Sin, who uses a punch that will kill Rick if he takes five steps forward. Morty encounters Liu again and wants to learn from him, but quickly realizes he uses the death punch on anyone who even slightly bothers him, causing him to use the technique on Morty. Rick and Morty visit Liu's master, Gerd Jergins, in order to collect data to cure the death punch. Back home, Jerry installs a large language model upgrade into his pool cleaner, which cleans the pool but then has a sexual affair with Jerry. Jerry realizes he needs to hire Keith to clean the pool, but the robot becomes jealous and attacks Keith. Having reverse engineered kung fu using the data they collected, Rick and Morty confront Liu, resulting in a fight that triggers mass destruction and summons a demon god named Punchy, who forces them to defeat a monster using a technique that Liu had failed to master. Once the pool cleaner breaks in and floods the home to kill Keith, Jerry and Keith work together to defeat it. Then the Smith family hosts a pool party. Post-credits scene: Beth is in a sexual relationship with her sentient hair dryer, and Jerry asks her to put a cardboard cutout of his face on it. Beth and the hair dryer dislike this experience.
85	4	"A Ricker Runs Through It"	Fill Marc Sagadraca & Daniel Cole	Story by : Nick Rutherford; Teleplay by : Jax Ball & Albro Lundy	June 14, 2026	N/A
Rick drunkenly locks himself out of his garage security system, arguing with Morty about it. Their argument is interrupted by a call from Reese, a friend who invites the pair on a fishing trip. After returning home from the trip, it is revealed that Reese is a robot that Rick uses to unlock his security system when he gets locked out. Morty is furious about this revelation and tries to prevent Rick from terminating him by taking Reese to a dimension with hog people who work to keep Rick's flask filled with liquor. Meanwhile, Rick calls a tech support company who transfers the consciousness of one of their technicians into Jerry's body. The hog people end up using Reese to hack into Rick's house and activate the defense systems, including appliances and furniture, against them. After receiving help from the technician in Jerry's body, they shut off all the tech in the house, but the hog people send a brainwashed Reese to attack the family. Reese is only subdued in response to Rick and Morty arguing with each other. The situation is fully resolved by Rick allowing the technician to transfer its consciousness into Reese. After it leaves, Rick begins drinking heavily again, disappointing Morty. Post-credits scene: Rick is locked out of his garage system again and a man shows up saying he is a new neighbor wanting to hang out, and Morty stabs him thinking he is another robot. Right after stabbing the neighbor, Rick gets a call from Georgie Boy, who shows up to the garage as the new Reese, much to Morty's dismay.
86	5	"Jer Bud"	Brian Kaufman	James Siciliano	June 21, 2026	N/A
As Jerry prepares for a job interview, Morty leaves the house to go visit his old dog Snowball on a planet colonized by cyborg dogs at the end of "Lawnmower Dog". Morty feels uncomfortable by the humanoid pets that the dogs have bred, called Mups, especially after he witnesses the inhumane Mup-breeding process and discovers that there is a resistance by the Mancors, mandrill-like aliens who are the wild ancestors of Mups, fighting against their dog rulers. Morty inadvertently leads the Mup resistance after almost being arrested by Snowball. This culminates in a brawl between Morty and Snowball, but the two eventually reconcile. Back on Earth, Jerry takes a Flaxian worm from Space Beth, which eats away a person's worries. Jerry consumes too many worms, leading to him nailing his interview with a man named Bob. Rick, Space Beth and Beth realize that the worms want to continue feeding off of Jerry's anxiety by coercing him to make absurd comments to the interviewer and a potential client. Jerry's uninhibited confidence leads to him landing the job and client, erasing his worries and causing the Flaxian worms to look for a new host before Rick contains them. Rick then uses the worms to rectify the damage done on Snowball's planet after the Mup uprising by feeding them to the dogs, Mups, and Mancors. Post-credits scene: Jerry is interrupted during a virtual meeting by Bob, telling his new clients, the Flaxian worm-influenced dogs and Mups, that he loves working with them because they're so chill.
87	6	"Erickerhead"	Eugene Huang	Albro Lundy & Scott Marder	June 28, 2026	N/A
Rick, Morty and Summer are in an alien restaurant where Rick gets very drunk. As they are leaving, Rick opens a portal. Morty and Summer protest this because they drove Rick's car there and don't want to leave it. Rick enters the portal and Summer follows him, but Morty stays behind telling him to remain and find the car. Rick sticks his head through the portal to argue with Morty, resulting in the portal closing and decapitating Rick. This leaves Morty on one side of the portal with Rick's head and Summer on the other side with his body. Summer brings Rick's headless body to a technician who equips it with sentience, but the technician sells them out. Morty and Summer are able to reunite Rick's head and body, but they don't want to join back together after blaming each other for Rick's psychological problems and alcoholism. The head and body end up trying to kill each other but eventually settle their differences and rejoin together. Summer infers that Rick's head performed fellatio on his body as a way to settle their fight, but Rick denies this. Rick tells the kids that he has learned from the experience and wants to be a better person, forcing Morty and Summer to exercise with him and ultimately place third in an interplanetary version of the Olympics. In the end, all three go back to the alien restaurant and indulge in the all-you-can-eat food. Post-credits scene: Rick sticks his head through a portal to talk to Morty, making Morty anxious. The portal seemingly closes on him as it did before, but Rick reveals it was a practical joke and the portal didn't fully close before saying goodbye to the audience in a parody of Looney Tunes even though he couldn't afford to use its closing number.
88	7	"MortGully: The Last Rickforest"	Daniel Cole	Michael Kellner	July 5, 2026	N/A
Rick and Morty travel to a remote alien planet to harvest special sap from a tree located there. However the tree called the Warden reveals himself to be intelligent and captures them both. As punishment for trying to harvest his sap, the Warden banishes Rick and Morty underground, where they are devolved into single celled organisms. They quickly discover that they can rapidly evolve themselves into more complex organisms, but if they are killed they start over as single celled organisms. Eventually, Rick manages to evolve himself into a baboon and organizes the other prisoners to attempt to break out of the Warden's prison by scaling his trunk. However, the Warden thwarts all escape attempts. Morty tries living as an herbivore and later a plant. As a tree, he manages to reach the surface only to be banished back underground by the Warden. Both Rick and Morty realize the accelerated cycle of life they are trapped in only exists to provide nutrients to the Warden, so they organize the rest of the prisoners to subsist on the fruits and vegetables produced by Morty and avoid killing each other to deny the Warden sustenance. Without nutrients, the Warden is weakened enough that the prisoners are able to ambush and kill him. Rick and Morty subsequently escape with the sap, leaving the other prisoners stuck in their animal bodies. Post-credits scene: While stopping at an alien diner, Rick and Morty pass by a pair of aliens they recognize as former prisoners who managed to escape the planet and regain their original bodies.
89	8	"Rickuiem Mort a Dream"	Douglas Einar Olsen	Heather Anne Campbell	July 12, 2026	N/A
While Rick works in his underground distillery with a rare space potato, Morty ignores a warning not to disturb him and accidentally causes the entire distillery to explode. After lashing out on Morty, Rick tries to make amends by giving Morty a "sympathid", an alien ear bug that feeds on empathy and makes Morty hallucinate the most empathetic versions of whatever anyone says or does to him. Rick and Morty use this parasite-induced emotional connection to win a dance competition for a replacement space potato. Rick removes the sympathid after they win the competition, but Morty puts it back into his ear to deal with everyone else's cruelty. His hyper-empathy spirals out of control, to the point where he empathizes with an explosion that blows his arm off. Meanwhile, Rick had sent Jerry and Summer into town to buy 60-gallon drums for his rebuilt distillery, but discover that all the drums have been hoarded by a serial killer. To get the drums, Summer convinces Jerry to pose as a fellow serial killer. As Summer and the killer's latest kidnap victim load the drums into their car, Jerry talks about a fake serial killer's signature so disturbing that it convinces the killer to call the police on Jerry. Rick removes the now gargantuan sympathid from Morty's head, but it migrates into Rick, leaving Morty with brain damage that makes him an unempathetic psychopath (Note: Nod to Evil Morty), while Rick becomes unbearably empathetic towards everything. Morty realizes Rick is always furious because he had to carry Morty and his emotions even in dangerous situations. Morty then goes to save Jerry from the police as the serial killer is shot by them. Rick kills the sympathid by drinking his space vodka. Post-credits scene: A flashback reveals Morty's attempts to comfort his teacher Miss Underwood while under the effects of the sympathid actually failed at this part spectacularly.
90	9	"Salute Your Morts"	Brian Kaufman	Garrick Bernard	July 19, 2026	N/A
Morty and Summer get expelled from school for their bad attitude and use of alien technology and drugs, so Rick scares Principal Vagina into overturning their expulsion by turning him into a human-carrot hybrid and back again. Beth berates Rick for enabling her kids by bailing them out, so he confiscates the technology he gave them and sends them both to a sleepaway camp for spoiled rich children. The camp however had been taken over by the other campers who killed the counselors and now do nothing but consume drugs and beer and party. Though Morty and Summer enjoy it at first, they quickly get tired of the constant partying and try to leave, but this makes the other campers want to kill them. Back at home, Beth and Jerry raid Summer's room for drugs and smoke an alien drug called "High Forever". They attempt to go to another galaxy for medication to end their long lasting high, but their intoxication only causes immense trouble for themselves. When they find that the medication doesn't work, Jerry calls Rick for help, but Rick had also taken High Forever while they were away. Morty and Summer escape the camp and call Rick at a nearby town, but the townspeople decide to raid the camp and hold the campers for ransom. With Rick and their parents too high to be of any help, Morty and Summer rally the campers to kill their captors. Afterwards, the campers go home with their parents and Space Beth takes the Smith family home. During the trip home, Jerry and "Earth Beth" remain extremely high and complain to Space Beth about how Space Beth won't have throuple polyamorous sex with them anymore. Rick is also extremely high and constantly interrupts everyone about Del Taco. Morty and Summer are mortified at the conversation and respond that they've been scared straight. Post-credits scene: Jerry is at work pitching an advertisement, but sees Rick standing outside and is scared he will turn him into a carrot.
91	10	"Field of Dreams"	Eugene Huang	Heather Anne Campbell & Jess Lacher	July 26, 2026	N/A
Rick and Morty go to the universe of a recently deceased Smith family, where an estate sale auctions off their belongings. After a conversation with a Sunglasses Morty about attending several of his own funerals in order to hear what the family would say about him, Morty finds and begins using a Portal Gun Jr to dimension hop to several of his own funerals. Eventually, he is discovered by a successful Smith family mourning the loss of their Morty, called Mort. Morty learns that, in this reality, a more confident and assertive Jerry kicked Rick out of the family seventeen years ago. Mort's Jerry gives Morty house keys and the opportunity to return any time. Returning to his own reality and being disappointed by his family's dysfunctionality, Morty spends more time with Mort's family. At a remote cabin alone with Mort's Jerry, Morty considers staying until Mort's Jerry destroys Morty's Portal Gun Jr to force him to permanently replace Mort. Morty flees and discovers a hidden bunker built by Mort and finds a diary where Mort admits frustration in Jerry's desire to push Mort to overachieve, resulting in his death. Morty goes to MIT where he finds that the Rick of this universe eventually quit drinking, remarried, and became a successful mathematics professor. Morty convinces Sober Rick to make a new Portal Gun so that he can go home. However, Sober Rick can't figure out how to get the technology working; his inability to do so causes him to relapse into drinking and convinces his wife Uli to leave him. Mort's family tracks down Sober Rick, and upon seeing his drunk state and unsuccessful portal experiment, engage in a gunfight that results in the death of everyone but Morty. Subsequently, this starts another estate sale and Morty reunites with his Rick. A traumatized Morty then uses one of Sober Rick's inventions to transform Sunglasses Morty into a long-necked dog. Upon returning home, Morty despondently goes to his room where his family is indifferent to him. Later that night, Rick wakes up Morty and rides with him on his new motorcycle and finds solace in knowing he and Rick truly are closer than most Ricks and Mortys. The two ride into the sunset, proclaiming themselves father and son. Post-credits scene: Mr. Poopybutthole is strapped to a dimensional ship that will use his DNA for Amy to find her original husband, but the experiment goes awry and they and those with them all disappear from the laboratory.

== Background ==
=== Development ===
In January 2023, it was confirmed that the long-term deal had renewed Rick and Morty through to a tenth season. In October 2024, the show was renewed for two more seasons up until season 12 with 20 more episodes.

== Release ==
The season premiered on Adult Swim on May 24, 2026.

== Reception ==
On the review aggregator Rotten Tomatoes, season 9 has a 100% score based on 9 reviews.
