= Rick and Morty season 8 =

Rick and Morty
- Season 8
- Promotional poster
- Showrunner: Scott Marder
- Starring: Chris Parnell; Spencer Grammer; Sarah Chalke; Ian Cardoni; Harry Belden
- No. of episodes: 10

Release
- Original network: Adult Swim
- Original release: May 25 – July 27, 2025

Season chronology
- ← Previous; Season 7 Next → Season 9

The eighth season of the American adult animated television series Rick and Morty premiered on May 25, 2025 and ended on July 27, 2025. It consists of ten episodes.

The season was ordered before the fourth season of the show finished airing, in May 2020, as part of an order consisting of 70 episodes.

== Voice cast and characters ==
=== Main ===
- Ian Cardoni as Rick Sanchez C-137, one of the show's two lead characters and Morty's grandfather. Cardoni also voices Homesteader Rick and several Rick clones.
- Harry Belden as Morty Smith Prime, one of the show's two lead characters and Rick's grandson, often shown as nervous, unsure of himself and doubtful about Rick's extravagant adventures. Belden also voices several Morty clones.
- Chris Parnell as Jerry Smith 5126, Morty and Summer's father, Beth's husband, and Rick's son-in-law.
- Spencer Grammer as Summer Smith C-131, Morty's older sister and Rick's granddaughter.
- Sarah Chalke as Beth Smith and Space Beth Sanchez, Morty's and Summer's mothers, Jerry's wives, and Rick's daughters.
  - Coraline Butterworth as Young Beth and Young Space Beth

=== Guest ===
- Stephen Root as General Ronkonkomus Joe
- Ebon Moss-Bachrach as Christ Trooper General Reinhard Kincaid
- Danny DeVito as Dr. Dogballs
- Kate Micucci as an unnamed alien girl Morty has a minor fling with, additional voices
- Tom Kenny as Gene
- James Gunn as himself
- Zack Snyder as himself
- Charlie Day as Salvatron
- Eliza Coupe as "Pre-Cog" robots
- Maurice LaMarche as Morty Jr.
- John Rhys-Davies as Buganne's Father
- Georgia King as Buganne's Mother
- Tom Davis as Jackpoo
- Jon Allen as Mr. Poopybutthole

== Episodes ==
No. overall	No. in season	Title	Directed by	Written by	Original release date	U.S. viewers (millions)
72	1	"Summer of All Fears"	Fill Marc Sagadraca	Jess Lacher	May 25, 2025	0.30
Summer and Morty escape from a Matrix they've been trapped in by Rick, as a punishment for stealing his phone charger. As a result, the two have mentally aged and matured into different personalities; Summer has become more confident and intelligent while Morty is an ex-soldier, riddled with PTSD. Beth initially connects with and appreciates the more mature Summer, but soon becomes irritated by her overconfidence and criticisms, and attempts to erase Summer's memories, prompting Summer to flee to Santa Fe. Meanwhile, Morty builds a home-made tank with Rick, before stealing it and using it in an attempt to remove the need for electricity and chargers; a trauma due to his time in the Matrix. Summer and Beth eventually reconcile, and, upon learning of Morty's rampage, Summer goes to stop Morty, convincing him to stand down. Morty and Summer agree to have their memories wiped and return to their normal selves. Morty gets a tattoo to remember his fellow soldiers, although fails to realize the significance upon losing the memories while Summer ignores a video message from her mature self. Post-credits scene: Beth realizes that all the middle-aged women in the Sante Fe spa she found Summer in are Age Vampires and is forced to fight her way out.
73	2	"Valkyrick"	Jacob Hair	Scott Marder	June 1, 2025	0.47
Space Beth goes on an unauthorized mission to assassinate the Gromflomite Queen only to find the queen already killed. As she attempts to escape, she calls Rick out of desperation. After Rick saves her, the Defiance show a news report showing the Gromflomite Queen alive, resulting in her being kicked out of the Defiance. Rick and Space Beth decide to investigate the matter themselves and learn that the queen was assassinated by her former royal doctor, Fantabulous, who engineered a special fungus that mutates Gromflomites into significantly stronger and more vicious versions of themselves, intending to use them as super soldiers for galactic domination. The queen refused to help in his project, so he killed and replaced her with a robot containing a bomb that will spread the fungus through a massive gathering of Gromflomite citizens. While Space Beth and Rick manage to safely get rid of the bomb, Space Beth shows signs of infection, showing the fungus can also infect non-insect species. To develop a cure and stage an assault on the hive, Rick and Space Beth form a truce with both the Galactic Federation and the Defiance. Together, they destroy the hive and kill Fantabulous. Post-credits scene: Cisco (one of Rick's allies that was unavailable) wakes up in his apartment and panics, realizing he stood up Rick due to passing out from drug abuse.
74	3	"The Rick, The Mort & The Ugly"	Brian Kaufman	Albro Lundy, James Siciliano & Michael Kellner	June 8, 2025	0.33
In a framing story, Rick and Morty land here due to a cracked windshield on their spaceship. On a wild west asteroid containing Rick and Morty clones, a Rick clone lives as a homestead farmer. As Homesteader Rick gets supplies from a Morty clone running an arcade, the town is raided by a gang of other Rick clones that kidnap all the Morty clones, burn down the town and gun down Homesteader Rick. The Morty clones are brought to a fatter Rick clone known as "Boss Hogg Rick" who intends to use the Morty clones to create a new Citadel. Homesteader Rick survives and he sets out to get revenge, along with Arcade Morty and his friend Doc Morty. As Homesteader Rick and Arcade Morty track down and kill the raider Rick clones, Doc Morty dies and the two are captured by Boss Hogg Rick, who reveals Homesteader Rick actually isn't a clone, but a real Rick that was in charge of making Rick and Morty clones for the Citadel. Homesteader Rick stays behind and sacrifices himself to kill Boss Hogg Rick as Arcade Morty frees the other Morty clones and drops them off at other planets of their choice. Arcade Morty returns to Homesteader Rick's house to give him and Doc Morty a burial. Post-credits scene: Two dice with arms and legs dig themselves out of the wreckage of the Citadel and start fighting each other.
75	4	"The Last Temptation of Jerry"	Douglas Einar Olsen	Heather Anne Campbell	June 15, 2025	0.38
Jerry attempts to celebrate Easter with the family, but everyone rebuffs him, resulting in him accidentally running over and killing the Easter Bunny while out buying Easter candy. Jerry starts mutating into another Easter Bunny, so Rick and Morty go to seek how to reverse the transformation. They discover that the Easter Bunny is actually an alien rabbit creature that produces pheromones that cause everyone around it to start uncontrollably having sex, leading to planetary destruction through overpopulation. As they attempt to steal an Easter Bunny Egg to reverse Jerry's mutation, they are pursued by Space Christians led by Reinhard Kincaid that abstain from sex and wish to rid the universe of the rabbits. Meanwhile, Jerry transforms into a rampaging rabbit monster and begins forcing everyone in the world to have sex. After a confrontation results in every member of the family briefly turning into an Easter Bunny, Reinhard arrives and extracts the rabbit's particles into the Easter Egg and leaves with it. After Jerry and the family are returned to normal, they decide they're better off not celebrating any more holidays and go out to ruin every other holiday of the year for everyone else. Post-credits scene: Reinhard returns to his wife with the Easter egg and states he wishes to make love to her, having gotten over his disgust for sex, only to be rejected.
76	5	"Cryo Mort a Rickver"	Fill Marc Sagadraca	Nick Rutherford	June 22, 2025	N/A
Rick attempts to rob an alien sleeper ship with a vault full of treasure but Morty stops him, causing the ship to wake all the passengers from their cryosleep. Determined to rob the vault, Rick disguises himself and Morty as two aliens who died in cryosleep. Rick is assumed as Jimmy, a child whose wealthy "Takey" parents believe he's grown up rapidly, and is cared for by them, while Morty is assumed as a janitor named Chachaco and is forced to live with the working class "Makeys". Morty inspires the Makeys to rip out their compliance chips and stage a rebellion against the Takeys. During the attack, Morty forces the vault open, but find the vault empty. Everyone learns that the real Jimmy and Chachaco are alive and robbed the vault themselves. Everyone on the ship goes after Jimmy and Chachaco to claim the money for themselves. After a chaotic chase with many casualties, Rick and Morty catch up to Jimmy and eject the treasures and Chachaco out of an airlock. Afterwards, Rick implants all the surviving aliens with compliance chips before placing them into cryosleep. Post-credits scene: A zoologist and a monkey he befriended during the chase remained at the casino, where the monkey wins big in poker.
77	6	"The Curicksous Case of Bethjamin Button"	Eugene Huang	Heather Anne Campbell & Jess Lacher	June 29, 2025	N/A
When Beth and Space Beth grow dissatisfied with their lives, Space Beth uses an aging machine to turn them both into 10-year-old girls. As kids, the two Beths prove to be disturbingly psychotic and violent, terrorizing their neighbor Gene before turning on each other. Meanwhile Rick takes Morty, Summer and Jerry to “Earth World,” an alien theme park modeled after Earth. He’s disappointed to find it safer and higher quality than he remembers. Rick discovers the park’s creator Dr. Dogballs chained up, frees him and together they revisit the park’s original, more dangerous version. But when Rick intercepts a 911 call from Gene he abandons the park to deal with the Beths. In Rick’s absence Dr. Dogballs unleashes an army of mutated mascots on Earth World, forcing Summer, Morty and Jerry to fight their way out. Back home the Beths trap Rick in the aging machine, turning him into a frail old man. After roughing him up they reconcile with him and with each other once Rick admits that his original Beth is dead. The Beths return to their adult lives with a new sense of satisfaction. Post-credits scene: Rick's cell phone plays voicemails of multiple intercepted calls to 911 from Gene.
78	7	"Ricker than Fiction"	Douglas Einar Olsen	Rob Schrab	July 6, 2025	N/A
Rick, Morty, and Jerry are at home watching the latest installment of the film series "Maximum Velocitree", to which Rick and Morty both express disappointment and anger in the movie. In an attempt to fix the franchise, Rick & Morty steal the script to the next installment from James Gunn. Rick introduces his invention, the Movie-Lizer, which automatically creates a movie if given a script. After giving the machine the stolen script, Rick makes a bunch of slapdash edits, resulting in Rick and Morty being sucked into the film. They're forced to find an ending to the movie to escape. Morty ends up having to take on the antagonist role, while Rick has to break comic relief character Tannenbaum out of jail in order to restore the ending. Eventually, the two end up angering both the heroes and villains of the movie and need Jerry's help to escape. Jerry is able to bring Rick and Morty to a superweapon after a chase sequence. Rick pulls himself and Morty into the beam of the superweapon, ending the movie and freeing them back into the real world. Post-credits scene: Jerry goes into the Movie-Lizer to create Space Jam 7 before Summer unknowingly inserts her Velociraptor porn into the machine.
79	8	"Nomortland"	Fill Marc Sagadraca	Albro Lundy & James Siciliano	July 13, 2025	N/A
The Smith family go about their morning while a new Jerry, called Mooch, eats cereal. The original Jerry walks in and demands to know why there's a second Jerry. Mooch reveals himself to be a traveller of The Road, a series of paths to other dimensions through residual wormholes created by some of Rick's reality-bending tech. Mooch takes Jerry along for an adventure through an assortment of wacky dimensions. They end up missing their connection back to the "Parmesan" dimension and have to head to Grand Central, a dimension with many paths to other dimensions. Jerry ends up angering Boss Jerry, getting both Jerry and Mooch ejected and blacklisted from using The Road. They end up in Mooch Jerry's original universe, where Beth has married Paul Fleischman after Mooch disappeared years ago. They go to the Smith house to enlist Rick's help while Mooch reconciles with his family. Returning to Grand Central, they get chased by goons across dimensions and end up killing Boss Jerry before making their way back to the "Parmesan" dimension. Jerry's family is relieved he is safe upon finding him. Post-credits scene: Beth walks in on Rick and Jerry watching television naked and berates them.
80	9	"Morty Daddy"	Eugene Huang	Beth Stelling	July 20, 2025	N/A
Morty gets called by his son, Morty Jr. Rick and Summer get paged for a table at a "pre-cog" restaurant, which predicts what food you want before you arrive. Morty goes to meet Junior at the hospital, who expresses relief at seeing his father, and asks to reconcile with his mother. At the restaurant, Rick gets a dish of Morlackian fawn, while Summer gets avocado toast, to which she expresses disappointment. She berates the pre-cogs that decide what food you will want, and eventually is forced to hide from the cops in a safehouse with them and Rick. Summer eventually kidnaps the pre-cogs and forces them to admit they gave her the wrong food in their plan to leave the restaurant and open a food truck. Morty takes Junior to his mother's resting place, Rick's garbage portal, where they get chased by Salvatron into Garbtopia, a safe haven from Salvatron's reign. Morty and Junior lead a revolt against Salvatron and knock down the guard tower with the help of Garbtopia denizens. Afterwards, Junior decides to stay in Garbtopia as Rick puts the pre-cogs' food truck into the garbage portal. Post-credits scene: The pre-cogs run their food truck in Garbtopia.
81	10	"Hot Rick"	Brian Kaufman	Albro Lundy & James Siciliano	July 27, 2025	N/A
Rick is in bed with Bug Anne, a high ranking member of a bug-based society. She invites Rick to an event with her family but he is reluctant because of his memories of Diane. Later, Rick finds that Memory Rick has been transferred to Jerry's mind. Rick moves Memory Rick from Jerry's brain into a storage device, and also moves his memory of Diane from his own brain into a separate storage device. Memory Rick builds a device that transfers him to Beth's mind when she touches the memory storage. Memory Rick uses Beth's memories to persuade her to help Memory Rick transfer Memory Diane to Beth's mind. Beth's memories of herself rebel and drive her insane, leading her to break Space Beth's neck. Rick offends Bug Anne's family at the event and must fight her ex-boyfriend, but portals home and revives Space Beth. Beth gets in a car and drives off a cliff before Rick and Space Beth save Beth and subdue her. Later, Rick is seen releasing Memory Rick and Memory Diane to live together in a memory storage device he sends into space. Post-credits scene: Mr. Poopybutthole addresses the viewers while inside a containment unit, while another dimension's Mrs. Poopybutthole explains to researchers that he seems to have replaced her own dimension's Poopybutthole and be able to talk to beyond the fourth wall.

== Production ==
=== Development ===
The season is a part of a long-term deal between show creators Justin Roiland and Dan Harmon and Adult Swim, confirming 70 new episodes would be released over an unspecified number of seasons. Forty of those episodes were aired as part of season four, season five, season six, and season seven, leaving thirty episodes remaining with season eight, season nine and season ten. In October 2024, the show was renewed for two more seasons up until season 12 with 20 more episodes.

== Release ==
The eighth season premiered on May 25, 2025.

== Reception ==
On the review aggregator Rotten Tomatoes, season 8 has a 93% score based on 14 reviews. The site's critics consensus reads: "Delivering clever fun rather than trying to reinvent the wheel yet again, Rick & Morty's eighth season might not reach previous peaks but proves consistently hilarious."
