= Recurring features in Mad =

Mad is known for many regular and semi-regular recurring features in its pages.

== Fold-ins ==
Every issue but two of Mad from 1964 to the present has featured a Fold-in, written and drawn by artist Al Jaffee until he retired in 2020 and Johnny Sampson thereafter. They usually appear on the inside back cover, though one issue featured a Fold-in front cover and the year-end "Mad 20" issues move the feature to an interior page. In each Fold-in a question is asked, often of a topical nature. The subject is illustrated by a picture taking up the bulk of the page, with a block of text underneath. When the page is folded inward, the inner and outer fourths of the picture combine to reveal an alternate answer in both picture and words. Jaffee's precise layouts sometimes include false visual cues designed to trick the reader's eye towards an incorrect solution.

== "The Lighter Side of..." ==
From 1961 to 2002, Dave Berg produced "The Lighter Side of...", which often satirized the suburban lifestyle, capitalism and the generation gap. Subjects commonly lampooned include medicine, office life, parties, marriage, psychiatry, shopping, school and other everyday activities. Although this feature eventually became notorious for its corny gags and garishly outdated fashion choices, the Mad editors reported that it was the magazine's most popular feature. "The Lighter Side" was more pointed in its early years, providing the sort of Americana-based humor that standups such as Shelley Berman and Alan King performed successfully onstage. The feature was retired with Berg's death.

Four months after the last Berg artwork was published, his final set of gags, which Berg had written but not penciled, appeared as a tribute. These last "Lighter Side" strips were divided among 18 of the magazine's regular artists, including Jack Davis' last original work for Mad. In 2007, an occasional feature called "The Darker Side of the Lighter Side" debuted. These consist of reprinted Berg strips, with rewritten word balloons that change the gags to references about disease, sex offenders, corpse disposal and other unsavory, un-Berg-like topics.

== "Spy vs. Spy" ==
Antonio Prohías's wordless "Spy vs. Spy," the never-ending battle between the iconic Black Spy and White Spy, ended up outlasting the Cold War that inspired it. Except for the respective black/white color of their clothing, the two spies were identical in appearance and intent. The strip was a silent parable about the futility of mutually-assured destruction, with various elaborate traps designed in Prohías' thick line. Typically, the trap would boomerang back on whichever spy had concocted it. There was no pattern or order dictating which spy would be defeated in a particular episode. A female "Grey Spy" frequently appeared from 1962 through 1965, followed by a 40-year hiatus. After that she made occasional appearances from 2005 to 2020. Unlike her two adversaries, she always prevailed. Although Prohías retired from doing the strip in the late 1980s, "Spy vs. Spy" continued in a series of different hands until 1997, when Peter Kuper took over as the full-time writer-artist. However, the original Morse Code byline "by Prohias" remains in each strip's title.

== Don Martin gags ==
Don Martin, billed as "Mad's Maddest Artist", drew gag cartoons, generally one page but sometimes longer, featuring lumpen characters with apparently hinged feet. Martin's absurd sight gags were frequently punctuated by an array of onomatopoeic sound effects such as "GLORK" or "PATWANG-FWEEE", coined by Martin himself (or by frequent ghost writer Don Edwing). Martin's wild physical comedy would eventually make him the signature artist of the magazine.

When Martin first joined Mad, he employed a nervous, scratchy art style, but this developed into a rounder, more cartoony look. Many of his cartoons used similar expositional titles (e.g., "One Exceedingly Fine Day at the Beach," "On the Elevator," "The Pickpocket"). On occasion these titles became increasingly elaborate (e.g., "One Night in the Acme Ritz Central Arms Waldorf Plaza Statler Hilton Grand Hotel", "One Hot Sunny Afternoon in the Middle of the Ocean", or "One Fine Day at the Corner of South Finster Boulevard and Fonebone Street").

Martin's 31-year association with Mad ended in some rancor over the ownership of his original artwork. Not long after leaving Mad, Martin ended up working at Mad's competitor Cracked, which, unlike Mad, allowed creators to keep their pages. In 1994, Martin left Cracked and published a handful of issues of his own self-titled publication.

== "A Mad Look at..." and "Drawn-Out Dramas" ==
Sergio Aragonés has written and drawn his "A Mad Look At..." feature since his debut in Mad #76 (January 1963), which began to be sold on November 13, 1962. Each is a series of gag strips with a common theme. Aragonés' Mad cartooning is notable for almost never using word balloons; when they occur at all, they will most often feature a drawing of whatever is being discussed. Aragonés will periodically bend this rule for a store window sign, a stray "Gesundheit", or some other dialogue vital to the punchline.

Aragonés also provides the "Mad Marginals" or "Drawn-out Dramas", which are small gag images that appear throughout the magazine in its corners, margins or the narrow spaces between panels. Aragonés also debuted the feature in Mad #76, and it has appeared in every issue of the magazine since, except for Mad #111. According to Aragonés, his work for that issue was lost in the mail.

== Movie and TV show parodies ==
A typical issue will include at least one full parody of a popular movie or television show. The titles are changed to create a play on words; for instance, The Addams Family became The Adnauseum Family. The character names are generally switched in the same fashion.

These articles run for several pages, and are presented as a sequential storyline with caricatures and word balloons. The opening page or two-page splash usually consists of the cast of the show introducing themselves directly to the reader. In some parodies, the writers sometimes attempt to circumvent this convention by presenting the characters without such direct exposition. Many parodies end with the abrupt deus ex machina appearance of outside characters or pop culture figures who are thematically tied into the nature to the movie or TV series being parodied, or who comment satirically on the theme. For example, Dr. Phil arrives to counsel the psychologically damaged Desperate Housewives; in another spoof, the former cast of Sex and the City are hired as the new hookers for another HBO series, Deadwood.

The parodies frequently make comedic use of the fourth wall, breaking character, and meta-references. Within an ostensibly self-contained storyline, the characters may refer to the technical aspects of filmmaking, the publicity, hype or box office surrounding their project, their own past roles or real-life circumstances, and critical analysis of clichés. In the final panel of "The $ound of Money", the magazine's 1966 parody of The Sound of Music, Julie Andrews sings a parody of the song "Climb Ev'ry Mountain". The rewritten lyrics reference both the producers' decision to create scarcity and maximize box office profits by running the film in just one theater per city at inflated ticket prices ("Charge high admissions; / Let people wait; / That will make them think they're / Seeing something great!"), as well as Warner Brothers' decision to replace Andrews with Audrey Hepburn in its movie adaptation of My Fair Lady. Andrews had been a great success as Eliza Doolittle in the original Broadway production, but she was passed over for the film role. Despite the high-profile snub, Andrews made an Oscar-winning debut in Mary Poppins – released four months before My Fair Lady – and solidifying her big screen success with The Sound of Music. Concluding the Mad parody, Andrews gleefully sings:

"With all these profits,
Things will be fine!
When we top "Fair Lady",
Ven-geance... will... be... mine!"

Several show business stars have been quoted to the effect that the moment when they knew they had finally "made it" was when they saw themselves thus depicted in the pages of Mad. Many celebrities parodied by the magazine have posed for photographs which were printed in Mad's letters column, generally holding the copy of the magazine they appeared in, and frequently, reacting in some comical way. After the magazine depicted the main cast of L.A. Law on a 1987 cover, the actors responded with a photo in which the actors mimicked their caricatured poses and placement, with series creator Steven Bochco blacking out a tooth and taking the place of Alfred E. Neuman.

Guns N' Roses guitarist Slash told Mojo, "The magazine cover that has meant the most to me was probably when I appeared in Mad Magazine, as a caricature of Alfred E. Neuman (#330, 1994). That was when I felt that I'd arrived." Film critic Roger Ebert said that being parodied by Mad was "the ultimate honor." In an appearance on The Tonight Show, Michael J. Fox told Johnny Carson that he knew he had made it in show business "when Mort Drucker drew my head." Howard Stern has often talked about what the magazine meant to him, as in January 2009 when he said, "My greatest career highlight was being on the cover of Mad Magazine." He revisited the topic in October 2013, saying, "It really was the pinnacle of success for me, that I could be on the cover of MAD Magazine, with Alfred E. Neuman plunging my head into a toilet bowl. I was just so thrilled and happy... I couldn't believe it."

== Monroe ==
Monroe was an ongoing storyline about an angst-filled teenaged loser. It depicted the title character's travails in school, his dysfunctional home and his relentless troubles elsewhere. Written by Anthony Barbieri, it was illustrated by Bill Wray from 1997 to 2006. The previously black-and-white feature was colorized in 2005, and went on hiatus for much of 2006. When it returned, it was drawn by Tom Fowler with Barbieri remaining the writer. It last appeared in January 2010.

== Irregular recurring features ==
Several Mad premises have been successful enough to warrant additional installments, though not with the regularity of the above. These include:

- The Mad Academy Awards for ____ – typically written by Stan Hart, these would mimic the Oscar telecast by showing nominated "performance clips" in non-film areas of life (such as parenting or small business ownership).
- Advertising parodies – too numerous to catalog, though many have been written by Dick DeBartolo; these have ranged from TV ad spoofs to national print campaigns to home marketing and have long provided one of the most durable sources of the magazine's humor. A separate paperback of original material titled Madvertising was published in 1972, and an extensive reprint collection appeared with the same title in 2005.
- Alfred's Poor Almanac – written by Frank Jacobs over several issues in 1962 and 1974, this text-heavy page featured quick one-liners, puns, faux anniversaries and other arcana, supposedly matched to each day of that month.
- Badly-Needed Warning Labels for Rock Albums – written by Desmond Devlin, this series of articles mocked both the ongoing Parental Advisory labelling controversy, as well as the musicians of the day, with specifically written warning labels for particular recordings.
- Behind the Scenes at ____ – written and illustrated by various, these frequently take a bird's eye view of a scene, such as a television studio or office. Various vignettes and conversations play out simultaneously, showing the reader how the participants "really" think and behave.
- Believe It or Nuts! – written and illustrated by various (though most often drawn by Wally Wood or Bob Clarke), this parody of the print version of Ripley's Believe It or Not! depicted alleged marvels and mundanities of the world. In the late 1950s, Mad also published regular installments of "Kovacs' Strangely Believe It!", another Ripley's parody written by Ernie Kovacs.
- Celebrity Cause-of-Death Betting Odds – written by Mike Snider, this long-running feature listed and "ranked" possible methods of future death for one well-known person at a time. It usually contained a tombstone with a caricature of the celebrity (usually drawn by Hermann Mejia). A shorter version later ran in the "Fundalini" section, initially using photo cutouts of the celebrities' faces in lieu of the tombstones, before being phased out and replaced with illustrations by Rick Tulka, depicting one of the possible causes of death.
- Celebrity Wallets – usually written by Arnie Kogen, this was a series of peeks at the notes, photographs and other memorabilia being carried around in the pockets of the famous.
- Cents-less Coupons – written by Scott Maiko, these imitate the giveaway coupon packets found in Sunday newspapers but promote ludicrous products such as "Inbred Valley Imitation Squirrel Meat".
- Chilling Thoughts – written by Desmond Devlin and illustrated by Rick Tulka or Evan Dorkin, these feature observations or predictions about both the culture and everyday life that have supposedly dire implications.
- A Day in the Life of... – written by Scott Maiko, these articles depict the purported hour-by-hour activities of a particular celebrity, such as George Lucas, Dick Cheney, Adam Sandler, or Dane Cook.
- Mad Deconstructs Talk Shows – written by Desmond Devlin, these take on one show at a time and purport to reveal the minute-by-minute format breakdown of America's not too spontaneous chat programs.
- Do-It-Yourself Newspaper Story – written by Frank Jacobs, these are short text news items containing a number of blank spaces. Each space has a corresponding list of numbered fill-in-the-blank options, which grow increasingly absurd. The premise is that with appropriate mixing and matching, the article can be read in a vast number of permutations. The same format has also been applied by Jacobs to other areas as poetry, press releases, or speechmaking.
- Duke Bissell's Tales of Undisputed Interest – written and illustrated by P.C. Vey, these absurdist one-page strips presented a series of non sequiturs and bizarre references in the guise of a linear storyline.
- 15 Minutes of Fame – written by Frank Jacobs, it consists of short poems about lesser celebrities and news figures.
- The 50 Worst Things About ____ – written and illustrated by various, this is an annual article format which has thus far dealt with large catch-all topics such as "TV," "comedy," "cartoons", "food" or "sports."
- The Mad Guide to Man Boobs – written by Ryan Pagelow and illustrated by Drew Friedman, these one-page articles depict an assortment of topless men whose breasts are uniquely misshapen or unsightly, with an official descriptive name given to each configuration, such as "Stalacteats" or "Belt Sniffers."
- The Mad Hate File – written and illustrated by Al Jaffee, these contained a series of observational one-liners about common irritations.
- Hawks & Doves – written and illustrated by Al Jaffee during the Vietnam War era, this was a series of cartoons in which the autocratic Major Hawks is exasperated by the rebellious Private Doves, who keeps finding unexpected ways to create the peace symbol on his military base.
- Horrifying Clichés – illustrated by Paul Coker Jr. and often written by Phil Hahn, these articles visually depicted florid turns of phraseology such as "tripping the light fantastic", "racking one's thoughts" or "laboring under a misconception"; the verbs are taken literally, and all the nouns are characterized as bizarre horned, scaled or otherwise unusual creatures; Mad also published a separate paperback of these.
- The Mad Library of Extremely Thin Books – written by Frank Jacobs, these two-page articles were laid out to look like a bookshelf in which only the spines of the books were visible. The various titles would suggest books that could not possibly contain much content, such as "Making It On Your Own" by Nancy Sinatra, "Wonderful Things That a Nickel Will Still Buy", "Out-Spoken Feminists in the Arab World", or "Prominent Black Yachtsmen".
- Mad's ____ of the Year – written and illustrated by various, these four-to-six-page articles would enact an interview with a fictional representative of a particular practice or element of society (i.e. "MAD's Summer Camp Owner of the Year"; "MAD's Movie Producer of the Year").
- Meanwhile... – by Ian Boothby and Pia Guerra, two pages of four one panel gag strips.
- Melvin and Jenkins' Guide to _____ – written by Desmond Devlin and illustrated by Kevin Pope, these "guides," a parody of Highlights magazine's regular feature Goofus and Gallant, present the behavioral or attitudinal "do's and don'ts" on a variety of topics, as demonstrated by the titular pair (Jenkins doing the proper thing, while Melvin does not). An abbreviated version runs in the "Fundalini" section.
- Movie Outtakes – these are screen captures of upcoming films (generally taken from the movie trailer), given new word balloons; MAD typically times these pieces to coincide with the movie's general release, either in advance of the full parody or in lieu of it.
- The Mad Nasty File – typically written by Tom Koch and illustrated by Harry North or Gerry Gersten, these insult articles caricatured a variety of public figures and proceeded to abuse them verbally.
- Obituaries for ____ Characters – generally written by Frank Jacobs, these alleged newspaper clippings detail the appropriate demises for fictional characters from a genre such as comic strips, advertising, or television.
- People Watcher's Guide to ____ – often written by Mike Snider and illustrated by Tom Bunk, these articles used a scenario such as "the mall" or "a cemetery" to mock specific observed behaviors.
- Planet Tad!!!!! – written by Tim Carvell and illustrated by Brian Durniak, this purports to be the LiveJournal-like webpage of teenaged loser Tad's blog, which inadvertently reveals his various personal traumas and general idiocy.
- Pop-Off Videos – written by Desmond Devlin and illustrated with music video screen captures, these one-page articles mimicked the VH1 series "Pop-Up Video," which enhanced music videos with small bits of information. Mad also published a separate standalone special issue of these.
- The Mad _____ Primer – written and illustrated by various, Mad Primers mimicked the writing style of Dick and Jane and dealt with a wide variety of subjects from bigotry to hockey to religion; Mad also published a Cradle to Grave Primer as a separate paperback, showing the complete misery-filled life of one man.
- ____ Revisited – "conceived" by Max Brandel according to his credit, these photographic pieces would take a long-established piece of text, such as the Preamble to the U.S. Constitution, or the Ten Commandments, and systematically illustrate the text with ironically-chosen photo images.
- Scenes We'd Like to See – written and illustrated by various, these were generally one-page vignettes which inverted the common conventions of moviemaking, advertising, or the culture at large, ending with a clichéd character in a clichéd setting, acting cowardly or saying something atypically honest.
- Six Degrees of Separation Between Anyone and Anything – written by Mike Snider and illustrated by Rick Tulka, this feature exploited the Kevin Bacon-based game of links to humorously connect various items or people in thematic or painstakingly phrased ways rather than proximity.
- Snappy Answers to Stupid Questions – written and illustrated by Al Jaffee, this long-running series reproduces unnecessary questions (i.e., "Is that an octopus?" "Are you a jogger?") and supplies three sarcastic responses for each, along with a blank box for the reader to supply their own snappy answer. A mini-version of this feature occasionally appears in the magazine's "Fundalini" section, consisting of just one question. Mad has also published several separate, standalone paperbacks of these.
- Seven Periods Closer to Death – written and illustrated by Ted Rall, this one-page strip takes a satirical look at life in high school.
- What Is A ____? – written by Tom Koch, these text-heavy articles would describe the characteristics of a personality type, such as an introvert, a "big man on campus", or a party-pooper.
- When ____ Go Bad – written and illustrated by John Caldwell, each article depicts the outrageous behavior allegedly found within the worst element of a certain culture or profession (i.e. "When Nuns Go Bad"; "When Clowns Go Bad"; "When The Morbidly Obese Go Bad"; "When Minions Go Really, Really Bad").
- The Year in Film – written by Desmond Devlin, these ironically juxtaposed movie titles of the past calendar year with photographs of topical news events or celebrities.
- You Know You're Really ___ When... – written and illustrated by various, these took a common condition ("You're Really Overweight When...") and presented several one-liners on the theme.

Besides the above, Mad has returned to certain themes and areas again and again, such as fullblown imaginary magazines, greeting cards, nursery rhymes, Christmas carols, song parodies and other poetry (including several versions of "Casey at the Bat"), comic strip takeoffs and others.

== Table of Contents ==
The first page of each issue lists all the articles to follow, including their "Department" headings, which are plays on words. For example, a parody of a pizza chain's menu appeared under "The Passion of the Crust Department", while an article entitled "William Shakespeare, Sports Commentator" was part of "The Play-By-Play's the Thing Department". Long-running features had equally long-running headers: Spy vs. Spy is filed under the "Joke and Dagger Department", Dave Berg's "Lighter Side of..." always ran within the "Berg's Eye View Department", and many of Frank Jacobs' articles come under the "Frank on a Roll Department". Don Martin's crazy cartoons were simply labelled "Don Martin Department", with further fanfare presumably being unnecessary. Dick DeBartolo's articles occasionally are headed under the "Dick DePartment", while some of Duck Edwing's articles were labeled as the "Tales from the Duck Side" Dept. Most of the magazine's other recurring features have had their own continuing "Department".

Each Table of Contents cites one article that does not actually exist. Examples of these imaginary listings have included "Santa Claus, Porn Star"; "What if Cap'n Crunch Was Brought Before a Military Tribunal?"; "If Bobby Knight Coached the Special Olympics"; "Only the Assistant Undersecretary of Transportation Would Possibly Believe..."; "What if Daffy and Donald Duck Went To Prison?"; and "Snappy Answers to Stupid Questions During the Bombing of Belgrade". In one instance, the fake title listed, "If Chickens Could Time Travel", showed up as a genuine article in the next issue.

Each Table of Contents also includes a quote or aphorism attributed to Alfred E. Neuman. With a handful of exceptions, this is the only time the character ever "speaks".

== Letters and Tomatoes Dept. ==
An esoteric version of the standard "Letters to the Editors", this section of the magazine includes correspondence from readers, reader drawings or craft projects, celebrity photos, references to Mad in other media, and so forth. In recent years, all letters are typically answered in a snide and insulting manner, and always include a pun or twist on the sender's name.

The first "Letters" section (then called "Mad Mumblings") appeared in MAD #3 (January–February 1953). The first letter printed came from a Marine Corps corporal named Eugene F. Shanlin, who said he "had never heard people laugh out loud at a comic magazine before!" (Shanlin later became an officer with the NYPD and died in 2000.)

There have been a few recurring sub-departments, including the "Make a Dumb Wish Foundation" which promised to make readers' stupid requests come true (a parody of the Make a Wish Foundation); "Antiques Freakshow with Hans Brickface", in which photographs of readers' bizarre household items were appraised by the slightly psychotic Hans; absurd one-sentence observations called "MAD Mumblings", which were typically non sequiturs posted online by the readers; and celebrity "Two-Question Interviews" which were essentially over before they began, thus revealing nothing.

The magazine solicits reader photos of famous people posing with a copy of Mad. Once a year, Mad publishes "The Nifty Fifty", listing 50 famous people they hope to see in upcoming "Celebrity Snaps". A reader who successfully gets one of the fifty to pose in a photo gets a free three-year subscription (provided that the celebrity is touching the issue). Some celebrities send in photos of themselves, typically in response to the magazine having targeted them in a previous issue. The magazine was delighted to publish a photo of Dan Quayle unwittingly holding the "PROOFREADER WANTED" cover of Mad #355, on which the magazine's logo appeared as MAAD. During a photo op in 1992, the then-Vice President had incorrectly "corrected" an elementary school student on the way Quayle thought the word "potato" should be spelled.

== The Fundalini Pages ==
Beginning with its February 2004 edition, Mad has led off its issues with this catch-all section of various bits, which are far shorter or smaller than normal Mad articles. They often appear as many as three to six per page. Some of these pieces are produced in-house; others are the work of freelancers. All contributors for each month were credited en masse, as "Friends of Fundalini". For this reason, it is not always apparent which contributor is responsible for which item, particularly the writers. Beginning with issue number 500 (June 2009), writers and artists (except editorial staff members) have been given credit for individual contributions. Most Fundalini features are one-shot gags that never appear again, some have appeared multiple times, and a few have become regular features. Among the recurring elements in the Fundalini section are:

=== Created for Fundalini ===
- Bitterman, a short comic strip by Garth Gerhart about a hateful slacker;
- Classified ads; these frequently deal in absurdity and non sequiturs;
- The Cover We Didn't Use, purporting to be the "second choice" for that issue's front cover;
- The Fast 5, a Top 5 list similar to David Letterman's Top 10 lists;
- Foto News, in which topical photographs are given word balloons (similar to fumetti, though without that genre's narrative storyline aspect);
- Gag panels by cartoonists such as Tom Cheney ("Pull My Cheney!"), or P.C. Vey ("Vey to Go!", later called Oy Vey!).
- The Godfrey Report, a small 3x 3 grid showing three classes of objects and their current cultural status, which is arbitrarily rated as "In", "Five Minutes Ago", or "Out". (e.g. Stoolies: In, Squealers: Five Minutes Ago, Turncoats: Out);
- Graphic Novel Review, written by Desmond Devlin, which analyzes fictional comic collections and graphic novels such as The Anally Complete Peanuts or Tintin in Fallujah;
- The Kitchen Sink, a lengthy barrage of spoof titles for topics such as "Reality Shows Currently Under Development" or "Proposed Star Wars Sequel Titles";
- Monkeys Are Always Funny, by Evan Dorkin, showing famous news photographs with the image of a monkey Photoshopped in (e.g. the raid on Elian Gonzalez's closet, or the Hindenburg explosion);
- The NFL's Ref Report, written by Kiernan P. Schmitt, which illustrates a topic by using generic drawings of a referee's hand signals;
- The Puzzle Nook, a multiple choice fill-in-the-blank phrase;
- Saddam Sez, which reused the same photograph of Saddam Hussein speaking at his 2006 trial. A word balloon was added, making a random reference having nothing to do with Hussein or Iraq. The March 2007 issue of Mad contained a statement that "Due to circumstances beyond our control" the Saddam Sez feature would be put on "indefinite hiatus". Fidel Castro later replaced Saddam with "Castro Comments";

A Wikipedia parody has appeared twice, first called "Wonkypedia", and then "Wakipedia". Both entries featured a convoluted assortment of unrelated facts, in the style of an inaccurate or vandalized Wikipedia page (e.g. the "article" on Pearl Harbor discussed Mao Tse-Tung's surprise attack and how it led to the bombing of Chernobyl). Wonkypedia is now an actual website.

Truncated versions of two pre-existing features, *Celebrity Cause of Death Betting Odds" and *Melvin and Jenkins' Guide to..." have been moved to Fundalini.

== The Strip Club ==
An assortment of short gag comic strips drawn by various artists, it has appeared roughly every other month since its debut in the July 2005 issue. It typically runs three pages, and is a combination of one-shot gags and recurring features. Among the repeated strip characters are an omnipotent superhero called Fantabulaman; a hero robot named Santon; Rob, the Evil Backstabbing Robot Temp; Father O'Flannity, a priest who conducts celebrity interviews in a hot tub; Trigger McBride, a horse cop; the unnamed protagonists who use "The Machine that Travels Through Time"; Jeff, a man whose roommate is oblivious to the fact that he is a serial killer despite obvious evidence; and Patience Man, a superhero who takes too long to stop crimes.

== Go Fetch! ==
Blurring the line between advertising and content was Go Fetch!, a 2005-06 list of newly released media products such as videogames, DVD releases, music albums and books. Each product listing had The Hype and The Snipe, in which its good and bad qualities were expounded. Each Go Fetch! also promoted "the Must Have", an idiosyncratic (but real) product which no Mad reader should be without, such as cold galvanizing spray, or a pneumatic jackhammer. Go Fetch! was an odd cross between the wise-ass Mad mentality and the sort of product ratings generally associated with Rolling Stone. It was an overtly commercial feature, with some one-liners thrown in with the apparent hope of making it more palatable. As such, Go Fetch! was heavily criticized by many of the magazine's loyal readers as a betrayal of the magazine's original satiric mission. In its year of existence, Go Fetch! appeared in eight of 12 issues, but the feature has been defunct since June 2006.

== "The Mad 20" ==
Since 1998, in every January issue, Mad has commemorated the "20 Dumbest People, Events and Things" of the year. These emphasize the visual motif above all else, parodying such things as movie posters, famous paintings, or magazine covers, though one or two text-heavier takeoffs are usually sprinkled into each year's assortment. The feature is reminiscent of the old Spy Magazine's "Spy 100" list, which purported to catalogue "Our Annual Census of the 100 Most Annoying, Alarming, and Appalling People, Places and Things".

Though the "20 Dumbest People, Events and Things" are numbered 1-20, the "rankings" appear to be essentially random. The "20th dumbest" slot of 2001 was awarded to Mad itself for its "slide down the slippery slope of greedy commercialism" in finally permitting advertising in its pages.

Keeping in mind the indiscriminate positioning, these were the "#1" selections for the various years:

- 1998: "Starr Wars", a movie poster parody of the partisan Kenneth Starr investigation, depicting Starr as Darth Vader, and Bill Clinton holding a cigar instead of a light saber;
- 1999: "Y2K Panic", a chaotic cartoon showing a crashing airplane displacing the Times Square New Year's Ball, sending it careening into a terror-stricken crowd;
- 2000: A rewritten Presidential oath of office. The issue went to press one week after the disputed 2000 election; the editors had thought they would be able to plug in the winner, but were obliged to publish two versions of the image, one with Al Gore being sworn in, the other depicting George W. Bush;
- 2001: "A.I. Asinine Ideology", a movie poster parody of the Steven Spielberg film A.I. highlighting Jerry Falwell's placing blame on the 9/11 attacks on gays, feminists, abortion care providers and the ACLU;
- 2002: "Martha Stewart Lying", a magazine spoof of Martha Stewart's insider trading scandal;
- 2003: "Term Eliminator", a movie poster parody of the third Terminator film mocking Arnold Schwarzenegger's victory in the California recall election;
- 2004: "Donny Rumsfeld and the Prisoners of Abu Ghraib", a book cover in the style of the third Harry Potter jacket, Harry Potter and the Prisoner of Azkaban;
- 2005: "Where's W?", a book parody in the style of the Where's Waldo? series. The cover shows a tableau of the crowded, flooded streets of New Orleans in the aftermath of Hurricane Katrina, with George W. Bush completely impossible to find;
- 2006: "The Iraqi Quagmire Chess Set", in the style of a Franklin Mint collectable. Literal chess pieces were sculpted and photographed, depicting such figures as Dick Cheney, Joseph Lieberman, Abu-Musab al-Zarqawi and Muqtada al-Sadr;
- 2007: "Michael & Me", A parody of the book Marley and Me and ostensibly written from the perspective of one of Michael Vick's illegal fighting pit bulls. The book cover depicts Vick strangling a dog;
- 2008: "Clueless", a parody of the board game Clue featuring losing vice presidential candidate Sarah Palin. It included rules of play which mimicked Palin's rhetoric and speaking style. The rooms, weapons, characters were also changed to reflect her persona and associations.
- 2009: "The Canonization of Michael Jackson", a religious icon which poked fun at media, fans and other hangers-on who spent the weeks following Jackson's death ignoring or whitewashing the child molestation accusations, his eccentric habits and his penchant for self-glorification. (Jackson's personal physician, who is widely blamed for causing the singer's death by overdose, was given his own entry at #20: a parody of Jackson's "Thriller" album, renamed "Killer");
- 2010: "Creators of the Black Lagoon", a poster parody of the 1954 monster movie satirizing the malfeasance before and after the BP oil spill in the Gulf of Mexico.
- 2011: "The Walking Debt", a parody of the AMC series The Walking Dead mocking the partisan battle over the previously perfunctory adjustment to the U.S. debt ceiling. President Obama, Nancy Pelosi, Harry Reid, John Boehner, Eric Cantor and Mitch McConnell are among the politicians shown as shuffling, mindless zombies.
- 2012: "Paint Misbehavin' ", a parody of the 1960 Norman Rockwell painting "Triple Self-Portrait" which was changed to satirize Cecilia Gimenez's botched "restoration" of the religious Ecce Homo fresco in Borja, Zaragoza.
- 2013: "National Buffoons' Abysmal House", a parody of the movie poster for the 1978 comedy film Animal House, mocking John Boehner and the Republican Party-led House of Representatives for triggering the government shutdown.
- 2014: "GoodellFellas", a parody of the movie poster for the 1990 gangster film Goodfellas, mocking NFL Commissioner Roger Goodell for the league's lack of punishment against Ray Rice for beating his wife in an elevator, and Adrian Peterson's abuse of his son with a tree branch.
- 2015: "The Great Gasbag", a parody of the movie poster for the 2013 film The Great Gatsby, mocking Donald Trump's abusive "verbal diarrhea" towards Jeb Bush, Megyn Kelly and others during his bombastic campaign for the Republican Presidential nomination. Mad had previously used the title "The Great Gasbag" for its parody of the 1974 Robert Redford-Mia Farrow film adaptation.
- 2016: "The Toxic Contender", a parody of the movie poster for the 1984 film The Toxic Avenger, mocking Donald Trump's "name-calling", "fact-free", "soul-crushingly noxious" campaign. It was the first of four Trump entries, the most for any target in any "MAD 20" issue (the other three were about Trump's team of advisors, his sexist remarks, his paying no taxes, and investigations of the Trump Foundation).
- 2017: "Russkie Business", a parody of the movie poster for the 1983 film Risky Business, mocking Donald Trump's association with the ongoing investigation into collusion and Russian involvement in the 2016 Presidential election. It was the first of a full dozen Trump-related entries, though Trump only had a supporting role in some of them, such as Vice President Mike Pence, Kathy Griffin's much-criticized photo of a beheaded Trump, the reactions to quarterback Colin Kaepernick's civil rights protest, or the racist white supremacist/Nazi rally in Charlottesville.
- 2018: "Infamous Monsters of Movieland," a parody of the 1960s/70s horror/sci-fi magazine Famous Monsters of Filmland, mocking the various celebrities accused or convicted of sexual misconduct or rape, including Bill Cosby, Harvey Weinstein, Kevin Spacey, Les Moonves, Matt Lauer, Roger Ailes, Bill O'Reilly, Charlie Rose and Louis CK. A woman is holding the magazine with a look of horror, and her hair sticking up in fright.

== Running gags and recurring images ==
The Mad Style Guide (1994), showing several of the magazine's repeated images.

Mad has made frequent use of esoteric words, including potrzebie, furshlugginer, veeblefetzer, Moxie, ganef, halavah, and axolotl. Many, but not all of these words are of Yiddish or Jewish origin. Favored humorous names included Melvin, Bitsko, Kaputnik, Cowznofski, and Fonebone. Mad used the word "ecch" or its cousins "blecch" and "yecch" as an all-purpose expression of disgust so often that even The Simpsons later made passing references to the practice, showing Mad covers with the unseen parodies "Beauty and the Blecch" and "NYPD Blecch".

The word "hoohah" was an early running gag, often exclaimed by excited characters in the comic book issues written by Harvey Kurtzman; the first story in the first issue of Mad was titled "Hoohah!". Its Eastern European feel was a perfect fit for the New York Jewish style of the publication. The precise origin of "hoohah" is unknown, although it may have sprung from the Hungarian word for "wow", which is hűha.

"It's crackers to slip a rozzer the dropsy in snide" was a non sequitur-ish phrase that found its way into Mad on several occasions in the 1950s; this was dated British slang meaning "It's madness to bribe a policeman with counterfeit money." (The phrase originated in Margery Allingham's mid-thirties detective novel, The Fashion in Shrouds).

Some of the magazine's visual elements are whimsical, frequently appearing in the artwork without context or explanation. Among these are a potted avocado plant named Arthur (reportedly based on art director John Putnam's personal marijuana plant); a domed trashcan wearing an overcoat; a pointing six-fingered hand; the Mad Zeppelin (which more closely resembles an early experimental non-rigid airship); and an emaciated long-beaked creature who went unidentified for decades before being dubbed "Flip the Bird".

In late 1964, Mad was tricked into purchasing the "rights" to an optical illusion already in the public domain, featuring a sort of three-pronged tuning fork whose appearance defies physical possibility. The magazine dubbed it the "Mad poiuyt" after the six rightmost letter keys on a QWERTY keyboard in reverse order, not realizing that the existing image was already known to engineers and usually called a blivet.

Mad cartoonists have regularly drawn themselves, fellow contributors and editors, and family members into the articles, most famously Dave Berg's self-caricature "Roger Kaputnik". Al Jaffee sometimes incorporates a self-caricature into his signature, most notably in his fold-ins. The magazine's photo spreads have typically featured Mad's own staff. Originally, the magazine tried hiring models for its photo shoots, but found that many were unwilling to make the exaggerated faces the magazine wanted. While trying to prompt the reluctant outsiders with demonstrations, the magazine staff soon decided that they were better suited for foolish posing than the professionals, and more cost-effective.

In the 1990s and 2000s, the magazine has made periodic references to "the monkey juice", generally in the context of over-imbibing with same. Many letter column responses are punctuated with the breezy interjection "Fa fa fa!". The mysterious name "Max Korn" has popped up for years; reader requests to clarify Korn's true identity have been greeted with increasingly outlandish explanations.

Regardless of the amount, the changing cover price of Mad has long been followed by the word "Cheap!". Variants have occasionally appeared; following an increase from 25 to 30 cents, the successive issues claimed to be "Cheap" (but X'd out), "Cheap?", and "Kinda Cheap". A rise to 40 cents sparked almost a year's worth of variations: "Ouch!", "Outrageous!", "No Laughing Matter", "Relatively Cheap", "Cheap (Considering)", and again, "Cheap?". Other price increases were billed as "Almost Cheap", "Inflated!", and for a cover featuring Bonnie and Clyde, "Highway Robbery".
