= Scary Terry =

Scary Terry may refer to:

- Scary Terry, a character in the Rick and Morty episode "Lawnmower Dog"
- Terry McLaurin, American football player nicknamed Scary Terry
- Terry Rozier, American basketball player nicknamed Scary Terry
