= Fear No Mort =

- Rick and Morty episode
- Episode no.: Season 7 Episode 10
- Directed by: Eugene Huang
- Written by: Heather Anne Campbell
- Original air date: December 17, 2023

Episode chronology
← Previous "Mort: Ragnarick"	Next → "Summer of All Fears"
- Rick and Morty season 7

"Fear No Mort" is the tenth and final episode of Rick and Morty's seventh season. Written by Heather Anne Campbell and directed by Eugene Huang, the episode was met with strong praise by both the community and independent publications.

== Plot ==
Rick and Morty encounter a strange man in a suit (voiced by Liev Schreiber) at a horror themed amusement park on a foreign planet. The man suggests that Rick and Morty, being unimpressed with the park, follow his directions to the true scariest place in the universe. They land at a Denny's and Rick and Morty, assuming they were scammed into giving a free ride, decide to sit down and eat. The waiter casually mentions that the "Fear Hole" is in the men's bathroom, where Rick and Morty find a hole in a stall accompanied with a television featuring a brief instructional video starring the man in the suit. He explains that the hole recreates your greatest fear so that you can conquer it and leave fearless. Rick decides against jumping in the hole, but Morty quickly turns around and runs back to jump in.

After dropping down in the hole, Morty is attacked by grotesque monsters who attempt to mutilate him, but Rick jumps down and attacks the monsters before flying out with Morty in a rush. The two return to their house and quickly realize they're still in the hole when Rick's deceased wife, Diane, falls into the living room from out of thin air.

Rick and "Diane" rekindle their love after a rocky start, while Morty's concern grows. Morty identifies his fear of not being accepted as his unresolved fear and starts triggering it as well as he can. Rick finds Morty naked and visibly in poor health on a stage during a school performance of Three Days of Rain. Rick abandons "Diane," performs a rap song with Morty, and they ascend out of the hole.

However, they realize that they are still in the hole, and attempt to escape repeatedly without success. Eventually, they decide that they are supposed to just carry on with their lives without considering whether they remain in the hole. After many years pass, Morty ascends from the hole again and finally realizes that Rick didn't follow him into the hole, and that his real fear was relying on Rick.

Finally, Morty comes out of the hole for real to see Rick standing in front of it, having never having jumped down. Morty leaves, and Rick retrieves a picture of Morty from his wallet and puts it on the board of people who survived the fear hole.

== Reception ==
Since its release, Fear No Mort has been considered one of Rick and Morty's greatest episodes of all time (the following rankings are all relative to other Rick and Morty episodes).

Slashfilm ranked Fear No Mort #10 on its list of top 15 episodes.

Ranker.com ranked Fear No Mort #13 on its list of most upvoted episodes.

IGN ranked Fear No Mort #20 on its best episodes list.

In combination with her other season 7 work "That's Amorte", this episode's praise helped solidify Heather Anne Campbell as a top contributor to Rick and Morty.
