= Tom Fowler (cartoonist) =

Canadian cartoonist

- Born: January 6 Northern Ontario
- Areas: Penciller, Inker

Tom Fowler is a Canadian cartoonist living in Ottawa, Ontario, Canada.

His published work includes Monroe feature in the MAD magazine, Mysterius the Unfathomable, Quantum & Woody, Green Arrow, Venom, Hulk: Season One, Prince of Persia: Before the Sandstorm and Howtoons: [Re]Ignition. He has also illustrated several cards in the Doomtown collectible card game. In 2016, he made his writing debut on Oni Press' Rick and Morty series, writing the arcs "Head-Space", "The Noble Pursuit of Fair Play", and "Big Game".

== Bibliography ==
Interior comic work includes:

- Oni Double Feature #12-13: "The Honor Rollers" (with Paul Dini, anthology, Oni Press, 1999)
- Star Wars Tales #3: "The Death of Captain Tarpals" (with Ryder Windham, anthology, Dark Horse, 2000)
- The Blair Witch Chronicles #3: "Magik Circle" (with Jen Van Meter, Oni Press, 2000)
- Oni Press Color Special #2: "Adventure #206" (script and art, anthology, Oni Press, 2001)
- Paper Museum (anthology, Jungle Boy Press):
  - "Saxon the Swordsman" (with Jai Nitz, in #1, 2002)
  - "Lamb's War" (script and art, in #2, 2003)
- Star Wars: Jango Fett (with Ron Marz, graphic novel, Dark Horse, 2002)
- Grendel: Red, White and Black #1: "Devil's Dash" (with Matt Wagner, anthology, Maverick, 2002)
- Batman: Legends of the Dark Knight #168: "Urban Legend" (with Bill Willingham, DC Comics, 2003)
- Caper #9-12: "On Ice" (with Judd Winick, DC Comics, 2004)
- MAD (anthology magazine, DC Comics):
  - "When Spider-Man Goes Completely International" (with David Shayne, among other artists, in #448, 2004)
  - "20 Dumbest People, Events and Things of 2004" (with Desmond Devlin, among other writers and artists, in #449, 2005)
  - "Monroe" (with Anthony Barbieri, in #470-482, 484, 486-487, 489-491, 493, 495-496, 498 and 502, 2006–2010)
  - "50 Worst Things About Advertising" (with Jeff Kruse and Scott Maiko, among other artists, in #482, 2007)
  - "Great Monkeys in American History" (with Teresa Burns Parkhurst, in #488, 2008)
- Zombie Tales: Oblivion: "Memento Mori" (with John Rogers, anthology one-shot, Boom! Studios, 2005)
- Green Arrow vol. 3 #46-48, 50, 52 (with Judd Winick and Tommy Castillo (#50), DC Comics, 2005)
- The Grimoire #7 (with Chris Stone, Speakeasy, 2005)
- Revolution on the Planet of the Apes #3-4, 6 (with Joe O'Brien, Ty Templeton and Salgood Sam (#6), Mr. Comics, 2006)
- Justice League Unlimited #29: "Untamed" (inks on Carlo Barberi, written by Adam Beechen, Johnny DC, 2007)
- Pushing Daisies #0: "Head" (layouts for Zach Howard, written by Bryan Fuller, Wildstorm, 2007)
- Mysterius the Unfathomable #1-6 (with Jeff Parker, Wildstorm, 2009)
- Prince of Persia: Before the Sandstorm (with Jordan Mechner and various artists, graphic novel, Disney Press, 2010)
- I am an Avenger #1: "Welcome Home, Squirrel Girl!" (with Alex Zalben, anthology, Marvel, 2010)
- Deadpool Team-Up #888 (with Cullen Bunn, Marvel, 2010)
- Venom vol. 2 #3, 5-8 (with Rick Remender and Tony Moore (#5), Marvel, 2011)
- Outlaw Territory Volume 2: "Rustling Up Business..." (with Rich Johnston, anthology graphic novel, Image, 2011)
- Jim Henson's The Storyteller Volume 1: "Old Fire Dragaman" (with Jeff Parker, anthology graphic novel, Archaia, 2011)
- Hulk: Season One (with Fred Van Lente, graphic novel, Marvel, 2012)
- Time Warp: "It's Full of Demons" (with Tom King, anthology one-shot, Vertigo, 2013)
- The Thrilling Adventure Hour: "Beyond Belief" (with Ben Acker and Ben Blacker, anthology graphic novel, Archaia, 2013)
- Quantum and Woody vol. 2 #1–4, 0 (with James Asmus, Valiant, 2013–2014)
- Creepy vol. 2 #14: "Black Feathers"(with Ray Fawkes, anthology, Dark Horse, 2013)
- X-O Manowar vol. 3 #25: "Battle for the Ages" (script and art, co-feature, Valiant, 2014)
- Nick Dragotta's Howtoons: [Re]Igniton #1–5 (with Fred Van Lente, Image, 2014)
- CBLDF Presents Liberty Annual '14: "Little Star" (script and art, with Jeff Parker, anthology, Image, 2014)
- Sensation Comics vol. 2 Chapter 31–32: "Return of Gaia" (with Derek Fridolfs, digital, DC Comics, 2015)
- Rick and Morty (as writer, Oni Press):
  - "Head-Space" (with CJ Cannon, in #12–14, 2016)
  - "The Noble Pursuit of Fair Play" (script and art, in #15, 2016)
  - "Big Game" (script and art, in Treasury Edition #2, 2016)
- The Unbeatable Squirrel Girl (Marvel):
  - Volume 2 #9–10 (inks on Erica Henderson, written by Ryan North, 2016)
  - ...Beats Up the Marvel Universe (inks on Erica Henderson, written by Ryan North, graphic novel, 2016)
  - "Brain Drain's Olde-Tyme Feel-Good Inspirational Corner" (with Ryan North, co-feature in vol. 2 #26, 2018)
- Doom Patrol vol. 6 #6, 8–11 (inks on Nick Derington, written by Gerard Way, DC's Young Animal, 2017–2018)
- Where We Live: "Everything After" (with Justin Jordan, anthology graphic novel, Image, 2018)
- The Sandman Universe (with Kat Howard and other writers and artists, anthology one-shot, Vertigo, 2018)
- The Books of Magic vol. 3 #1–ongoing (with Kat Howard and Brian Churilla, Vertigo/DC Black Label, 2018–...)
- Dial H for Hero #4: "Detroit City Blues" (inks on Joe Quinones, written by Sam Humphries, DC Comics, 2019)

=== Covers only ===
- Batman: Legends of the Dark Knight #180–181 (DC Comics, 2004)
- Archer and Armstrong vol. 2 #8–9, 0, 14 (Valiant, 2013)
- Quantum and Woody vol. 2 #7–9, 12 (Valiant Comics, 2014)
- Magnus, Robot Fighter vol. 5 #1 (Dynamite, 2014)
- Bloodshot and the H.A.R.D. Corps #21 (Valiant, 2014)
- X-O Manowar vol. 3 #38, 40, 50 (jam cover) (Valiant, 2015–2016)
- Hulk vol. 2 #8 (Marvel, 2015)
- Superior Iron Man #1 (Marvel, 2015)
- The Multiversity Guidebook #1 (DC Comics, 2015)
- Book of Death: The Fall of Bloodshot #1 (Valiant, 2015)
- Rick and Morty #6 (Oni Press, 2015)
- The CBLDF Presents Liberty Annual '15 (Image, 2015)
- Wrath of the Eternal Warrior #1, 3 (Valiant, 2015–2016)
- Ivar, Timewalker #11 (Valiant, 2015)
- Howard the Duck vol. 6 #2 (Marvel, 2016)
- Insufferable: On the Road #3 (IDW Publishing, 2016)
- Lake of Fire #4 (Image, 2016)
- Cosmic Bowl #1 (The Flop House, 2017)
- Shirtless Bear-Fighter! #1 (Image, 2017)
- Athena Voltaire #1 (Action Lab, 2018)
- Quantum and Woody vol. 3 #8–11 (Valiant, 2018)
