= Head-Space =

American limited series graphic novel

- Art by Tom Fowler
- Date: March 30, 2016 (Part 1); April 27, 2016 (Part 2); May 25, 2016 (Part 3)
- No. of issues: 3 (+2 one-shots)
- Main characters: Morty Smith C-132 (Morty'Dyb); Rick Sanchez C-132 (QuasRick Haderach) Rick C-137 and Morty Prime (cameos)
- Publisher: Oni Press

Creative team
- Writers: Tom Fowler; Pamela Ribon (Ready Player Morty)
- Artists: CJ Cannon; Marc Ellerby (Ready Player Morty); Tom Fowler (Big Game); Mady G. (variant covers)
- Letterers: Crank!
- Colourists: Ryan Hill
- Creators: Justin Roiland; Dan Harmon
- Editors: Ari Yarwood; Hillary Thompson

Original publication
- Published in: Rick and Morty
- ISBN: 978-1-7858-5985-4

Chronology
- Preceded by: The Rickfinity Crisis
- Followed by: The Ricky Horror Peacock Show

Head-Space (alternatively stylised as Headspace, without the hyphen) is a graphic novel, written by Tom Fowler (in his writing debut) and illustrated by CJ Cannon, which was released in three parts throughout 2016 by Oni Press as the third volume of the Rick and Morty comic series, based on the television series and franchise of the same name by Justin Roiland and Dan Harmon. The only multi-part story arc of the series written by Fowler, following the departure of Zac Gorman, and before the introduction of Kyle Starks, loosely adapting Dune by Frank Herbert, Part One was released on March 30, 2016, Part Two on April 27, 2016, and Part Three on May 25, 2016, with the collected volume including the one-shots Ready Player Morty and Big Game (The Noble Pursuit of Fair Play), respectively written by Pamela Ribon, illustrated by Marc Ellerby, and released February 24, 2016; and written and illustrated by Fowler, and released June 29, 2016.

The series is notable as the last Rick and Morty comic series arc to follow the Rick Sanchez and Morty Smith of Dimension C-132 (who are killed at the conclusion of the storyline), with most subsequent arcs of the main series switching focus to follow Rick C-137 and Morty Prime, the same versions of the characters from the television series (via the plot element of interdimenstional travel). In September 2021, Christopher Lloyd and Jaeden Martell respectively portrayed the Rick and Morty of Dimension C-132 in one of a series of promotional interstitials, directed by Paul B. Cummings.

== Development ==
Speaking on his "writing stint" on Rick and Morty ahead of its March release in January 2016, in a non-spoiler interview with Paste Magazine, Tom Fowler revealed the arc would be inspired by the first season of Rick and Morty (having then not seen the second season), in particular "Rick Potion #9", and that as the veteran illustrator's writing debut, he would be "carte blanche to do anything, as long as you can come up with some kind of [a] scientific explanation that's both coherently and comedically relevant" with one issue of Zac Gorman's run additionally providing inspiration for the three-issue arc:

In one issue of Zac [Gorman]'s that I read all the way through, they're in this alien death maze, and there's only enough charge in the portal gun to get one of them out. Rick gives Morty some kind of excuse and shoves him through. Then there's this beat where Rick is alone at the end of this maze. It's a silent panel, and you just see how sad and like, existentially alone Rick is. That hit me in the gut, and I said, "Okay, that's what I'm going for. That's the thing I want to keep. Everything else can be drawn from whatever situations I or my 8-year-old can come up with."

In September 2021, Christopher Lloyd and Jaeden Martell respectively portrayed the Rick Sanchez and Morty Smith of Dimension C-132 in one of a series of three promotional interstitials, directed by Paul B. Cummings. Several Mortys inspired by Dune-based third chapter of Head-Space (and HeRicktics of Rick) were made available as playable characters in updates to the free-to-play role-playing video game Pocket Mortys.

== Reception ==
Issue #	Publication date	Critic rating	Critic reviews	Ref.
1	March 2016	7.9/10	5	
2	April 2016	8.1/10	4	
3	May 2016	8.3/10	3	
Overall		8.1/10	12	

Bob Franco of Comics Verse complimented the "fun adventure with plenty of laughs and imaginative situations" of Ready Player Morty, with Emily Gaudette of Inverse describing Big Game as a "non-enthused novelization of the show", and David Brooke of AIPT Comics complimenting Fowler as "manag[ing] to capture the [concept of] rage and fear so damn well there's no question [what] is a comedically traumatic moment" in depicting the inner rage of Morty Smith.

== Collected editions ==
Title	Material collected	Published date	ISBN
Rick and Morty Volume 3 – Head-Space (Trade Paperback)	Rick and Morty #11–15.	September 21, 2016	978-1785859854
Rick and Morty Book 2: Deluxe Edition	Rick and Morty #11–20, cover art, extra art, introduction, and an exclusive sound clip of Rick Sanchez and Morty Smith (as originally voiced by Justin Roiland; 2013–2022).	November 7, 2017	978-1620104392
