= Tsui no Taimashi: Ender Geister =

Japanese manga series

- Cover of the first print volume

終の退魔師: エンダーガイスター (Tsui no Taimashi: Endā Gaisutā)
- Genre: Action; Supernatural
- Manga
- Written by: Takashi Yomoyama
- Published by: Cygames; Shogakukan
- Imprint: Ura Sunday Comics
- Magazine: Cycomi
- Original run: November 30, 2019 – present
- Volumes: 27

Tsui no Taimashi: Ender Geister (終の退魔師: エンダーガイスター, Tsui no Taimashi: Endā Gaisutā) is a Japanese manga series written by Takashi Yomoyama. It began serialization on Cygames' Cycomi manga website in November 2019.

== Synopsis ==
A mysterious phenomenon known as the "Pillar of Darkness" originated from Toriku University Hospital in Bandai, Japan. Since the phenomenon, demons have become increasingly violent, killing 15 exorcists within three months and leaving more than three times that number missing. Akira Kurosawa, an exorcist affiliated with the Demon Exorcism Association, is dispatched from Germany to Japan to investigate the cause of this abnormal situation. Before he can begin his investigation with fellow Japanese exorcists Chikage Awashima and Kinjirō Tomori, enemies begin attacking one after another.

== Characters ==
Akira Kurosawa (黒沢 アキラ, Kurosawa Akira)
Voiced by: Chikahiro Kobayashi (voice comic)
Chikage Awashima (淡縞 千景, Awashima Chikage)
Voiced by: Yui Ishikawa (voice comic)
Kinjirō Tōmori (東森 琴次郎, Tōmori Kinjirō)
Voiced by: Yōhei Tadano (voice comic)
Nue (鵺)
Voiced by: Yoko Hikasa (voice comic)
Mujina (狢)
Voiced by: Eiji Takeuchi (voice comic)

== Media ==
=== Manga ===
Written and illustrated by Takashi Yomoyama, Tsui no Taimashi: Ender Geister began serialization on Cygames' Cycomi manga website on November 30, 2019. Its chapters have been collected by Shogakukan into ebooks and tankōbon volumes. Twenty-seven ebooks and tankōbon volumes have been released as of October 2026.

No.	Release date	ISBN
1	March 30, 2020 (ebook); August 18, 2021 (print)	978-4-09-850654-5
2	June 30, 2020 (ebook); November 18, 2021 (print)	978-4-09-850775-7
3	September 30, 2020 (ebook); February 17, 2022 (print)	978-4-09-850882-2
4	December 25, 2020 (ebook); May 18, 2022 (print)	978-4-09-851045-0
5	February 26, 2021 (ebook); July 19, 2022 (print)	978-4-09-851211-9
6	May 28, 2021 (ebook); September 16, 2022 (print)	978-4-09-851252-2
7	September 30, 2021 (ebook); November 17, 2022 (print)	978-4-09-851377-2
8	December 24, 2021 (ebook); January 19, 2023 (print)	978-4-09-851435-9
9	March 30, 2022 (ebook); March 17, 2023 (print)	978-4-09-851789-3
10	July 29, 2022 (ebook); May 19, 2023 (print)	978-4-09-852046-6
11	October 28, 2022 (ebook); July 19, 2023 (print)	978-4-09-852544-7
12	January 30, 2023 (ebook); September 19, 2023 (print)	978-4-09-852812-7
13	May 30, 2023 (ebook); November 17, 2023 (print)	978-4-09-853046-5
14	September 29, 2023 (ebook); January 18, 2024 (print)	978-4-09-853101-1
15	January 30, 2024 (ebook); March 19, 2024 (print)	978-4-09-853193-6
16	May 17, 2024	978-4-09-853318-3
17	September 19, 2024	978-4-09-853482-1
18	December 19, 2024	978-4-09-853786-0
19	March 18, 2025	978-4-09-854046-4
20	June 18, 2025	978-4-09-854162-1
21	September 19, 2025	978-4-09-854226-0
22	December 19, 2025	978-4-09-854379-3
23	February 19, 2026	978-4-09-854442-4
24	April 17, 2026	978-4-09-854494-3
25	June 19, 2026	978-4-09-854632-9
26	August 19, 2026	978-4-09-854749-4
27	October 19, 2026	978-4-09-854824-8
28	December 17, 2026	978-4-09-855057-9

=== Other ===
In commemoration of the release of the series' nineteenth volume on March 18, 2025, a voice comic adaptation was uploaded to Cycomics' YouTube channel that same day. It featured voice performances from Chikahiro Kobayashi, Yui Ishikawa, Yōhei Tadano, and Yoko Hikasa.

== Reception ==
The series has been recommended by manga artist ONE.

By January 2024, the series had over 1.6 million copies in circulation. By March 2025, the series had over 2.5 million copies in circulation.
