= That's Amorte =

- Rick and Morty episode
- Episode no.: Season 7 Episode 4
- Directed by: Lucas Gray
- Written by: Heather Anne Campbell
- Original air date: November 5, 2023

Episode chronology
| ← Previous "Air Force Wong" | Next → "Unmortricken" |
- Rick and Morty season 7

"That's Amorte" is the fourth episode of the seventh season of the American animated television series Rick and Morty. Written by Heather Anne Campbell and directed by Lucas Gray, it aired on Cartoon Network's nighttime programming block Adult Swim on November 5, 2023.

== Plot ==
Rick serves the family spaghetti, which Morty accidentally discovers came from a person's body. Rick shows Morty a planet where its inhabitants, who are otherwise identical to humans, turn into the best spaghetti in the universe if they commit suicide, but not if they die by any other means. Feeling guilty, Morty attends the funeral of Lawrence Maps, the person they ate, and reveals the truth to the people there. After this, the planet's President turns the planet into a bleak, depressing dystopia to encourage more people to commit suicide so they can sell the spaghetti on the interplanetary market, which proves so popular they can't produce enough of it to meet demand. Rick attempts to mass-produce clones to source spaghetti from, who kill each other to prevent their bodies from turning into spaghetti. He then tries mass-producing artificial headless, one-armed torsos to make spaghetti from. The factory gets attacked by aliens protesting the poor taste of the new spaghetti and spaghetti-people protesting how the torsos are still people, and both groups destroy the factory in a suicide-bombing. As a result of not being able to fulfill orders for more spaghetti the planet finds itself being invaded by alien species who want more spaghetti, causing the near collapse of their society.

After Morty begs Rick to fix the problem he created, Rick finds one last terminally ill person, Fred Bunks, whom he convinces to commit suicide on a live broadcast while his entire life plays on a screen: After Fred flunked out of his engineering school, he broke up with his girlfriend Amber, and moved back with his parents. After Fred's parents passed away, he created a Lego equivalent known as Fredblox and found success. Fred reconnected with Amber, now married to Lawrence Maps with two children; Amber divorced Lawrence to marry Fred, and when she died she was buried next to Fred's parents. As Fred euthanizes himself, everyone vomits at the horrors they are committing and agrees to cancel the spaghetti trade. Later, Rick serves the family Salisbury steak, warning that its source is also horrifying. The family laughs this off, content to remain ignorant of its origin.

In a post-credits scene, on a planet of sentient vacuum cleaners, a similar planet-wide broadcast reveals that vacuum bags come from deceased plant creatures, causing all the vacuums to vomit dust.

== Production ==
"That's Amorte" was written before co-creator Justin Roiland was fired from the series, but features his voice actor replacements Ian Cardoni (as Rick) and Harry Belden (as Morty). The episode was written by Heather Anne Campbell, who also wrote the food-based sixth season episode "Final DeSmithation" (about a fortune cookie). Campbell chose spaghetti due to its connotations as a "family meal". According to The Mary Sue, the cast found the script more surprising than anything else in the seventh season and the network was initially unsure about approving it.

Campbell said that people are "barricaded from the truth" of how commodities are produced, but they are the only animals concerned with ethics of what they eat. Co-creator Dan Harmon said that suicide and society's interpretation of its morality was the source of "very dark cosmic mirth", but that the show's nihilism should not be "punishing empathy".

From the first draft, the episode featured a lengthy montage of a dying person's life without dialogue. Campbell said that the "detours and disappointments" in the character's life were important to provide realism. Ideas were considered that did not make the final script: depictions of characters jumping off buildings and turning into spaghetti; Morty selling spaghetti in the style of drug dealer Walter White; or Rick's conscience leading him to stop the spaghetti production process.

Summer pronounces parmesan unusually (Note: /pɑːrmiːzjiːɪn/ par-MEE-zee-in) in a reference to "Solaricks", where Rick relocates the family after disaster to a dimension identical to theirs except for the pronunciation of parmesan. Showrunner Scott Marder said that allowed writers to tell fans that the program's storyline had not been forgotten, in response to fan feedback to the fifth season.

== Analysis ==
The episode asks questions about animal rights and the ethics of eating meat by depicting food that comes from suffering. Other themes include deliberate ignorance and greed under capitalism, in connection to the phrase "there can be no ethical consumption under capitalism". It presents a number of different situations, such as one where a person consents to being eaten, and one where the government purposefully worsens quality of life to encourage suicide.

The Daily Beast's Allegra Frank said the episode's conceit fits the "gross-out sci-fi humor" of the program and its "nonsensical" setups. Inverse's Corey Plante commented that Morty acting on surface-level moral observations frequently leads to catastrophe, but after this happens in "That's Amorte" he promises to Rick that he will "never look under the curtain at a Rick thing to figure out what's bad about it ever again". Like the popular episodes "The Vat of Acid Episode" and "A Rickconvenient Mort", it has a serious, emotional climax. The montage is similar to one in "Mortynight Run", wherein Roy—a video game character played by Morty—experiences childhood sporting success, marries his love interest from school, and overcomes cancer.

== Reception ==
The episode's premiere on Adult Swim was watched by 0.44 million viewers.

In a four-star review for Starburst, Anthony Oleszkiewicz said it was significantly better than the season's first three episodes. Oleszkiewicz praised its characterization, including Morty's anxiety and Rick's knowledge of his moral outrage. However, he believed the message of "individualistic rebellion against unfair systems" had been conveyed better in previous episodes, such as "Final DeSmithation" or "The Ricklantis Mixup".

Collider's Nischal Niraula lauded the montage as the most successful in the program because it authentically depicts the "turbulent trajectory of an ordinary life". Lex Briscuso of IGN praised the choreography of the montage, including the cover of "Live Forever" by Oasis, saying that the show uses "realistic and moving emotionality" sparingly and effectively.

The Amazing Kreskin, best known for his frequent appearances on The Tonight Show with Johnny Carson, had recorded a video of himself discussing the episode in which he makes the claim that the episode has led to a significant drop in people buying spaghetti. However, this claim is not supported by independent data and appears to be his personal opinion rather than a documented effect.
