= P. C. Vey =

American cartoonist (1955–2026)

Peter C. Vey
- Born: October 23, 1955; New York City, U.S.
- Died: September 17, 2026 (aged 70); Amherst, Massachusetts, U.S.
- Occupation: Cartoonist
- Notable work: Duke Bissell's Tales of Undisputed Interest, Vey To Go
- Website: P.C. Vey's Website

Peter Christopher Vey (October 23, 1955 – September 17, 2026) was an American cartoonist. Vey's cartoons have appeared in many publications such as The New Yorker, National Lampoon and MAD Magazine. His two major contributions to MAD include Duke Bissell's Tales of Undisputed Interest and one panel gag cartoons under the title Vey To Go. Vey collaborated with American filmmaker, Bill Plympton as a writer and artist of several of his animated features.

Vey was born in Manhattan, New York. He majored in media arts and cartooning at the School of Visual Arts, graduating in 1978. He died of pancreatic cancer at his home in Amherst, Massachusetts, on September 17, 2026, at the age of 70.
