= Lawnmower Dog =

- Rick and Morty episode
- Episode no.: Season 1 Episode 2
- Directed by: John Rice
- Written by: Ryan Ridley
- Original air date: December 9, 2013
- Running time: 21 minutes

Guest appearance
- Rob Paulsen as Snowball

Episode chronology
← Previous "Pilot"	Next → "Anatomy Park"
- Rick and Morty (season 1)

"Lawnmower Dog" is the second episode of Rick and Morty. It premiered on Adult Swim on December 9, 2013, was written by Ryan Ridley, and directed by John Rice. In the episode, Rick gives Jerry a device to enhance the dog's intelligence while Rick and Morty get lost in the dreams of Morty's math teacher. The episode was well received by critics, and it was seen by approximately 1.5 million viewers when it premiered.

The title is a reference to the movie The Lawnmower Man (1992), in which a scientist enhances the intellect of a simple-minded gardener. The plot of dogs gaining intelligence and taking over the planet is also similar to Rise of the Planet of the Apes (2011) and the Planet of the Apes franchise in general. Meanwhile, the plot involving Rick and Morty's adventure is a parody of the 2010 film Inception as well as the Nightmare on Elm Street franchise.

== Plot ==
Morty's dog Snuffles angers Jerry by continually urinating on the carpet. Upset, Jerry asks Rick for a device that could make Snuffles smarter. Rick makes the device, and it makes Snuffles smart enough for him to be able to do things like a normal human, like going to the bathroom. Meanwhile, Rick plans to enter the dreams of Morty's math teacher, Mr. Goldenfold, in order for him to increase Morty's grades, thus letting Morty adventure with Rick more often. The two enter Goldenfold's dream. The dream takes place on a plane, where Rick pretends to be an Islamic terrorist threatening to hijack and "9/11" the plane if Goldenfold does not give Morty better grades, but Goldenfold decides to fight back and pulls out two machine guns. Rick realizes that Goldenfold has more control over his dreams than he had anticipated, and also reveals that if they die in the dream, they die in real life. Meanwhile, Snuffles attempts to communicate with his owners verbally but is unable. He opens the battery compartment on the helmet and realizes that it can be boosted with additional batteries.

Still stuck in the dream, Rick tries to negotiate with Goldenfold using his idol, Mrs. Pancakes, as a human shield. Instead, chaos descends on the plane. The doors to the plane are opened, and everyone gets blown out. Mrs. Pancakes finds a parachute and opens it, while Goldenfold has already landed the plane. Rick and Morty grab onto Pancakes, but Goldenfold has created a device to pluck Pancakes out of the sky and leave Rick and Morty to fall in a pool of lava. The two then incept themselves into Pancakes' dreams to slow time down. Pancakes' dreams are of an intergalactic sex club and S&M dungeon, filled with dominatrices. A lingerie-clad Summer representing Mr. Goldenfold's deeply repressed sexual attraction to her flirts with the two, causing them to panic and stand out. A centaur guard threatens to kill them, and they venture into the centaur's dream, where the three have to run away from a "legally safe knockoff" of Freddy Krueger, named Scary Terry. Meanwhile, Snuffles has created a robotic arm and a speaker that he uses to grab things and communicate, albeit in broken English. Snuffles' view on life changes after watching a TV special about dogs being domesticated and being forced into subservience.

Still seeking an escape, Rick and Morty travel into a little girl's dream to escape Scary Terry. After returning to what looks like the same dream, the two also find out that Terry can travel across dreams. After building himself a powerful robotic suit, Snuffles changes his name to Snowball and assumes dominance over the household. While in a new dream, Rick and Morty are still being chased by Terry. The two follow him back into his house and enter his dreams. They see that he is fearful of being a failure in his job and save him from being embarrassed in school. In return, he helps them return to reality, and in the process, convince Goldenfold to raise Morty's grades. Back in the regular world, they find that Snowball has led an army of hyper-intelligent dogs to the verge of global domination over humanity. Jerry tries to stop them by urinating on their weapons like a dog, which only causes them to get captured. Snowball allows Morty to live by his side while the rest of the world is enslaved at the whim of the dogs. While the dogs are subjecting the humans to similar practices that the humans subjected the dogs to, Morty lives in luxury. After what Morty perceives to be a year, Rick reappears and reveals to him that the two are actually in Snowball's dream. Rick gives Morty kidney failure via pills that Morty believes will wake him, making Snowball care for Morty's health. Snowball comes out of his dream and realizes that oppressing humans brings heartbreak and cruelty. Snowball and the dogs change their plan and decide instead to inhabit a world of their own.

In the post-credits scene, the old teacher of Scary Terry's class has been replaced by Scary Glenn, a hippie drum player. Rick and Scary Terry are sitting as his students, smoking marijuana, satisfied with this change.

== Reception ==
The A.V. Club gave the episode an A rating, with reviewer Zach Handlen noting that it was the "pinnacle of the show thus far". Junkey Monkey's reviewer William Manzo praised the episode, saying that the episode was "a welcome surprise when compared to the pilot", giving it a 10/10.
