= Rick Sanchez =

Fictional character

- Rick and Morty character
- First appearance: Rick C-137: "Pilot" (2013); Rick C-132: "The Wubba Lubba Dub Dub of Wall Street, Part One" (2015); Rick Prime: "The Rickshank Rickdemption" (2017)
- Last appearance: Rick C-132: "Head-Space, Part Three" (2016); Rick Prime: "Unmortricken" (2023)
- Created by: Justin Roiland; Dan Harmon
- Designed by: Justin Roiland
- Inspired by: Dr. Emmett "Doc" Brown by; Robert Zemeckis; Bob Gale; Reed Richards / Mr. Fantastic by; Stan Lee; Jack Kirby
- Voiced by: Justin Roiland (2013–2022); Ian Cardoni (2023–present); Yōhei Tadano (The Anime, Japanese dub; 2016–present); Joe Daniels (English dub of The Anime); Michael Cusack (Bushworld Adventures)
- Portrayed by: Christopher Lloyd (interstitials); Santana Maynard (The Rickoning promo)

In-universe information
- Full name: Richard Sanchez
- Aliases: The Rickest Rick (Rick Prime); The Smartest Man in the Universe (seasons 1–5)
- Nickname: Rick
- Title: Rick C-137 (main character)
- Occupation: Scientist; Inventor; Founder of the Citadel; Freedom fighter (formerly)
- Affiliation: Birdperson (best friend); Mr. Poopybutthole (family friend); Mr. Nimbus (nemesis); Galactic Revolution; The Vindicators
- Family: Parallel universe: Jerry Smith 5126 (son-in-law); Summer Smith C-131 (granddaughter); Morty Smith Prime (grandson); Hemorrhage (grandson-in-law); Morty Smith, Jr. (great-grandson); Naruto Smith (great-grandson); Thoolie Smith (great-grandson); Slow Mobius (uncle)
- Spouses: Diane Sanchez C-137 (wife; erased from reality)
- Significant others: Unity (hivemind; formerly); Kiara (formerly); Daphne (formerly); Gaia (formerly); Princess Poñeta (CHUD)
- Children: Beth Sanchez C-137 (and by proxy Beth Smith C-131 and Space Beth C-131); The CHUD Heir
- Nationality: American
- Age: 50s, 60s or 70s

Rick Sanchez is the titular co-protagonist of, alongside Morty Smith, Adult Swim's Rick and Morty franchise.

Created by Justin Roiland and Dan Harmon, he was voiced by Roiland during the first six seasons of the series, then by Ian Cardoni beginning with the seventh season, and Yōhei Tadano in Rick and Morty: The Anime, after voicing the character in the Japanese dub of the series and various promotional short films. Rick is a misanthropic and alcoholic mad scientist inspired by Christopher Lloyd's Dr. Emmett "Doc" Brown from Back to the Future and Reed Richards / Mr. Fantastic from Marvel Comics. In September 2021, Lloyd portrayed Rick himself in a series of promotional interstitials for the series.

The first three volumes of the Rick and Morty comic series follow the Rick and Morty of Dimension C-132 while most issues of subsequent volumes (following the "Head-Space" arc in which Rick C-132 is killed) follow the main Rick (C-137) and Morty (Prime) from the television series, with the final volume ("The Rickoning") and Rick and Morty Go to Hell following another alternate Rick (and Morty) identified as Devil Rick in the latter series, and featuring a Girl Rick designed after cosplayer Santana Maynard by series writer Kyle Starks; the video game Pocket Mortys meanwhile follows the Rick and Morty of C-123. Known for his reckless, nihilistic behavior, pragmatic moral ambiguity and pessimistic personality, the character has been well received.

== Fictional character biography ==
=== Backstory ===
Rick Sanchez from Earth C-137 is a mad scientist who seems to know everything in the universe and thus finds life a traumatizing and pointless experience. Following the murder of his wife Diane and daughter Beth Sanchez in his native reality (C-137) by his parallel self Rick Prime, Rick dedicates his life to hunting Prime down, developing inter-dimensional travel and a portal gun. Along the way, Rick befriends Birdperson and becomes a leading figure in the revolution against the Galactic Federation throughout his mid-30s. He also played the bass in a band with him and Squanchy as seen in Season 5, Episode 8. After being rejected by Birdperson, Rick returns to his journey of vengeance, before ultimately becoming the leader of a fledgling "Citadel of Ricks". The Citadel had originally formed to oppose him after he had killed a number of alternate versions of himself on his journey of vengeance, and under his guidance oversaw the binding of the multiverse's Ricks into a "Central Finite Curve" in which they are all the "Smartest Man in the Universe", manipulating the flow of realities in which his daughter lived to ensure that she met Jerry Smith in order to produce an endless number of hypothetical grandchildren, allowing them to hide from the Federation using their brainwaves. Depressed by his failure to locate Prime, Rick eventually abandons the Citadel and casts himself into the multiverse once again, crashing into the garage of a now-adult, living version of Beth from Rick Prime's reality, where Prime had abandoned her and Diane twenty years prior. Rick befriends her son, that reality's Morty Smith, and frequently traveled with him on adventures through space, visiting other planets and dimensions with him (and occasionally Summer Smith). In the third season of the show, it is revealed that he is at least 70 years old.

=== Television series ===
==== Season One ====
Rick's trademark catchphrase in the first season (and also appearing as a variation in the second season) is "Wubba Lubba Dub-Dub", first introduced in the episode "Meeseeks and Destroy". In Birdperson's native language, the catchphrase translates to "I am in great pain, please help me", an indication of Rick's depression. Justin Roiland revealed the catchphrase was created by mistake when he messed up reading the script; he was supposed to say "wub wub wub wub wub".

In the episode "Rick Potion #9", Rick reveals his disdain towards love, in which he claims that it is "a chemical reaction that compels animals to breed". When Rick and Morty irreversibly mutate all humans on Earth except for their family members, they abandon the dimension (and their family in that dimension) for a new one. Rick locates a universe in which the alternate version of himself has undone the damage inflicted by the love potion, but where the new dimension's Rick and Morty have been killed, allowing the C-137 Rick and Morty Prime to take their place. Despite Morty's trauma concerning this knowledge, Rick is nonchalant about moving to the new dimension.

Rick's intelligence is portrayed to transcend that of metaphysical beings, as demonstrated in the episode "Something Ricked This Way Comes", where he outsmarts Satan / Mr. Needful.

In the episode "Close Rick-counters of the Rick Kind", after numerous Ricks in alternate dimensions are murdered, the Trans-Dimensional Council of Ricks accuses Rick C-137 and orders for him to be arrested. Rick C-137 finds himself captured by an "evil" Rick (in actuality controlled by Evil Morty), but is saved by a legion of alternate-dimension Mortys led by his Morty.

==== Season Two ====
In the second season premiere, "A Rickle in Time", Rick nearly sacrifices himself to save Morty, but saves his own life when he realizes that doing so is possible. In the episode "Get Schwifty", it is revealed that Rick was once in a rock band called the Flesh Curtains, alongside Birdperson and Squanchy. In the episode "Big Trouble in Little Sanchez", Rick transfers his consciousness into a younger clone of himself, whom he calls "Tiny Rick". He soon becomes anguished in his new body, and manages to return to his older true form, and murders a line of other clones he produced.

In "The Ricks Must Be Crazy", Rick reveals that he powers his flying car with a battery that contains a miniature universe, or microverse, whose inhabitants unknowingly provide the required electricity. The inhabitants cease doing this after one of their scientists does the same thing for his own universe, and discovers that this is what Rick has done to his universe. Rick remorselessly destroys the miniature universe inside his own miniature universe, killing everyone inside. Nearing the end of the episode, Rick knows that his own microverse would choose to power his battery, or he would dispose of it and create a new one; as he put it, once he got out of the battery, he'd have one of two options: "either I'd have to toss out a broken battery, or the battery wouldn't be broken."

In the second season's finale, "The Wedding Squanchers", Rick and his family attend Birdperson's wedding, where Birdperson is betrayed and killed by his bride Tammy, a double agent for the Galactic Federation. The family is forced to inhabit an unusually small yet Earth-like planet, as they cannot return to Earth due to Rick's status as a wanted criminal. Rick turns himself into the Federation to allow his family to return home, and is incarcerated on a prison planet under the charges of having committed "everything".

==== Season Three ====
The premiere episode of the series' third season, "The Rickshank Rickdemption", shows a possible origin for Rick, in which he was a well-meaning scientist who loved his wife Diane and daughter Beth, but had an encounter with a member of a militant group of Ricks who had achieved inter-dimensional travel during his own initial testing of a prototype inter-dimensional portal gun, who offered him the secret to creating the device, and joining their organization. Shortly after his refusal, and his pledge to quit science forever, a bomb was sent through a portal, killing Diane and Beth. Rick claims that this was a fake memory he created in order to trick his interrogator into implanting a virus into the mind-reading device he was attached to, allowing him to hijack his body and escape from the Federation prison, having actually turned himself in to access the Federation's supercomputer and wipe it out financially, before taking out the Council of Ricks while saving Morty and Summer. At the end of the episode, after indirectly convincing Beth to divorce Jerry for trying to convince the family to sell him out, Rick again insists, in a rant to Morty, that the death of his wife and daughter as depicted was a fake memory; in the fifth season, his wife and daughter from his home reality are confirmed to have been caught in an explosion, with both being killed, the fake part of the memory having been Rick immediately developing an inter-dimensional portal gun himself to find a new family, rather than what he did in actuality: spent months developing the technology before spending the next thirty years attempting to track down the Rick in question (Rick Prime). Months later, Rick reluctantly attends family therapy under Dr. Wong in "Pickle Rick".

In "The ABC's of Beth", Beth learns from Rick that her childhood magical fantasy world of Froopyland was an actual place all Ricks had made for her as a child: a real procedurally-generated and childproofed pocket dimension he created for Beth, and that her memories of her childhood friend Tommy Lipnip who got lost inside of it are real. Upon reentering to locate Tommy, Rick discovers that the animals have become predatory and dangerous from segments of human DNA, with Tommy having survived to adulthood via a combination of bestiality and cannibalism. After Tommy accuses Beth of deliberately trapping him in the dimension as a child out of jealousy for his family, pushing him into a honey swamp in a murder attempt before leaving him there, Rick takes himself and Beth back without Tommy. After Beth accuses him of being a bad parent, Rick counters that he made Froopyland to keep her occupied because she was a violent child, and has no doubt Tommy's claims were true. Beth tries to go back to reason with Tommy, but ends up killing him and his offspring. Back at home, pondering whether she is evil, Beth is presented with the option by Rick of having a replacement clone of her created, so that she will be free to travel the universe without abandoning her family; on rewatching his own self-erased memory of the incident in "Star Mort Rickturn of the Jerri", Rick learns that Beth asked him to decide for himself whether he wanted her in his life, and his response was to use a centrifuge to randomize who was the original after creating a clone, having been unable to answer, in the present finally admitting to himself that he is "a terrible father". In "The Rickchurian Mortydate", while Rick is in a feud with the President, Beth begins to fear she might be the clone, with Rick's phrasing of the answer leading her to an existential crisis, and ultimately reuniting with Jerry and renewing their marriage, much to Rick's frustration. The season ends with the Smith family happy to be together again, although Rick is disappointed about losing his dominant position.

==== Season Four ====
In the fourth season finale "Star Mort Rickturn of the Jerri", Space Beth (the Beth who went to space, there-becoming the new "Most Wanted" of the Galactic Federation), believing herself to be the clone upon finding a device in her neck, confronts Rick, who reveals that the other Beth also has a device in her neck and claims she is the clone, and the pair go to Shoney's to chat about Space Beth's adventures. After the Federation soon arrives at Earth, demanding Space Beth be handed over, Rick accidentally lets slip that Space Beth might in fact be the clone, and races to Dr. Wong's office (where Beth and Jerry are at counselling) to save Beth from Tammy Gueterman and a squad of soldiers, who have mistaken her for Space Beth. Rick, Beth, and Jerry rendezvous with Space Beth, and both Beths become mad at Rick for his refusal to disclose which is the clone. They are again attacked by Tammy, who takes the Beths prisoner and beams them up to the Federation's ship. Morty and Summer intervene and Rick kills Tammy. The family heads to the ship, with Rick going to free the Beths while Morty and Summer shut off its superlaser before it can annihilate Earth. The Beths escape on their own as Rick is confronted by Phoenixperson (a revived Birdperson), who almost kills him (calling him "a bad friend" for having previously wondered which of them would win in a fight) before being shut down by Space Beth (with Jerry's help). In the aftermath, Rick retrieves the memory tube containing his memory of creating the clone Beth, having erased his own knowledge of which Beth is the original. However, no one in the family is interested in learning the truth. Rick watches the memory nonetheless, only to learn that Beth asked him to decide for himself whether he wanted her in his life. He cloned her, then had the two Beths swapped around until he no longer knew which was the original. After admitting to himself that he is "a terrible father," Rick tries to be a good friend instead and fix Phoenixperson (whose remains he retrieved after the battle), only to be aggressively rejected. Rick is left alone and distraught.

==== Season Five ====
In the fifth season finale "Rickmurai Jack", the Citadel's new President Morty destroys the Central Finite Curve, stripping all Ricks of their title of "Smartest Man in the Universe" and freeing the multiverse of his influence.

==== Season Six ====
In the sixth season premiere "Solaricks", after briefly finally tracking down Rick Prime, Rick and the rest of the Smith family switch realities to a near-identical one (where "parmesan" is pronounced /pɑːrˈmiːziən/ par-MEE-zee-ən), after everyone on their previous reality's Earth are absorbed by Mr. Frundles. After achieving a healthier state of mind after talking with his therapist by "Analyze Piss", Rick finally resumes his search for Rick Prime in "A Rick in King Mortur's Mort", before bringing Morty into his search for Rick Prime (on his request) in the finale, "Ricktional Mortpoon's Rickmas Mortcation".

==== Season Seven ====
In the seventh season episode "Unmortricken", with the help of Evil Morty, Rick finally tracks down and kills Rick Prime, though his revenge feels hollow.

=== Comic series ===
Rick C-137 appears as a main character in several Oni Press Rick and Morty comic series story arcs from the third volume onward, after cameoing at the conclusion of "Head-Space, Part Three", as well as the spin-off series Rick and Morty Presents and various limited series.

== Other versions ==
=== Citadel of Ricks and Mortys ===
The Citadel of Ricks and Mortys is an inter-dimensional society populated almost exclusively by alternate versions of Rick and Morty from across the multiverse, founded by Rick C-137, and ruled by the Trans-Dimensional Council of Ricks, and the Shadow Council of Ricks.

==== Pocket Mortys ====
The main plot of Pocket Mortys follows Rick C-123 and his Morty, based on the Citadel, as they embark on a Pokémon-inspired challenge where Rick catches various 'wild' Mortys in other dimensions, battling them with a variety of 'Trainers' in the form of Ricks, aliens, and several supporting characters. Hundreds of Ricks are made available as playable characters in the game, including every Rick to appear in the television/comic series, and numerous original Ricks, including John Rick, from a John Wick-inspired dimension.

=== Doofus Rick ===
"Doofus" Rick of Dimension J-19ζ7 ("Opposite Dimension") is a naive Rick with buck teeth and a bowl cut, who never had a family, and whose Morty, "Eric Stoltz Mask Morty", was assigned to him. Much kinder than most other Ricks, he befriends Season Two Jerry in "Close Rick-counters of the Rick Kind", being mocked by his fellow Ricks for his physical appearance and a rumour that the people of his dimension convert excreta back into food. In the comic series arc A Tale of Two Jerries, "Doofus" Rick is confirmed to be just as intelligent as any other Rick, developing portal fluid which can be used without a gun to return Jerry and himself to the latter's reality to prevent Doofus Rick's own Jerry from conquering the multiverse. In The Rickoning, Doofus Rick and other versions of him are revealed to have taken over the IllumiRicki, planning on taking out Rick C-137 and nearby versions of him so that he and Jerry can be together in peace.

=== Rick C-132 ===
One of the two main protagonists of the first three volumes of the Oni Press Rick and Morty comic series, the Rick of Dimension C-132 uses time crystals to win at the stock market in The Wubba Lubba Dub Dub of Wall Street. In Head-Space, in a parody of Dune, following an alien invasion whose army give themselves up to Morty C-132 due to an ancient prophecy, who becomes the Morty'Dyb, Rick opposes the rule of Morty's galactic empire over the next 180 years as the QuasRick Haderach (designed after the Mad Scientist from Robot Chicken), leading a rebellion against him. At the conclusion of the storyline, both Rick and Morty C-132 are killed, and their universe destroyed, before the arc pivots to Rick C-137 and Morty Prime (the protagonists of the Rick and Morty television series, and most subsequent volumes of the comic series) who had been watching recordings of their memories as a "movie" from within their C-132 counterparts' now-severed heads.

=== Devil Rick ===
In the comic series arc The Rickoning, "just the next universe over from" the one Rick C-137 is currently residing in, the "Worst Rick" kills the IllumiRicki after they drop a universe-destroying bomb into his garage, before himself being killed along with the rest of his universe. After being cured and going with Rick to kill the IllumiRicki, Morty and Rick return in an unsuccessful attempt to deactivate the bomb, which goes off, killing them and destroying their universe. In Rick and Morty Go to Hell, the Rick and Morty of The Rickoning find themselves in Hell; not remembering how they died, Morty proceeds to find the Devil in an attempt to make a deal with him, before Rick unwittingly kills the Devil and takes his place as Devil Rick, using his powers to recreate the universe within Hell, allowing Morty to live a normal life before Rick returns to Hell to reluctantly rule forever.

The Rickoning also features Brick, an alternate version of Rick who runs the inter-dimensional superstore Brick and Mortary with his business partner Mortary, who sell weapons to other Ricks and Mortys, including the Hollaluog, a impregnable suit of armor created by Cold War Arms Race Wizard Rick, as well as Rule 63 Cosplay Rick, also known as Girl Rick, from a dimension where Rick is a woman, whose Morty is a dog, designed after real-life cosplayer Santana Maynard by series writer Kyle Starks.

=== Decoy Ricks ===
In "Mortyplicity", numerous robotic "decoy" versions of the Smith family are revealed to have been built by Rick and spread across America (the real Rick having built a single decoy family, who proceeded to build their own decoys), including numerous versions of Rick who with the rest of his family in an "Asimov cascade" proceed to kill each other, before the real Rick and his family return to Earth.

=== Memory Rick ===
In "Rickternal Friendshine of the Spotless Mort", after Rick enters Birdperson's mind in order to bring back his original trapped mind, Birdperson's memory of a mid-30s Rick, whom Rick names Memory Rick, becomes sentient and joins him on his journey. Only knowing everything Rick had told Birdperson about himself prior to the Battle of Blood Ridge, he is as a result more idealistic than the modern Rick. After attempting to sacrifice himself to save Rick and Birdperson, Memory Rick escapes into Rick's mind when he returns to his body, exploring Rick's childhood. After Rick offers to make provide him a real body, Memory Rick is hesitant due to a fear of becoming more like Rick himself. The sentient memory returns in "The Jerrick Trap", where after Rick's and Jerry's minds end up swapped then merged, Memory Rick fights to free Rick and Jerry offscreen, before returning onscreen in the post-credits scene, revealed to have been trapped in Jerry's mind once Rick and Jerry were finally unmerged, his various attempts to escape failing due to Jerry's belief that all technology is powered by gears and springs preventing Memory Rick from fabricating the device he would need to escape.

=== Miscellaneous ===
Further alternate versions of Rick appear in the web series Rick and Morty: The Non-Canonical Adventures (2016–2021) and the anime series Rick and Morty: The Anime (2024–present), voiced in the latter series by Yōhei Tadano, reprising his role from the Japanese dub of Rick and Morty, with an illusory "Hole Rick" appearing in the seventh season finale "Fear No Mort".

== Appearances ==
=== Television ===
Rick Sanchez is one of the main protagonists of Rick and Morty, voiced by Justin Roiland for the first six seasons, and Ian Cardoni from the seventh season onward.

Rick appears in the couch gag of the 2015 The Simpsons episode "Mathlete's Feat", with Roiland reprising his role.

Rick appears in the claymation web series Rick and Morty: The Non-Canonical Adventures as a silent character.

Rick appears as one of the main protagonists of Rick and Morty: The Anime, voiced by Yōhei Tadano, reprising his role from the Japanese language dub of Rick and Morty.

=== Comics ===
Rick Sanchez is one of the main protagonists of the Oni Press comic series Rick and Morty and the IDW Publishing co-publication Rick and Morty vs. Dungeons & Dragons, and a supporting character in Rick and Morty Presents.

=== Video games ===
Since 2016, Rick and his inter-dimensional counterparts have appeared as playable characters in the video game Pocket Mortys.

In 2021, Rick was added as a playable character in Fortnite Battle Royale as part of the Chapter 2 – Season 7 Battle Pass, in MultiVersus as part of the game's first season, and in the film Space Jam: A New Legacy, with Roiland reprising his role. Roiland was later dubbed over by Ian Cardoni in updates to MultiVersus. Rick Prime was added later as a purchasable Fortnite skin in March 2026.

=== In popular culture ===
In the first episode of the third season, "The Rickshank Redemption", Rick shows a significant interest in the Schezwan sauce that McDonald's carried as part of a tie-in promotion with the Mulan and insists that his motivation in life is "finding that McNugget sauce", causing a public interest in having the sauce reinstated on the McDonald's menu, with some fans attempting to recreate the sauce themselves. According to USA Today, McDonald's spokesperson Terri Hickey stated that "We never say never, because when our customers speak, we listen. And to paraphrase some of our most enthusiastic fans, our sauce is so good that it would be worth waiting 9 seasons or 97 years for."

In March 2019, Godzilla: King of the Monsters director Michael Dougherty confirmed the character of Monarch crypto-sonographer Dr. Rick Stanton, played by Bradley Whitford, was based on Rick Sanchez from Rick and Morty, with Dougherty having the character "drink a lot" to keep the character in line with the spirit of Sanchez.

== Personality ==
In the pilot, he was revealed to be an atheist, as he tells Summer that "there is no God"; however, Rick is later established to be aware of the existence of various afterlives and gods, just lacking respect for them. Harmon has said that "anarchist" is a close ideological descriptor of Rick.

One of the show's creators and executive producers and voice actor Justin Roiland revealed Sanchez was pansexual. This was shown in "Auto Erotic Assimilation", when Rick re-connects with Unity, an ex-lover who is a collective hive mind of assimilated individuals from the planet they occupy. The episode "Rickternal Friendshine of the Spotless Mort" reveals Rick had feelings for his best friend Birdperson, and confessed his feelings for him in the hopes they'd travel the multiverse together. However, Birdperson turned him down, causing the two to become distant. Rick is speculated to be a neurodivergent person, a theory supported by his question to Morty about whether Minecraft is suitable for autistic people, since Rick is "starting to love it".

Rick is further shown to be attracted to planets in the Oni Press comic series backup story "Rick and Morty in: The Most Important Lesson", and furthermore established to be attracted to sentient planets — which later serves as the basis for the fourth season episode "Childrick of Mort", where Rick re-connects with ex-lover Gaia, a planet, whom he met on a "Planets Only" dating website.

It is revealed that Rick is afraid of pirates in the season 3 episode "The Rickchurian Mortydate". It is also noted that the only thing that can stop Rick is a rare element known as "Sanchezium". It is later revealed that this element does not exist, and that someone, likely Rick, added this misinformation to Wikipedia.

== Development ==
The character was created by Justin Roiland and Dan Harmon, who first met at Channel 101 in the early 2000s. In 2006, Roiland created The Real Animated Adventures of Doc and Mharti, an animated short parodying the Back to the Future characters Emmett "Doc" Brown and Marty McFly, and the precursor to Rick and Morty. The idea for Rick and Morty, in the form of Doc and Mharti was brought up to Adult Swim, and the ideas for a family element and Rick being a grandfather to Morty were developed. Rick was voiced by Justin Roiland for the first six seasons of Rick and Morty and promotional material, Roiland considering his voice for Rick to be a "horrible Doc Brown manic impression", "I was having fun doing these really crappy Doc Brown and Marty McFly impressions. During the middle of a line a burp came out naturally," said Roiland, addressing the creation of Rick's ubiquitous burping habit.

Addressing Roiland's and his own portrayals of Rick in a series of promotional interstitials (directed by Paul B. Cummings) compared to Doc Brown, Christopher Lloyd stated "that he felt like Doc and Rick were like two brothers that took different paths".

== Reception ==
The character has received a positive reception. Speaking of Rick's relatability and likability, Dan Harmon stated that "we've all been Rick. But Rick really does have bigger fish to fry than anybody. He understands everything better than us. So you give him the right to be jaded and dismissive and narcissistic and sociopathic". Emily Gaudette of Inverse wrote that fans have "come to love [Rick] over two seasons of misadventures".

David Sims of The Atlantic noted Rick's "bitter amorality" and called the character "a genius who comfortably thinks of himself as the universe's cleverest man and is grounded only by his empathy toward other people, which he tries to suppress as much as possible", therefore writing that Rick's selflessness at the end of the episode "The Wedding Squanchers" is "the most surprising twist possible". Zack Handlen of The A.V. Club wrote that "[Rick] slowly realizing that he loved his grandkids and his daughter (and tolerated his son-in-law), no matter how many times he swore at them, helped to give the character some necessary depth", and that "behind all the catchphrases and the crazed energy … [t]here's something dead and sad and fucked up in the guy".
