= Harry Belden =

American actor

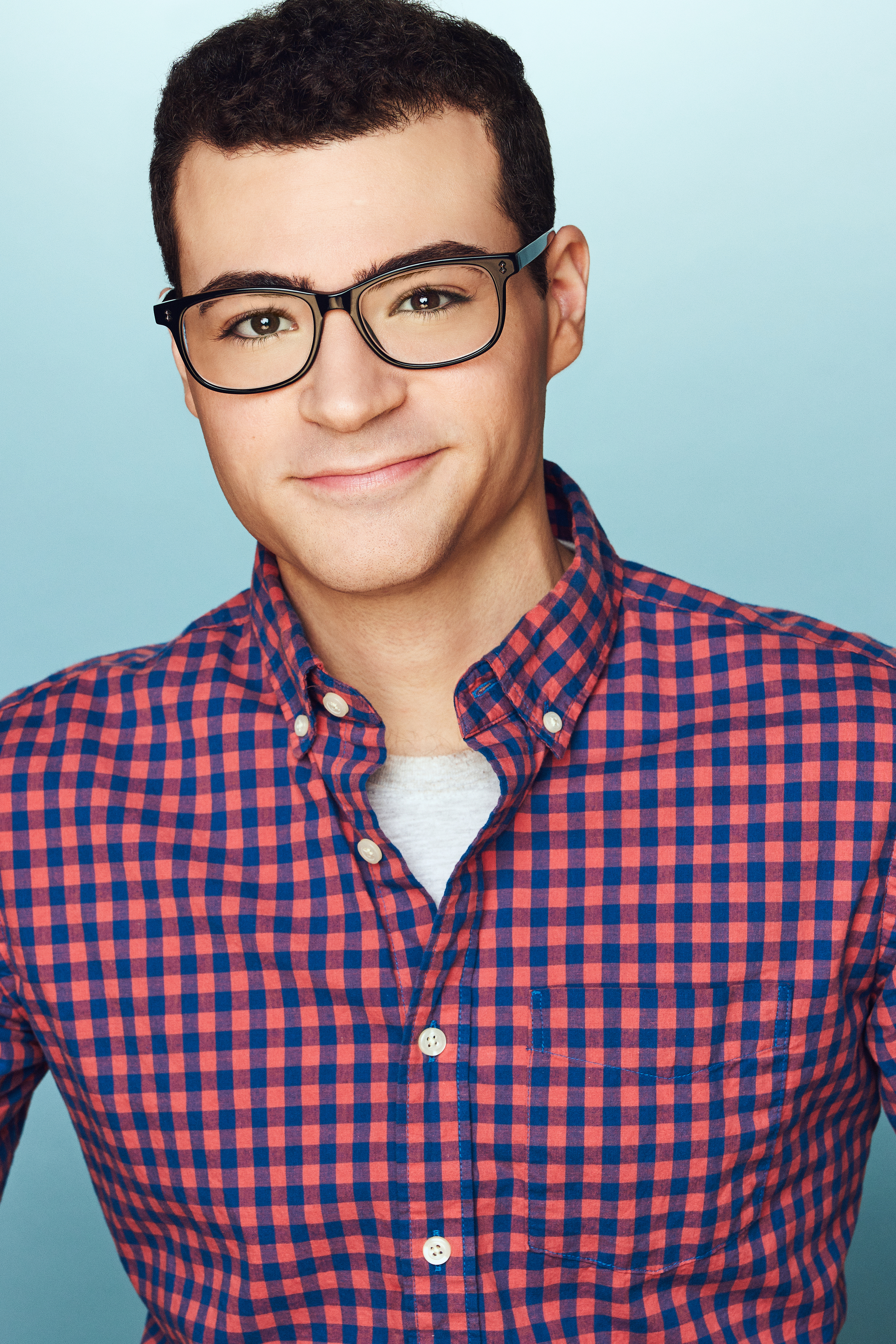
- Belden in 2022
- Born: Chicago, Illinois, U.S.
- Education: University of Illinois Urbana-Champaign
- Occupation: Actor
- Years active: 2017–present
- Known for: Morty Smith in Rick and Morty
- Website: www.harrybelden.com

Harry Belden is an American actor. He has voiced Morty Smith and Evil Morty in the Adult Swim animated television series Rick and Morty since season 7.

== Early life ==
Belden was born and raised in Chicago, Illinois. He attended the University of Illinois Urbana-Champaign and graduated with a Bachelor of Fine Arts in Acting in 2017.

== Career ==
Belden began his career in 2017, working on various projects in Chicago including theater, commercials, and voice over. In 2023, he was cast as the voice of Morty Smith in the animated series Rick and Morty following the dismissal of Morty's original voice actor Justin Roiland, beginning in the show's seventh season.

== Filmography ==
=== Television ===
Year	Title	Role(s)	Notes
2019	Proven Innocent	Marco	Episode: "The Burden of Truth"
2020	Chicago Med	Kyle Henderson	Episode: "The Ground Shifts Beneath Us"
2021	Joe Pera Talks with You	Security Guard	Episode: "Joe Pera Discusses School-Appropriate Entertainment With You"
2021	Christmas...Again?!	Will	Television film
2023–present	Rick and Morty	Morty Smith, Evil Morty	Main cast
2026	President Curtis	Morty Smith	Episode: "Pilot"

=== Video games ===
Year	Title	Role(s)	Notes
2024	MultiVersus	Morty Smith, Evil Morty	
2026	Call of Duty: Modern Warfare 4	Additional voices	

=== Theater ===
Year	Title	Role(s)	Theatre	Notes
2019	The King's Speech	Footman	Chicago Shakespeare Theater/US Tour	Understudy
2021	L'elisir d'amore	Barman	Lyric Opera of Chicago	
2022	Le Comte Ory	Mechanical	Lyric Opera of Chicago	Understudy
2022	Fiddler on the Roof	Villager/Russian Soldier	Lyric Opera of Chicago	
2023	Hansel and Gretel	Chef	Lyric Opera of Chicago	
2023	Dory Fantasmagory	Luke/Mr. Nuggy	Young People's Theatre of Chicago	Understudy
