= Ian Cardoni =

American actor

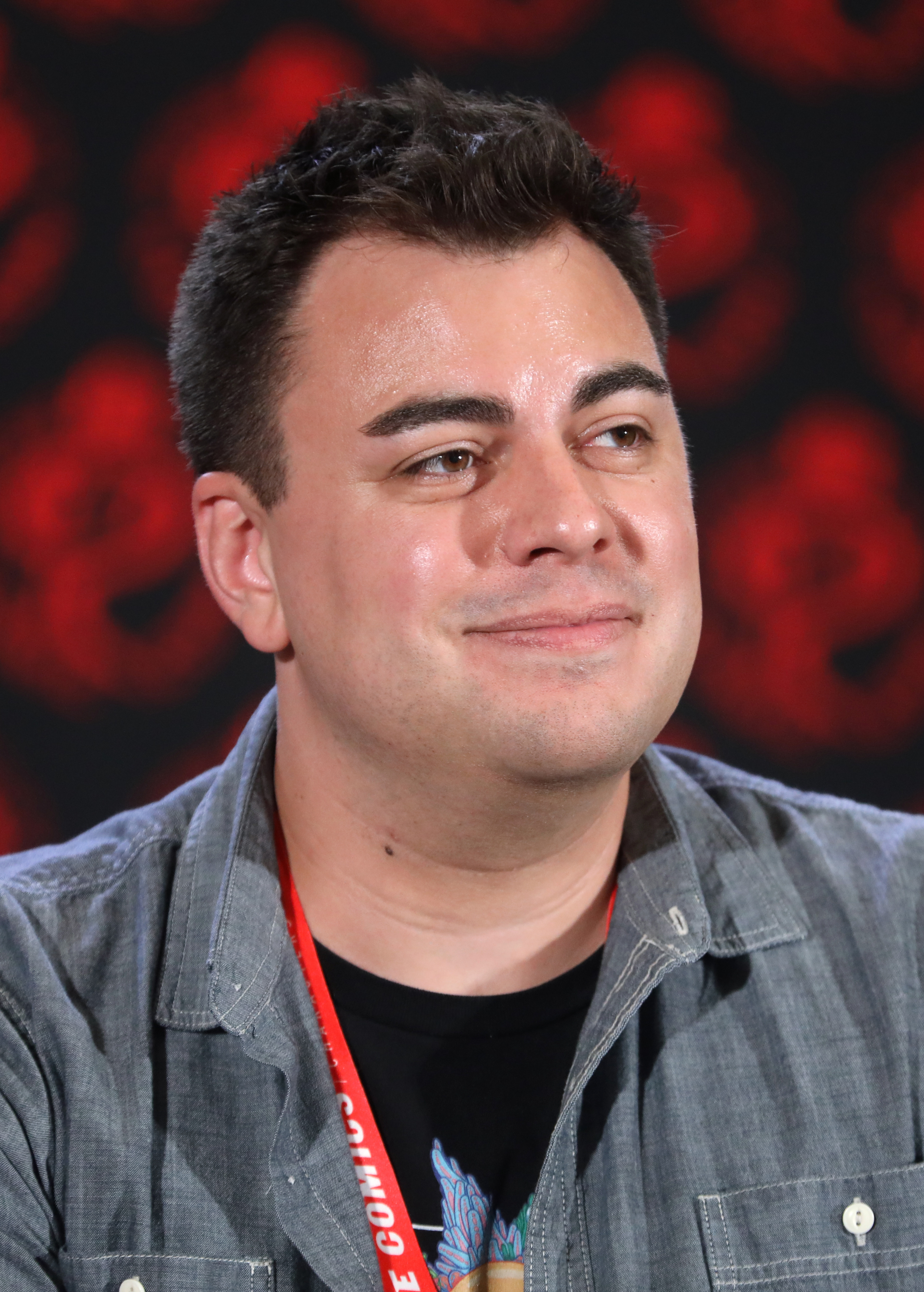
- Cardoni in 2024
- Born: June 12, 1990 (age 36); Boston, Massachusetts. U.S.
- Education: Emerson College
- Occupation: Actor
- Years active: 2023–present
- Known for: Rick Sanchez in Rick and Morty

Ian Cardoni is an American voice actor. He has voiced Rick Sanchez and the character's variations in Adult Swim animated television series Rick and Morty since season 7.

== Early life ==
Cardoni was born in Boston, Massachusetts. He graduated from Emerson College.

== Career ==
Following the dismissal of Rick and Morty co-creator Justin Roiland in 2023 due to allegations of domestic violence, Cardoni replaced Roiland as the voice of Rick Sanchez from the seventh season onwards. Cardoni had previously been a fan of the show, having been "watching since the early days."

Cardoni has also recorded promo voiceovers for WWE and SyFy.

== Filmography ==
=== Television ===
Year	Title	Role(s)	Notes
2020–21	WrestleMania	Jack Sparrow Narrator	voice role; 36, 37
2020	Dead of Night	Male 1	role; one episode
2023–present	Rick and Morty	Rick Sanchez, other assorted Ricks	main role
2025	Krapopolis	Dave	
2025–26	Rock Paper Scissors	Various roles	2 episodes
2026	President Curtis	Rick Sanchez	Episode: "Pilot"

=== Film ===
Year	Title	Role	Notes
2025	Scarlet	Rosencrantz	voice role

=== Video games ===
Year	Title	Role(s)
2023	Cookie Run: The Darkest Night	Lava Toad
2024	MultiVersus	Rick Sanchez
2025	DC: Dark Legion	Riddler
2025	Tony Hawk's Pro Skater 3 + 4	Additional Voices
2026	Romeo is a Dead Man	Magrus

=== Podcasts ===
Year	Title	Role	Notes
2026	Simpsons Declassified with Nancy Cartwright	Himself	Episode: Ian Cardoni: Becoming Rick Sanchez, Burp Battles & Multiverse Madness”
