= M. Night Shaym-Aliens! =

- Rick and Morty episode
- Episode no.: Season 1 Episode 4
- Directed by: Jeff Myers
- Written by: Tom Kauffman
- Original air date: January 13, 2014
- Running time: 22 minutes

Guest appearances
- Dan Harmon as Kevin; as Mr. Marklovich; Kari Wahlgren as Cynthia; as Jessica; Brandon Johnson as Mr. Goldenfold; David Cross as Nebulon

Episode chronology
← Previous "Anatomy Park"	Next → "Meeseeks and Destroy"
- Rick and Morty season 1

"M. Night Shaym-Aliens!" is the fourth episode of the first season of the American science fiction television series Rick and Morty. Directed by Jeff Myers and written by Tom Kauffman, the episode was aired on January 13, 2014. It stars Justin Roiland as both titular characters, Rick Sanchez and Morty Smith, Chris Parnell as Jerry Smith, and Sarah Chalke as Beth Smith. Summer Smith, a series regular voiced by Spencer Grammer, does not appear in the episode.

The title of the episode is a reference to Indian-American filmmaker M. Night Shyamalan and his penchant for twist endings. The episode received positive reviews from critics upon its premiere.

== Plot ==
Aliens hold Rick and Jerry captive in a virtual reality, in an attempt to steal Rick's recipe for Concentrated Dark Matter, which would allow them to travel at higher speeds in outer space. As Rick repeatedly attempts escape with Morty (later revealed to be a simulation), he discovers that there are multiple virtual realities layered on top of each other; each simulation's version of the aliens running the "lower" simulation. In contrast, Jerry—despite numerous system glitches—remains completely oblivious, and continually attempts to sell his advertising slogan for apples. Rick finally outsmarts the aliens by giving them a fake recipe, who send Rick and Jerry back to Earth. Their ship explodes as they prepare the concoction.

In a post-credits scene, Jerry is fired on the spot after debuting his new advertising slogan in the real world. At night, a drunk Rick enters Morty's room and threatens him with a knife, demanding to know if Morty is a simulation. His earnest terror convinces Rick of his innocence, and Rick apologizes before passing out.

== Reception ==
=== Ratings ===
Upon its airdate, the episode was watched by 1.32 million American viewers.

=== Critical response ===
The first season has an approval rating of 96% on Rotten Tomatoes based on 28 reviews, with an average rating of 8.19 out of 10. The site's critics consensus reads, "Rick and Morty zaps onto screens and makes an instant impression with its vivid splashes of color, improvisational voice acting, and densely-plotted science fiction escapades -- bringing a surprising amount of heart to a cosmically heartless premise." Joe Matar of Den of Geek praised the role Jerry's character had in the episode, saying "This episode manages to give a good bit of insight into what an utter sad sack Jerry is that his best day ever took place in a low-functioning simulation. It's nice to see an episode give over a significant portion of its focus to another member of Rick and Morty's family and for it to hold up as well as the main, crazy, action-y, sci-fi portion."

Zack Handlen of The A.V. Club also commented on Jerry's appearances, saying "Jerry's story, in which the schlub manages to have the best day of his life inside a simulation operating at five percent processing speed, isn't the same kind of entertaining, but it fits the character well. The mix of dark, existential comedy (Jerry is so pathetic that sex with a duplicate of his wife that doesn't even take off its clothes or move is somehow the best sex of his life) and computer glitch jokes works well, and it's impressive to watch such a complex balance of reference and humor still manage to be character-based." Corey Plante of Inverse wrote that "[t]his horrific, tenuous push and pull of intimacy mixed with malignant alcoholism and abuse pervades throughout the entire show as one of its defining features, and nowhere is it more firmly established than in 'M. Night Shaym-Aliens!' But when it comes to the sci-fi gimmicks, they're all better used in future episodes."
