= Rixty Minutes =

- Rick and Morty episode
- Episode no.: Season 1 Episode 8
- Directed by: Bryan Newton
- Written by: Tom Kauffman; Justin Roiland
- Original air date: March 17, 2014
- Running time: 22 minutes

Episode chronology
← Previous "Raising Gazorpazorp"	Next → "Something Ricked This Way Comes"
- Rick and Morty (season 1)

"Rixty Minutes" is the eighth episode of the first season of Rick and Morty. It premiered on Adult Swim on March 17, 2014. The episode was written by Tom Kauffman and Justin Roiland, and directed by Bryan Newton. In the episode, Rick and Morty watch cable from other dimensions, while Jerry, Beth, and Summer watch alternate reality versions of themselves using a pair of interdimensional goggles. The episode was well received by critics, and it was watched by about 1.48 million viewers in the United States.

The title and episode premise are based off the television news magazine program 60 Minutes.

== Plot ==
Rick expresses his disgust for the quality of modern television, and replaces the Smith family's normal cable box with a device that allows them to watch shows from infinite realities. Rick flips through the channels to show the endless possibilities, including a reality where Jerry is a famous actor. Jerry, Beth, and Summer, excited, beg Rick to show them their alternate lives. He pulls out a pair of Inter-Dimensional Goggles that will allow them to see through the eyes of their alternate selves. Morty stays with Rick and the two continue to watch various commercials and clips from alternate realities.

Jerry, Beth and Summer take turns using the goggles. Jerry sees himself snorting piles of cocaine with Johnny Depp, while Beth sees herself operating on a person instead of a horse. Summer, however, finds that she does not exist in most realities, with those she exists in being largely unchanged. Jerry and Beth confess to Summer that she was an unwanted pregnancy that they initially were going to abort, and that her birth prevented them from achieving their goals. This greatly upsets Summer, and she announces her plans to run away.

While Summer begins to pack her bags, Morty attempts to console her. He shows Summer the graves that he and Rick dug in their backyard in the episode "Rick Potion No. 9", confessing that the Morty from her reality is dead, and he is her brother from another reality. He then concludes by saying "Nobody exists on purpose, nobody belongs anywhere, everybody's gonna die... Come watch TV?" Summer agrees to stay, and the two of them go back downstairs to watch TV with Rick.

Jerry returns to the living room and tells Morty that he and Beth have decided to spend some time apart. The television suddenly shows the alternate reality Jerry having a nervous breakdown, driving a mobility scooter on a freeway in a "low-speed chase" by police. They watch as alternate Jerry arrives at the doorstep of alternate Beth, telling her that he hates his life and regrets not continuing their relationship. Having seen how important their relationship is to each other, Beth and Jerry rush back into each other's arms.

In the post-credit sequence, the Smith family is watching the news from a "Hamster-in-Butt World". They ask Rick a wide variety of questions about the world until he begrudgingly creates a portal to it so they can find the answers for themselves. The family then spends a pleasant vacation in Hamster-In-Butt World.

== Reception ==
"Rixty Minutes" has received high praise since its release, and it has since been referred to as one of the best episodes of the entire series. Matt Fowler of IGN gave the episode an 8.8 out of 10, saying, "It's been a while since an animated series truly entertained like this one has – not sacrificing humor for strangeness, but integrating them together perfectly." Zack Handlen of The A.V. Club gave the episode an A, and says "In case my review did not make it clear, this episode pretty much blew me away." Stacy Taylor of Geek Syndicate gave the episode a 5/5, and said that "‘Rixty Minutes’ is, without a shadow of a doubt, as close to a perfect 20 minutes of television as I think we may ever get." Den of Geek gave the episode a 3.5/5, with Joe Matar saying much of the episode "is effectively the same kind of stuff, turning a lot of the episode into a weird sketch show. But, as with all sketch shows (especially improvised ones), the output is hit or miss."
