= Anatomy Park =

- Rick and Morty episode
- Episode no.: Season 1 Episode 3
- Directed by: John Rice
- Written by: Eric Acosta; Wade Randolph
- Original air date: December 16, 2013
- Running time: 22 minutes

Guest appearances
- Kari Wahlgren as Jessica; Gary Anthony Williams as Poncho / Bill the News Anchor; Dana Carvey as Leonard Smith; John Oliver as Xenon Bloom; Dan Benson as Ethan; Patricia Lentz as Joyce Smith; Echo Kellum as Jacob Philip; Jess Harnell as Ruben; Jackie Buscarino as Annie

Episode chronology
← Previous "Lawnmower Dog"	Next → "M. Night Shaym-Aliens!"
- Rick and Morty season 1

"Anatomy Park" is the third episode of the first season of the American science fiction television series Rick and Morty. Written by Eric Acosta and Wade Randolph and directed by John Rice, the episode aired on December 16, 2013, and is a parody of both the 1966 film Fantastic Voyage and the Jurassic Park franchise.

The episode was released along with the other 10 in Rick and Morty season one on DVD and Blu-ray on October 7, 2014. "Anatomy Park" stars series creator Justin Roiland as both titular characters, Rick Sanchez and Morty Smith. Chris Parnell voices Jerry Smith, Sarah Chalke voices Beth Smith, and Spencer Grammer voices Summer Smith.

== Plot ==
On Christmas, Rick shrinks Morty and sends him inside the body of a homeless man named Reuben, once a doctor, to save his life. Inside Reuben's body is Anatomy Park (a parody of both Jurassic Park and Disneyland), which houses various deadly diseases that escape their enclosures. Morty meets the park staff, Poncho, Alexander, Annie and their leader Dr. Xenon Bloom. After fleeing from gonorrhea to the lungs, they discover that Reuben is suffering from tuberculosis but he dies just before Rick can cure him. Together they flee from the rampaging diseases and dangers, which results in Alexander's death while Annie eventually falls for Morty. They discover that Poncho betrayed them by giving Reuben the tuberculosis, and he is killed by bubonic plague. Morty tells them to get to Reuben's right nipple, and Dr. Bloom is devoured by E. coli bacteria operating a train for Morty and Annie to escape. Rick ultimately rescues Morty and Annie by enlarging Reuben's body to the size of the contiguous United States before detonating the body. Annie, Rick and Morty return to Earth, and Rick shrinks Annie for a future experiment.

Meanwhile, at the family home, Jerry's parents visit along with a man named Jacob, and the family tries to bond without electronic devices at his demand. At lunch, Jerry is dismayed to discover his parents have been engaging in polyamory with Jacob, and soon comes to regret his wish for an electronic-free bonding. Summer's boyfriend Ethan makes an appearance, enraged over her digital absence, and they fight briefly before reconciling with Jacob's help. Suddenly, blood from Reuben's remains rains from the sky, enveloping the outdoors. Rick and Morty return to the living room, and Rick berates the family for engrossing themselves in their electronics on Christmas.

In a post-credits scene, Rick contacts Annie and her new associates inside his new patient's body in hopes of recreating Anatomy Park. He hangs up in frustration after one member insults the concept of his ride, and the patient is revealed to be Summer's boyfriend, Ethan who then asks if he'll still be paid.

== Reception ==
=== Viewing figures ===
Upon its airing, the episode was viewed by 1.30 million American viewers.

=== Critical response ===
The first season has an approval rating of 96% on Rotten Tomatoes based on 28 reviews, with an average rating of 8.19 out of 10. The site's critics consensus reads, "Rick and Morty zaps onto screens and makes an instant impression with its vivid splashes of color, improvisational voice acting, and densely-plotted science fiction escapades -- bringing a surprising amount of heart to a cosmically heartless premise."

The A.V. Club praised the episode's B-story of Jerry's parents, Leonard and Joyce coming to town and revealing they are in a throuple with a young man named Jacob, much to Jerry's dismay, however the review criticized the Annie character, saying "Morty's brief affair with Annie is a weird bit that isn't really funny enough to justify the time spent on it; she's barely a character until the very end (when it she becomes interesting just long enough for Rick to shrink her again), and her shift from "vague contempt" to "intense sexual longing" is just kind of odd."
