= Meeseeks and Destroy =

- Rick and Morty episode
- Episode no.: Season 1 Episode 5
- Directed by: Bryan Newton
- Written by: Ryan Ridley
- Original air date: January 20, 2014
- Running time: 21 minutes

Guest appearance
- Tom Kenny as Mr. Jellybean

Episode chronology
← Previous "M. Night Shaym-Aliens!"	Next → "Rick Potion #9"
- Rick and Morty season 1

"Meeseeks and Destroy" is the fifth episode of the first season of Rick and Morty. It premiered on Adult Swim on January 20, 2014. The episode was written by Ryan Ridley and directed by Bryan Newton. In the episode, Rick provides the family with a solution to their problems, freeing him up to go on an adventure led by Morty. The episode received largely positive reviews from critics, many of whom regard it as one of the series' best episodes. It was seen by about 1.6 million viewers when it was first aired on Adult Swim. The Title of the episode is a reference to the 1983 song "Seek & Destroy" by the heavy metal band Metallica.

== Plot ==
After a traumatic adventure, Morty strikes a bet with Rick to lead one of his own. When the other Smiths ask Rick for solutions to their mundane problems, he gives them a Meeseeks Box: a gadget capable of summoning blue humanoids all named "Mr. Meeseeks", who live until executing the task they're given, and then vanish. Rick warns the family to keep their tasks simple.

Jerry summons a Meeseeks to take two strokes off his golf game, but struggles. The frustrated creature summons another Meeseeks for help. Soon, Jerry is surrounded by many Meeseeks, yet still cannot improve. Giving up, he and Beth go to dinner together despite the Meeseeks' protests. The desperate Meeseeks brawl amongst themselves before concluding that their only hope is to kill Jerry (thus taking all strokes off his game).

A horde of Meeseeks storm the restaurant, taking hostages to coax Jerry out of hiding. Beth convinces him to try his golf swing one last time. Jerry uses a pipe and tomato to demonstrate that his game has improved, and the Meeseeks disappear.

Concurrently, Rick and Morty arrive in a poor village in a medieval fantasy world, who request their help to steal a giant's treasure in order to raise money. They climb up a giant beanstalk to the giants' world, but a fatal accident sees them arrested for "murdering" him. They are tried in a Giant's Court, but are acquitted via technicality.

The duo stop at a tavern, and Morty heads to the bathroom after berating Rick for his constant pessimism. There, an initially gregarious Mr. Jellybean attempts to rape him whom Morty fights off, but left visibly shaken. Meanwhile, Rick wins a sizable amount of money from playing cards. Morty begs Rick to go home, admitting to losing the bet. Rick quickly notices Morty's situation with Jellybean and offers to give the money to the villagers. The villagers declare the duo heroes and ask them to meet their king who happens to be Mr. Jellybean. Morty immediately tells Rick to open a portal to leave. The two leave, and Rick shoots and kills Jellybean through the portal as retribution.

In a post-credits scene, two villagers find incriminating photographs in King Jellybean's lockbox, but they burn it to keep the king's legacy untainted. The camera pans out, revealing a statue of Mr. Jellybean massaging the shoulders of a young child—reminiscent of his assault on Morty.

== Development ==
Justin Roiland claimed the idea for the episode occurred when, frustrated with the progress of a writing session, he suggested the introduction of a character blurting "I'm Mister Meeseeks, look at me!" and the concept evolved from there.

== Reception ==
Zach Handlen of The A.V. Club rated the episode A−, quoting that it "[may have had] the most weirdly upbeat ending of the show so far". David Roa from Dead Screen gave the episode 9.1 out of 10, noting its great story and re-watchability. Junkie Monkey's gave it a mixed review, stating that although it wasn't the best episode of the season, it was far from the worst. Den of Geek gave the episode a 5/5 rating, reviewer Joe Matar said that the episode was a good challenge of the concept of adventure.
