= Rick and Morty season 1 =

Rick and Morty
- Season 1
- Blu-ray cover
- Showrunners: Dan Harmon; Justin Roiland
- Starring: Justin Roiland; Chris Parnell; Spencer Grammer; Sarah Chalke
- No. of episodes: 11

Release
- Original network: Adult Swim
- Original release: December 2, 2013 – April 14, 2014

Season chronology
- Next → Season 2

The first season of the American animated television series, Rick and Morty originally aired in the United States on Cartoon Network's late night programming block, Adult Swim. It premiered on December 2, 2013 with "Pilot" and ended on April 14, 2014 with "Ricksy Business", with a total of eleven episodes (including the pilot episode). The first season received critical acclaim.

== Cast and characters ==
=== Main cast ===
- Justin Roiland as Rick Sanchez C-137 and Morty Smith Prime, the two main characters of the show; Rick is an eccentric mad scientist and Morty is his kind but easily distressed grandson.
- Chris Parnell as Jerry Smith Prime and Jerry Smith C-131, Rick's son-in-law and Morty's father; a simple-minded and insecure person, who disapproves of Rick's influence over his family.
- Spencer Grammer as Summer Smith Prime and Summer Smith C-131, Rick's granddaughter and Morty's sister; a conventional teenager who worries about improving her status among her peers.
- Sarah Chalke as Beth Smith Prime and Beth Smith C-131, Rick's daughter and Morty's mother; a generally level-headed person, who is dissatisfied with her marriage.

=== Guest cast ===
- Kari Wahlgren as Jessica, Morty's classmate and crush.
- Dana Carvey as Leonard Smith, Jerry's father.
- John Oliver as Dr. Xenon Bloom, an amoeba and co-founder of the Anatomy Park.
- David Cross as Prince Nebulon, the alien leader of the Zigerions.
- Claudia Black as Ma-Sha, ruler of the planet Gazorpazorp.
- Richard Christy as a stone floating head controlled by female Gazorpians.
- Virginia Hey as a female Gazorpian inside the stone floating head.
- Alfred Molina as Lucius Needful, the Devil and owner of a vintage antique shop.
- Maurice LaMarche as Abradolf Lincler, a human hybrid with the mixed DNA of Adolf Hitler and Abraham Lincoln.
- Aislinn Paul as Nancy, Summer's unpopular classmate.
- Cassie Steele as Tammy, Summer's friend from school.

=== Other cast members ===
Other cast members of the season, who each have voiced one or more characters, include: Eric Bauza, Dan Harmon, Phil Hendrie, Brandon Johnson, Ryan Ridley, Melique Berger, Jess Harnell, Smith Harrison, Maurice LaMarche, Rob Paulsen, Jesse Mendel, Dan Benson, Jackie Buscarino, Echo Kellum, Patricia Lentz, Rob Schrab, Gary Anthony Williams, Steve Agee, Tom Kenny, Vatche Panos, Cree Summer, Reagan Gomez, Megan Adams, Will Jennings, Finnegan Perry, Jeff Bergman, Adam Ray, Scott Chernoff, Rich Fulcher, Tress MacNeille, Nolan North, Alejandra Gollas, Lauren Hillman and Chris Romano.

== Episodes ==
No. overall	No. in season	Title	Directed by	Written by	Original release date	U.S. viewers (millions)
1	1	"Pilot"	Justin Roiland	Dan Harmon & Justin Roiland	December 2, 2013	1.10
Rick, in a drunken state, takes his grandson, Morty, for a ride in his flying car and rambles on about how he plans to use a neutrino bomb to wipe out all life on Earth. Rick lands the vehicle on Morty's demand and passes out. The bomb activates by itself and seems to be left unchecked, but ultimately it is shown that life on Earth remains intact. After having breakfast with their family, Rick takes Morty to another dimension to collect seeds of "Mega Trees", which Morty is forced to hide in his own rectum to get past intergalactic customs. However, Rick and Morty's cover is blown and they escape while engaging in a shootout with alien insect soldiers. Ultimately, the seeds briefly cause Morty to be highly intelligent, despite the fact that he missed a semester of school because he's been in adventures with Rick. This causes his parents to believe he is fine with his education, but this wastes the seeds, so Rick informs Morty that they need to go back and get more, while their aftereffects leave Morty writhing on the floor.
2	2	"Lawnmower Dog"	John Rice	Ryan Ridley	December 9, 2013	1.51
On Jerry's demand, Rick gives Snuffles, the family dog, an intelligence-enhancing helmet. Rick and Morty, in an Inception-esque scenario, enter the dream of Morty's teacher, in an attempt to make him give Morty an "A" in math class. They find themselves in a dangerous situation, where they are forced to repeatedly enter dreams within dreams to escape. Eventually, they are chased by a dream character named Scary Terry, a "legally safe" parody of Freddy Krueger. They manage to enter his dream, where they stand up for him against his bully teacher. This persuades Scary Terry to help them complete their mission. Meanwhile, at home, Snuffles builds a mechanical suit and assembles a dog army intending to take over Earth. Returning home from their adventure, Rick and Morty enter Snuffles' dream, where Rick causes Morty to fall into a coma. This prompts Snuffles to rethink his priorities, resulting in him taking his army to another planet. Post-credits scene: Back in Scary Terry's class, the old teacher has been replaced by Scary Glenn, a hippie drum player. Rick and Scary Terry are sitting as his students, smoking marijuana, satisfied with this change.
3	3	"Anatomy Park"	John Rice	Eric Acosta & Wade Randolph	December 16, 2013	1.30
On Christmas, Rick sends Morty inside the body of a homeless man to save his life (a parody of Fantastic Voyage). Inside the man's body is a microscopic enclosure called Anatomy Park (a parody of Jurassic Park), which houses various deadly diseases that escape their enclosures. Morty and one of the park staff, Annie, flee from the rampaging diseases as they kill the rest of the base staff. Rick rescues them by enlarging the homeless man's body to the width of the US before destroying it in an explosion. Back at the family home, Jerry's parents visit, and the family attempts to bond without electronic devices. Jerry is dismayed to discover his parents have decided to try polyamory. Post-credits scene: Rick contacts Annie and her other new associates inside his new patient's body and as they talk about his "Pirates of the Pancreas" ride (much to Rick's dislike, since he is sensitive about his ride because it's his idea). Rick hangs up on them only to proceed with a rant and insults, also revealing Summer's boyfriend Ethan as the new Anatomy Park host.
4	4	"M. Night Shaym-Aliens!"	Jeff Myers	Tom Kauffman	January 13, 2014	1.32
Aliens hold Rick and Jerry captive in a virtual reality, in an attempt to steal Rick's recipe for Concentrated Dark Matter. As Rick attempts escape, he discovers that there are multiple virtual reality layers on top of each other. Jerry, on the other hand, despite numerous system glitches, remains completely oblivious, and keeps trying to sell his advertising slogan for apples. Rick finally games the aliens by giving them a fake recipe. The aliens send Rick and Jerry on their way, and their ship explodes as they prepare the concoction. Post-credits scene: Jerry is fired on the spot after debuting his new advertising slogan for apples in the real world. At night, a drunk Rick enters Morty's room, starts showing appreciation for him, but quickly turns on him with a knife and demands to know if Morty is a simulation. Rick then apologizes before passing out.
5	5	"Meeseeks and Destroy"	Bryan Newton	Ryan Ridley	January 20, 2014	1.61
After killing deadly enemies in an alternative dimension, Morty complains that Rick's adventures are too dangerous and traumatizing. This leads them into a "Jack and the Beanstalk" type adventure, where Morty is in charge. He decides to steal the giant's treasure and give it to the villagers. The giant dies by accident, Rick and Morty are charged with murder but are ultimately acquitted. Rick and Morty then descend from the Giants' beanstalk realm and stop in a fairy tale pub on the way down. There, King Jellybean attempts to rape Morty, but Morty escapes. Rick wins money playing poker and gives it to the villagers. As Rick and Morty are leaving this dimension, Rick kills King Jellybean, having figured out his attempted rape of Morty. Meanwhile, Beth, Summer and Jerry use Rick's "Meeseeks Box" to spawn Meeseeks, blue creatures that fulfill one request and then explode. Jerry summons one Meeseeks to help him improve his golf game, and spends some time training, to no avail. The Meeseeks summons more of them to help, resulting in a increasingly larger crowd of frustrated Meeseeks. They decide to kill Jerry, but given one last chance, he ultimately demonstrates that his skills actually have improved and the Meeseeks are happy to disappear. Post-credits scene: Two villagers find a box of incriminating photographs belonging to King Jellybean, which they burn to preserve the king's legacy as a benevolent ruler.
6	6	"Rick Potion #9"	Stephen Sandoval	Justin Roiland	January 27, 2014	1.75
Morty is interested in going to the dance at his school with his classmate Jessica, so he asks Rick for a love potion. However, because Jessica has the flu, the potion becomes airborne and goes haywire, causing not only her but the whole population of Earth to fall for Morty save for blood relatives. Rick attempts to fix up an antidote, but he fails twice, ultimately causing all humans affected by the love potion to turn into mutated monsters called "Cronenbergs" (a reference to famous director of body horror films David Cronenberg). Meanwhile, Jerry visits Beth in her workplace because he is concerned about her fidelity, and they find Summer later. Rick and Morty then migrate to another dimension where their duplicates died soon after successfully curing all of Earth, thus allowing Rick and Morty to assume their roles. Post-credits scene: Jerry, Beth and Summer are happy to stay together as the only normal human family in their post-apocalyptic mutated world, glad that Rick and Morty are gone. Two Cronenberg versions of Rick and Morty come from the "Cronenberg world" to live there as well, because their home was inhabited by Cronenbergs all along, which were accidentally transformed into normal people.
7	7	"Raising Gazorpazorp"	Jeff Myers	Eric Acosta & Wade Randolph	March 10, 2014	1.76
In a pawn shop in space, Rick buys Morty a sex robot. Soon after, the robot conceives Morty's alien hybrid child whom he names Morty Jr. Rick and Summer go to the sex robot's planet of origin, Gazorpazorp, to find better suited parents for Morty Jr. After discovering that the Gazorpazorpian females are the dominant gender on the planet, Rick and Summer learn that the males of this species mature in only days and are, by nature, extremely violent. The Gazorpazorpian females arrest Rick due to his open misogyny and threaten to execute both him and Summer until Summer reveals her fashionable top was made by a man, convincing them to let them go free. Meanwhile, Morty Jr.'s quick aging puts pressure on Morty to try and raise him. Fearing his aggressive instincts, Morty keeps Morty Jr. inside by telling him the air outside is poisonous. However, the isolation causes Morty Jr. to become rebellious. When he realizes Morty lied to him about the air, he gets into a fight with Morty until Rick arrives and prepares to kill Morty Jr. Morty steps in the way of Rick's weapon, telling him he still loves Morty Jr. Morty Jr. decides to move out and live on his own while channeling his aggression into a creative art. Post-credits scene: Morty Jr. goes to a talk show to talk about a book he wrote called "My (horrible) Father", which has become very successful.
8	8	"Rixty Minutes"	Bryan Newton	Tom Kauffman & Justin Roiland	March 17, 2014	1.48
As the family watches The Bachelor, Rick is dissatisfied with the quality of Earth TV so he upgrades the cable to show programming from every conceivable dimension. Eventually, they see Jerry on TV as a successful actor in an alternate reality. The family, minus Rick and Morty, uses Rick's goggles to see through the eyes of their duplicates in that alternative reality, where Jerry and Beth have successful lives, they never married, and Summer was never born because Beth had an abortion. Jerry, Beth and Summer have a heated discussion in which they conclude that family life is holding them back and Beth admits that Summer was an unwanted pregnancy. Summer feels unloved and plans to run away, but Morty tells her that he and Rick themselves came from an alternate dimension (as depicted in "Rick Potion #9") and persuades her to stay. Ultimately, Beth and Jerry discover that their alternate selves are miserable in their own ways and witness them getting back together, which convinces them that they also belong together. Post-credits scene: The family goes on vacation into an alternate reality where hamsters live in human rectums that they saw on the interdimensional TV.
9	9	"Something Ricked This Way Comes"	John Rice	Mike McMahan	March 24, 2014	1.54
Summer works in an antique shop which is run by the Devil, which gives away items that come with harmful curses. Rick sets up a competitor shop where he uses science to remove the curses, and the Devil is put out of business. Summer helps him to relaunch a successful dot-com company, but he betrays her and keeps the company for himself. Summer and Rick build muscle mass and publicly beat up the Devil to get revenge. Meanwhile, Jerry, helping Morty with his homework, insists that Pluto is a planet. They are abducted by Plutonians to their world, where Jerry is mistaken for a scientist. His statements about Pluto being a planet make him instantly popular, but it is later revealed to him that Pluto is shrinking due to corporate plutonium mining, and the Plutonian leadership keeps the population distracted by assuring them Pluto is still a planet. Jerry tells the Pluto citizens the truth on a public speech, causing him to be hated and deported back to Earth with Morty. Post-credits scene: Rick and Summer merrily beat a Neo-Nazi, a bully, a member of the Westboro Baptist Church who has been holding an anti-gay sign, and an abusive dog owner.
10	10	"Close Rick-counters of the Rick Kind"	Stephen Sandoval	Ryan Ridley	April 7, 2014	1.75
The show's original Rick is wrongfully accused of murdering twenty-seven Ricks from alternate dimensions and kidnapping their respective Mortys. The Trans-Dimensional Council of Ricks arrests him and finds him guilty, upon discovering incriminating evidence which was actually fabricated to frame him. Rick and Morty escape and are chased by a few duplicates of themselves. The Smith household is flooded with other Ricks and Jerry develops a friendship with the good-natured "Doofus Rick". The real culprits seem to be an "Evil" Rick and his Evil Morty, who have been using Mortys' low intelligence brainwaves as a way to conceal themselves. They capture the original Rick and Morty, but the original Morty leads a rebellion of alternate Mortys and releases the original Rick. Rick informs the Council about the real killer, thus clearing his own name. After Rick and Morty depart, the Council discovers that Evil Rick was actually under control by an unknown puppet-master, which was Evil Morty all along. Evil Morty escapes by blending into the crowd of Mortys without a Rick. Post-credits scene: Jerry waves at Doofus Rick from the window, prompting Rick to make fun of him.
11	11	"Ricksy Business"	Stephen Sandoval	Ryan Ridley & Tom Kauffman	April 14, 2014	2.13
Jerry and Beth participate in a reenactment of Titanic, but the ship unexpectedly fails to sink. Jerry spends some time alone with Lucy, a female janitor who eventually proves to be a deranged fan of the movie, forcing him to imitate scenes with her at gunpoint. She almost rapes Jerry, but Beth saves him. Meanwhile, Rick is left in charge of Morty and Summer, but they have a large party. Among the guests are teenagers, aliens, Gearhead, Squanchy, alternate Ricks and Abradolf Lincler (a DNA combination of Adolf Hitler and Abraham Lincoln). Not only do they make a mess, but the whole house is accidentally sent into another dimension, where Lincler seemingly dies (he actually survives). Ultimately, the guests are sent away and the house is returned to its place. Rick, Morty and Summer only have minutes to spare before Beth and Jerry arrive, so they use a contraption to freeze time, allowing them to repair the house. They watch Titanic and unanimously agree on how terrible it is. Post-credits scene: Giant alien beasts repeatedly insert and remove Lincler and a teenager from the party in their bodies.

== Production ==
Series co-creator Justin Roiland, John Rice, Jeff Myers, Bryan Newton and Stephen Sandoval served as directors, while Roiland, series co-creator Dan Harmon, Tom Kauffman, Ryan Ridley, Wade Randolph and Eric Acosta served as writers; writer's assistant Mike McMahan was also given writing credit. All episodes in the first season originally aired in the United States on Adult Swim, and are rated TV-14. However, the uncensored version of the episodes released on DVD and Blu-ray are rated TV-MA.

All episodes from this season were originally produced and broadcast in 16:9 high-definition on both Adult Swim's HD feeds. This season began production in January 2013.

== Reception ==
The first season has an approval rating of 97% on Rotten Tomatoes based on 29 reviews, with an average rating of 8.30 out of 10. The site's critics consensus reads, "Rick and Morty zaps onto screens and makes an instant impression with its vivid splashes of color, improvisational voice acting, and densely-plotted science fiction escapades -- bringing a surprising amount of heart to a cosmically heartless premise." On Metacritic, the season has a score of 85 out of 100, based on reviews from 8 critics, indicating "universal acclaim".

== Home media ==
The first season was released on DVD (Region 1) and Blu-ray on October 7, 2014. Before its release, Roiland had confirmed that it would contain uncensored audio tracks.
