= Raising Gazorpazorp =

- Rick and Morty episode
- Episode no.: Season 1 Episode 7
- Directed by: Jeff Myers
- Written by: Eric Acosa; Wade Randolph
- Original air date: March 10, 2014
- Running time: 22 minutes

Guest appearances
- Finnegan Perry infant Morty Jr.; Will Jennings child Morty Jr.; Justin Roiland teen Morty Jr.; Richard Christy young adult Morty Jr.; Maurice LaMarche adult Morty Jr.; as Brad Anderson; Claudia Black as Mar-Sha; Tom Kenny as Pawnshop Clerk

Episode chronology
← Previous "Rick Potion No. 9"	Next → "Rixty Minutes"
- Rick and Morty season 1

"Raising Gazorpazorp" is the seventh episode of the first season of the American television series Rick and Morty. It was directed by Jeff Myers and written by Eric Acosta and Wade Randolph, and aired on March 10, 2014. The episode has received mixed reviews from critics. The title of the episode is a play on words to the film Raising Arizona and the television series Raising Hope.

== Plot ==
In a pawn shop in space, Rick buys Morty a sex robot, much to his family's chagrin. Soon after, the robot births Morty's alien hybrid child whom he names Morty Jr. Rick and Summer go to the sex robot's planet of origin, Gazorpazorp, to find better suited parents for Morty Jr. After discovering that the Gazorpazorpian females are the dominant gender on the planet, Rick and Summer learn that the males of this species mature in only days and are, by nature, extremely violent. The Gazorpazorpian females arrest Rick due to his open misogyny and threaten to execute both him and Summer until Summer reveals her fashionable top was made by a man, convincing them to let them go free.

Meanwhile, Morty Jr.'s quick aging puts pressure on Morty to try and raise him. Fearing his aggressive instincts, Morty keeps Morty Jr. inside by telling him Earth's atmosphere is poisonous to him. However, the isolation causes Morty Jr. to become rebellious by his teen years. In a suicide attempt, Morty Jr. realizes Morty lied to him about the air, and he goes on a rampage through the town until Rick arrives and prepares to kill Morty Jr. Morty steps in the way of Rick's weapon, telling him he still loves Morty Jr. After hearing Brad Anderson admit that he writes the Marmaduke comics to channel his homicidal urges, Morty Jr. decides to move out and live on his own while channeling his aggression into a creative art. In the post-credits scene, Morty Jr. goes to a talk show to talk about a book he wrote called My (Horrible) Father, which has become very successful and portrays Morty as an abusive parent.

== Reception ==
=== Viewing figures ===
Upon its airdate, "Raising Gazorpazorp" was watched by 1.76 million American viewers.

=== Critical response ===
The first season has an approval rating of 96% on Rotten Tomatoes based on 28 reviews, with an average rating of 8.19 out of 10. The site's critics consensus reads, "Rick and Morty zaps onto screens and makes an instant impression with its vivid splashes of color, improvisational voice acting, and densely-plotted science fiction escapades—bringing a surprising amount of heart to a cosmically heartless premise." The episode was greatly criticized by Corey Plante of Inverse, who said "It's hard to digest or interpret in 'Raising Gazorpazorp' because like it often does, Rick and Morty quickly brushes aside an otherwise compelling entry point for poignant social commentary to move on to the next joke" and "This could've been a really cool turning point where the show demonstrates how Rick's dumb, chauvinistic expectations get undermined by a mature, sophisticated society. Instead, they're all dim-witted and basic."

Positive reviews include Zack Handlen's The A.V. Club review, which claimed "As entertainingly over-the-top as the storyline is, it's a surprisingly level-headed look at the challenges that face anyone trying to raise a child. Beth and Jerry offer Morty advice on what he should do, but it's contradictory, and the minute anything goes wrong, the blame falls on Morty's shoulders. Regardless of how good his intentions are, the poor kid ends up lying to Morty Jr." Joe Matar of Den of Geek praised the episode's uniqueness, saying "One fun thing 'Raising Gazorpazorp' does is swap Morty and his sister Summer's roles. Changing up the usual formula, Morty's the one who has to stay home and do the, uh, 'normal' sitcom story, while Summer goes planet-hopping with Rick."
