= Pilot (Rick and Morty) =

Pilot episode of Rick and Morty

- Rick and Morty episode
- Episode no.: Season 1 Episode 1
- Directed by: Justin Roiland
- Written by: Dan Harmon; Justin Roiland
- Original air date: December 2, 2013

Episode chronology
← Previous —	Next → "Lawnmower Dog"
- Rick and Morty (season 1)

The pilot episode of the American animated television sitcom Rick and Morty was written by series creators Dan Harmon and Justin Roiland, and directed by Justin Roiland. The episode premiered on Adult Swim on December 2, 2013. The series introduces the series' protagonist protagonists—alcoholic scientist Rick Sanchez and his innocent teenage grandson Morty Smith—as they embark on a dangerous interdimensional adventure to fetch Mega Tree seeds. The pilot had a positive reception and was seen by about 1.1 million viewers when it premiered.

== Plot ==
In the opening scene, a blackout-drunk Rick wakes up Morty and brings him on a journey in his newly built flying vehicle; having made a neutrino bomb, Rick offers to destroy humanity and allow Morty and his crush Jessica to serve as the new "Adam and Eve"; after Morty forces Rick to land the vehicle, Rick says it was all a test to get Morty to act more assertive, before passing out, leaving Morty to defuse the bomb.

The following day, Morty's parents Jerry and Beth Smith, believing Rick (who has been living with the Smith family for the past year after having abandoned his adult daughter Beth for the last twenty years) to be a bad influence on Morty, contemplate having Rick put in a nursing home, while Rick takes Morty out of school on an adventure to another dimension ("Dimension 35-C"), which has the perfect conditions for growing "Mega Trees", which bear "Mega Fruit" holding "Mega Seeds", which Rick requires for his research. To get past intergalactic customs, Morty hides the Mega Tree seeds in his rectum, but when their cover is blown, Rick and Morty escape while engaging in a shootout with bureaucratic alien insects.

Meanwhile, after being called into school in response to Morty's absences, Jerry and Beth discover that Morty has missed a semester of school in the time that he has spent on adventures with Rick, for a total of seven hours attended over a two-month period, and decide to begin moving Rick's possessions from their garage into a moving van to go to a nursing home. As Rick and Morty return, Rick begins to argue with Jerry and Beth about the merits of taking Morty on adventures with him, before having him state the square root of pi and the first law of thermodynamics, both of which he immediately and correctly recites, both to his own and his parents' shock. Rick tells Jerry and Beth that later in his own life, Morty will be doing amazing things as a result of their adventures, satisfying them both as they leave to reconnect. After Morty comments on his surprise intelligence, Rick reveals that his knowledge was as a result of the Mega Seeds he had in his rectum, having planned the adventure to convince Jerry and Beth to allow them to go on further adventures, and that the seeds' after-effects will leaving him writhing on the floor for the next few hours. As Morty begins writhing, Rick informs his grandson that they will need to go back and get more, before going into a nonsensical rant that they will be going on lots of more crazy adventures, promising "Rick and Morty, forever and ever, a hundred years, Rick and Morty..."

== Reception ==
Zach Handlen of The A.V. Club gave the shows episode a B+ rating, stating that "[the viewer is] never allowed to forget the dark implications of Rick’s ambitions. Which means there are still stakes, which makes the jokes funnier and keeps the stories interesting." Jason Tabrys of Screen Rant was overall positive in his review of the episode, drawing comparisons to Doctor Who and The Hitchhiker's Guide to the Galaxy, some of Harmon's inspirations.
