= Twelve Days of Christmas Eve =

Twelve Days of Christmas Eve may refer to:

- 12 Days of Christmas Eve, a 2004 television film starring Steven Weber and Molly Shannon
- The 12 Days of Christmas Eve, a 2022 television film starring Kelsey Grammer and Spencer Grammer
