= Something Ricked This Way Comes =

- Rick and Morty episode
- Episode no.: Season 1 Episode 9
- Directed by: John Rice
- Written by: Mike McMahan
- Production code: 109
- Original air date: March 24, 2014
- Running time: 22 minutes

Guest appearances
- Alfred Molina as Lucius Needful; Brandon Johnson as Mr. Goldenfold; Richard Fulcher as King Flippy Nips; Nolan North as Scroopy Noopers

Episode chronology
← Previous "Rixty Minutes"	Next → "Close Rick-counters of the Rick Kind"
- Rick and Morty season 1

"Something Ricked This Way Comes" is the ninth episode of the first season of the American science fiction comedy television series Rick and Morty. Aired on March 24, 2014, the episode was directed by John Rice and written by Mike McMahan. The episode aired on March 6, 2016, in Canada. It stars Justin Roiland as Rick Sanchez and Morty Smith.

The title is a reference to the dark fantasy novel Something Wicked This Way Comes by Ray Bradbury, in which "Mr. Dark", the sinister leader of a traveling carnival comes to town, granting the townsfolk's secret desires but always paired with an ironic twist. For example, a 50-year-old schoolteacher wishes to be young again and is transformed into a little girl but is now blind. A stand-alone sequel miniseries, Rick and Morty Go to Hell, was published by Oni Press from April 29 to October 21, 2020.

== Plot ==
In a take on Needful Things, Summer works in an antique shop run by the Devil (under the alias of Lucius Needful), which gives away items that come with harmful curses. After Rick is given a microscope that would have greatly diminished his intelligence, he develops technology that can quantify evil and detect curses. Rick then sets up a competing shop where he uses science to remove the curses, and the Devil is put out of business. Summer helps him to successfully re-launch the shop online as N33dful, but he betrays her and keeps the company for himself. Rick has become bored with running a business and burns the shop down, then he and Summer build muscle and publicly beat up the Devil to get revenge.

Meanwhile, Jerry, helping Morty with a model Solar System as a science fair project, insists that Pluto is a planet, going so far as to lobby NASA to re-instate its planetary status. They are abducted by Plutonians to their planet, where Jerry is mistaken for a scientist. His statements about Pluto being a planet make him instantly popular. Morty is told by Scroopy Noopers, a leading Plutonian scientist, that Pluto is shrinking due to corporate plutonium mining which will ultimately lead to its destruction, and that the Plutonian leadership is keeping the population distracted by assuring them Pluto is still a planet. Morty fails to convince Jerry of Pluto's diminishing size and the resultant cover-up, returning to Earth in frustration. However, after witnessing the arrest of Scroopy Noopers and hearing Flippy Nips, the King of Pluto and Scroopy Noopers's father, lets slip that Pluto is in fact a celestial dwarf, Jerry tells the Plutonian citizens the truth and denounces himself in a public speech, causing him to be hated and deported back to Earth. Jerry apologises to Morty and asks if they could finish his science fair project, but Morty tells him that he instead plans to hand in a robot built by Rick to pass butter.

In a post-credits scene, Summer and Rick use their new muscle mass to beat up a neo-Nazi, a bully, a member of the Westboro Baptist Church and an abusive dog owner.

== Reception ==
Corey Plante of Inverse praised the unusual Morty-Jerry storyline in the episode, but criticized other parts of it, saying "So the surface level plots of "Something Ricked This Way Comes" feel pretty boring, with one being more derivative than it is subversive and the other being a long-winded joke." Zack Handlen of The A.V. Club said: "It's a riff on climate change deniers: when the truth is that unsettling, people would much rather pretend they can make it go away by listening to an idiot."
