= Rick Potion No. 9 =

"Rick Potion #9"
- Rick and Morty episode
- Episode no.: Season 1 Episode 6
- Directed by: Stephen Sandoval
- Written by: Justin Roiland
- Original air date: January 27, 2014
- Running time: 21 minutes

Guest appearances
- Kari Wahlgren as Jessica; Brandon Johnson as Mr. Goldenfold

Episode chronology
← Previous "Meeseeks and Destroy"	Next → "Raising Gazorpazorp"
- Rick and Morty season 1

"Rick Potion #9" is the sixth episode of Rick and Morty. It premiered on Adult Swim on January 27, 2014, was written by Justin Roiland, and directed by Stephen Sandoval. In the episode, a love potion goes wrong, creating a virus that begins to infect the entire world population, making everyone fall in love with Morty. The episode received critical acclaim, receiving praise for its story, subplot, and ending. It was seen by 1.7 million viewers at first airing. The title of the episode is in reference to the 1959 song "Love Potion No. 9" by the Clovers.

== Plot ==
Morty has a long-term crush on Jessica, a teenage girl at his school. On the night of the Flu Season Dance at his school, his desire leads him to ask Rick for a love serum, and Rick acquiesces, giving him a serum derived from vole hormones. Upon Morty giving Jessica (who, unbeknownst to Morty, has the flu) the serum, it latches onto the flu virus and goes airborne, spreading through the entire planet in a matter of minutes and causing every person not directly related to Morty to fall in love with him. Only Morty's relatives, including Rick, are unaffected. In an attempt to counteract the DNA used in the original serum, Rick makes an antidote from mantis DNA, but the serum fails, instead causing the world's population to mutate into monstrous mantis-people, all of whom want to eat Morty after mating with him.

As these events transpire, Jerry, feeling insecure about his relationship with Beth, follows her to work after she is called in for a late shift. En route, Jerry finds the road blocked by the chaos created by the mantis-people; when they attempt to force Morty's whereabouts out of him, he escapes and kills them with a shotgun. Arriving at the equine hospital at which Beth works, he finds Beth cornered by her raving, infected co-worker; after Jerry kills him with a crowbar, the two reconcile their marriage.

Hiding from the infected population in the desert, Rick makes a third serum to undo all the previous ones. This serum, amalgamated from various DNA sources, does end the world population's desire for Morty but also mutates them into barely humanoid blobs. Morty angrily blames Rick for causing the disaster, although Rick points out that the situation occurred because Morty wanted to essentially "roofie" Jessica. Dubbing the monstrosities "Cronenbergs" (a reference to famous director of body horror films David Cronenberg), Rick decides the situation is beyond repair. Rather than attempt to fix the world, he scans the multiverse to find another universe nearly identical to their own in which alternate versions of himself and Morty managed to find a solution and avert the mutation pandemic, but perished soon after. Rick and Morty enter the new reality (Dimension C-131), bury their alternate selves in the backyard and quietly assume their place. The episode ends with Morty visibly traumatized by the transpired events and his counterpart's gruesome death, set to the song "Look on Down from the Bridge" by Mazzy Star.

In a post-credits scene, Jerry, Beth, and Summer are the sole unmutated humans left in the ruined Cronenberg-infested world. As Summer reenacts scenes from Jaws, Jerry and Beth admit they are happier with both Rick and Morty gone. Meanwhile, Cronenberg versions of Rick and Morty appear from a dimension where Cronenberg Rick accidentally turned the whole world into normal people.

== Reception ==
Zack Handlen of The A.V. Club gave the episode of B+, reserving particularly strong praise for what they saw as a "deconstruction of the creepiness of the love potion trope". Joe Matar of the website Den of Geek liked the episode, saying that while it was not as funny as the previous episode, it had a wonderfully dark ending, and that he enjoyed Jerry's action hero subplot. David Roa of Dead Screen loved the ending, saying that "while it was very deus ex machina, it was still satisfying." He compared it to how people treat the planet, and just move to a new location after destroying where they live. An author for the website Junkie Monkeys said that the episode was his second favorite up until that point, behind only "Anatomy Park". Noel Davila from the website Geeks Under Grace rated the episode 8.6 out of 9.0, saying the episode is "one of the greatest and arguably most impactful episodes to the entire series mythology". He appreciated the relationship dynamics in this episode and said that it did a great job in combining high-concept scientific theory with their extremely dark humour.

After the airing of the first half of the first season, Justin Roiland considered the episode his favorite for its pacing and ending, which he felt was "insane".
