= The 12 Days of Christmas Eve =

2022 American Christmas film

- Directed by: Dustin Rikert
- Written by: Eirene Tran Donohue
- Produced by: Molly M. Mayeux; Colin Theys; Andrew Gernhard
- Starring: Kelsey Grammer; Spencer Grammer
- Cinematography: Branden James Maxham
- Edited by: Bryan Capri
- Music by: Kara Talve
- Production company: Synthetic Cinema International
- Release date: November 26, 2022 (US)

The 12 Days of Christmas Eve is a 2022 American television film starring Kelsey Grammer and his daughter Spencer Grammer.

== Cast ==
- Kelsey Grammer as Brian Conway, President/CEO of PC Electric & Appliances
- Spencer Grammer as Michelle Conway, Brian's daughter
- Uschi Umscheid as Harkin, Michelle's daughter and Brian's granddaughter
- Mark Jacobson as Jet, Brian's assistant
- Mitch Poulos as Santa Claus
- Diana Toshiko as Nina Nishii, an investor
- Lisa Gorlitsky as Dale, executive of PC Electric & Appliances
- Alvin Keith as Sean, executive of PC Electric & Appliances
- Daymon Patterson as Cheery Caroler

== Production ==
Kelsey Grammer's company, Grammnet NH Productions, conceptualized the story of the film and wanted to include his family in the film, like his daughter Spencer. With assistance from Johnson Production Group, the Synthetic Cinema International (Rocky Hill, Connecticut) produced the film. The father-daughter story derived from Kelsey and Spencer's own real-life relationship.

Some scenes were filmed at a Keith's Appliances store in Norwich, Connecticut. The main character's fictional company originally specialized on electronics retail, but the number of small independent electronics stores had declined at the time. Thus, the company's specialty extended to appliances and electronics retail. A Mohegan Sun penthouse also served as the character's house in New York. Some other scenes were filmed at Norm's Diner in Groton. The diner's one of co-owners and one of servers were extras.

The filming also occurred at the Charter Oak Federal Credit Union headquarters in Waterford on September 20–24, 2022. The HQ's conference room became the character's exclusive office; its board room, the fictional company's conference room; its lobby, the hospital's waiting room; its door to lending department, a door to a surgery room. Fake snow and ice were placed at the HQ's main entrance.

The filming lasted at least two weeks from September 2022 to October 6, 2022, in Mystic, Connecticut. The rain occurred outdoors amid filming. Green screens were utilized.

Executive producers of the film were Grammer, Tom Russo, and Jordan McMahon. Eirene Tran Donohue wrote the script, and Dustin Rikert directed the film.

== Release ==
The film originally aired on Lifetime in the United States at 8 p.m. Eastern / 7 p.m. Central on November 26, 2022, as part of the network's It's a Wonderful Lifetime 2022 schedule.

== See also ==
- Groundhog Day (film)
- List of films featuring time loops
