= Spencer Grammer =

American actress (born 1983)

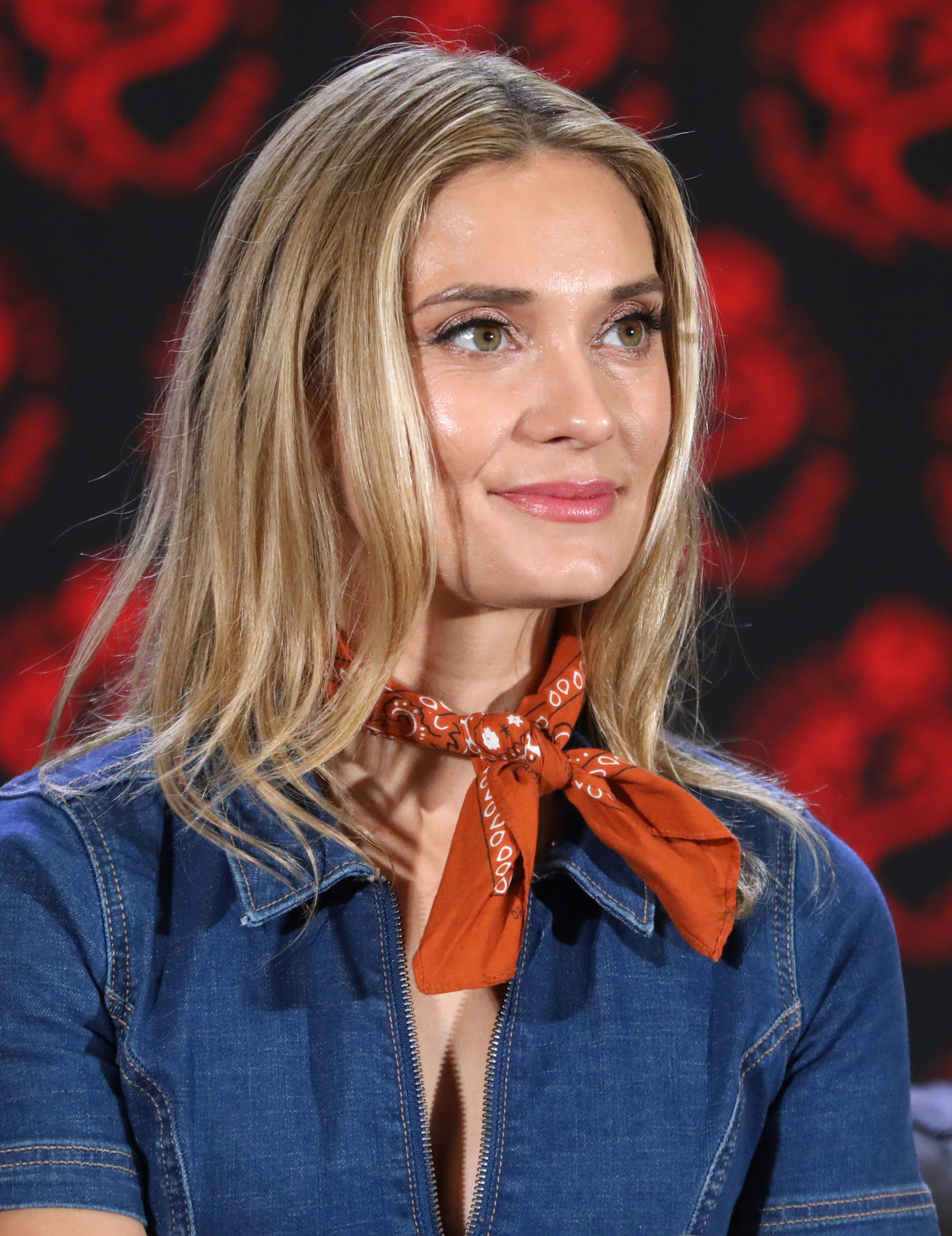
- Grammer in 2024
- Born: Spencer Karen Grammer; October 9, 1983 (age 43); Los Angeles, California, U.S.
- Education: Marymount Manhattan College (BFA); Columbia University (MFA)
- Occupation: Actress
- Years active: 1992–present
- Known for: Summer Smith in Rick and Morty
- Spouse: James Hesketh (m. 2011; div. 2017)
- Children: 1
- Parents: Kelsey Grammer (father); Doreen Alderman (mother)
- Relatives: Greer Grammer (half-sister)

Spencer Karen Grammer (born October 9, 1983) is an American actress best known for her roles as the voice of Summer Smith in the Adult Swim animated science-fiction series Rick and Morty and as Casey Cartwright in the ABC Family college comedy-drama series Greek.

== Early life ==
Spencer Grammer was born in Los Angeles, California. She is the daughter of actor Kelsey Grammer and Doreen Alderman, and was named after her paternal aunt, Karen, who was murdered in 1975. She has six paternal half-siblings: three half-sisters (the actress Greer Grammer, Mason, and Faith) and three half-brothers (Jude, Gabriel, and James). She also has a maternal half-sister named Madison. She attended Marymount Manhattan College in New York City.

== Career ==
Grammer's first role was as a child, appearing uncredited on the show Cheers, in which her father Kelsey Grammer starred. At 19 years old, she starred in the play Birdy's Bachelorette Party in the role of Birdy for five weeks at The Culture Club in New York City.

Grammer played the female lead, Casey Cartwright, in the ABC Family series Greek. The show followed the life of a sister (Grammer) and her brother, Rusty Cartwright, played by Jacob Zachar, as they navigate college and life within the world of the Greek system fraternities and sororities in a midwestern Ohio college town.

In 2013, Grammer starred opposite Blair Underwood in Ironside, the remake of the popular 1960s television series of the same name. The show was canceled after three episodes aired. Since 2013, she has also voiced the character of Summer Smith on the Adult Swim animated science fiction series Rick and Morty.

Grammer is the lead vocalist for the band Belle and Chain.

== Personal life ==
Grammer married James Hesketh, a firefighter, on February 11, 2011. In October 2011, she gave birth to their son, Emmett. In November 2017, James Hesketh filed for divorce from Grammer.

Grammer survived being stabbed in July 2020, while trying to break up a fight.

== Filmography ==
Film
Year	Title	Role	Notes
2006	The Path of Most Resistance	Prudence	Short film
2006	Beautiful Ohio	Carlene	
2007	Descent	Stephanie (uncredited)	
2011	Missing William	Jill	
2013	In Lieu of Flowers	Rachel	
2015	Roommate Wanted	Dee	
2016	Beyond Paradise	Rachel	
2017	Boone: The Bounty Hunter	Kat	
2017	Random Tropical Paradise	Colette Weller	
2024	Isla Monstro	Moon	

Television
Year	Title	Role	Notes
1992	Cheers	Little Girl	Episode: "One Hugs, the Other Doesn't"
2004	Clubhouse	Sheila	Episode: "Pilot" and "Chin Music"
2005	Clubhouse	Sheila	Episode: "Road Trip"
2005	Jonny Zero	Dora	Episode: "Pilot"
2005	Third Watch	Kimmie Haynes	Episode: "Kingpin Rising"
2006	Law & Order: Special Victims Unit	Katie	Episode: "Infected"
2006	The Bedford Diaries	Lee's Classmate	Episode: "Love and the Tenth Planet"
2006	Six Degrees	Nanny	Episode: "Pilot"
2006	As the World Turns	Dr. Lucy Montgomery	Main cast
2007–2011	Greek	Casey Cartwright	Main role
2009	Robot Chicken	Atlantis / Mother (voice)	Episode: "Please Do Not Notify Our Contractors"
2012	CSI: NY	Kim Barnett	Episode: "Flash Pop"
2013	CSI: Crime Scene Investigation	Ella St James	Episode: "Dead Air"
2013	Ironside	Holly	Main cast
2013–present	Rick and Morty	Summer Smith (voice)	Main cast
2014	Royal Pains	Ashley	Episode: "Everybody Loves Ray, Man"
2014	Chicago PD	Jenn Cassidy	2 episodes
2015	Mr. Robinson	Ashleigh Willows	Series regular
2016	Scorpion	Airman Woodrow	Episode: "Civil War"
2017	Grey's Anatomy	Candace	Episode: "In the Air Tonight"
2017	Graves	Katie Farrell	9 episodes
2018	Tell Me a Story	Beth Miller	6 episodes
2021	The Barbarian and the Troll	Brendar (voice)	Main cast
2022	Hacking Google	Narrator (voice)	6 episodes
2022	The 12 Days of Christmas Eve	Michelle Conway	Kelsey Grammer played her father in the movie
2022–2023	Solar Opposites	Lynette (voice)	3 episodes
