= IKEA Heights =

Comedy web series

- Genre: Comedy; Melodrama; Parody
- Created by: Dave Seger; Paul Bartunek
- Written by: Dave Seger; Spencer Strauss; Paul Bartunek; Tom Kauffman
- Directed by: Dave Seger
- Starring: Randall Park; Whitney Avalon; Matt Braunger; Tom Kauffman; Jess Lane; Wade Randolph; Abed Gheith; Delbert Dean Shoopman; Dean Pelton; Matt Peters
- Country of origin: United States
- Original language: English
- No. of seasons: 1
- No. of episodes: 7

Production
- Producers: Dave Seger; Paul Bartunek
- Production location: Burbank, California
- Camera setup: Paul Bartunek
- Running time: ~30 minutes
- Production company: Channel 101

Original release
- Release: May 31, 2009 – January 31, 2010

IKEA Heights is a 2009 comedic melodrama web series created by Dave Seger, Paul Bartunek, Delbert Shoopman, Spencer Strauss, and Tom Kauffman for Channel 101. A spoof of soap operas, the series was filmed covertly inside the IKEA store in Burbank, California. IKEA Heights stars Randall Park, Whitney Avalon, and Matt Braunger.

Entertainment Weekly's Whitney Pastorek wrote that the series "is so brilliant and awesome that its glories can really only be diminished by additional words."

Madeleine Löwenborg-Frick, a spokesperson for IKEA's Canadian branch, said of the series, "Absolutely, we think it's funny. We see the humour in it and we approach our own marketing with a similar tongue-in-cheek humour. But unauthorized filming in our stores isn't a good thing. There's proper channels that people who want to film in our stores can go through."

== Premise ==
The series is set in the sketchy town IKEA Heights, and focuses on different mysteries and crimes that impact the residents. These include murders caused by being smothered by pillows, and a zombie invasion.
