= Summer Smith =

Fictional Rick and Morty character

- Rick and Morty character
- Summer Smith, as depicted in Rick and Morty.
- First appearance: Summer C-131: "Rick Potion #9" (2014); Summer Prime: "Pilot" (2013); Summer C-132: "The Wubba Lubba Dub Dub of Wall Street" (2015)
- Last appearance: Summer C-132: "Head-Space" (2016); Summer Prime: "Look Who's Cronenberging Now" (2018)
- Created by: Justin Roiland; Dan Harmon
- Designed by: Justin Roiland
- Voiced by: Spencer Grammer (Rick and Morty); Akiha Matsui (The Anime); Donna Bella Litton (The Anime; English Dub)

In-universe information
- Full name: Summer Smith
- Alias: Ms. Die Hard
- Nickname: Sum-Sum
- Species: Human
- Occupation: Student; Assistant to Lucius Needful; Empress of Glorzo
- Affiliation: Death Stalkers
- Weapon: Wolverine claws
- Family: Rick Sanchez (grandfather); Jerry Smith (father); Beth Smith (mother); Space Beth (mother); Morty Smith (brother); Leonard Smith (grandfather); Joyce Smith (grandmother); Diane Sanchez (grandmother); CHUD Heir (uncle)
- Spouses: Hemorrhage (ex-husband)
- Significant others: Ethan (ex-boyfriend); Christina LaCroix (ex-girlfriend)
- Children: Naruto Smith (son-nephew); Summer Smith Jr. (adoptive stepdaughter)
- Relatives: Mortimer Smith Jr. (nephew); Thoolie Smith (nephew); Maria Smith (niece)
- Nationality: Hispanic-American
- Age: 17

Summer Smith is one of the main characters of the American media franchise Rick and Morty. Created by Justin Roiland and Dan Harmon and voiced by Spencer Grammer in the original animated series and Akiha Matsui in the anime series, Summer is a conventional and often superficial 17-year-old, who is obsessed with improving her social status among her peers. Known for her smart and humorous personality and for her high dexterity, the character has been well-received. She is the well-meaning and intelligent older sister of Morty Smith, the daughter of Jerry and Beth Smith, the granddaughter of Diane and Rick Sanchez, the ex-wife of Hemorrhage, and mother-aunt of Naruto Smith.

Following Rick and Morty abandoning their original reality in the first season episode "Rick Potion #9", a new Summer identical to the original is introduced, Summer C-131; the original Summer Prime is shown in a now post-apocalyptic wasteland with her parents in the third season episode "The Rickshank Rickdemption", before dying in the Rick and Morty comic series (later referenced in the sixth season premiere "Solaricks") a character trait later incorporated into their television series depiction. The character also serves as the protagonist of the 2016 miniseries Lil' Poopy Superstar, exploring her adventures after the events of the second season episode "Total Rickall", as well as the anthology series Rick and Morty Presents.

== Biography ==
Summer is 17 years old and is a student at Harry Herpson High School along with her younger brother Morty. She occasionally expresses jealousy that Morty gets to accompany Rick on his inter-dimensional adventures, whom she sees as a hero, though he is often contemptuous and dismissive of her teenaged life perspective and values. As the series progresses, Summer begins accompanying Rick and Morty on their adventures and is trusted with restoring their memories in the scenario of the pair being rendered amnesiac.

== Development ==
Addressing the character's "gradual" evolution from side character to main character over the course of the series and Dan Harmon's attribution of her vocal performance to the character's increased role in an interview with Looper, Summer Smith voice actress Spencer Grammer stated that:

"I maybe wasn't necessarily aware that I was having that kind of an influence at all [on the character], but I love voicing Summer and I love acting. So it's really lovely when you do something that you love and other people can find inspiration from that too."

== Reception ==
The character has received positive reception. The Mary Sue praised Summer as "the most interesting female character to ever appear on Adult Swim [and] a great example of powerful, funny feminine youth." The A.V. Club praised "[how] Summer develop[s] from the fun, quippy side character to a notably more active participant in the intergalactic shenanigans and a strong thinker" over the course of the series, stating that "what makes her so fascinating is that some of the things that would be vilified in other young female characters often make her the smartest person in the room. The fact that she’s concerned about being social and popularity makes her the most personable. She tends to have a better understanding of how people work than anybody else." Inverse declared that "Without a doubt, Summer is the most relatable character on Rick and Morty", while SyFy described her as a better main character than their brother Morty, praising her increased role in the series as it goes on.

VerbStomp described Summer as "[one] of those girls in high school everyone hated, but simultaneously tried to be [and] primarily concerned with increasing her status amongst her peers, and [classmates] — she’s a necessary trope that adds to the dynamic of the Smith family."
