= Jerry Smith (Rick and Morty) =

Fictional Rick and Morty character

- Rick and Morty character
- First appearance: Jerry Prime: "Promo Commercial #1" (2013); Jerry C-131: "Rick Potion #9" (2014); Jerry 5126: "Mortynight Run" (2015); Doofus/Evil Jerry (J19ζ7/Mack): "A Tale of Two Jerries, Part One: Jerry-Go-Round" (2016)
- Last appearance: Jerry Prime: Rick and Morty: The Anime (2024); Season Two Jerry: "Solaricks" (2022); Doofus/Evil Jerry (J19ζ7/Mack): Rick and Morty: 10th Anniversary Special (2024)
- Created by: Justin Roiland; Dan Harmon
- Designed by: Justin Roiland
- Voiced by: Chris Parnell; Manabu Muraji (Japanese); Joe Daniels (English Dub; The Anime)

In-universe information
- Full name: Gerald Smith
- Nicknames: Jerry

1st Miggity Miggity Miggity Mack, Master of the Multiverse, and Ruler of The Citadel
- In office "A Tale of Two Jerries, Part Two" – "Three" (Doofus/Evil Jerry Smith J19ζ7)
- Gender: Male
- Occupation: Senior copywriter Stay-at-home Dad; Amateur beekeeper Galactic Orbship superhero (Flamingo Dad); Published author (Never Trying Never Fails); Advertising agent (fired)
- Family: Leonard Smith (father); Joyce Smith (mother)
- Spouses: Beth Smith (wife, briefly separated); Space Beth (wife, throuple)
- Children: Summer Smith (daughter); Morty Smith (son)
- Relatives: Morty Smith, Jr. (grandson); Naruto Smith (grandson); Thoolie Smith (grandson); Rick Sanchez (father-in-law); Diane Sanchez (mother-in-law); Itchy Smith (great-granddaughter)
- Religion: Non-denominational Christian
- Age: 35

Gerald "Jerry" Smith is one of the main characters of the American animated television series Rick and Morty and resulting franchise. Created by Justin Roiland and Dan Harmon, and voiced by Chris Parnell, Jerry is depicted as a stay-at-home dad who finds contentment in his simple life. He unknowingly uses pity as his "signature move", which leads to people hiring him or giving him any sort of consolation. Jerry is infamous for his mutual rivalry with Rick Sanchez, his father-in-law, with the pair ultimately becoming friends in the sixth season. On many occasions in the early seasons, his relationship with his wife, Beth Smith, has been shown to be incredibly unhealthy, co-dependent, and incompatible, before gradually improving over the course of the series. One of Jerry's hobbies is beekeeping, which he picks up sometime during season four. As well as being the son-in-law of mad scientist Rick, Jerry is father of Morty and Summer Smith. Both the original character and their inter-dimensional replacements (introduced in the second season) have received a positive critical reception.

== Biography ==
The series follows multiple "main" Jerrys from different Universes and dimensions. They are:

- Jerry Prime (Promo Commercials, Season 1: Episodes 1–6, Season 3: Episode 1, Comic series: Issue 45, and Season 6: Episode 1), informally known as "Cronenberg Jerry" and "Apocalypse Jerry" in Pocket Mortys
- Jerry C-131 (Season 1, Episode 6–Season 2, Episode 2, Comic series: Issues 21–23, and Season 6: Episode 1), informally known as Season Two Jerry
- Jerry 5126 (Season 2: Episode 2–present and Comic series: Volumes 3–11)
- Jerry C-132 (Comic series: Volumes 1–3)

Jerry was raised by Leonard and Joyce Smith. While in high school, he and Beth Sanchez had unprotected sex on prom night, leading to their first child, Summer Smith. They get married and settle in, and a few years later have Morty Smith. Fourteen years following, Beth's father, Rick Sanchez, who was believed to have abandoned Beth when she was 14-years-old, moves into their house. Rick and Jerry have a distaste for each other, as Rick is driving the family apart, and Rick believes Beth gave up on her dreams by staying with Jerry.

=== Seasons 3–present ===
After being frustrated with Rick's disturbance in the household, Jerry gives Beth (his wife) the decision between Rick or him. Beth picks Rick, and subsequently divorces Jerry. He now lives alone and depressed in a motel room, and out of Morty's request, Rick takes him on a vacation of sorts. During the trip, Jerry is convinced into attempting to murder Rick, which backfires, but makes them both more open about their issues with each other.

Jerry eventually briefly rebounds onto a relationship with an alien named Kiara. After being divorced for a few months, Beth reconciles with Jerry and they get back together. By the end of the season, Jerry and Beth get back together, and by the sixth season, form a throuple with Beth's clone.

=== "A Tale of Two Jerries" ===
An evil version of Jerry from an alternate reality, derisively referred to as "Doofus Jerry", serves as the main antagonist of the comic series arc "A Tale of Two Jerries" — a billionaire and the literal "definition of success" in his home dimension of J19ζ7, this Jerry becomes intrigued with the concept of alternate realities after discovering Season Two Jerry in his dimension visiting his friend Doofus Rick. Electing to take his place, this Jerry takes the pair's portal gun and seeks to seduce Beth, repeatedly beating up Rick to show dominance over him, embarrassing him to the point he elects to call in the Citadel to deal with the invading Jerry. However, on realising this Jerry is from the same reality as Doofus Rick, Rick realises that Doofus Rick's dimension is not a "Doofus" dimension but an "Opposite" one, and bringing this Jerry to the Citadel to have been the equivalent of bringing "a cat into the mousehole". Overtaking the Citadel by genetically modifying himself to produce a gas to make all Ricks subservient to him, and him "walking death" to them, Jerry seeks to subjugate the multiverse, taking a harem of Beths and instructing that he be referred to as "Miggity Miggity Miggity Mack, Master of the Multiverse". After soundly defeating the Smith family with a giant robot of himself against one of Rick, Mack is accidentally crushed and apparently killed by Season Two Jerry when he opens a portal to the Worm Dimension above him, causing a large worm to fall on top of him, which Rick beams away. The Shadow Council of Ricks later reference the "Goddamn Jerry"'s previous control of the Citadel in the third-season episode "The Ricklantis Mixup". Doofus Jerry would then return in the finale of The Space Shake Saga, facing off against the Talking Cat from the fourth-season episode "Claw and Hoarder: Special Ricktim's Morty", as well as the Rick and Morty: 10th Anniversary Special.

== Development ==
In 2017, series creator Dan Harmon made a comparison between Jerry and Rick (his father-in-law) about the ending of "Auto Erotic Assimilation". While Rick is intelligent, he is miserable and tries to kill himself at the end of the episode, while Jerry, oblivious and dumb, is simply happy to have found his weed-wacker. Harmon observes "Does he have it better off? I mean, I think so". Recalling the creation of "Doofus Jerry" as one of his most "favorite [and] beautiful moments of creativity and humor [o]n this book", Oni Press Managing Editor Ari Yarwood attributed the "wonderful secret" of the "hyper-competent, super-evil dude"'s creation to being "because Kyle [Starks] was emailing me about a Doofus Rick idea, and accidentally mixed it up and wrote Doofus Jerry instead, [a]nd then those three amazing ["A Tale of Two Jerries"] issues got written."

Upon the release of the sixth season premiere "Solaricks", Harmon noted that when the original Jerry was abandoned and grief-strucken, he became self-actualised. Jerry's voice actor, Chris Parnell, also commented on this episode, "Any time I take Jerry to a different place emotionally, it's exciting. To go to such a dark apocalyptic place for Jerry was very gratifying."

In a look inside the episode "The Whirly Dirly Conspiracy", Dan Harmon explains that if Rick and Jerry met in a vacuum, they would be friends, but "a vacuums not really possible with Jerry. [He'd] fill that vacuum and create twice as much vacuum". Despite this, the characters are depicted as finally becoming friends in the sixth season episode "Final DeSmithation".

== Reception ==
Year	Award	Category	Nominee(s)	Result	Ref.
2014	BTVA Voice Acting Awards	Best Male Vocal Performance in a Television Series in a Supporting Role — Comedy/Musical	Chris Parnell	Nominated	

Jerry is a generally well-received character. In IGN's review of "Solaricks", Samantha Nelson explains that Jerry is one of the most improved characters on the show. while Richard Urquiza of Fansided complimented Jerry's interactions with the Cenobites in his review of "Amortycan Grickfitti". Brent Botsford, in his review of season four, describes that Jerry has some of the best storylines in the season due to his consistency. In Consequence TV's season six review, Al Shipley says that Jerry is hilarious due to his stellar voice work.

Inverse's negative review of "Childrick of Mort" makes the point that the other characters in the series, especially Summer, are too mean-spirited to him. Corey Plante elaborates that Jerry (as well as the rest of the family) are reduced to ridiculous caricatures of themselves.
