= Beth Smith =

Fictional Rick and Morty character

- Rick and Morty character
- First appearance: Beth C-131: "Rick Potion#9" (2014); Beth Prime: "Pilot" (2013); Beth C-137: "The Rickshank Rickdemption" (2017); Space Beth C-131: "Star Mort Rickturn of the Jerri" (2020; first confirmed appearance)
- Last appearance: Beth Prime: "Look Who's Cronenberging Now" (2018) "Rickmurai Jack" (cameo; 2021)
- Created by: Justin Roiland; Dan Harmon
- Designed by: Justin Roiland
- Voiced by: Sarah Chalke; Coraline Butterworth (young); Michael Cusack (2018); Jun Irie (Japanese dub); Takako Fuji (The Anime); Patricia Duran (The Anime; English dub)

In-universe information
- Full name: Bethany Smith (née Sanchez) "Space Beth" Smith (née Sanchez)
- Nickname: Beth
- Species: Human; Clone (Clone Beth)
- Title: The Destroyer
- Occupation: Beth Smith: Horse surgeon and veterinarian of St. Equis Hospital; Space Beth: Leader of "The Defiance" resistance movement
- Affiliation: Space Beth: Galactic Revolution
- Family: Rick Sanchez (father); Diane Sanchez (mother)
- Spouses: Jerry Smith (husband); Space Beth (wife)
- Children: Summer Smith (daughter); Morty Smith (son)
- Relatives: Leonard Smith (father-in-law) Joyce Smith (mother-in-law) Maria, Naruto, Thoolie, and Morty Smith Jr. (grandchildren)
- Nationality: Hispanic-American
- Age: 34; 1 (biological age of Beth clone)

Bethany Smith (née Sanchez) is one of the main characters of the American animated television series Rick and Morty and the resulting franchise. Created by Justin Roiland and Dan Harmon, Beth is a veterinarian who specializes in horse surgery, who in the first three seasons is struck with a deep sense of dissatisfaction with her life, stemming from her belief that she has "settled" in her marriage, family, and job, leading her to accept her father into her household after he abandoned her as a teenager. Known for her selfish and humorous personality, alcoholism, and abrasiveness when criticized, the character has been well received. She is the level-headed and assertive daughter of mad scientist Rick Sanchez, mother of Morty and Summer Smith, wife of Jerry Smith, and grandmother of Maria, Naruto, Thoolie, and Morty Smith Jr.

Following Rick and Morty abandoning the latter's original reality in the first season episode "Rick Potion #9", a new Beth identical to the original is introduced, Beth C-131; the original Beth Prime is subsequently shown to be ruling a post-apocalyptic wasteland with the original Jerry and Summer in the third season episode "The Rickshank Rickdemption" and the Rick and Morty comic series arc "Look Who's Cronenberging Now", before dying of illness before the events of the sixth season premiere "Solaricks". Following the events of "The ABC's of Beth", in which Beth confronts sharing her father's sociopathy, Rick creates a clone of Beth and sends one of the pair to space; it is left ambiguous as to whether the newly dubbed Space Beth is the clone or the original following the official introduction of the character in "Star Mort Rickturn of the Jerri". The character description for Space Beth in the Pocket Mortys update that accompanied the Adult Swim release of the episode initially identifies her as Clone Beth, despite the episode itself not confirming whether or not she or Beth is the clone; both Beths and Jerry later form a throuple in the sixth-season episode "Bethic Twinstinct". In "Rickmurai Jack", Rick's original Beth, Beth C-137, is revealed to have been killed as a child along with her mother Diane, with Rick having spent the following decades scouring the multiverse for their killer, eventually electing to move in with the adult version of Beth and her family from his target's native reality. The character is voiced by Sarah Chalke, and portrayed by Whitney Avalon in a promotional music video for the third season.

== Biography ==
Rick C-137's original daughter Beth died when she was a child. Later, Rick crashes into an alternate Smith household having the show's main Beth. This Beth was abandoned by her Rick about 20 years ago. This Beth is 34 years old and is an equine veterinarian ("horse doctor") at St. Equis Hospital; Rick subsequently abandons this Beth's reality in "Rick Potion #9" for another identical one, bringing Morty with him. Several episodes have dealt with Beth's dissatisfaction with her life, having wanted to become a "real" surgeon before she became pregnant with her daughter Summer at 17. Beth is depicted as being unperturbed by her father Rick's destructive and dangerous tendencies around her son Morty. She, from childhood, views Rick more favorably than her mother due to their parental separation despite Rick having abandoned her when she was 15.

As a child, Beth is depicted as having had sociopathic personality traits; following the character's cloning, her space-faring adventurer "Space Beth" self in the fourth season finale is depicted as having taken up her father's former position as the leader of resistance movement "The Defiance" against the government of the Galactic Federation.

In "Rickternal Friendshine of the Spotless Mort", Birdperson's memory of Rick states that his original Beth is dead. which is confirmed in "Rickmurai Jack", with the portion of Rick's origin story presented in "The Rickshank Rickdemption" (depicting her and Diane's deaths) having been true.

In "Bethic Twinstinct", Beth and Jerry start a polyamorous relationship with "Space Beth", following both Beths having a series of affairs on Thanksgiving due to ingesting Venusian wine (love potion).

== Development ==
Series creator Justin Roiland has observed that Beth was developed as a character whose behavior would realistically enable Rick to be able to take Morty on their adventures despite her own misgivings, describing them as one who "fetishizes exceptionality. She believes that Rick, as crazy as he is, is the better of her two parents even though she was raised by her mother and she blames her mother's unremarkability on her father's departure, and will do anything to keep her father back in her life." Addressing Beth's continuous "unhealthy" search for approval from her father in an interview with HitFix, Dan Harmon stated that:

"Kids can sometimes idolize their worst parent and blame their supportive parent for chasing off the dad with the guts to leave. ...She believes that Rick, as crazy as he is, is the better of her two parents even though she was raised by her mother and she blames her mother's unremarkability on her father's departure and will do anything to keep her father back in her life."

Addressing the introduction of Space Beth in the fourth season compared to the original Beth, Sarah Chalke praised the "really interesting dynamic" between the characters, expressing interest in future seasons of the series depicting "all of the things she used to do [as a child], like force Rick to make her mind control hair clips so people would like her. Just seeing her behave so much like Rick at such a young age would be really fun."

== Reception ==
Year	Award	Category	Nominee(s)	Result	Ref.
2014	BTVA Voice Acting Awards	Best Female Vocal Performance in a Television Series in a Supporting Role — Comedy/Musical	Sarah Chalke	Nominated	

The character has received positive reception. Inverse complimented Beth's characterization in "The ABC's of Beth" compared to "Pickle Rick", and "the obvious realization that Beth finally vocalizes: She spent years worshipping her father while trying to always do the right thing. But she realizes that he’s a terrible person, and she’s exactly like him." Screen Rant similarly described "the father-daughter relationship between Beth Smith and Rick Sanchez [as] genuinely one of the deeper and more complicated relationships explored in the show, with the history between these two family members stretching for quite some time." in addition to praising their relationship with Space Beth in the fourth season, ranking Beth as having the second-best character arc in the series behind Rick.

VerbStomp described Beth as "both insecure and controlling, intelligent and doubtful, family-oriented and cold. She’s somehow the polar opposite of every emotion at the exact same time", before "ping[ing Beth] as the [most] troubled character of the show", while 411mania praised how "Beth [may] seem cliché on the surface but [her] wants and needs are so fleshed out that we quickly learn what makes these three tick and why they’re anything but ordinary."
