= List of Rick and Morty characters =

List of characters in the Rick and Morty franchise

The members of the Smith household – from left to right: Jerry, Beth, Summer, Morty, and Rick.

Rick and Morty is an American adult animated multimedia franchise originating with the Adult Swim television series of the same name created by Justin Roiland and Dan Harmon, which premiered in 2013. The television series revolves around Rick Sanchez, an eccentric, alcoholic scientist who takes his grandson Morty Smith on dangerous, outlandish adventures throughout the cosmos and alternate universe. The franchise also includes the spin-off series Vindicators 2 and President Curtis, the anime series, and several comic book series and manga series published by Oni Press. The following is a list of characters from the Rick and Morty franchise.

== Overview ==
=== Main characters ===
Character	Rick and Morty									Vindicators 2	Rick and Morty: The Anime	President Curtis	
Character	1	2	3	4	5	6	7	8	9	Vindicators 2	Rick and Morty: The Anime	1	2
Rick Sanchez (Note: Along with voicing Rick Sanchez, both actors also provides the voice work for other versions of the character, in particular Rick Prime.)	Justin Roiland	Justin Roiland	Justin Roiland	Justin Roiland	Justin Roiland	Justin Roiland	Ian Cardoni	Ian Cardoni	Ian Cardoni		Yōhei Tadano Joe Daniels	Ian Cardoni	TBA
Morty Smith (Note: Along with voicing Morty Smith, both actors also provides the voice work for other versions of the character, in particular Evil Morty.)	Justin Roiland	Justin Roiland	Justin Roiland	Justin Roiland	Justin Roiland	Justin Roiland	Harry Belden	Harry Belden	Harry Belden		Keisuke Chiba Gabriel Regojo	Harry Belden	TBA
Jerry Smith (Note: Along with voicing Jerry Smith, Parnell also provides the voice work for other versions of the character, in particular Jerry Prime.)	Chris Parnell	Chris Parnell	Chris Parnell	Chris Parnell	Chris Parnell	Chris Parnell	Chris Parnell	Chris Parnell	Chris Parnell		Manabu Muraji Joe Daniels		TBA
Summer Smith (Note: Along with voicing Summer Smith, Grammer also provides the voice work for other versions of the character.)	Spencer Grammer	Spencer Grammer	Spencer Grammer	Spencer Grammer	Spencer Grammer	Spencer Grammer	Spencer Grammer	Spencer Grammer	Spencer Grammer		Akiha Matsui Donna Bella Litton		TBA
Beth Smith (Note: Along with voicing Beth Smith, Chalke also provides the voice work for other versions of the character, in particular Space Beth.)	Sarah Chalke	Sarah Chalke	Sarah Chalke	Sarah Chalke	Sarah Chalke	Sarah Chalke	Sarah Chalke	Sarah Chalke	Sarah Chalke		Jun Irie Patricia Duran		TBA
The Vindicators			Various							Various			
Elle Smith (Note: Along with voicing Elle Smith, Sasaki and Christian also provide the voice work for other versions of the character.)											Hitomi Sasaki Luci Christian		
Frank											Toshinari Fukamachi Ty Mahany		
President Andre Curtis		Keith David	Keith David	Photo	Keith David	Keith David	Keith David				Fuminori Komatsu Shawn Hamilton	Keith David	Keith David
Roe Banks												Stephanie Beatriz	Stephanie Beatriz
Francis O'Doyle												Jim Rash	Jim Rash

=== Recurring characters ===
Character	First appearance	Rick and Morty									Rick and Morty: The Anime
Character	First appearance	1	2	3	4	5	6	7	8	9	Rick and Morty: The Anime
Jessica	"Pilot" (Note: Identical alternate-universe versions of the characters are introduced following "Rick Potion #9", replacing their original counterparts.) (Note: Identical alternate-universe versions of the characters are introduced following "Solaricks", replacing their counterparts in "Rick Potion #9".)	Kari Wahlgren	Kari Wahlgren	Kari Wahlgren	Kari Wahlgren	Kari Wahlgren		Kari Wahlgren		Kari Wahlgren	Misa Ishii
Principal Gene Vagina	"Pilot"	Phil Hendrie	Phil Hendrie	Phil Hendrie	Phil Hendrie			Phil Hendrie	Phil Hendrie	Phil Hendrie	
Mr. Goldenfold	"Pilot"	Brandon Johnson	Brandon Johnson	Brandon Johnson	Brandon Johnson		Brandon Johnson	Brandon Johnson		Brandon Johnson	Takeshi Hayakawa Shawn Hamilton
Tammy Gueterman	"Meeseeks and Destroy"	Cassie Steele	Cassie Steele	Cassie Steele	Cassie Steele	Cassie Steele					Arisa Sakuraba
Birdperson Phoenixperson	"Ricksy Business"	Dan Harmon	Dan Harmon	Dan Harmon	Dan Harmon	Dan Harmon		Dan Harmon	Dan Harmon		Masashi Hashimoto Andrew Love
Squanchy	"Ricksy Business"	Tom Kenny	Tom Kenny			Tom Kenny		Tom Kenny			
Space Cruiser / Car D.I.A.N.E. / Diane Sanchez	"Pilot" "The Ricks Must Be Crazy" (voice)	Silent	Kari Wahlgren	Silent	Silent	Kari Wahlgren	Kari Wahlgren	Kari Wahlgren	Kari Wahlgren		
Wayne "Mr. Poopybutthole"	"Total Rickall"		Justin Roiland	Justin Roiland	Justin Roiland	Justin Roiland	Justin Roiland	Jon Allen	Jon Allen	Jon Allen	
Gene Gilligan	"The Whirly Dirly Conspiracy"			Tom Kenny	Silent	Tom Kenny	Tom Kenny	Tom Kenny	Tom Kenny		

== Main characters in Rick and Morty ==
=== Rick Sanchez ===
Richard D. "Rick" Sanchez (voiced by Justin Roiland in season 1–6, Ian Cardoni in season 7–present), is a sociopathic, nihilistic, grouchy, immature, crude, rude, narcissistic, self-centered, alcoholic mad scientist who is the widowed father of Beth Smith and the maternal grandfather of Morty and Summer. He is 70 years old as of season 3. The main premise of the show revolves around Rick's high-concept science-fiction misadventures with Morty (often against his will). His sociopathic tendencies coupled with immense intelligence lead his daughter's family to worry about the safety of their son. An extremely intellectual character – frequently referred to by himself and others as the Smartest Man in the Universe – that views his time as valuable, he disparages many ordinary human conventions such as school, marriage, and love, though he displays genuine affection towards his grandchildren and daughter throughout the series. His reaction to the mundane requests asked of him by Morty and other family members suggests he considers himself wholly superior to them, though in several instances throughout the series he shows a lonelier side. He frequently 'burp-talks' words in the middle of a sentence while speaking, presumably as a result of his alcoholism. He is identified as Rick Sanchez of Earth Dimension C-137, or Rick C-137. In "The Wedding Squanchers", Rick, alongside Squanchy and Birdperson, were revealed to be freedom fighters against the Galactic Federation who labeled them terrorists with warrants for their arrest. In order to guarantee the safety of his family, Rick leaves a tip on where he can be found as he surrenders to the Galactic Federation and is incarcerated in one of their prisons. In "The Rickshank Rickdemption" it is revealed that Rick actually turned himself in, in a scheme to destroy the Federation's economy; when the Council of Ricks interferes, Rick also takes the opportunity to take down the Council of Ricks. Rick also orchestrated "sending" Jerry away for his earlier attempt to convince the family to turn him into Federation custody and making Rick "the de-facto patriarch of the household". However, Rick's attempt at driving Jerry away was unsuccessful, resulting in a diminished role in the family. The character was inspired by Emmett Brown from Back to the Future and Marvel's Reed Richards.

=== Morty Smith ===
Mortimer Chauncey "Morty" Smith (voiced by Justin Roiland in season 1–6, Harry Belden in season 7–present) is Rick's neurotic 14-year-old grandson who is frequently dragged into Rick's misadventures. Morty is good-natured but he is easily distressed. He is often reluctant to follow Rick's plans, and he often ends up traumatized by the unorthodox and morally questionable methods Rick uses to 'fix' situations. The main Morty the episodes follow is referred to as the "Mortiest Morty" by Rick due to his courage, which nearly every other Morty lacks due to their main use being makeshift cloaking devices, in which "Morty waves" cancel out a Rick's "genius waves" (a concept Morty takes offense to), and is later revealed to be designated "Morty Prime" in the commentary for "Solaricks". In "The Rickshank Rickdemption", Morty is angry at Rick for abandoning them and convinces Summer not to do so and even comes close to killing Rick when it appears that he is threatening Summer's life, though in the end, after Rick returns home, Morty is glad to have his grandfather back. However, in "The Rickchurian Mortydate", Morty refuses to be at Rick's side when he decides to leave and stays with his parents and Summer. In "Raising Gazorpazorp", he accidentally impregnates an alien breeding robot, which gives birth to his half-alien son, Mortimer Smith Jr.; another son of Morty's, Naruto, is later born in "Rickdependence Spray". Throughout the series, several characters mention that Morty has a learning disability, and he often displays low self-esteem. Despite this, he's shown to be intelligent and resourceful at times, and as the series progresses, he learns how to use many of Rick's devices and even manipulates Rick into taking Jerry on an adventure. By the end of season three he displays an uncanny degree of common sense as well as a deep understanding of Rick's twisted mind, as seen in "Vindicators 3: The Return of Worldender". The character was loosely inspired by Marty McFly from Back to the Future.

=== Jerry Smith ===
Gerald "Jerry" Smith (voiced by Chris Parnell) is Summer and Morty's insecure 34-year-old father, Beth's husband, and Rick's son-in-law, who strongly disapproves of Rick's influence over his family. Jerry used to work at a low-level advertising agency until he was fired for incompetence. Generally insecure, he is frequently led into conflicts stemming from opportunistic posturing, while his marriage is sometimes jeopardized by his wife's reactions to his poor relationship with Rick. Beth views Jerry as meek under his boasts, ultimately fearful of confrontation. However, it is strongly suggested that in spite of their problems, they are emotionally codependent. The episode "Mortynight Run" reveals that one of the Ricks, keenly aware that every Jerry is incapable of surviving off of Earth, created a daycare where every Jerry is dropped off by their Rick and Morty during adventures should he attempt to accompany them; in "Solaricks", it is revealed that Jerry was switched in the Jerryboree, with the main character Jerry of the series having been introduced in "Mortynight Run". It is revealed in the same episode that in some dimensions, Beth has left Jerry and remarried. By the end of "The Wedding Squanchers", having attempted to talk his family into selling Rick out, Jerry becomes the only member of the family to benefit from the Earth joining the Galactic Federation. After the federation collapses, Jerry puts his foot down and tells Beth it is him or Rick, but Beth chooses her father and tells Rick that she and Jerry are getting a divorce. Rick later claims to Morty in a rant that he planned this because Jerry had planned to betray him. As Jerry leaves, Summer ignores him and Rick waits for him to leave. Summer comes to terms with the separation and reconciles with him. In "The Rickchurian Mortydate", Jerry and Beth reconnect and she calls off the divorce, and they later establish a throuple with Beth's clone, Space Beth.

=== Beth Smith ===
Beth Smith (née Sanchez) (voiced by Sarah Chalke) is Rick's daughter, Summer and Morty's mother, and Jerry's wife. She is a veterinarian who specializes in horse surgery, a job she internally feels to be beneath her and is often defensive when her career is compared to human medicine. Several episodes have dealt with Beth's deep dissatisfaction with her life, stemming from her belief that she has "settled" in her marriage, family, and job. She wanted to become a "real" surgeon but became pregnant with Summer at 17. She is an assertive force in her household, while also displaying traits of selfishness, humor, and intelligence. She, from childhood, views Rick more favorably than her mother due to the parental separation. Harmon expanded upon this origin in an interview: "Kids can sometimes idolize their worst parent and blame their supportive parent for chasing off the dad with the guts to leave. ... She believes that Rick, as crazy as he is, is the better of her two parents even though she was raised by her mother and she blames her mother's unremarkability on her father's departure and will do anything to keep her father back in her life." In "The Rickshank Rickdemption", Beth is heartbroken that Rick abandoned her again and is unhappy with the federation's new conditions as the medicine they provide makes horses healthier than ever, which affects her job. She is glad when Rick comes back home again, but Jerry, sick of Rick, forces her to choose between Rick and himself. Beth chooses Rick over Jerry, leading to their implied divorce. In "The ABC's of Beth", it is revealed that Beth shares the same sociopathic tendencies as her father. Rick offers to make Beth a clone of herself to tend to her family while she can explore the multiverse. In "The Rickchurian Mortydate", she begins to believe that she herself is the clone and goes to Jerry for help. Beth realizes that she loves Jerry and calls off the divorce, renewing her bond with her family and no longer insecure about Rick abandoning her again.

=== Summer Smith ===
Summer Smith (voiced by Spencer Grammer) is Morty's 17-year-old older sister, a more conventional and often superficial teenager, who is obsessed with improving her status among her peers. Summer is generally similar to her mother, and she is often shown to be very smart and humorous, but she has also shown elements of Jerry's approval-seeking. She occasionally expresses jealousy that Morty gets to accompany Rick on his inter-dimensional adventures. In the second season, she accompanies Rick and Morty on adventures more frequently and sometimes will even prove herself to be more competent than Morty, especially when emotional nuance is required. Summer has, on occasion, been shown to think similarly to Rick, such as quickly figuring out a way to save herself and Rick from execution and correctly deducing that dead flies in Rick's garage were more than they appeared. Summer cares about Rick and sees him as a hero, though he is often contemptuous and dismissive of her teenaged life perspective and values. In "The Rickshank Rickdemption", she is the only member of the family who wants to rescue Rick, despite the pleas of her brother that Rick is nothing more than a selfish jerk. When their parents agree on a divorce, Summer begins resenting her father and starts showing her dark side until she reconciles with him.

=== Prime Smith family ===
The Prime Smith family, consisting of Jerry, Beth, and Summer (voiced by Parnell, Chalke, and Grammer), were the main characters when Rick and Morty began, and as such were identical to the "current" Smith family. In "Rick Potion#9", they are left behind as Rick C-137 takes Morty to a new dimension to live after he irreparably turns everyone besides them into body horror mutants referred to as "Cronenbergs". By the time Morty Prime and the Summer return to his original dimension in the season 3 premiere, "The Rickshank Rickdemption", the sanity of the original Smiths seems to have eroded, as they attempt to kill Summer and hold Morty captive because of their association with Rick. On thawing out, having regained a semblance of sanity in the comic arc "Look Who's Cronenberging Now", Summer Prime sacrifices herself to stop the plans of an invading Coalition of Ricks. In the season 5 finale, Beth Prime is briefly seen in a Rick's 'crybaby backstory' as he crashes into their garage in his ship; in the season 6 premiere, "Solaricks", it is revealed that Beth Prime has also since died, leaving Jerry (now dubbed Apocalypse Jerry) alone. Having regained his humanity, Jerry spent his days reading and scavenging, rejecting Morty on his brief return and berating him for "leaving us to freeze", their residual injuries from having been frozen having been what led to Summer's sacrifice play (attributed to not having "thawed right") and Beth's death, until being killed by Rick Prime: the original Rick of the reality, with Rick C-137 having initially elected to live with the Prime Smith family and surrounding timelines out of a wish to track down Prime and kill him for having killed C-137's Diane and Beth (the latter as a child). Jerry Prime (now voiced by Manabu Muraji; Joe Daniels) returns in Rick and Morty: The Anime, in scenes set before his death, between the fifth and sixth seasons.

=== Space Beth ===
Space Beth Sanchez (voiced by Sarah Chalke) is another version of Beth presented as either the real Beth Smith, having elected to go to space and leave a clone on Earth in "The ABC's of Beth", or a clone herself, whom Rick sent to space after the real Beth elected to remain on Earth, with the status of which Beth is a clone and which is real remaining ambiguous throughout the series, on the character's official introduction in "Star Mort Rickturn of the Jerri". Regardless, "Space Beth" (known as "Space Mom" to Morty and Summer) is depicted as fighting a new and improved version of the Galactic Federation, having usurped Rick as the "Most Wanted" in the galaxy. However, Rick erased his memory so that he does not remember which Beth is the original and which is the clone, which results in both Beths not caring about the truth or about Rick. The episode "Hot Rick" reveals that Space Beth has a metal skull and a robotic spine that can be fixed as seen when Rick found that Beth snapped the neck of Space Beth and revived her by fixing her up.

=== Elle Smith ===
Elle Smith (voiced by Hitomi Sasaki in the Japanese version, Luci Christian in the English dub), born Alien Elle, is the lone survivor of an alien species who perceive all conceivable future branches of time. Introduced in Rick and Morty: The Anime, after falling in love with her reality's version of Morty named "Space Morty", who then died tragically, she had her reality's Rick reverse the entropy of time in an attempt to create an alternate reality in which Morty wouldn't die, as a result manifesting herself across infinity as a human, bearing Morty's daughter, Maria Smith.

== Main characters in President Curtis ==
=== Andre Curtis ===
President Andre Curtis (voiced by Keith David) is the President of the United States. While being jovial and friendly when not on the job, Curtis becomes a burden to Rick and Morty due to his frequent requests for their help in dealing with alien threats. Rick influences Curtis's decisions via the Rick-made robot owner of a BBQ restaurant the President frequents.

=== Roe Banks ===
Roe Banks (voiced by Stephanie Beatriz) is the White House Chief of Staff with cybernetics in her hair due to being a cyborg. This was the result of an accident at NuMind that occurred during an FBI raid.

=== Francis O'Doyle ===
Francis O'Doyle (voiced by Jim Rash) is a special agent in the United States Secret Service. He is by the book and is described to be part-leprechaun.

== Secondary characters ==
=== Relatives of the Smith–Sanchez family ===
- Diane Sanchez (voiced by Kari Wahlgren) – Diane was Rick's wife. She is seen in a flashback during the Season 3 premiere entering the garage with a young Beth. As Rick vows to give up science, they prepare to go for ice cream when Diane was killed by a bomb sent through a portal created by another Rick as revenge for the main Rick refusing to join him. Rick then decides to become a scientist again to avenge his family. An alternate version of Diane, Bonnie Sinclair, was created by cover artist Giahna Pantano in supplementary materials for the Rick and Morty Oni Press comic series. In the Season 7 episode "Unmortricken", Rick Prime reveals that he had personally killed Diane from every universe using the Omega Device.
- Mortimer "Morty" Smith Jr. (voiced by Finnegan Perry as a baby, Will Jennings as a child, Richard Christy as a teenager, and Maurice LaMarche as an adult) – Morty's half-Gazorpian son. He was conceived by Morty's extensive use of a sex robot "Gwendolyn" from the planet Gazorpazorp. Due to his Gazorpian heritage, Morty Jr. is extremely prone to violence, something Morty tries hard to discourage. By the end of the episode, he learns to channel his violent urges into writing and releases a book entitled "My ^{Horrible} Father" about Morty.
- Leonard and Joyce Smith (voiced by Dana Carvey and Patricia Lentz) – Jerry's parents. They have a cuckold relationship with Jacob. Leonard enjoys watching him and Joyce have sex while hiding in their bedroom closet, often while dressed as Superman. Leonard returns in the comic series Rick and Morty: Worlds Apart, a sequel to the fourth season episode "Claw and Hoarder: Special Ricktim's Morty", electing to help Morty and Balthazar after Rick is unavailable and Joyce goes on a cruise alone with Jacob. Joyce returns in the sixth season episode "Final DeSmithation", as Rick and Jerry successfully prevent one of Fortune 500's reality-altering fortune cookies from causing a forced incestuous encounter to occur between the duo.
- Jacob (voiced by Echo Kellum) – Joyce's lover. He appears to be a pleasant and friendly individual, though Jerry is uncomfortable with his cuckold relationship with his parents. In Worlds Apart, he goes on a cruise with Joyce, without Leonard.
- Hemorrhage (voiced by Joel McHale) – Summer's ex-husband. He appears as a muscle-bound, gruff-voiced raider with a helmet over his head, hiding his relatively normal face, and is shown to be very capable of driving with excellent shooting skills. Residing in the Post-Apocalyptic Dimension, after Rick ends the apocalypse, Summer leaves him for her home reality. After briefly tracking down Summer in her home dimension in the Rick and Morty comic series, attending high school for a spell, Hemorrhage returns in Rick and Morty Presents: Death Stalkers, finally making peace with Summer, and naming his adopted mutant daughter after her.
- The CHUD heir – The half-human, half-CHUD son of Rick and Princess Poñeta and heir to the CHUD throne.
- The Sperm Queen (voiced by Michelle Buteau) – The super-intelligent cyborg sperm daughter of Morty and leader of the Sperm Monsters.
- Naruto Smith – The gigantic biological offspring of Morty and Summer, born of a botched genetic experiment. Formally known as the Giant Incest Baby and the Giant Incest Monster (and originally nicknamed Sticky by Morty while in sperm form), Naruto was named by Summer after the title character of the manga of the same name. He is a parody of the star child from 2001: A Space Odyssey.
- Thoolie Smith – The half-human, half-"star seed" son of Morty and Cathy (Cthylla, daughter of Cthulhu) and heir to the Lovecraftian mythos, born to Morty at the conclusion of Rick and Morty vs. Cthulhu, revealed to be the baby featured at the end of the opening credits of every episode of the television series, who is nicknamed L'il Thoolie by Summer.
- Nana Smith (voiced by Maria Bamford) – The grandmother of Jerry Smith and great-grandmother of Morty and Summer Smith who is currently dead and living in Heaven.
- Slow Mobius (voiced by Chris Romano) – He was the uncle of Rick Sanchez, who had the power to alter time. Slow Mobius was first introduced in episode "Ricksy Business". He died in the episode "Unmortricken" when Rick Prime sent him into the Omega Device.
- Maria Smith (voiced by Saki Kobari in the Japanese version, Brittney Karbowski in the English dub) – Morty's and Elle's daughter from an alternate future, who is a famous violist. She is introduced in Rick and Morty: The Anime.

=== Harry Herpson High School staff and students ===
- Jessica W. (voiced by Kari Wahlgren) – Jessica is a student in Morty's math class. Morty has a crush on her, but she rarely acknowledges him. On the occasions she does, however, she seems to be level headed and kind to him. She attends the dance with him in "Big Trouble in Little Sanchez", and even goes on a date with Morty, after he had been temporarily purified in "Rest and Ricklaxation". While on another date with Morty in "Mort Dinner Rick Andre", Jessica is pulled into another dimension and experiences millennia while frozen in time. On being freed, Jessica elects to find meaning in her life, telling Morty that they should just be friends for now, before declaring herself a Time God. In Rick and Morty Presents: Mr. Nimbus, Jessica is depicted waging a one-woman war on Mr. Nimbus (who nicknames her Time Lord Jessica) for his role in her preservation (having forced Morty to go back for wine so many times), now equipped with time-altering powers, dooming various alternate versions of Rick and Nimbus to a living hell of reincarnation, romance, and murder.
- Principal Gene Vagina (voiced by Phil Hendrie) – The principal of Harry Herpson High School. He often reminds people that despite his humorous last name, he is "very much in charge", even though he often uses his full name talking about himself.
- Mr. Goldenfold (voiced by Brandon Johnson) – Mr. Goldenfold is Morty's math teacher. He takes his job very seriously, and is often seen loudly proclaiming the importance of mathematics to his class. He also has a multitude of deeply repressed sexual attractions, suffers from coprophagia, and his wife left him which he copes with by going to Jamba Juice. He also happens to be an expert blacksmith. An army of alternate superintelligent Goldenfolds from other dimensions are subsequently introduced in the Oni Press comic series arc The Space Shake Saga, as well as Goldenfold's niece, Noelle.
- Coach Feratu – The unseen gym teacher of Harry Herpson High School. He is a vampire who kills people at the school in order to feed. He is killed by Summer, Morty, and Tiny Rick offscreen. In the post-credits scene it is revealed that his real name is Balik Alistane, and his vampire superior is angered that he chose a human alias based on Nosferatu, a famous vampire film, instead of a normal-sounding pseudonym. The comic series Let the Rick One In revolves around Feratu's clan seeking revenge for his death, on behalf of his eternally-teenage son.
- Brad (voiced by Echo Kellum) – Brad is a student at Harry Herpson High School. He is a jock who plays football for the school and dates Jessica, and hates when other boys, especially Morty, try to talk to her. He does not appear in the second season. Jessica and Brad broke up in Season 3 Episode 6 "Rest and Ricklaxation" however it is implied they are trying to get back together at the end of the episode.
- Ethan (voiced by Daniel Benson) – Summer's ex-boyfriend. Rick uses him to build his new Anatomy Park after the first one explodes. He dumps Summer in order to try to get with Tricia Lange in "The Whirly Dirly Conspiracy", but fails. Out of spite for breaking Summer's heart, Morty deforms his body to show him how he made Summer feel.
- Nancy (voiced by Aislinn Paul) – An unpopular girl at the school whom Summer dislikes and attempts to get rid of during Rick's party in "Ricksy Business". She plays the flute in the school band, and costs Summer her newfound popularity after she tells the other partygoers about Summer's mistreatment of her.
- Toby Matthews (voiced by Alex Hirsch) – A popular boy at Harry Herpson High School whom Summer has a crush on. He enters a relationship with her thanks to her association with Tiny Rick, but breaks up with her once she gets Tiny Rick expelled in an attempt to save the real Rick's life.
- Frank Palicky (voiced by Ryan Ridley) – A psychopathic student at Harry Herpson High School whom Summer had a crush on. He acted as a frequent bully to Morty. Frank was frozen by Rick as he threatened to cut Morty with a switchblade. Despite Rick assuring Morty that he'd be fine and that he'll unfreeze him later, he toppled over and shattered as Summer approached to talk to him.
- MC Haps (voiced by Dan Harmon) – A student at the school who also happens to be a rapper. He is first seen performing a "flu-hating rap" at the Flu Season Dance during "Rick Potion #9", and can later be seen in the background at several other party scenes in the show.
- Tricia Lange (voiced by Cassie Steele) – A busty attractive girl who Ethan dumps Summer for in "The Whirly Dirly Conspiracy", but breaks up with Ethan near the end of the said episode. Tricia and Summer later become best friends, and she expresses sexual interest in Summer's father, Jerry, for his beekeeping profession.
- Bruce Chutback (voiced by Darren Criss) – He is new to the school in season 5. Morty met him in the math club and thereafter invited him to his house for a party. He's described as "the newest kid in school, just transferred", "hasn't done anything embarrassing yet", has "unlimited potential", no credit is perfect for him and is "the best".
- Jimmy
- Holly Hooks (voiced by Tara Strong)
- Big Doug
- Grace Smith (voiced by Reagan Gomez-Preston)
- Gordon Lunas (voiced by Maurice LaMarche)

=== Alternate-universe versions of the main characters ===
Different versions of the main characters inhabit other realities and dimensions. Other Ricks are mostly similar to the "main" Rick, though some have unique features which set them apart. Most other Mortys seen in the show are far more timid and weak-willed than the main Morty, an exception being Evil Morty.

- The Trans-Dimensional Council of Ricks – A parody of the Fantastic Four's Council of Reeds which acts as a governing body of sorts for the various versions of Rick inhabiting different timelines and dimensions. They are often at odds with Rick C-137 due to his refusal to cooperate with them (which he claims makes every Rick on the council less Rick than him), but they are otherwise shown to be on good terms with him, as a few council members were seen at Rick's party in "Ricksy Business". The council is killed by Rick in the season 3 premiere, "The Rickshank Redemption". "The Ricklantis Mixup" reveals that after the council's death the Citadel became a democratic government and that the council were really figure-heads for a shadowy Cabal of Ricks. It is revealed in "Rickmurai Jack" that Rick created the counsel as well as the citadel and the Central Finite Curve to separate dimensional travel to universes where Rick is the only smartest person while segregating the universes where he is not. The counsel has also been manipulating Beth and Jerry's relationship in other realities so Morty will be born for them to recruit and clone other Mortys for them as lackeys.
- Doofus Rick – The Rick of Dimension J-19 Zeta 7. He is a supposedly less intelligent Rick with buck teeth and a bowl cut, and allegedly comes from a universe in which everyone consumes their own feces. As he never fathered a Beth, he had his Morty assigned to him, "Eric Stoltz Mask Morty", from a dimension in which everyone has lionitis. He is much kinder than most other Ricks and befriends Jerry. In the comic series arc A Tale of Two Jerries, "Doofus Rick" is confirmed to be just as intelligent as any other Rick, developing portal fluid which can be used without a gun to return Jerry and himself to the latter's reality to prevent Doofus Rick's own Jerry from conquering the multiverse. In The Rickoning, Doofus Rick and other versions of him are revealed to have taken over the IllumiRicki, planning on taking out Rick C-137 and nearby versions of him so that he and Jerry can be together in peace.
- "Evil Morty" – Supposedly the Morty of Evil Rick; on his initial appearance, he wore an eyepatch, and did not speak much. His is later revealed to have been controlling "Evil Rick", and escapes among the thousands of other Mortys freed from captivity. In "The Ricklantis Mixup", this Morty takes on a new identity as Candidate Morty, and is elected President of the Citadel after a stirring speech for unity. He survives an assassination attempt by his former Campaign Manager Morty, after the manager learns his true identity. After election, the newly proclaimed President Morty proceeds to assassinate a shadow cabinet of Ricks who were the true power behind the scenes, and starts grand plans for reform and "action". His grand plan is revealed in "Rickmurai Jack" where he rigged portal fluid and the Operation Phoenix vats within the citadel and commits mass genocide to the other Rick and Mortys to fuel a device capable of destroying the Central Finite Curve so he'll escape to a reality not dominated by Rick, destroying the citadel in the process.
  - Evil Rick – Initially presented as Rick who supposedly comes from a dimension in which everyone is evil; he kills other Ricks to download the contents of their brains, and then hacks Rick C-137's portal gun to frame him for the crime. He created a database which sorts Ricks from most evil to least evil, and he and Rick C-137 are separated by a single Rick who Evil Rick describes as being "super weird". He is killed by the various Mortys he kidnapped and is then revealed to have a mind control device implanted in his brain, and that he had been controlled remotely by "his" Morty; in "Unmortricken", his death is revealed to have been a suicide.
- Alternate Beth and Jerry – Alternate versions of Beth and Jerry from Dimension C-500A in which Beth aborted Summer. They are both professionally successful, Jerry as a famous Hollywood actor and Beth as renowned surgeon (for humans rather than horses). Jerry is depicted as the best friend of Johnny Depp and engaging in sex with Kristen Stewart. However, despite their successes, both are shown to be deeply unhappy and personally unfulfilled. After Jerry has a breakdown and leads the police on a car chase, he travels to Beth's house and confesses that he loves her and regrets that she got the abortion; the two then embrace and seemingly decide to start anew together. This is seen on one of the channels that Rick and Morty watched.
- Campaign Manager Morty – The campaign manager of Candidate Morty. Campaign Manager Morty is fired for not having faith. While at a bar, Investigator Rick reveals to him that Candidate Morty had served as "Evil Morty" opposite "Evil Rick". Campaign Manager Morty unsuccessfully tries to assassinate Candidate Morty, but is detained and ejected into space through an airlock.
- Shadow Council of Ricks – A shadowy cabal of Ricks that has secretly controlled the Citadel since before the council. President Morty has most of them killed, rather than become their puppet, leaving only two alive. The corpses of those killed are ejected into space.
  - Rick D. Sanchez III – The CEO of Simple Rick's, a company that manufactures wafers flavoured with chemical secretions of Simple Rick's brain, which has the moment he realized Beth was his greatest creation played in his mind in an endless loop. After a factory worker Rick goes insane and murders Regional Manager Rick and indirectly murders Simple Rick, Rick D. Sanchez III seemingly saves the factory worker from imprisonment, he makes the factory worker the new Simple Rick. Rick D. Sanchez III is later seen at the Shadow Council's meeting with President Morty, who has most of them, including Rick D. Sanchez, shot dead.
- Cop Rick and Cop Morty – Two Citadel police officers. In contrast between the normal dynamic between Ricks and Mortys, Cop Rick is the more moral of the duo while Cop Morty is amoral and prejudiced against other Mortys. They discover the hideout of a street gang of Mortys, where Cop Rick is injured by a Morty he was trying to comfort. While Cop Rick treats his wound, Cop Morty kills all the Mortytown Locos, horrifying Cop Rick. Cop Morty takes Cop Rick to a strip club, revealing he is a corrupt cop under the payroll of Big Morty. Cop Rick's refusal to take a bribe results in a gunfight, where Cop Morty pins Big Morty on the ground, executing him. Cop Rick shoots Cop Morty and turns himself in, only to be let go and reinstated due to President Morty's changes to the department.
- Rick Prime – He is an alternate version of Rick first appearing in "The Rickshank Rickdemption", he approached Rick C-137 to introduce him to inter dimensional travel. But Rick refuses the offer by putting family over science, this angers Rick Prime and he apparently kills Diane and a young Beth in front of his eyes with a bomb. This traumatized Rick and made him invent his portal gun so he can scour the multiverve in search for Rick Prime to get revenge, but had no luck finding him and gave up. In the episode "Solaricks", it is revealed that he is actually from the Cronenberged dimension and Morty's biological grandfather.

=== Associates of Rick ===
- Mr. Meeseeks (voiced by Justin Roiland) – A race of blue humanoid creatures who all share the same name and personality. The Meeseeks are created from a metal box called a Meeseeks Box, and once they appear, whoever summoned them must give them a single simple task for them to fulfill, after which they disappear in a cloud of smoke. Meeseeks make their first appearance when Rick becomes tired of the family members asking him for favors, so he gives them the Meeseeks Box to have the Meeseeks do chores for him, but not before explaining that Mr. Meeseeks "are not Gods" and therefore their chores must be kept simple. Mr. Meeseeks are normally cheerful and cartoonish in personality, but if they spend too much time without fulfilling their given task, their sanity begins to wane and they can become dangerously psychotic, going to great lengths to see their task done, to the point of attempting murder on their summoner. This is because, according to the Meeseeks themselves, merely existing is physically and psychologically torturous to them, so the sooner they complete their tasks the sooner they can disappear. There are also Kirkland branded red Mr. Meeseeks, which are more surly and uncooperative compared to the blue versions.
- Scary Terry (voiced by Jess Harnell) – A murderous entity who resides in the dream world. He is a "legally safe" parody of Freddy Krueger and has miniature swords on his fingers instead of knives. He initially tries to kill Rick and Morty, but later befriends them after they help him with his own dream problems. He is very fond of the word "bitch", and injects it into almost every sentence. It is revealed that scaring is simply an occupation for him, and that he is very insecure about his capabilities, which puts him under great stress. Unlike Krueger, who was a human that was burned to death and then became a demonic ghost, Scary Terry is of a different species and his burnt appearance is a naturally occurring trait, as seen with his similarly "scary" wife and infant son, as well as the classmates and teacher seen in his dream.
- Dr. Xenon Bloom (voiced by John Oliver) – A sentient amoeba who co-founded Anatomy Park along with Rick. He is killed when the diseases of the park escape from captivity and overrun the park.
- Birdperson (voiced by Dan Harmon) – A superhero-like being who is Rick's best friend. He holds a deep respect for Rick, and often offers Morty insight when Morty considers doing something that would jeopardize his and Rick's relationship. Birdperson, Rick, and Squanchy were once freedom fighters against the Galactic Federation's oppression; their "crimes" led the Galactic Federation to issue warrants for their arrests. Birdperson marries Tammy Gueterman in the season 2 finale, but is killed by her after it is revealed that she is an undercover agent of the Galactic Federation sent to capture Rick and his associates. In the post-credits of the Season 3 premiere, Birdperson is turned into a cyborg called Phoenixperson by Tammy and the Federation after Rick destroys the Federation's economy and forces them to leave Earth. Phonenixperson confronts and battles Rick, almost killing him, until he is tricked by an invisible Jerry using Tammy's corpse and subsequently shut down by Beth. In "Rickternal Friendshine of the Spotless Mort", Rick succeeds in reviving Birdperson, though the two leave on a tense note, with Birdperson learning that he has a child with Tammy out there in Federation custody, and that Rick at first tried to hide the kid's existence until it was needed to help restore Birdperson's mind. Birdperson then leaves to rescue his child.
- Revolio "Gearhead" Clockberg, Jr. (voiced by Scott Chernoff) – A robotic-looking "gearperson". He is well-versed in an event that occurred on his home planet called the "Gear Wars" and can play an instrument similar to a lute. Despite being one of Rick's friends, Rick does not know his real name, preferring to call him "Gearhead", a racial epithet. Rick and Morty hide out at his house while fugitives for freeing Fart, and Gearhead betrays Rick by calling the police. Because of this, Rick beats him up and replaces his mouth gears with his "gearsticles". He has a somewhat effeminate voice, and a magazine entitled "Queer Gear" can be seen in his home, hinting that he is a gear-mosexual. Despite his betrayal, he is shown attending Rick's party in "Vindicators 3: The Return of Worldender", indicating that they are still friends. He catches Morty's Vindicators jacket after he tosses it away and is later shown attempting to pick up some gear women by pretending to be a part of the team. However, an actual disaster strikes, causing him to run away. He then trips on a pile of gears and falls, causing his arms and legs to break off.
- Squanchy (voiced by Tom Kenny) – A disheveled catlike creature who replaces various words in his sentences with the word "squanch". He is a parody of Snarf. Squanchy is one of Rick's best friends and wears a bracelet inscribed with "Rick's BFF". Squanchy, Birdperson, and Rick were once freedom fighters against the Galactic Federation's oppression; their "crimes" led the Galactic Federation to issue warrants for their arrests.
- Abradolf Lincler (voiced by Maurice LaMarche) – A being created by Rick. He has the DNA of both Abraham Lincoln and Adolf Hitler, which was intended to make him "a morally neutral super-leader". Instead, it renders him with conflicting emotions that he is unable to deal with. He initially seeks to be accepted as a son by his "father" Rick, who only regards him as a failed experiment. After Rick tries to get him killed in an alien environment, he swears revenge only to be picked up by the Testicle Monsters to be used as a sex toy in their orgy.
- Krombopulos Michael (voiced by Andy Daly) – A Gromflomite assassin who often purchases weapons from Rick. Although cheerful and friendly, he is also devoid of ethical restraint and has no qualms with killing anything or anyone, including children, old people and animals. He is accidentally crushed to death by Morty as the latter clumsily pilots Rick's ship into the building that Michael's target is imprisoned in. Krombopulos Michael is also revealed to have a wife, Amy, in which he ceremoniously kisses a locket with her picture, before embarking on his mission to kill his target, leading to his accidental death. In Rick Revenge Squad, Amy joins the titular squad in an attempt to avenge her husband.
- Unity (voiced by various; main body voiced by Christina Hendricks) – A hive mind whom Rick had previously dated, as they are two of the small handful of sentient beings capable of fully comprehending the scope of the universe. To spread to others, the hosts vomit a green liquid into the others' mouths which quickly incorporates them. Unity and Rick get back together, but Unity soon realizes that the self-destructive behavior they indulge in when they are together is bad for both of them, leading to Unity ending their relationship again. A distraught Rick attempts suicide, but fails. In "Air Force Wong", Unity returns to visit Rick and takes over the minds of the people of Virginia while asking Rick if he is going to go after "him".
- Blim Blam the Klorblok (voiced by John Kassir) – A large slug-like alien, who claims to be a murderer who eats babies and to have traveled to Earth to do so. He was captured and chained up by Rick in an attempt to cure Blim Blam's "space AIDS" in order to become rich selling the cure. He was discovered by Beth and Jerry, but the couple's bickering annoyed Blim Blam to the point that he broke free, berated the two using a translation device Rick had (since he could only speak in an alien language beforehand), and left, promising never to return to Earth.
- Wayne "Mr. Poopybutthole" (voiced by Justin Roiland in season 2–6, Jon Allen in season 7–present) – A Sausage Fella and longtime family friend. He is a parody of wacky side characters on television shows. Although he shows up at the same time as a group of Alien Parasites who take the forms of similarly zany characters, Mr. Poopybutthole himself is real. He is severely injured by Beth after she mistakes him for an Alien Parasite and shoots him. By the post-credits, Mr. Poopybutthole survives the wound and is undergoing physical therapy. Mr. Poopybutthole appears again in the post-credits scenes in Season 3 finale and has a wife named Amy and a son named Mr. Poopybutthole Jr. in the Season 4 episode "One Crew over the Crewcoo's Morty" as a college professor.
- Arthricia (voiced by Chelsea Kane) – A young alien girl who resembles an anthropomorphic cat person. She resides on a planet with an Amish style culture whose residents engage in an annual "purge". She first injures Rick, mugs Morty, and steals their ship in order to use it to kill the rich people who dominate her planet and enforce the purge amongst the poor. She is unable to fly it properly, so Rick gives her a robot suit and helps her kill the rich people after Morty gets too carried away with killing people and has to be subdued. Morty later asks her out, but she declines and claims that she already has a boyfriend.
- Gene Gilligan (voiced by Tom Kenny) is the next door neighbor of the Smith family. Introduced in the third season episode "The Whirly Dirly Conspiracy", being yelled at by Morty to "mind his own goddamn business", Gene is apparently killed in "Rickdependence Spray" after being run over by Rick, only to be revealed to be still alive in the fourth season episode "Rickternal Friendshine of the Spotless Mort", where he stumbles upon the garage while Rick is exploring Birdperson's mind, and the garage's A.I. promptly tries to get him to give it a power source so it can get its own body. Following the switch from Dimension C-131 to the Parmesan Dimension, the equivalent Gene is first seen in the sixth season episode "Night Family", walking his dog at night before being yelled at by Morty after Morty accidentally blows up the space cruiser. In "How Poopy Got His Poop Back", Gene is recruited by Rick to take part in Mr. Poopybutthole's intervention, which devolves into a "birthday party" guys' trip with Gene's cousin-in-law Hugh Jackman. Gene returns in "The Jerrick Trap", where he takes Jerry's rake without telling him, later awkwardly returning it while Jerry and Rick are merged into one single being.
- Mr. Nimbus (voiced by Dan Harmon) – The King of the Ocean, ruler of Atlantis, and Rick's arch-nemesis. Nimbus has a treaty with Rick for him to never touch the ocean, the breaking of which causes conflict between them. He also has hydrokinetic abilities and the power to control the police at a command. Nimbus has knowledge of Rick's past including the identity of his wife. In "Analyze Piss", Rick has a disastrous fight with Mr. Nimbus and Cookie Magneto. In the episode's post-credits, the Council of Orbship plan to approach Mr. Nimbus for membership into their group. He is a parody of Aquaman and Namor.

=== Superheroes and villains ===
- Concerto (voiced by Ryan Ridley) – A music-themed villain who only appears in the post-credits scene in "Pickle Rick". He attempts to crush Rick and Morty with the hammers on a giant piano, but is killed by Jaguar before he could do any harm to Rick or Morty.
- The Vindicators – A group of superheroes who band together to fight evil when it threatens to destroy the world. They enlisted Rick and Morty to help them defeat their nemesis, Worldender once before, but did not invite them back a second time due to "personality conflicts", resulting in mass casualties and 3 of them dying. Nearly all of them are killed when Rick, in a fit of drunken jealousy and contempt, sets up a Saw-style gauntlet to prove that the team is nothing but a bunch of one-dimensional hacks, causing most of the team to either die to Rick's traps, or kill each other when tensions and inner turmoil turn them against each other. They were later featured in the comic series Rick and Morty Presents: The Vindicators: Hero Mix Vol. 1, the prequel comic Vindicators 1: Origin of the Vindicators, two episodes of The Simpsons, and the spin-off animated series Vindicators 2: Last Stand Between Earth and Doom. They are a parody of various superhero groups, primarily the Avengers, but also the Guardians of the Galaxy, the Justice League, and the Teen Titans.
  - Vance Maximus, Renegade Starsoldier (voiced by Christian Slater) – The leader of the Vindicators. He presents himself as a suave, friendly and fun-loving leader, but Rick's death traps quickly causes him to reveal his true nature as a coward who cracks under pressure. He insults Morty as "the learning-disabled kid we do photo ops with", and then attempts to escape only to be killed by a trap. He is a parody of Iron Man and Star-Lord. In Rick and Morty Presents, a revived Maximus is incinerated by Boon.
  - Alan Rails (voiced by Lance Reddick) – A man who gained the ability to summon ghost trains after his parents were killed in a railroad accident. He wears a ghostly train whistle around his neck, which he uses to summon ghost trains. He is openly hostile towards Rick and is revealed to be the one who didn't want to invite him back to defeat Doomnometron. Million Ants kills him during a squabble about their love triangle with Supernova. He is a parody of Steel, with powers similar to Green Lantern. In Rick and Morty Presents, a revived Rails is crushed underfoot by Boon.
  - Supernova (voiced by Gillian Jacobs) – A star themed superheroine, who is the only surviving member of the Vindicators after she assisted Million Ants in killing her ex-husband Alan Rails, then later killed her lover Million Ants. It is unknown whether Rick exposed her crimes or if she is still a hero after she escaped. She is most likely a parody of Starfire with a design like Singularity. In Rick and Morty Presents, a revived Supernova is partially incinerated by Boon.
  - Crocubot (voiced by Maurice LaMarche) – A cyborg crocodile. Little is known about him save for his cold mechanical-reptilian logic, and that Rick made a joke about him falling into a vat of redundancy. He dies in one of Rick's death traps when he tries to answer a question using common logic, when not taking into account the illogical answer that only Morty would know. In Rick and Morty Presents, a revived Crocubot has his heart ripped out by Pickle Rick.
  - Million Ants (voiced by Tom Kenny) – A sentient ant colony who was originally given sentience by Supernova and became her adulterous lover when they were trapped on a planet for several days with no way of knowing if they would survive. He is killed by Supernova who crushes the queen ant after he tries to reason with her after she attempts to kill Rick and Morty. He is likely a parody of Ant-Man but bears more of a resemblance to Swarm and Clayface. In Rick and Morty Presents, a revived Million Ants is blown up by Death Stalkers.
  - Noob Noob (voiced by Justin Roiland) – The Vindicators' intern and janitor, who appears to be a Sausage Fella except with asymmetrical eyes. He wishes to eventually become a full-fledged Vindicator, but is always made to stay behind and clean up their ship. Rick appreciates him more than the other Vindicators because he laughs at Rick's jokes. While drunk, Rick claims to have more love for him than Morty, only to apparently forget who Noob Noob is after recovering. In Rick and Morty Presents, Noob Noob becomes the supervillain Boon, before being torn apart by an army of Mr. Meeseeks.
- Planetina (voiced by Alison Brie) – An environmental-themed superhero whom Morty dates. She is a parody of Captain Planet from Captain Planet and the Planeteers, although lacking a heart ring. Although she and Morty initially bond closely, Morty is forced to break up with her after she becomes more unstable and ruthless in her activism, much to the grief of both.
- Tina-Teers – The Tina-Teers were the original owners of the rings associated with Planetina. By the time they were adults, they became more obsessed with money-making. While meeting with the Ambassador of Saudi Arabia, they were all killed by Morty who stole the rings associated with Planetina.
  - Eddie – (voiced by Steve Buscemi) – A member of the Tina-Teers who wielded the fire ring.
  - Xing Ho (voiced by Lauren Tom) – A member of the Tina-Teers who wielded the earth ring.
  - Unnamed air ring wielder (voiced by Lauren Tom) – A member of the Tina-Teers who wielded the air ring.
  - Unnamed water ring wielder (voiced by Brandon Johnson) – A member of the Tina-Teers who wielded the water ring.
- Arabic Ambassador (voiced by Dan Harmon) – The ambassador of Saudi Arabia.
- Diesel Weasel (voiced by Rob Schrab) – Diesel Weasel is an evil mutant Weasel who causes acid rain.
- The Ferret Pilots – A group of teenagers animated in anime style who were the original pilots of the Gotron ferrets, large ferret-like vehicles. They kidnap Morty and initially try to bribe him with Boob World currency in exchange for insider information about Rick's operation, but when he resists, he is forced to fight off an assassination attempt. Later they captured Rick in the GoGotron, a large robot made by the merging of all the Gotron ferrets. Naruto Smith destroys the GoGotron, kills all the ferret pilots and rescues Rick. They are a parody of Voltron and Power Rangers.
  - Kendra (voiced by Lauren Tom) – A red-haired anime-like character who is the leader of the pilots from the five realities. She was hired by Rick, who did not know her real identity, to take control of the GoGotron. She later betrays and captures him in the GoGotron.
- The Self-Referential Six – A group of beings whose reality-warping abilities are based around narrative techniques and devices.
  - Miss Lead (voiced by Cassie Steele) – A member of the Referential Six whose abilities and name are a play on "mislead".
  - Flash Back (voiced by Brandon Johnson) – A member of the Referential Six whose abilities and name are a play on "flashback".
  - Connie TinuityError (voiced by Kari Wahlgren) – A member of the Referential Six whose abilities and name are a play on "continuity error".
  - Protago Nick (voiced by Nolan North) – A member of the Referential Six whose abilities and name are a play on "protagonist".
  - Mr. Twist (voiced by Rob Schrab) – A member of the Referential Six whose abilities revolve around plot twists.
  - Brett Caan/Rhett Caan (voiced by Maurice LaMarche) – A member of the Referential Six whose abilities and name are a play on "retcon". Anything he says comes true.
  - Tag Man (voiced by Justin Roiland) – An enormous and cheerful creature whose name is based on a "tag". He is seen during the post-credits fighting different opponents.
- Cookie Magneto (voiced by John Early) – A parody of Magneto who can control cookies. He is killed by Rick.
- Mr. Calypso (voiced by Tom Kenny) – A parody of Mister Mxyzptlk.
- Mr. String Bean (voiced by Tom Kenny) – A stringbean-themed cheesy villain.
- Doctor Buckles (voiced by Chaz Langley) – A cheesy villain.
- Pissmaster (voiced by Will Forte) – Eugene Michael Piss is an alien supervillain who wears an armored suit that enables him to shoot urine out of the gloves. After being badly beaten up by Jerry for wanting to violate Summer, Pissmaster was later found dead in his bathtub with a suicide note. Rick briefly assumes his identity to make Pissmaster a martyr.
- Pissmaster's Daughter (voiced by Cassie Steele) – The unnamed daughter of Pissmaster.
- The Council of Orbship - A group of galactic heroes. They sought out Jerry in "Analyze Piss" after he defeated Pissmaster. In the episode's post-credits, the council of Orbship plan to approach Mr. Nimbus for membership into their group.
- Blagnar the Eternal (voiced by Diedrich Bader) – The large-headed leader of a council of intergalactic superheroes.
- The Legion of Hitlers – A group of Adolf Hitler-type beings who reside on a Hitler-themed planet. They are all killed by Jerry.
  - Grasshopper Hitler – A grasshopper version of Adolf Hitler.
  - Gorilla Hitler – A gorilla version of Adolf Hitler and member of the Legion of Hitlers. He is a parody of Gorilla Grodd.
  - Old Hitler – The human Adolf Hitler of Earth who faked his death.
  - Blue Greek Hitler – A blue Greek version of Adolf Hitler.
  - Riddler Hitler – A member of the Legion of Hitlers. He is a parody of Riddler.
  - Red Alien Hitler – A red alien version of Adolf Hitler.
  - Robot Alien Hitler – A robotic alien version of Adolf Hitler.

=== Characters seen on inter-dimensional cable ===
The following characters are seen when Rick and Morty watch the inter-dimensional cable in the episodes "Rixty Minutes" and "Interdimensional Cable 2: Tempting Fate":

- Alternate David Letterman (voiced by Jeff Bergman) – A version of David Letterman from Dimension C-500A.
- Ants-In-My-Eyes Johnson (voiced by Justin Roiland) – A man with ants crawling inside his eyes who owns an electronics store. He is completely blind because of this and has no sensation of touch either.
- Real Fake Doors salesman (voiced by Justin Roiland) – A man who sells doors which are incapable of opening. He is filmed on his commute home and continues there.
- Glenn (voiced by Justin Roiland) – A man who eats feces, and stars in a movie about it. In what is likely supposed to be a plot twist, he is served with a court order barring him from feces consumption.
- Gazorpazorpfield and Jon (voiced by Justin Roiland and Tom Kenny respectively) – Characters from the Gazorpian TV show Gazorpazorpfield, a parody of Garfield. Gazorpazorpfield, being a male Gazorpian, is extremely aggressive and profane by nature and is shown verbally abusing his owner Jon. His favorite food is enchiladas.
- Tophat Jones (voiced by Justin Roiland) – A parody of Lucky the Leprechaun, the mascot of Lucky Charms with ears similar to the Trix Rabbit. Tophat Jones is the mascot for "Strawberry Smiggles". He is shown eating a bowl of them and feeling content at the fact that since he has done so, no one else will be able to have any. He is brutally eviscerated by two children, who eat cereal from his stomach and intestines.
- Two Brothers – A pair of brothers who star in an action film in which they deal with such threats as meteors, a tornado, a giant cat monster, a Mexican armada with tomato weapons, elderly gladiator women, and the moon colliding with the planet. The brothers are stated to have a very strong bond.
- Baby Legs and Regular Legs (voiced by Justin Roiland and Rob Paulsen respectively) – A buddy cop duo consisting of a man with legs the size of an infant's and another man who appears to be physically normal. Baby Legs attempts to prove that he is not inhibited by his small legs, but fails to catch a criminal. The criminal is promptly subdued by Regular Legs and Baby Legs learns to accept the fact that he needs a regular-legged partner.
- Mrs. Sullivan – A cat lady that is featured in the trailer for "Last Will and Testimeow: Weekend at Dead Cat Lady's House II" (a parody of Weekend at Bernie's), which was written and directed by the Jerry Smith of Dimension C-500A. After she dies, her cats control her body like a puppet to make it look like that she is still alive and can remain on the estate.
- The Eyeholes Man (voiced by Justin Roiland) – The mascot of "Eyeholes" cereal as seen in "Interdimensional Cable 2: Tempting Fate". He is a blue-skinned alien in a superhero costume who beats up anyone who attempts to eat his cereal as seen in a commercial where two eyeless lovers were attacked by him for wearing Eyeholes on their face. Rick advises Morty not to get caught with a box of Eyeholes or else the Eyeholes Man will crash through a window and beat him up. In the post-credits, the Eyeholes Man assaults Jerry upon catching him with a box of Eyeholes that were in Rick's cupboard.
- Jan Michael Vincent – A real-life American actor who, in-universe of an alternate reality, stars in a film called Jan Quadrant Vincent 16.
- Stealy (voiced by Justin Roiland) – A Sausage Fella but with disproportionately long arms. He stars in his own television show, in which he engages in kleptomania (and sometimes even drugging and kidnapping). He measures the worth of his loot in "brapples", which appear to be hybrids of roosters and apples.
- Little Dipper – A Tinymouth who advertised the restaurant Lil' Bits, which serves tiny-sized food for people with tiny mouths.
- Michael and Pichael Thompson (both voiced by Justin Roiland) – Conjoined twins who each have their own television shows. Michael is a news anchor while Pichael hosts a cooking show. They have a great amount of resentment towards one another, and the fact that they both tape their shows at the same time leads to difficulties and on-set fights between the two.
- Octopus Man – A marine biologist who was bitten by an octopus, causing half of his left arm and torso become octopus-like.
- Phillip Jacobs – The host of The Personal Space Show. Really cares about his personal space.

=== White House staff ===
The following are the staff members of the White House in President Curtis:

- Janice (voiced by Alanna Ubach) - The secretary to President Curtis. The episode "David" reveals that she is a member of the Camp David Lifers.
- Dr. Kenny Finch (voiced by David Cross) - An inventor and scientist who works at the White House. He creates inventions that help President Curtis out.
- Alan Chomps (voiced by Dan Bakkedahl) - A special agent who once covered for O'Doyle. After being bitten by a member of the Werewolf Syndicate, Chomps becomes a werewolf. Dr. Finch recruits Chomps to work as President Curtis' paranormal agent, giving him a collar to control his powers.
- Mike (voiced by Nat Faxon) - A White House accountant. The episode "David" reveals that he is a member of the Camp David Lifers.
- Chief Usher Cherri (voiced by Janeane Garofalo) - The White House Chief Usher and member of the Camp David Lifers.
- Chef Matteo (voiced by Jon Glaser) - The White House Executive Chef and member of the Camp David Lifers. He was killed by David the Water Witch.
- Sandra (voiced by Kerri Kenney) - The White House caterer and member of the Camp David Lifers. She was killed by David the Water Witch.
- Kyle and Lisa (voiced by Nick Reczynski and Debra Wilson) - Two secret service members who are the first victims of David the Water Witch.

=== Alien ethnic groups ===
- The Zigerions – A race of highly intelligent alien scammers who routinely abduct Rick and place him into virtual simulations in an attempt to get his recipe for concentrated dark matter. They are very uncomfortable with nudity, though they did manage to create an accurate model of Morty, complete with genitalia. Having known from the beginning that he was in a double-layered simulation and tired of dealing with the Zigerions, Rick gives them a fake recipe for concentrated dark matter which causes their ship to explode.
  - Prince Nebulon (voiced by David Cross) – The prince of the Zigerions. The Zigerions being uncomfortable with nudity is a reference to Cross' character on Arrested Development having a similar issue.
  - Kevin (voiced by Dan Harmon) – A nerdy-looking Zigerion who was made to spy on Morty while he was nude in order to create an accurate representation of his genitals for their simulation.
- The Plutonians – The citizens of planet Pluto. Most of the Plutonians refuse to believe that their home is no longer a planet.
  - King Flippy Nips (voiced by Rich Fulcher) – The king of the Plutonians.
  - Scroopy Noopers (voiced by Nolan North) – A Plutonian scientist and outcast who is later revealed to be Flippy Nips's son.
- Unity's Hosts – An unnamed race of blue-skinned humanoid aliens whose minds Unity has taken over and assimilated into her collective conscience. As Unity's control over them begins to weaken, they begin a race war amongst themselves due to having differently shaped nipples.
- Alien Parasites – The Alien Parasites can take the forms of wacky side characters and insert themselves into peoples' memories to convince them that they have always known them, parodying sitcoms and their tendency to introduce new characters to boost ratings. They multiply very quickly and must be contained to prevent them from taking over or destroying the world. Their only weakness is that they cannot create negative memories, since they feed on the chemicals the brain produces from positive feelings. The Smith family take advantage of this and kill the Alien Parasites.
  - Amish Cyborg – An Amish cyborg. Unlike the other parasites, it seems that at least part of his guise (the cybernetic implants) were an actual part of his body.
  - Baby Wizard – An infant wizard who supposedly hooked up the Duck with Muscles with his future wife.
  - Bigfoot
  - Cleopatra
  - Cousin Nicky (voiced by Ryan Ridley) – A supposed relative of the Smith family from Brooklyn. He is a parody of various New Yorker stereotypes and his catchphrase is "I'm walkin' here!" (a line used by Dustin Hoffman's character Enrico Rizzo in Midnight Cowboy).
  - Duck Guy or Duck with Muscles – An unnamed rubber duck with muscular arms. Baby Wizard was said to have hooked Duck with Muscles up with a woman that would eventually become his wife.
  - Elvis Impersonator – An Alien Parasite in the form an Elvis Presley impersonator.
  - Frankenstein's Monster (voiced by Kevin Michael Richardson) – A variation of the monster from Frankenstein who is a member of the Smith family. He is said to be a veteran of the Vietnam War, having served with Rick.
  - Ghost in a Jar – A tiny green ghost who resides in a jar. Rick states that he is good at explaining obscure jokes for people that do not get them.
  - Hamurai (voiced by Kevin Michael Richardson) – A samurai that wears armor made of ham, steaks, sausages, and bacon strips. He went to college with Reverse Giraffe.
  - Mr. Beauregard (voiced by Tony Barbieri) – The Smith family's butler. In one flashback, he dresses up as Morty's date to the prom, frees Jerry's head from the stair handrails with marmalade, and fights a Nazi in another. A variation of Beauregard is seen as Satan's butler in Rick and Morty Go to Hell.
  - Mrs. Refrigerator (voiced by Kevin Michael Richardson) – A female anthropomorphic refrigerator. She is one of the first parasites who is found out by the family, and attempts to pass a roller coaster ride off as a negative memory in a state of panic, only to try and run once Beth points out the flaw in her statement.
  - Pencilvester (voiced by Tom Kenny) – An anthropomorphic pencil. Rick takes a liking to this particular parasite and instructs Morty to kill him as he is unable to bring himself to do it.
  - Photography Raptor – A Utahraptor who is constantly taking pictures and cannot communicate verbally.
  - Reverse Giraffe (voiced by Keith David) – An eloquent-speaking giraffe with a short neck, stubby legs, and a long body. He stated that he went to college with Hamurai, saved Ghost in a Jar's life in Vietnam, and had been a shoulder for Beth to cry on.
  - Sleepy Gary (voiced by Matt Walsh) – A tired man in pajamas and a nightcap who is portrayed as Beth's husband and Jerry's best friend/secret lover. Sleepy Gary yearns to divorce Beth so that he can be with Jerry.
  - Tinkles (voiced by Tara Strong) – A magical flying ballerina lamb with a rainbow unicorn horn who is Summer's imaginary friend. She is stated to live in "Never-Past-Bedtime Land" with numerous similar creatures like a bear parka-wearing bird, a butterfly/sunflower hybrid, a Chowder lookalike, a cloud yeti, an Easter bunny/monkey hybrid, a headphones-wearing dragon, a hoodie-wearing slug, a sunglasses-wearing strawberry, a sweatband-wearing star, and a winter-wear turtle. In the "Morty's Mind Blowers" comic sequel, a real Tinkles is revealed to have existed before accidentally being shot by Morty.
  - Uncle Steve (voiced by Tony Barbieri) – The supposed older brother of Jerry.
  - William Shakespeare
  - Unnamed characters – The forms of the alien parasites that were unnamed. These forms consist of:
    - An astronaut
    - A bearded lady
    - A British Guard
    - A burglar
    - A caveman
    - A chef
    - A flamingo
    - A fruit hat girl similar to Carmen Miranda
    - A giant robot
    - A girl robot
    - A girl scout
    - A gnome
    - A Harlem Globetrotter
    - A humanoid scar-faced bear with kidneys that would be compatible to Beth's
    - A humanoid catfish
    - A humanoid fox
    - A humanoid sun
    - A humanoid unicorn
    - A Japanese businessman
    - A kaiser that resembles Wilhelm II
    - A lucky cat
    - A Mexican man
    - A Mr. Peanut lookalike
    - A mushroom head
    - A nun
    - A party hat-wearing snake
    - A pink balloon animal
    - A rooster
    - A Scottish Braveheart warrior
    - A sea captain in rain gear
    - A small cowboy riding a dog
    - A snorkel kid
    - A space monkey
    - A trashcan-wearing homeless puppet
    - A William Wallace look-alike
- The Cromulons (voiced by Justin Roiland) – A race of bald-headed planet-sized alien heads who "feed off the talent and showmanship of less-evolved lifeforms". They transport planets to the expanse of the universe they inhabit and make the residents perform on a talent competition show that they run called Planet Music, with planets that lose or get disqualified being disintegrated by a massive laser cannon. When Rick and Morty win the competition, the Cromulons declare their song the best they have ever heard and decide to end their show after 988 seasons. The general population led by Principal Vagina mistake them for gods and begins to worship them as such until the truth was known.
- The Alphabetrians – A race of aliens whose bodies are composed of an elemental material and shaped like a letter of the alphabet letters from the planet Alphabetrium.
  - Ice-T (voiced by Dan Harmon) – A famous rapper who is tasked with helping Rick and Morty to write a song. Though he initially appears to just be human, he is revealed to be an Alphabetrian. He was originally known as Water-T, but was frozen by his father Magma-Q as punishment for his apathetic outlook on life. Rick inspires Ice-T to care about things and he saves Earth by using his body to deflect the Cromulons' laser. As a reward for his altruistic deed, he is welcomed back by his home planet and returned to his true form as Water-T. After his father is killed in a Numbericon attack, Water-T leads the Alphabetrians into battle against the Numbericons.
  - Magma-Q (voiced by Justin Roiland in "Get Schwifty", Ice-T in "Water-T and the Rise of the Numbericons: The Movie") – The ruler of Alphabetrium who previously froze Water-T into ice and banished him. After thawing out Water-T, Magma-Q was killed when the Numbericons attacked.
  - Hydrogen-F – A member of the Alphabetrian Elders.
  - Magnesium-J (voiced by Justin Roiland in "Get Schwifty", Troy Baker in "Water-T and the Rise of the Numbericons: The Movie") – A member of the Alphabetrian Elders.
  - Lithium-P (voiced by Ryan Ridley) – A member of the Alphabetrians. He is the one who informs Magma-Q and the Alphabetrian elders that the Numbericons are attacking. In "Water-T and the Rise of the Numbericons: The Movie", Lithium-P accompanies Water-T in seeking out Mr. Goldenfold.
- The Numbericons – A race of aliens whose bodies are shaped like a number. They attack Alphabetrium.
  - Emperor Dread Nought (voiced by Troy Baker) – The ruler of the Numbericons. He is later killed when 8 becomes Infinity.
  - Sinistar 7 (voiced by Debra Wilson) – A member of the Numbericons and the daughter of Emperor Dread Nought.
  - Decimal Point (voiced by Rob Schrab) - The personal assistant of Emperor Dread Nought.
  - 8/Infinity (voiced by Peter Serafinowicz) – A member of the Numbericons. He was actually a spy who was planted into the Alphabetrians, posing as Oxygen-S. He later took on the powers of Infinity, killing Emperor Dread Nought and most of the Alphabetrians and Numbericons. It took the united power of the Alphabetrians and the Numbericons to slay him.
- The Gromflomites - The Gromflomites are insectoid aliens from the planet Gromflom Prime. They were the leading race in the Galactic Federation until Rick called a downfall in the organization.
  - Galactic Federation President (voiced by Maurice LaMarche) - The unnamed Gromflomite leader of the Galactic Federation. After Rick reduced their currency to 0, the Galactic Federation President committed suicide by shooting himself in the head with a laser.
  - Glenn (voiced by Eric Bauza) - A Gromflomite with a wife and kids who Morty killed in the pilot episode when Rick claimed that Gromflomites were robots.
  - Krombopulos Michael (voiced by Andy Daly) - A Gromflomite agent who purchased weapons from Rick in "Mortynight Run".
  - Cornvelious Daniel (voiced by Nathan Fillion) - A Gromflomite agent who used a device to enter Rick's mind through the Brainalyzer in order to get the information of inter-dimensional travel from Rick after he surrendered to the Galactic Federation. After uploading a virus into the Brainalyzer, Rick took control of Cornvelious David's body and left the real one's conscious in Rick's body to die as Rick turns off the Brainalyzer where the body was later shot by SEAL Team Rick.
  - Cisco (voiced by Eric Bauza) - A Gromflomite that works at the Gromflomite Department of Transportation and serves as one of Rick's contacts. Rick's relationship with Cisco is on the same level as Birdperson.
  - Fantabulous (voiced by Nolan North) - A Gromflomite who worked as the royal doctor to the Gromflomite Queen. He developed a fungus that turned Gromflomites into their stronger form called Ultromflomites. The Gromflomite Queen declined his proposal to make use of it causing Fantabulous to have her killed. Fantabulous was later killed when the Ultromflomite hive was destroyed by Rick and Space Beth.
  - Ronkonkomus Joe (voiced by Stephen Root) - A Gromflomite general who allies with Rick and Space Beth against Fantabulous
- The Sausage Fellas - A race of short sausage-shaped humanoids. Mr. Poopybutthole is a Sausage Fella.
- The Monogatrons – The Monogatrons are a race of aliens. They created the Lovefinderzz app to distract the humans while they plot to steal Earth's water supply.
  - Monogatron King (voiced by Sam Neill) – The King of the Monogatrons that wants to conquer Earth.
  - Monogatron Queen (voiced by Kathleen Turner) – The Queen of the Monogatrons and the wife of the Monogatron King. She enjoys podcasts and arguing with her husband.
  - Glootie (voice by Taika Waititi) – Rick's Monogatron intern.
- Space Snakes – A sapient snake-like species.
- Glorzo – A race of face-hugging parasites.
- The Hell Demons – A race of gross-looking demons who have feelings opposite to what they are supposed to feel. They are a parody of the Cenobites from the Hellraiser franchise.
- The Changeformers – A race of robots able to transform themselves into vehicles according to need. They mistake Rick's car to be one of them and later try to kill her along with Morty and Summer when they realise the truth. They are a parody of the Transformers.
- The Mailboxians – A race of mailbox-like aliens.
- The Googa Aliens – Two races of aliens who arrived in the 15th century CE in America. They were at war at first but later united due to their common hate against turkeys. They defeated the dinosaur-like turkey monsters that once dominated America, saving the continent's humans. They went into hibernation into chambers in the "crypt of the new world" in Washington DC, described as America's oldest secret by the President. Later in the 21st century, they were resurrected by Rick and the President to fight an army of genetically enhanced turkeys.
- The Sun inhabitants – A race of humanoids who reside in a city above the Sun.
  - The King of the Sun (portrayed by Maurice LaMarche) – The unnamed ruler of the Sun who Morty succeeds after defeating him.
  - The Knights of the Sun (portrayed by Matt King, David Mitchell, Daniel Radcliffe, and Robert Webb) – The defenders of the Sun.
- The Viscount of Venus (voiced by Jack Black) – The unnamed representative of Venus.
- The Earl of Earth (voiced by Nolan North) – The unnamed representative of Earth who Morty mistook for Santa Claus.
- The Marquis of Mars (voiced by Eric Bauza) – The unnamed representative of Mars.
- The Spaghetti People - A race of humans who reside on the planet 41-Kepler B. They get their name because their suicide turns their intestines to spaghetti.
  - The Madame President (voiced by Debra Wilson) - The President of 41-Kepler B.
- The Space Christians - A race of alien Christians. They are not into sex and are out to prevent the Easter Bunnies from inducing it on different worlds enough to cause the world's destruction.
  - Christopher "Chris" General Reinhard Kincaid (voiced by Ebon Moss-Bachrach) - A top soldier of the Space Christians.
- The People of Plociff - The People of Plociff are a race of pointy-eared human-shaped aliens who escaped from their doomed planet of Plociff on their sleeper ship. They have been divided into the ruling class "Takey" and the working class "Makey".
  - Guffy Chachaco (voiced by Maurice LaMarche) - A "Makey" janitor who collaborated with Jimmy Johnson to steal all of their kinds' money during cryosleep.
  - Jamerson Family - A family of "Takeys".
    - Doug Jamerson (voiced by Nolan North) - The patriarch of the Jamerson family.
    - Karen Jamerson (voiced by Maria Bamford) - The matriarch of the Jamerson family.
    - Jimmy Jamerson (voiced by Eric Bauza) - The son of Doug and Karen Jamerson who collaborated with Guffy Chachaco.
  - Plociff Doctor (voiced by Maurice LaMarche) - An unnamed doctor who is one of the "Takeys".
  - Spoogler (voiced by Troy Baker) - One of the "Makeys".
  - Tibs (voiced by Maria Bamford) - One of the "Makeys".
  - Zoologist (voiced by Rob Schrab) - An unnamed zoologist of indeterminate class whose monkey Lizzy dies in cryosleep. By the post-credits, the zoologist obtains a new monkey that he names New Lizzy.
- The People of Beloi 6E - The People of Beloi 6E live on a less technological planet that is similar to Earth.
  - Antonio (voiced by Oscar Nunez) - An inhabitant from Beloi 6E.
  - Big Mike (voiced by Ed Helms) - An inhabitant of Beloi 6E.
  - Little Mike (voiced by Paul Lieberstein) - An inhabitant of Beloi 6E.
  - Bowser (voiced by Rob Riggle) - An inhabitant of Beloi 6E.
  - Marjorie (voiced by Amy Ryan) - An inhabitant of Beloi 6E who runs a bowling alley.

=== Earthly non-human ethnic groups ===
- The Mega-Gargantuans – The Mega-Gargantuans are an ironically named miniature civilisation located in the Amazon rainforest, with whom Rick and Morty broker peace accords.
  - The Presidentress (voiced by Tara Strong) – The elected leader of the Mega-Gargantuans, who separately meets with the President, and Rick and Morty, for peace talks.
- The CHUDs – The CHUDs (Cannibalistic Horse Underground Dwellers) are a race of horses. They dwell in their kingdom underground.
  - CHUD King (voiced by Maurice LaMarche) – The King of the CHUDs who had grievances against Rick for the latter sleeping with his daughter.
  - Princess Poñeta (voiced by Christina Ricci) – The daughter of the CHUD King who has a child with Rick.
- The Turkeys – A group of normal turkeys which got enhanced by the "Turkey President" in order to create a new master race that would overthrow humans. The enhanced turkeys, known as Gobblers, varied in size from human-sized to gigantic tower-sized beasts. They were sentient, well built and used firearms. The turkeys and the Gobblers were all later killed by the Googa aliens with aid from Rick, Morty and the real President.
  - The Turkey President (voiced by Keith David) – The Turkey leader who by coincidence swallowed the pill given to the real President for identification purposes. After being infused with human DNA, it took the President's form and took his place as the President of the United States. He enhanced other turkeys, converting them into super soldiers. The imposter was killed by the real President later.
- The Turkey Monsters – An ancient race of dinosaur-like turkeys who were the original rulers of America. They were "merciless beasts, grazing on the corpses of cowering humans."

== Other characters ==
=== Humans in Rick and Morty ===
- Paul Fleishman (voiced by Ryan Ridley) – A man that appeared in the episode "Mortynight Run". He comes from an alternate time line where Jerry and Beth divorced and Beth got remarried to him.
- Davin (voiced by Dan Harmon) – Beth's extremely handsome co-worker at the horse hospital. Jerry dislikes him intensely because he sees him as a threat to his and Beth's sometimes shaky marriage. The original Jerry killed a mutated version of him in "Rick Potion #9", but the other version from the replacement universe is supposedly alive despite being unseen.
- Ruben (voiced by Jess Harnell) – A homeless Street Santa whose body contains "Anatomy Park", Rick's human body themed amusement park. He dies of tuberculosis with the miniaturized Anatomy Park crew, as well as Morty, still inside of him. In order to help them escape, Rick takes Ruben's corpse into orbit, enlarges it to a gigantic size so that Morty and Annie (the only survivors) can exit through the left nipple, and then blows it up.
- Annie (voiced by Jackie Buscarino) – An employee at Anatomy Park who works at a churro stand. She and Morty are the only survivors of the disease outbreak in the park. She initially ignores Morty, but later grows fond of him when he saves her life and makes out with him while the two of them watch a movie. At the end of the episode, Rick shrinks her down to lead the construction of a new Anatomy Park after she tells him that she studied all of Dr. Bloom's notes.
- Poncho (voiced by Gary Anthony Williams) – Dr. Bloom's bodyguard who is responsible for the disease outbreak in Anatomy Park. He betrays Bloom as revenge for the horrible employee benefits he received, and is killed when the bubonic plague virus he is carrying turns on him and causes him to fall off of a high balcony. Before the betrayal, he defended the group from Hepatitis A, tuberculosis, and killed gonorrhea with advice from Morty; it can only be assumed that he was just saving himself and was playing along until he escaped the park, but this was fouled up by Morty who discovers the bubonic plague in his backpack. Poncho planned on making himself wealthy by selling the plague to the highest bidder; mentioning Al Quida, North Korea, Republicans, Shriners, balding men who workout, and people on the internet only turned on by cartoons of Japanese teenagers, were the most likely bidders for the ability to decimate the population.
- Tammy Gueterman (voiced by Cassie Steele) – A deep cover Galactic Federation agent who poses as a classmate of Summer, getting into a romantic relationship with Birdperson. At their wedding, she shoots him after revealing her true identity, and Federation troops arrive to arrest Rick and his friends. She later oversees Birdperson's transformation into a cyborg, renamed Phoenixperson. In "Star Mort Rickturn of the Jerri," she leads an invasion force to capture the version of Beth that has been leading a rebellion and destroy Earth. Though she succeeds in ensnaring both Beths, Rick ultimately kills her with Summer's help as revenge for making Rick go to a wedding and killing Birdperson.
- Lucy (voiced by Alejandra Gollas) – A maid employed on the Titanic 2, an attraction inspired by the film Titanic. She initially comes across as a nice lady but reveals her true colors when she forces Jerry at gunpoint to draw her nude and have sex with her in a car (both references to scenes from the Titanic film). Before the sex actually takes place, Jerry is rescued by Beth who knocks Lucy unconscious. She later attempts to follow Beth and Jerry home by clinging to the underside of their car (as in Cape Fear), but is knocked off and run over by another vehicle.
- Nathan (voiced by Kurtwood Smith) – A general in the United States Army who does not like the idea that Rick has been tasked with dealing with the Cromulons, preferring instead to launch nuclear missiles at them. He betrays the President and tries to kill him, but is vaporized by Rick before he can.
- Taddy Mason (voiced by Justin Roiland) – A man who runs a hotline service in which lonely people can call him and have conversations, allowing them to pretend to have a friend. Since becoming unemployed, Jerry has been a frequent caller to Mason, having racked up an excessively high phone bill that he attempts to manipulate Summer into helping him pay off.
- The Death Stalkers (voiced by Joel McHale, Tony Hale, Laura Bailey, Ryan Ridley, and John DiMaggio) – A group of violent scavengers that live in an alternate dimension suspiciously similar to that depicted in the Mad Max movies. Rick, Morty and Summer live with them for a short period of time in "Rickmancing the Stone".
- Jaguar (voiced by Danny Trejo) – A criminal who was incarcerated by a foreign government agency. The agency had initially intended to hold him prisoner until his natural death, but released him to assassinate Pickle Rick, offering the release of his daughter. During the fight, he and Pickle Rick realize that they have no reason to be enemies and Jaguar assists Pickle Rick in defeating the agency (who had already killed Jaguar's daughter and lied to him to get him to help them). During the post-credits scene of "Pickle Rick", Jaguar repays Rick by killing Concerto just as the piano-themed villain was about to kill Rick and Morty in his giant piano death trap.
- The Agency Director (voiced by Peter Serafinowicz) – Director of the mysterious agency and its illegal activities, he succeeds in capturing Jaguar but makes the mistake of attempting to assassinate Pickle Rick. While making his treacherous escape via helicopter—which has already been commandeered by Rick and Jaguar, now allied against the agency—the building is engulfed in an explosion and the Director appears to be killed. In The Art of Rick and Morty Vol. 2, the Agency Director's name is revealed to have been Pavel Bartek.
- Dr. Helen Wong (voiced by Susan Sarandon) – A Chinese American family therapist who holds a session with the Smith family after Beth and Jerry's divorce. Intelligent and non-judgmental, she remained calm even in the face of Beth's rude hostility and Rick turning himself into a pickle in an attempt to avoid attending. She suggested that many of the family's problems stemmed from their tendency to "use intelligence to justify sickness", highlighting how Rick seems to regard menial work and empathy as beneath him.
- Thomas "Tommy" Lipkip (voiced by Thomas Middleditch) – A friend of Beth during her sociopathic childhood years. Jealous of his loving relationship with his father Joseph Eli Lipkip, Beth invited him into Froopyland, the alternate dimension Rick created for her and left him for dead there. Later when Joseph was accused of murdering and eating him and faced his upcoming execution, Rick and Beth returned to Froopyland where they found Tommy ruling as king, mating with the local creatures and consuming the resulting offspring to survive. Unable to convince him to return home due to her refusal to apologize for abandoning him, Beth snapped, went on a violent rampage, and ended up returning with just Tommy's severed finger which Rick used to create a clone of Tommy that they sent to replace the original, saving Joseph before he can be subjected to the lethal injection.
- Logic (voiced by himself) – Logic makes a cameo appearance at the end of "Vindicators 3: The Return of Worldender", having been hired by Rick to perform at his party. He sings a rap song about the Vindicators which mostly consists of lyrics about how underappreciated their janitor Noob Noob is. He eventually begins running out of lyrics and asks if he is getting paid.
- Angie Flint (voiced by Pamela Adlon) – A human cyborg and tick-picker who Rick used to get into Heist-Con.
- Professor Shabooboo – The world's leading expert on sperm, as stated by the President. He tracked Morty's giant sperms to the Grand Canyon and also captured one of them, which was killed instantly by Morty with a ray-gun.
- Coop (voiced by Timothy Olyphant) – A US Marine trained to fight as a turkey.
- Marvin (voiced by Jeff Loveness) – A security guard of Self-Referential Six.
- Hugh Jackman (voiced by himself) – Rick encountered him at a bee party at the time when he, Birdperson, Squanchy, Gearhead, and Gene were holding a secret intervention for Mr. Poopybutthole. He agreed to party with them due to his wife being Gene's cousin.
- John (voiced by Chris Parnell) – A news anchor. He would often criticize the actions done by Andre Curtis.
- Shonda (voiced by Debra Wilson) – A news anchor who works with John on a news channel. She would mostly criticize the actions done by Andre Curtis more than John.
- Pope (voiced by Troy Baker) – An unidentified Pope who used Bigfoot to carry out his attacks on different groups.
- James Gunn (voiced by himself) - In this show, James Gunn was behind the "Maximum Velocitree" franchise.
- Zack Snyder (voiced by himself) - He can be seen interacting with James Gunn in the Warner Bros. commissary.
- Keith - A local swimming pool service technician.
- Bob (voiced by Ty Burrell) - A businessman that Jerry goes to work for.
- Carl Nipslip (voiced by Stephen Root) - A businessman that Bob has Jerry broker a deal with.
- The Cat and Mouse Killer (voiced by Andy Serkis) - A serial killer that Jerry and Summer try to get the metal drums from.
- Sergeant Marlowe (voiced by Bill Camp) - A police sergeant who led the siege on the Cat and Mouse Killer's hideout.

=== Humans in President Curtis ===
- The White House Press Corps - A group of reporters who attend President Curtis' press conferences.
  - Stuckey (voiced by Danielle Uhlarik) - A press reporter who is part of the White House press corps.
  - Munson (voiced by Chris Diamantopoulos) - A press reporter who is part of the White House press corps.
  - Steve (voiced by Nick Reczynski) - A press reporter who is part of the White House press corps.
  - Robert (voiced by Nolan North) - A press reporter who is part of the White House press corps.
  - Frank (voiced by Maulik Pancholy) - A press reporter who is part of the White House press corps.
  - Gigi (voiced by Debra Wilson) - A press reporter who is part of the White House press corps.
- Amelia Earhart (voiced by Kristen Schaal) - A pilot who disappeared trying to fly across the world. In this franchise, Franklin D. Roosevelt found her flying around the Bermuda Triangle and enlisted her to fly people to and from the monster prison called the Triangle with her airplane being given a weapons upgrade by Harry S. Truman. After Warden Ken Jeffries is killed, Earhart succeeds him as prison warden.
- Ken Jeffries (voiced by John Michael Higgins) - The prison warden of the Triangle. He is inadvertently killed during a fight with Curtis and succeeded by Amelia Earhart.
- Beverly Mills (voiced by Kelsey Scott) - The ex-wife of President Curtis and former Mayor of Chicago who is becoming the Governor of Illinois. She runs a program that involves rehabilitating monsters.
  - Jessica (voiced by Danielle Uhlarik) - The personal assistant of Beverly Mills.
- Amil Bhattam (voiced by Danny Pudi) - A television host.
- Sarah Hapkins (voiced by Iris Bahr) - A senator and supporter of the Hatters who is the primary sponsor of the proposition to add a hat to Lincoln's head on Mount Rushmore.
- Martin Popple (voiced by Diedrich Bader) - The leader of the Hats Off movement who appears on Amil's show
- French Army - An army of steampunk armor-wearing Napoleon descendants who are sent to reclaim the land that was sold in the Louisiana Purchase.
  - Commandant Duloc (voiced by Iris Bahr) - The leader of the French Army.
- The Party - A group of humans who doubt the work of President Curtis and plan not to help him in his re-election campaign.
  - Party Leader Susan (voiced by Jane Lynch) - One of the leaders of The Party.
  - Party Leader Tony (voiced by Diedrich Bader) - One of the leaders of The Party.
- Agent Bilkin (voiced by Peter Grosz) - An FBI agent who investigates Orfhlaith O'Doyle's heist at Fort Knox.
- Agent Harrison (voiced by Debra Wilson) - An FBI agent who investigates Orfhlaith O'Doyle's heist at Fort Knox.
- Mika and Carolyn Gladyssmer (voiced by Lisa Gilroy and Edi Patterson) - Two stepsisters who are the co-anchors of a news program.
- General Reese (voiced by Nick Kocher) - An army general who accompanied Beverly Mills in going after Paul Bunyan.
- The Bunyan Sympathizers - A group of people who sympathize with the tree-bodied Paul Bunyan and work to plant trees.
- The Hatters - A group of people who support having a hat placed on Abraham Lincoln's head on Mount Rushmore.

=== Aliens/Non-humans in Rick and Morty ===
- The Space Cruiser/Car (voiced by Kari Wahlgren) – The Space Cruiser or simply called the "car" by Rick, is his sentient weaponized spaceship, built out of materials in the Smith family garage. In "Amortycan Grickfitti", she blackmails Morty and Summer into allowing her to take their joyride out on her own joyride, later displaying an ability to take over physical bodies to free them from prison. In "Solaricks", she is revealed to be operated by D.I.A.N.E., an artificial intelligence based on Rick's deceased wife, Diane Sanchez, who also operates the Smith family garage whenever Rick isn't using his ship.
- Butter Robot/Purpose Robot (voiced by the Speak Bot Free A.I., via the open-source engine Flite) – The robot is a small, two armed, mobile, sentient machine created for fulfilling niche purposes, greatly dissatisfied with each one. First created with the sole purpose of passing butter, the Purpose Robot is later assigned the purposes of breaking out of a cell, and releasing Rhett Caan from his cell.
- Snuffles/Snowball (voiced by Rob Paulsen) – Snuffles was the Smith family dog. Fed up with the dog's lack of intelligence, Jerry asks Rick to create a device that would amplify it. This caused Snuffles to realize that dogs are being oppressed and create robot suits for himself and other dogs to take over the world, demanding to be referred to as Snowball because his "fur is pretty and white". Since Morty was kind to him, he keeps Morty as his own pet and pampers him, exhibiting the same kind of "pet parent" behavior that his species rebelled against humanity for. Rick tricks him into thinking that Morty is dying of a fatal kidney disease, so Snuffles spares no expense attempting to cure Morty. After realizing that he and the other dogs became what they hated by enslaving humanity, they become remorseful and travel to a new dimension to live in peace.
- King Jellybean (voiced by Tom Kenny) – A depraved anthropomorphic jellybean who rules a poor village. He attempts to rape Morty in a public bathroom, but Morty fights back and beats him up. He is killed by Rick, and is posthumously revealed to have a collection of compromising photographs, which are strongly implied to be of him molesting children. The photographs are destroyed to preserve what he represented to the people.
- Mr. Lucius Needful (voiced by Alfred Molina) – A mysterious man who owns an antique store. The items he sells are all cursed and subject the buyer to an ironic punishment. He is quickly revealed by Rick to be the Devil, a fact he doesn't bother to conceal afterward. Mr. Lucius Needful is a parody of Leland Gaunt from Stephen King's novel, Needful Things and Mr. Dark from Something Wicked This Way Comes by Ray Bradbury. Rick starts a rival business uncursing his merchandise, which hurts his business and causes him to attempt suicide. Summer helps him retool his shop into an online store and then he double-crosses her. Rick and Summer then take steroids in order to bulk up, then beat him up as revenge for him "Zuckerberging" Summer.
- Fart (voiced by Jemaine Clement) – A gaseous being with the ability to read minds and alter matter. His species has no need for names, but he calls himself "Fart" after Rick refers to him as one. At Morty's insistence, he and Rick assist Fart in getting back home, but Fart is killed by Morty after it is revealed that his species sees carbon-based lifeforms as a disease and plans to wipe them out. His musical style is inspired by the personality and works of David Bowie.
- Beta VII (voiced by Patton Oswalt) – Another hive mind who resembles the Borg from Star Trek: The Next Generation. He is an associate of Unity who appears to harbor a crush on her. He is a reference to the stereotype of the "beta male" and the implication is that he has been "friend zoned" by Unity.
- Zeep Xanflorp (voiced by Stephen Colbert) – A scientist within Rick's Microverse Battery who creates his own micro-planet power supply called the Miniverse. His development of a new power supply prevents Rick from using his flying car, leading to a feud between the two. Zeep is depicted as arrogant and very intelligent, and in many ways a parallel of Rick.
- Glaxo Slimslom (voiced by Jim Rash) – A therapist at the galaxy's most successful couples counselling institute on Nuptia 4, which specialized in materializing romantic partners' perceptions of each other in the form of living biological "mythologizations". When Rick sends Jerry and Beth to the institute, however, their demonized mythologizations of each other escape and go on a murderous rampage. Glexo angrily declared that their marriage was the worst he had ever seen and should not exist, before escaping with other therapists.
- Shrimply Pibbles – An intergalactic civil rights leader described as "the most important man in the universe". He is supposed to receive Jerry's penis in a heart transplant after it is found that his penis can be fashioned into a new heart, but Jerry attempts to weasel out of it. Pibbles receives a state-of-the-art artificial heart instead. Although other aliens present arguments on his behalf, Shrimply Pibbles himself does not speak during this adventure. For instance, an alien in a wheelchair (voiced by Werner Herzog) offers a unique viewpoint regarding Jerry's reservations.
- Cornvelius Daniel (voiced by Nathan Fillion) – A Galactic Federation agent who attempts to get the mathematical formulation for interdimensional travel out of Rick's brain while Rick is in federation penal custody. Daniel's mind is briefly swapped into Rick's body, just before Seal Team Rick arrive to assassinate Rick.
- Worldender – A supervillain and the archenemy of the Vindicators. He had attempted to destroy the world once before, but was thwarted by the Vindicators. The Vindicators reassemble to stop him a second time. By the time they arrive at his lair, they find that he and his men had already been brutally murdered by Rick whilst on a drunken bender. He is a parody of various comic book supervillains such as Thanos and Darkseid, and possibly Apocalypse.
- Doom-nomitron – An unseen supervillain who was the focus of the fateful and penultimate Vindicators 2 mission. His exact intent is unknown, but he was most likely going to destroy the world and possibly the universe, just like Worldender. The Vindicators, who previously invited Rick and Morty to join them, decided "at Alan Rails' insistence" not to in their second adventure. As a result, three of the heroes died and the Vindicators resorted to the extreme measure of destroying the planet Dorian 5 along with its population to take the villain with it. The specific reason why they destroyed the planet is that Doomnometron was a shapeshifter who was also possibly indestructible, save for a planetary core implosion or an event of similar magnitude. The Vindicators' reason was considered sound, save for Rick saying he could have easily whipped up a device to detect Doomnometron from orbit with a snap of his fingers.
- Tony (voiced by Jeffrey Wright) – A kindhearted yet depressed alien who caught the attention of Rick by using a toilet that Rick uses on another planet.
- Miles Knightley (voiced by Justin Theroux) – A master criminal who is the organizer of HeistCon.
- Glar (voiced by Justin Roiland) – A large alien pianist who Rick used to get into Heist-Con.
- Truckula – A vampire monster truck racer who Rick used to get into Heist-Con.
- Hephaestus (voiced by Maurice LaMarche) – The blacksmith of the Greek gods. He agrees to help Rick with a heist.
- Ventriloquiver (voiced by Claudia Black) – A sentient archery-themed ventriloquist doll that agrees to help Rick with his heist.
- Elon Tusk (voiced by Elon Musk) – The CEO of Tuskla who resembles his voice actor, but has tusks due to the fact that he comes from the Tusk Dimension where the humans there have tusks.
- Talking Cat (voiced by Matthew Broderick) – An unnamed talking cat that Jerry encounters. He is ashamed of the reason he can talk and tries to keep it secret. When Rick and Jerry read his memories, they are both horrified by what they see and drive the cat away. Rick wipes the memories of it from Jerry's mind.
- Balthromaw (voiced by Liam Cunningham) – A dragon that Rick gets for Morty, but accidentally soul bonds with him.
- Story Lord (voiced by Paul Giamatti) – The owner of the Story Train.
- Jesus Christ (voiced by Christopher Meloni) – A fictional personification of Jesus Christ of Nazareth, created when Rick and Morty invoked repentance to create a literal deus ex machina.
- Gaia (voiced by Kari Wahlgren) – A sentient planet that Rick had a romance with.
- Reggie (voiced by Dan Harmon) – A god-like being who has Gaia as a love interest.
- Voiceovarians (voiced by Justin Roiland and Spencer Grammer) – Creatures residing in the ear which can give illusions of voiceovers. Morty and Summer became unwitting hosts to two of them, and thus served as narrators as the Smith family was caught up in Rick's Gotron obsession.
- Mr. Frundles (voiced by Justin Roiland) – An alien parasite based on gray goo. Takes over and forces Rick and his family to leave Dimension C-131 and move to the Parmesan Dimension.
- Shnoopy Bloopers (voiced by Tom Kenny) – A bipedal humanoid with eyes on stalks and a pig snout on top of the head. He stabs Rick in the chest at the bar with the invincibility shield before the latter retaliates with by stabbing him in the neck with a broken glass bottle. When they recovered from their injuries, it is revealed they are friends and Shnoopy Bloopers treats Rick to food and drink at the resort.
- Risotto Groupon (voiced by Clancy Brown) – A large alien assistant general manager of the invincibility restaurant in 305 with the Whirly Dirly. He also experiences the wormhole with the compromised temporal shield with Rick and Jerry.
- Franklin D. Roosevelt – A former US president who transformed into a giant spider-like monster after being a test subject for the polio vaccine. He was kept under the Pentagon, consuming unchosen Thanksgiving turkeys until he was incinerated by Morty.
- Chans (voiced by Peter Dinklage) – The leader of a group of alien terrorists.
- Technologically-Advanced Dinosaurs – The descendants of the dinosaurs that mastered technology and left Earth during the Cretaceous–Paleogene extinction event. Their attempts to colonize other planets resulted in the creation of sentient asteroids that targeted them.
  - Tyrannosaurus (voiced by Lisa Kudrow) – One of the unnamed leaders of the technologically advanced dinosaurs.
  - Brachiosaurus (voiced by Jason Mraz) – One of the unnamed leaders of the technologically advanced dinosaurs.
  - Triceratops (voiced by Dan Harmon) – One of the unnamed leaders of the technologically advanced dinosaurs.
- Previous Leon (voiced by Justin Roiland) – Previous Leon is a creature that injects venom into his prey that causes them to go into a "previously on" spiral with his name being a pun of it. His venom makes his victim think more and more of their life is behind them and feeds on their released potential before eventually killing them.
- Gul'Karna (vocal effects provided by Tom Kenny) – Gul'Karna of the Clan of the Skin-Thieves is a Predator private investigator that Mr. Poopybutthole enlisted to keep an eye on Amy until she remarried to him.
- Bigfoot (voiced by Maurice LaMarche) – An ape-like cryptid. Unlike the Alien Parasite version, this version has tangled with Rick many times.
- Count Dracula – A vampire who was among the monsters trapped by the Pope.
- Frankenstein's Monster – A simulacrum of body parts. Unlike the Alien Parasite version, this version was among the monsters trapped by the Pope and resembled the book version.
- Wolfman – A werewolf who was among the monsters trapped by the Pope.
- Mummy – A mummy who was among the monsters trapped by the Pope.
- Gill-man – A piscine humanoid who was among the monsters trapped by the Pope.
- The Fear Hole Promoter (voiced by Liev Schreiber) – An unnamed human-shaped being who promotes the Fear Hole that is located in a stall at a Denny's restaurant.
- The Collective (voiced by Tilda Swinton) - A square-headed being with four faces on each side who is a Multiverse Assimilator. It tried to assimilate the known Multiverses. Rick, Morty, and Evil Morty fought the Collective which ended with the Collective turned into a hard drive.
- The Tree Warden (voiced by John Hodgman) - A sentient tree on an unknown planet. Anyone who tries to harvest its sap will end up dragged underground and reduced to single cell organisms in the planet's hollow area where they end up going through evolution. Anyone who does starts the process over again.

=== Aliens/Non-humans in President Curtis ===
- Paul Bunyan (voiced by Jamieson Price) - A giant of American folklore. Bunyan was a longtime criminal and murderer until he was decapitated and killed by Curtis. Following his death, Bunyan's head landed in the woods and was attached to a wooden body by the nearby trees, resurrecting him.
- Doppelgobble - A doppelgänger who infiltrates a press conference posing as a reporter named Steve. When the real Steve shows up stating that he was ambushed, the Doppelgobble goes on the attack and is killed by O'Doyle.
- Triangle Inmates - The inmates of a Bermuda Triangle prison called the Triangle. Its prison warden Ken Jeffries was using the inmates as part of a plot to re-enact the features of Monsters, Inc.. When the plan was foiled and Jeffries was killed, Amelia Earhart was sworn in as the new prison warden.
  - Apesquatch - A Bigfoot-like creature and an inmate of the Triangle who was referenced to have been found dead outside the Triangle.
  - Carnivorous plant - A new arrival to the Triangle during O'Doyle's infiltration whose appearance is similar to Audrey II from Little Shop of Horrors and its film adaption.
  - Chupacabra - A new arrival to the Triangle during O'Doyle's infiltration.
  - Count Dracula (voiced by Carlos Alazraqui) - A new arrival to the Triangle during O'Doyle's infiltration. Unlike the version that was held captive by the Pope, this version resembles the Gary Oldman version from Bram Stoker's Dracula down to the white wig and red outfit.
  - Dover Demon - A new arrival to the Triangle during O'Doyle's infiltration.
  - Evil Haunted Car (voiced by Alanna Ubach) - A possessed car and inmate of the Triangle.
  - Faun - A new arrival to the Triangle during O'Doyle's infiltration who is modeled after the Faun from Pan's Labyrinth.
  - Flatwoods monster - A new arrival to the Triangle during O'Doyle's infiltration.
  - Fly - An imate of the Triangle when Orfhlaith O'Doyle was remanded there.
  - Flyguy - An insectoid inmate of the Triangle who was referenced to have been found dead outside the Triangle.
  - Fresno nightcrawler - A new arrival to the Triangle during O'Doyle's infiltration.
  - Goatman - A new arrival to the Triangle during O'Doyle's infiltration.
  - Griffin - An unnamed griffin inmate of the Triangle who was referenced to have been found dead outside the Triangle.
  - Hat Man - An inmate of the Triangle when Orfhlaith O'Doyle was remanded there.
  - Kappa - A new arrival to the Triangle during O'Doyle's infiltration.
  - Krampus - An inmate of the Triangle when Orfhlaith O'Doyle was remanded there.
  - Loch Ness Monster - An inmate of the Triangle. Its corpse washed ashore, which caused President Curtis to investigate the Triangle.
  - Onryō - A vengeful ghost similar to Sadako Yamamura who is a new arrival to the Triangle during O'Doyle's infiltration.
  - Orc (voiced by Piotr Michael) - An orc inmate of the Triangle. His brain was removed from his body by O'Doyle.
  - Ogre (voiced by Piotr Michael) - An ogre inmate of the Triangle.
  - Quadra - A goatman inmate of the Triangle who was referenced to have been found dead outside the Triangle.
  - Slender Man (voiced by Nick Reczynski) - A new arrival to the Triangle during O'Doyle's infiltration.
  - Soul Ganderer (voiced by Maria Bamford) - A young girl who can turn into a large monster with multiple faces.
  - Swamptopus (voiced by Fred Tatasciore) - A swamp monster inmate of the Triangle who evokes the traits of Cthulhu and Man-Thing. He befriends O'Doyle when he is sent undercover in the Triangle.
  - Wendigo - A new arrival to the Triangle during O'Doyle's infiltration.
- Candyman (voiced by Imari Williams) - A hook-wielding spirit who was rehabilitated by Beverly Mills.
- The Babadook - A mysterious humanoid monster who was one of Beverly Mills' monster rehabilitation success stories.
- Werewolves Anonymous - A syndicate of werewolves who oppose Beverly Mills' monster rehabilitation program.
  - Werewolves Anonymous Leader (voiced by Echo Kellum) - The unnamed leader of Werewolves Anonymous. During the raid on their headquarters, the lead werewolf was defeated by Candyman and arrested by the police.
  - Werewolf Server (voiced by Carlos Alazraqui) - A werewolf who infiltrated Beverly Mills' banquet as a server. He was defeated by President Curtis.
- West Wing World Robots (voiced by Echo Kellum and Danielle Uhlarik) - A group of robots who reside at West Wing World and test the White House staff there.
  - West Wing World President (voiced by Nick Reczynski) - A robotic President.
  - Frank (voiced Nick Reczynski) - A robot residing in West Wing World.
  - Mary (voiced by Grey DeLisle) - A robot residing in West Wing World.
  - Tom (voiced by Carlos Alazraqui) - A robot residing in West Wing World.
- Gun Baby - A robot who O'Doyle adopted from West Wing World.
- Louisiana Vampire Sect - A sect of vampires that reside in Louisiana since Thomas Jefferson bought the Louisiana Purchase. However, Jefferson ended up "Mark Zuckerberging" them where they are unable to leave Louisiana. Most of them were killed by President Curtis' group while the others fled when the Sun came up.
  - Salem Montgomery (voiced by Billy Zane) - The leader of the Louisiana Vampire Sect.
  - Elsie (voiced by Gillian Jacobs) - A member of the Louisiana Vampire Sect.
  - Tony (voiced by Diedrich Bader) - A member of the Louisiana Vampire Sect.
- David the Water Witch (voiced by Cree Summer) - A water witch who resides at Camp David. Each President must undergo a trial within the swamp that her spirit is confined to in order to prove that they are a leader.
- Hollow Earth inhabitants - An assortment of creatures that live in Hollow Earth.
  - Daaboo - A race of humanoids that live in the first layer of Hollow Earth.
    - Koochoo (voiced by Thomas Lennon) - The elder of the Daaboo.
    - Toomoo (voiced by Stephen Root) - A Daaboo who had a relationship with Janice.
  - Moss People - A race of humanoid moss creatures that live in the second layer of Hollow Earth.
  - Mushroom People - A race of humanoid mushroom creatures that live in the third layer of Hollow Earth.
    - Mushroom Queen (voiced by Danielle Uhlarik) - The Queen of the Mushroom People.
  - Nickel People - A race of humanoid nickel creatures that live in the fourth layer of Hollow Earth.
    - Nickel King (voiced by Andy St. Clair) - The king of the Nickel People.
- Ghost of Abraham Lincoln (voiced by David Herman) - The ghost of the 16th President of the United States who was trapped in the Lincoln Bedroom due to unfinished businesses.
- Clone of John Wilkes Booth (voiced by Eric Bauza) - A clone of Abraham Lincoln's murderer who was created by Dr. Finch to serve as one of Lincoln's unfinished businesses.
- Orfhlaith O'Doyle (voiced by Grey DeLisle) - A leprechaun and the mother of Francis O'Doyle who was caught robbing Fort Knox. Francis and Rho Banks discover that she was killing the matriach of the leprechaun clans in order to reunite all of them into one clan. Rho disguises herself as Francis to fool Orfhlaith into unknowingly confessing to her.
- Cahill Clan - A clan of leprechauns who were among the leprechaun clans united under O'Doyle.
  - Declan Cahill (voiced by Piotr Michael) - A member of the Cahill Clan.
  - Donny Cahill (voiced by Brendan Jennings) - A member of the Cahill Clan.
  - Meglochaun (vocal effects provided by Casey Campbell) - The Meglochauns are leprechauns who were bred to be big and tough.
- Humbuglar (voiced by Alex Brightman) - An insect-like villain who was causing havoc during the Christmas season. He fought President Curtis, O'Doyle, Banks, and Dr. Finch before falling through the glass roof of the mall to his death.
- Synths - A group of synthetic super soldiers who were reprogrammed by Dr. Finch to spread Christmas spirit.
  - Chad (voiced by Nick Kocher) - A member of the Synths.
  - Cindy (voiced by Suzy Nakamura) - A member of the Synths.
  - Giselle (voiced by Mary Grill) - A member of the Synths.
  - Greyson (voiced by Tommy Dewey) - A member of the Synths.
  - Steve (voiced by Maulik Pancholy) - A member of the Synths.
- Santa Claus (voiced by Jim O'Heir) - A legendary figure associated with the Christmas season. Santa Claus also runs Hallmark under the alias of Ed Carol and is shown to have cryokinetic abilities.
  - Reindeemons - A group of reindeer-like demons based on Santa's reindeer.
    - Rudolph - A reindeemon with a lightbulb nose and metallic jaws.
    - Donner - A reindeemon.
    - Blitzen - A reindeemon.
