= Rick and Morty season 6 =

Rick and Morty
- Season 6
- Blu-ray cover
- Showrunner: Scott Marder
- Starring: Justin Roiland; Chris Parnell; Spencer Grammer; Sarah Chalke
- No. of episodes: 10

Release
- Original network: Adult Swim
- Original release: September 4 – December 11, 2022

Season chronology
- ← Previous; Season 5 Next → Season 7

The sixth season of the American adult animated television series Rick and Morty premiered on September 4, 2022. Starring Justin Roiland as both titular characters, Rick Sanchez and Morty Smith, and their inter-dimensional counterparts, the season was ordered before the fourth season of the show finished airing, in May 2020. It is the final season to feature Roiland providing any voice as he was fired from the series on January 24, 2023, due to domestic violence allegations.

== Cast and characters ==
=== Main ===
- Justin Roiland as Rick Sanchez C-137 and Morty Smith Prime, the main characters of the series.
- Chris Parnell as Jerry Smith 5126, Morty's and Summer's father, Beth's husband, and Rick's son-in-law.
- Spencer Grammer as Summer Smith C-131, Morty's older sister and Rick's granddaughter.
- Sarah Chalke as Beth Smith C-131, Morty's and Summer's mother and Rick's daughter.

=== Recurring ===
- Keith David as President Andre Curtis, the President of the United States and erstwhile frenemy of Rick.
- Paul Giamatti as Story Lord, the former conductor of the Story Train, written out of the fourth wall into a real dimension.

=== Guest ===
- Kari Wahlgren as D.I.A.N.E., an AI made by Rick to impersonate his long deceased wife, Diane.
- Peter Dinklage as Chans, the leader of a group of alien terrorists, based on Hans Gruber from the 1988 action film Die Hard.
- Heather Anne Campbell as Jennith Padrow-Chunt, the CEO of a fortune cookie factory and a parody of Gwyneth Paltrow.
- James Adomian as Old M. Hucksbee, the caretaker of the Lockerean.
- Patricia Lentz as Joyce Smith, Jerry's mother.
- Lisa Kudrow as a technologically advanced Tyrannosaurus who returns to Earth.
- Jason Mraz as a technologically advanced Brachiosaurus who returns to Earth.
- Dan Harmon as:
  - A technologically advanced Triceratops who returns to Earth.
  - Mr. Nimbus, an aquatic character who can control marine life and the police.
- Christopher Meloni as Jesus Christ, a fictional personified version of Jesus Christ brought into reality.
- Jeff Loveness as Jan, Story Lord's creator and a parody of series creator Dan Harmon.
- Susan Sarandon as Dr. Wong, the Smith family's therapist.
- Diedrich Bader as Blagnar the Eternal, the head of a council of intergalactic superheroes.
- Will Forte as Eugene Michael Piss / Pissmaster, an alien with a flying suit that enables him to shoot urine against an opponent.
- John Early as Cookie Magneto, a parody of Magneto who controls cookies.
- Jack Black as a Viscount of Venus.
- Daniel Radcliffe, Matt King, David Mitchell, and Robert Webb as the Knights of the Sun.

== Episodes ==
No. overall	No. in season	Title	Directed by	Written by	Original release date	U.S. viewers (millions)
52	1	"Solaricks"	Jacob Hair	Albro Lundy	September 4, 2022	0.66
Saved from the Citadel ruins by Space Beth, Rick attempts to reset the settings on his portal gun, but accidentally sends everyone who has traveled interdimensionally to their original dimensions. Morty returns to Cronenberg World from "Rick Potion#9", Jerry swaps places with "Season Two Jerry" because of the events of "Mortynight Run", and Rick is transported to his original universe where his wife Diane and his Beth were killed by Rick Prime, who is Morty's true grandfather. As Summer and both Beths travel back to the Citadel to establish an interdimensional beacon, Rick learns that Rick Prime was also transported by the reset. The original Jerry tells Morty that his Beth and Summer did not survive being frozen in "The Rickshank Rickdemption". (Note: As depicted in the comic "Look Who's Cronenberging Now" (2018).) Jerry abandons Morty in order to move on. Rick rescues Morty and takes him to confront Rick Prime but finds an elaborate trap. Morty convinces him to save the rest of the family instead. However, once the family picks up Jerry and returns home, they are confronted by Season Two Jerry, who releases an alien named Mr. Frundles that rapidly replicates and forces the family to relocate to a replacement dimension where their counterparts all died. Post-credits scene: Rick Prime lands back on Cronenberg World, where he kills Jerry Prime after rejecting an offer to team up to hunt down Rick and Morty.
53	2	"Rick: A Mort Well Lived"	Kyounghee Lim	Alex Rubens	September 11, 2022	0.60
Die Hard-inspired alien terrorists attack the Blips and Chitz arcade and cause a temporary power outage. As a result, Morty becomes trapped in the virtual reality game Roy, with his identity split among the game's five billion NPCs. Rick enters the game, playing as the titular Roy, to try to convince the NPCs that they are part of Morty. Rick builds millions of spaceships, planning on taking all the fragments to the edge of the map, which will reset the game and allow Rick and Morty to exit. However, Rick faces resistance from many Morty fragments, some of whom go to war with each other. One individualistic fragment, Marta, negotiates with Rick—she convinces the other Morty fragments to leave on one unspoken condition. Meanwhile, Summer picks off the terrorists, led by Chans, one by one. Chans explains that all sapient species develop the Die Hard mythology and that he is an expert who has written several books about it. Summer reads one of Chans' books, then defeats him with a gun taped to her back just as Rick and Morty escape Roy. Rick pays a Blips and Chitz staffer to take the still-running Roy machine into storage, with Marta and 8% of the NPCs left behind inside. Post-credits scene: An alien stands outside a snow base wearing a sandwich board that says "I HATE EVERYBODY". Two other aliens watch from afar and debate whether the sign's message is too broad to provoke anyone.
54	3	"Bethic Twinstinct"	Douglas Einar Olsen	Anne Lane	September 18, 2022	0.55
Space Beth comes back to celebrate Thanksgiving. She and Beth bond over a bottle of Venusian Wine which Space Beth had brought back from Venus. Eventually, their casual flirting develops into a full-on love affair. Summer and Morty notice, but try to ignore it by playing "realistic" alien video games. Rick deduces the affair after he and his grandkids catch them pulling a "San Junipero" in his holodeck. Rick tells Beth that while he once did something similar, she must be careful about what this could do to the family. Summer and Morty become concerned about Jerry, who previously claimed he would kill himself if Beth cheated on him. When Space Beth admits to the affair to Jerry, he rolls up into a pillbug (an emotional defense system Rick built for him while they were drunk together). Both Beths ask Rick to erase their memories of the affair. Jerry overhears this and exits his pill bug form to stop the erasure, but says he is leaving Beth. Space Beth realizes that Jerry is only upset that the affair happened without his knowledge. With Jerry's full consent, he and the Beths have a threesome, to Summer's and Morty's disgust. After Space Beth leaves, Rick locks the Venusian Wine in an invisible cabinet and destroys its key-remote. Post-credits scene: Out of curiosity, Jerry visits the Jerryboree alone to seek an affair with another Jerry, but is stopped by the receptionist who says that they have had issues with that very thing. Outside, Jerry runs into another Jerry. They share a quick kiss and part ways.
55	4	"Night Family"	Jacob Hair	Rob Schrab	September 25, 2022	0.60
Rick obtains an alien device called a "somnambulator" that allows him to voluntarily sleepwalk, creating a "Night Person" who does tasks that he does not want to do in the daytime. The rest of the family create their own "night people" who exercise, learn new skills, and do household chores. Eventually, Night Summer leaves a note requesting that Rick rinse the dishes before she washes them, but Rick deliberately ignores the request. The escalating conflict between the Smiths and their "night family" over the dishes ends with Night Summer and her minions locking Rick out of his own technology, building a giant version of the somnambulator to maintain permanent control of their bodies, and enslaving their diurnal selves while the Night Family sleeps. The Smiths attempt to escape with the help of Night Jerry, whom Jerry had befriended by leaving handwritten notes for him, and a chaotic battle ensues as both sides fight for control by tranquilizing and waking each other. Night Summer offers a truce in exchange for Rick washing his dishes. Rick refuses and as a result, Summer allows his Night Person to retake control of his body. Post-credits scene: After months of living exorbitantly, the Night Family is left destitute. Rather than face the consequences, Night Rick simply destroys the somnambulator, returning Rick and the family to normal. However, they freak out when they learn the Choco Taco has been discontinued.
56	5	"Final DeSmithation"	Douglas Einar Olsen	Heather Anne Campbell	October 2, 2022	0.58
Jerry receives a fortune cookie that says he is destined to have sex with his mother. Upon noticing how circumstances seem to be moving inexorably toward said fortune, he and Rick infiltrate the fortune cookie factory to investigate while Morty, Summer, and both Beths visit the zoo. There, the two find that fortune cookies come from the excrement of a captive fate-altering alien called a Lockerean, and Jerry's fortune came from its imprisoned caretaker in an attempt to draw scrutiny. CEO Jennith Padrow-Chunt brings in a squad of armed fortune-boosted guards, alongside Jerry's mother to ensure he follows through with his fate, until Rick feeds Jerry another fortune cookie that cancels it out at the last minute. Because people are immortal until their fortunes are fulfilled, Rick finds a way to make Padrow-Chunt the world's most successful businesswoman (her fate), thus rendering her vulnerable, and she and the caretaker are subsequently eaten by the Lockerean. After they return home, it is revealed that Rick survived by eating a fortune that said "You'll make a new friend", which Jerry accidentally fulfills by thanking him and calling him a friend, much to Rick's chagrin. Post-credits scene: Morty, Summer and the Beths visit the zoo. At the gift shop, Morty sees an advertisement aimed at zebras, showing zoo patrons eating food intended for zebras, vomiting, and causing a murderous riot. He questions why they continue to display that video, before deducing they must be in a human zoo.
57	6	"Juricksic Mort"	Kyounghee Lim	Nick Rutherford	October 9, 2022	0.54
A technologically advanced species of dinosaurs arrive on Earth, stating that it is their former home and they travel between worlds to spread peace and technology. The world's governments grant them control and they soon make work obsolete and create a utopia. Many people, however, are dissatisfied with the lack of responsibility, including the President, who promises to let Rick host the Academy Awards if he can get rid of the dinosaurs. Rick and Morty visit other planets that the dinosaurs have tended, finding that they all suffered asteroid impacts similar to the one that caused the Chicxulub crater. Rick announces that dinosaurs have a rival species of homicidal sentient asteroids, one of which is headed for Earth. Reluctant to use violence even in self-defense, the dinosaurs leave to draw the impactor away. Rick hosts the Oscars, but leaves when Summer tells him the dinosaurs are on Mars awaiting their demise. He travels to Mars and tells the dinosaurs that selflessness and selfishness are the same, prompting them to destroy the asteroid. In thanks for Rick "saving" them, the dinosaurs fix the multiversal rift, much to his dismay. Rick returns home and repairs his portal gun, excitedly telling Morty their interdimensional adventures can resume. Post-credits scene: The dinosaurs settle on an uninhabited planet and spend their time doing skateboarding tricks.
58	7	"Full Meta Jackrick"	Lucas Gray	Alex Rubens	November 20, 2022	0.51
After venturing beyond the fourth wall into the meta where all fictional characters exist, Rick and Morty fall into a trap set by Story Lord from "Never Ricking Morty". Story Lord steals Rick's device which allows him to travel to the real world and seek out his creator, Jan. Meanwhile, Rick and Morty, seeking a way back to the real world, infiltrate the fortress of the "Self-Referential Six", a group of "meta nerds" who all have reality-warping powers based on narrative techniques and devices (such as plot twists and continuity errors), but are attacked by the group and forced to flee back into the meta. They are rescued by Joseph Campbell, who assists them in creating a device to return to the real world to confront Story Lord. Jan and Story Lord have created a machine capable of siphoning motivation from the universe's inhabitants to fuel Story Lord's own "motivation." Morty, with the assistance of a spectral Campbell, convinces Jan to stop operating the machine, depowering Story Lord and allowing Rick to defeat him. At Morty's and Campbell's prompting, Jan kills Story Lord. After Rick and Morty depart, he becomes inspired to continue writing, much to the spectral Campbell's dismay. Post-credits scene: An enormous, cheerful creature named "Tag-Man" fights multiple enemies in an arena while yelling about himself.
59	8	"Analyze Piss"	Fill Marc Sagadraca	James Siciliano	November 27, 2022	0.53
Tired of attacks from supervillains, Rick goes to Dr. Wong from "Pickle Rick" for advice. She recommends that he ignore them. A villain named Pissmaster goads Rick into battling him, which Jerry does in his place when Pissmaster makes a sexual remark about Summer. The incident goes viral and Jerry is invited to sit on a council of intergalactic superheroes, much to Rick's relief as he's now free of burden. Rick learns how bad Jerry humiliated Pissmaster and he visits him to discover that Pissmaster committed suicide, having left a note blaming Jerry. Rick dons Pissmaster's suit and performs many heroic deeds, redeeming the villain's public image. The council sends Jerry to offer Pissmaster a seat among them, which Jerry reluctantly and forcefully attempts to do as Rick disarms a bomb by sacrificing Pissmaster's suit to cover his suicide with a heroic death. The council dismisses Jerry for his arrogance. Rick lies that he was Pissmaster all along to make Jerry feel better about himself, but secretly gives Morty the real Pissmaster's suicide note. Horrified, Morty promptly tells the rest of the family, who berate Rick for his actions and shame Jerry for Pissmaster's death. Post-credits scene: The council discusses whether to induct Mr. Nimbus from "Mort Dinner Rick Andre".
60	9	"A Rick in King Mortur's Mort"	Jacob Hair	Anne Lane	December 4, 2022	0.53
While waiting in line for food, a Knight of the Sun offers Morty his knighthood. Ignoring Rick's warnings and calling him "boring," Morty goes to the Sun and is told that he must sever his penis to join the Knights. Morty refuses and attempts to leave; opposed by the King of the Sun, he bests the King in combat and becomes King himself. He exposes the Knights' worldview as flawed and convinces them to disband. Without the Knights' influence, a peace summit among the leaders of the planets fails and a solar system war breaks out. Morty finds the Knights of the Sun using heroin and inspires them to resume their duties by promising he will cut off his penis, Rick having built him some fakes. The war ends and all the planets accept Morty as King but have set up various machines to expose his fake penis, forcing Rick and Morty to fake their deaths. With this, the Knights end their tradition of emasculation. Post-credits scene: The hot dog vendor Rick bought food from at the start of the episode is arrested for illegal hot dog trafficking and the hot dogs are released into the wild. The alien detective is then abducted by a flying creature.
61	10	"Ricktional Mortpoon's Rickmas Mortcation"	Kyounghee Lim	Scott Marder	December 11, 2022	0.49
For Christmas, Rick gives Morty a working Star Wars lightsaber, which he accidentally drops perfectly vertically. This causes it to tunnel into the Earth, threatening to destroy the planet if it reaches the Earth's core. Morty learns that Rick replaced himself with a robot after Morty had called him "boring" in "A Rick in King Mortur's Mort", while the real Rick is busy with his search for Rick Prime. During their quest, Morty is aided by President Curtis who then steals the lightsaber. Curtis accidentally drops the lightsaber in the same manner, forcing Morty and Rickbot to retrieve it. In the ensuing confrontation with President Curtis at the White House (which he launched into outer space to escape the possible destruction), Rickbot is mortally injured and the three are sucked into space, but Rick rescues them with a portal. Rickbot succumbs to his injuries and tells him he was only doing what Rick would have done in his place. As Curtis takes his leave, Morty joins Rick in his underground lab, offering to help him locate Rick Prime, prompting Rick to monologue about their impending arduous efforts to track Rick Prime during the upcoming season 7. Post-credits scene: Mr. Poopybutthole, having turned to bodybuilding to get over his ex-wife Amy, breaks his leg attempting a heavy squat. He asks his trainer Karl to telephone Amy using Karl's phone, since Amy blocked his number.

== Production ==
=== Development ===
The season is a part of a long-term deal between show creators Justin Roiland and Dan Harmon and Adult Swim, confirming 70 new episodes would be released over an unspecified amount of seasons. Ten of those episodes were aired as season four, and ten more were aired as season five, leaving fifty episodes remaining. In February 2020, Roiland announced that the sixth season of Rick and Morty was underway.

=== Casting ===
Along with the season's announcement, regulars Justin Roiland, Chris Parnell, Spencer Grammer, and Sarah Chalke were confirmed to return as the Smith family. The second episode of the season, "Rick: A Mort Well Lived", featured Peter Dinklage as a guest star.

=== Writing ===
Writing for the series continued over Zoom during the COVID-19 pandemic, and Dan Harmon said that production was "pretty far along" by November 2020. In March 2021, Harmon confirmed that they were "very late" in the writing process.

=== Roiland's dismissal ===
On January 24, 2023, amid felony charges against Justin Roiland, it was announced that Adult Swim had cut ties with Roiland and that he was fired from the show. This makes the final season where Roiland does any work on the show, including voicing both Rick and Morty.

== Release ==
The season premiered on September 4, 2022 on Adult Swim. It was released on March 28, 2023 in DVD and standard Blu-ray formats, as well as a SteelBook Blu-ray form.

== Reception ==
On the review aggregator Rotten Tomatoes, season 6 has a 91% score based on 62 reviews, with an average rating of 7.50/10. The site's critic consensus reads, "Bookended by some memorable serialized developments, Rick and Morty's sixth season has a lot of fun in between as it explores whether the universe's most toxic genius can actually grow as a person." On Metacritic, the season has a score of 86 out of 100, based on four reviews, indicating "universal acclaim". The season was nominated at the Artios Awards for Outstanding Achievement in Casting – Animated Series.
