= The Vindicators =

American animated superhero comedy franchise

- Created by: Sarah Carbiener; Erica Rosbe
- Original work: "Vindicators 3: The Return of Worldender" (Rick and Morty S. 3)
- Owners: Cartoon Network (Warner Bros. Entertainment)
- Years: 2017 – present
- Based on: Rick and Morty by Justin Roiland, Dan Harmon

Print publications
- Comics: Hero Mix Vol. 1 (2018); Origin of the Vindicators (2018); Crisis on C-137 (2022–2023); The End (2025–2026)

Films and television
- Animated series: "Vindicators 3: The Return of Worldender" (episode; 2017); Vindicators 2: Last Stand Between Earth and Doom (miniseries; 2022)

Games
- Video game(s): Pocket Mortys Season 3 (2017)

Official website
- The Vindicators

The Vindicators is an American animated superhero comedy spin-off of the Rick and Morty franchise, owned by Warner Bros. Discovery, whose primary eponymous team consists of Vance Maximus, Supernova, Alan Rails, Crocubot, Million Ants, and Noob Noob, and were created by Sarah Carbiener and Erica Rosbe for the 2017 third season of Rick and Morty, premiering in "Vindicators 3: The Return of Worldender". Following the publication of a comic book sequel and prequel by Oni Press in 2018, the characters were revived after five years with Vindicators 2: Last Stand Between Earth and Doom, a ten-episode miniseries released to the Adult Swim YouTube channel in 2022 as the second television series in the franchise, with Carbiener serving as showrunner, and expressing interest in further seasons of the series being produced.

The series centers on the misadventures of the Vindicators, a team of galaxy-faring superheroes who protect planets from threats across the universe, with the characters traveling to other planets and dimensions via spaceships while slowly becoming disillusioned with the universe and their place in it, in a dark satire of the superhero genre. The Vindicators series has received critical praise.

== Background ==
=== Creation ===
In 1996, Matt Selman wrote a The Vindicators television pilot script for Comedy Central, revolving around "a team of super heroes with real-life problems". In 1998, the network agreed to produce a pilot from Selman's script, which on completion, was immediately shelved from release due to poor quality, never to be aired.

On the beginning of development of a third season of the adult animated science-fiction sitcom Rick and Morty in November 2015, Selman's The Vindicators was re-pitched as a spec script from Sarah Carbiener and Erica Rosbe, inspired by the superhero genre and Saw franchise. Carbiener stated that she managed to learn many things from her experience as a member of the writing team on the episode, stating that a story that for other shows would have been an entire episode, for Rick and Morty would only be its first few minutes, and as such, the team had to write a large amount of story in a very short time. The first Vindicators episode, "Vindicators 3: The Return of Worldender", premiered on August 13, 2017, as the fourth episode of the season.

=== Main characters ===
The first line of defense against evil. The guardians of the unguarded. Writers of their own press releases. Vance Maximus! Supernova! Alan Rails! Million Ants! Crocubot! They are… the Vindicators!

— J. Torres — Rick and Morty Presents: The Vindicators: Hero Mix Vol. 1 establishing text.

The main characters of the spin-off are the members of the superhero team the Vindicators, who band together to fight evil when it threatens to destroy the world, which consists of Vance Maximus, Supernova, Alan Rails Crocubot, and Million Ants, former members Lady Katana, Calypso, and Diablo Verde, and interns Noob Noob, Rick Sanchez, and Morty Smith. The team is inspired by the Marvel Comics teams Avengers and the Guardians of the Galaxy.

- Vance Maximus, Renegade Starsoldier, voiced by Christian Slater, is the leader of the Vindicators, who presents himself as a suave, friendly and fun-loving leader, while secretly being a coward who cracks under pressure, insulting Morty as "the learning-disabled kid we do photo ops with". He is a parody of Iron Man and Star-Lord.
- Supernova, Cosmic Heroine, voiced by Gillian Jacobs, is a star-themed superheroine previously married to Alan Rails, having an affair with Million Ants. She is a parody of Starfire, with a design inspired by Singularity.
- Alan Rails, Ghost Train Conductor, voiced by Lance Reddick, is a man who gained the ability to summon ghost trains after his parents were killed in a railroad accident. He wears a ghostly train whistle around his neck, which he uses to summon ghost trains. Originally married to Supernova, the pair separate after Supernova's affair with Million Ants leads to a cosmic miscarriage. He is a parody of Steel, with powers similar to Green Lantern. In Hero Mix Vol. 1, Alan Rails wears a simple t-shirt as his costume, inspired by Luke Cage.
- Crocubot, voiced by Maurice LaMarche, is a cyborg crocodile, about whom little is known other than his cold mechanical-reptilian logic, dancing in secret to alleviate stress.
- Million Ants, voiced by Tom Kenny, is a sentient ant colony who was originally given sentience by Supernova and became her adulterous lover when they were trapped on a planet for several days with no way of knowing if they would survive. He is a parody of Ant-Man, with a powerset inspired by Swarm and Clayface.
- Noob Noob, voiced by Justin Roiland, is the Vindicators' intern and janitor, who wishes to eventually become a full-fledged Vindicator, but is always made to stay behind and clean up their ship. In Hero Mix Vol. 1, an alternate Noob Noob becomes the supervillain Boon, before being torn apart by an army of Mr. Meeseeks.
- Richard "Rick" Sanchez, also voiced by Roiland, is a sociopathic, nihilistic, narcissistic, self-centered, alcoholic mad scientist who reluctantly allies with the Vindicators.
  - Pickle Rick – An insane alternate reality lightning-infused pickle version of Rick, who harnesses the "Sour Force" from the brinestream in order to go full-sour and "fix time" after breaking it. He is a parody of the Flash. In Hero Mix Vol. 1, Pickle Rick is eaten alive by Boon.
- Mortimer "Morty" Smith Sr., also voiced by Roiland, is Rick's neurotic 14-year-old grandson, and one of the Vindicators' interns.
- Lady Katana, voiced by Ally Maki, is an Asian cyborg-ninja first mentioned in "Vindicators 3: The Return of Worldender" as having died. After making her official debut in the prequel comic book arc "Vindicators 1", published by Oni Press, the character returned in the animated miniseries Vindicators 2.
- Calypso, voiced by Cyrina Fiallo, is a South American shaman, who wields a magic staff and can summon blue flames from her hand, first mentioned in "Vindicators 3: The Return of Worldender" as having died. After making her official debut in the prequel comic book arc "Vindicators 1", published by Oni Press, the character returned in the animated miniseries Vindicators 2.
- Diablo Verde, voiced by Christian Lanz, is a Mexican superhero first mentioned in "Vindicators 3: The Return of Worldender" as having died. After making her official debut in the prequel comic book arc "Vindicators 1", published by Oni Press, the character returned in the animated miniseries Vindicators 2, in which she is revealed to be a woman, in spite of a large, muscular physical appearance, with horns, green skin, and a moustache.
- Scarepool, voiced by Jess Harnell, is an eyepatch-wearing anti-hero version of Scary "Terry" Terrence recovering from cancer. He is a parody of Freddy Krueger and Deadpool. In Hero Mix Vol. 1, Scarepool is crushed underfoot by Boon.
- Planetina, voiced by Alison Brie, is an environmental-themed superhero who is Morty's ex-girlfriend. She is a parody of Captain Planet from Captain Planet and the Planeteers, although lacking a heart ring. Initially an independent superhero, she returns as the leader of the New Vindicators in Rick and Morty: The End.
- Sleepy Gary, voiced by Matt Walsh, is a pyjama-wearing memory parasite regrown by Rick in Rick and Morty Presents following his death in "Total Rickall", before joining the New Vindicators in Rick and Morty: The End.
- Mr. Meeseeks, also voiced by Roiland, is a Meeseeks given the "impossible task" of killing Rick Sanchez, an act he intends to commit to finally die as a member of the New Vindicators.
- Titanium D, a member of the Alphabetrians from "Get Schwifty" and "Rise of the Numbericons: The Movie" who returns as a member of the New Vindicators.

Scrapped members included Dr. Reach, a man with stretching powers; conjoined twins, one fit and attractive, and the other not; a knitting grandmother, and Ventriloquiver, a character later incorporated into the fourth season episode "One Crew over the Crewcoo's Morty", voiced by Claudia Black.

== Television series ==
| Season | Episodes | Originally released | Network |
|---|---|---|---|
| "Vindicators 3: The Return of Worldender" | | August 13, 2017 | Adult Swim |
| Vindicators 2 | 10 | July 23, 2022 | YouTube |

=== "Vindicators 3: The Return of Worldender" (2017) ===
Depicting the third adventure of the Vindicators, "Vindicators 3: The Return of Worldender" follows Rick Sanchez and Morty Smith as they join the Vindicators again (following a previous offscreen adventure with the superhero team) to defeat a returned Worldender. However, a blackout Drunk Rick defeats Worldender alone the night before and sets up a series of Saw-inspired challenges for the Vindicators and his sober self to complete the next day, slowly turning the team against one another.

Written by Sarah Carbiener and Erica Rosbe and directed by Bryan Newton, "Vindicators 3: The Return of Worldender" premiered on August 13, 2017, as the fourth episode of the third season of the American adult animated science-fiction sitcom Rick and Morty.

=== Vindicators 2: Last Stand Between Earth and Doom (2022) ===
Depicting the second adventure of the Vindicators, the slice of life series explores the Vindicators (including a pregnant Supernova) as they protect the galaxy at large, while preparing to prevent the planet devourer Doom-Nomitron from destroying Earth.

On May 20, 2021, Adult Swim announced a short spin-off series entitled The Vindicators was in development, alongside spin-offs from other Adult Swim shows like Aqua Teen Hunger Force, Robot Chicken, and Your Pretty Face Is Going to Hell. The ten-episode series, now entitled Vindicators 2: Last Stand Between Earth and Doom, or simply Vindicators 2, premiered on Adult Swim's YouTube channel on July 23, 2022, with each episode being between two and three minutes, and character co-creator Carbiener serving as showrunner. The series centers on the Vindicators on their adventure before the events of "Vindicators 3: The Return of Worldender", along with original members Diablo Verde, Lady Katana and Calypso, the former Vindicators first mentioned in the episode Vindicators 1: Origin of the Vindicators. Carbiener and Rosbe told io9 that the short format of Vindicators 2 allowed them to explore non-standard plots and slice of life depictions of superheroes. Production took place over the videoconferencing software Zoom, with the main voice actors from the original Rick and Morty episode reprising their roles.

| No. | Title | Directed by | Written by | Original release date |
|---|---|---|---|---|
| 1 | "Rick Can Handle It" | Maite Garcia | Sarah Carbiener and Erica Rosbe | July 23, 2022 |
The Vindicators try to come up with plan to defeat the monster Doom-Nomitron approaching Earth. However, with Supernova unable to utilize her full powers due to being pregnant, the other Vindicators vote to leave the protection of Earth to Rick rather than risk their own lives for a planet they don't care for.
| 2 | "Pro-Nouns" | Maite Garcia | Sarah Carbiener and Erica Rosbe | July 23, 2022 |
During a party, Alan suggests to Million Ants that he start dating. Million Ants tries to register to a dating site, but when it asks him what pronouns he identifies himself by, Million Ants is at a loss since he considers himself male, but is controlled by a female queen ant, and consists of a million individual ants.
| 3 | "The Dance" | Maite Garcia | Sarah Carbiener and Erica Rosbe | July 23, 2022 |
After the Vindicators are sent reeling after a particularly violent battle, Crocubot secretly takes his leave to seclude himself in some ancient ruins so he can dance to relieve his stress.
| 4 | "Out of Gas" | Maite Garcia | Sarah Carbiener and Erica Rosbe | July 23, 2022 |
When the Vindicators' ship runs out of fuel, Alan offers to summon a ghost train to tow the ship to safety. However, the train he summons instead breaches a hole in the hull, threatening to suck the Vindicators out into space.
| 5 | "First Love" | Maite Garcia | Sarah Carbiener and Erica Rosbe | July 23, 2022 |
When the Vindicators' ship crash lands on an alien planet, Noob Noob rescues an alien girl named Drizz and they quickly befriend each other. Noob Noob bemoans that he had a plan to save Earth, but the other Vindicators don't take him seriously. However, he grows uncomfortable when he realizes Drizz may be underage by her species' standards and he flees.
| 6 | "Mercy Kill" | Maite Garcia | Sarah Carbiener and Erica Rosbe | July 23, 2022 |
Vance and Supernova slaughter an alien species invading another planet. They then contemplate mercy killing a mortally wounded alien but it dies before they can actually mercy kill it. Supernova then suffers a miscarriage, resulting in an explosion that destroys the planet they just saved.
| 7 | "Girls Night" | Maite Garcia | Sarah Carbiener and Erica Rosbe | July 23, 2022 |
Supernova goes to a nightclub with Calypso, Lady Katana, and Diablo Verde. However, she gets drunk and ends up inadvertently killing the other three Vindicators and the entire nightclub. Alan tries to comfort the emotionally distraught Supernova while Vance murders the bartender to silence him.
| 8 | "Kintsugi" | Maite Garcia | Sarah Carbiener and Erica Rosbe | July 23, 2022 |
Alan repairs a vase, and then summons a train that drives by and shatters it. Alan then picks up the pieces of the vase and begins to reassemble it again.
| 9 | "Little Trains" | Maite Garcia | Sarah Carbiener and Erica Rosbe | July 23, 2022 |
As Doom-Nomitron approaches Earth, it is easily killed by one of Rick's inventions. Supernova is ecstatic since they can take credit for Doom-Nomitron's death, cover up Calpyso, Lady Katana, and Diablo Verde's deaths as heroic sacrifices fighting the monster, and cover up the destruction of Dorian-5 as one of Doom-Nomitron's targets. However, Alan is disillusioned due to a combination of the team's mistakes, Supernova's miscarriage, and his own sexual impotence. Supernova then suggests they visit a healer that can help Alan forget his pain.
| 10 | "Heroes" | Maite Garcia | Sarah Carbiener and Erica Rosbe | July 23, 2022 |
The Vindicators attend an awards ceremony to honor them for Doom-Nomitron's defeat. Alan still has second thoughts due to stealing credit from Rick as well as their many other mistakes, but Vance insists that the villains are whoever they kill. As the ceremony goes underway, the Vindicators are hailed as heroes.

=== Future ===
Following the series premiere of Vindicators 2 in July 2022, series showrunner Sarah Carbiener expressed interest in further seasons of the series being produced. In January 2023, following Justin Roiland's firing from the franchise, it was announced that his voice roles (including the Vindicator Noob Noob in any future seasons of The Vindicators) would be recast.

== Comic books ==
| No. | Title | Release date | ISBN |
|---|---|---|---|
| Rick and Morty Presents Vol. 1 | Rick and Morty Presents: The Vindicators: Hero Mix Vol. 1 | March 7, 2018 | 978-1-6201-0552-8 |
| Rick and Morty Vol. 9 | Rick and Morty: Origin of the Vindicators (Vindicators 1) | November 28, 2018 | 978-1-6201-0641-9 |

=== The Vindicators: Hero Mix Vol. 1 (2018) ===
Using the franchise's established premise of alternate timelines, the first issue of the spin-off anthology series Rick and Morty Presents, written by J. Torres and titled The Vindicators: Hero Mix Vol. 1, features Rick Sanchez and Morty Smith encountering the "All-New All-Different" Vindicators sometime after their deaths, revived by Supernova, who now has a cyborg arm as a result of using her powers to resurrect them, and who reluctantly recruit Rick and Morty again to assist them in saving the multiverse against Boon, a corrupted evil version of Noob Noob, recruiting Scary Terry / Scarepool and an alternate reality Pickle Rick to the team. Primarily illustrated by CJ Cannon, the front cover was designed by Jen Bartel.

=== Vindicators 1: Origin of the Vindicators (2018) ===
In November 2018, the ninth volume of the Oni Press comic book series Rick and Morty, written by Kyle Starks, featured Vindicators 1: The Origin of the Vindicators, adapted as the series' forty-fifth issue overall. Characters from the comic were later adapted to the animated miniseries Vindicators 2.

=== Rick and Morty: Crisis on C-137 (2022–2023) ===
The Vindicators are featured as major characters in the Oni Press comic book series Rick and Morty: Crisis on C-137, with Rick and Morty forced to form a new team of Vindicators to defend the galaxy against a threat from beyond time, led by Master Meeseeks, after Supernova crashes back onto Earth.

=== Rick and Morty: The End (2025–2026) ===
The New Vindicators are featured as major characters in the Oni Press comic book series Rick and Morty: The End, continuing from the cliffhanger ending of Rick and Morty vs. the Universe. In the series, a new team of Vindicators called the New Vindicators (or "VindRickators") led by Morty Smith's ex-girlfriend Planetina team up with him to track down the now-fugitive Rick Sanchez, wanted for killing the embodiment of the Prime Universe while blackout drunk. Supernova is also featured in the series as a juror on Rick's trial, confused as to why she was not invited to join the new team.

== Short films ==
Vindicators, a short film written, directed, and animated solely by animator Paul Robertson, in the style of a 16-bit video game, aired on Adult Swim as promotion for the fourth season of Rick and Morty in May 2020, before being uploaded to Robertson's own YouTube channel later that August.

On April 30, 2021, a 17-minute pixel art-animated short film, titled Rick + Morty in the Eternal Nightmare Machine, was aired on Adult Swim (and uploaded to YouTube) to promote the then-upcoming fifth season of Rick and Morty. The film, featuring characters from The Vindicators in supporting roles, was also written, directed, and animated by Robertson.

== Video games ==
In September 2017, the Vindicators Noob Noob and Vindicator Morty were added as playable characters to the Pokémon-inspired free-to-play role-playing video game Pocket Mortys for iOS and Android.

== Merchandise ==
Several licensed Funko Pops and Mystery Minis have been made based on characters of the Rick and Morty franchise, including the Vindicators.

== Reception ==
Reviewing the episode "Vindicators 3: The Return of Worldender", Jesse Schedeen of IGN complimented the "fun twists" and "bleaker tone" of the titular team, with Greene of IndieWire praised the vocal performance of the Vindicators, approving of the "nice bit of misdirection" their characterisation. Jack Shepherd of The Independent similarly praised the episode as "one of their funniest, most deranged adventures [of Rick and Morty] yet", praising its use of superhero tropes.

Reviewing the miniseries Vindicators 2: Last Stand Between Earth and Doom, Rafael Motamayor of /Film described the series as "far from groundbreaking or even that surprising", initially criticising the short length of each episode and how each episode would "mostly [amount] to a single visual joke", before ultimately finding the series as a whole to be a "fun and harmless" way to "revisit these characters, make fun superhero stories, and expand on the implications of the heroes' wild powers".
