= Night Family =

- Rick and Morty episode
- Episode no.: Season 6 Episode 4
- Directed by: Jacob Hair
- Written by: Rob Schrab
- Production code: RAM-605
- Original air date: September 25, 2022

Episode chronology
← Previous "Bethic Twinstinct"	Next → "Final DeSmithation"
- Rick and Morty (season 6)

"Night Family" is the fourth episode of the sixth season of the Adult Swim animated television series Rick and Morty. It was written by Rob Schrab and directed by Jacob Hair.

== Plot ==
At breakfast, Rick introduces his family to a "Somnambulator", a device which can make their unconscious bodies perform tasks while they sleep. Bodies under the influence of the device are referred to as "Night People".

The family use the Somnambulator to make their unconscious selves do all the chores they don't want to do in their waking hours, with the exception of Jerry, who treats his Night Person as a pen pal. When Night Jerry writes a letter requesting that the family rinse their dishes before going to bed, Rick becomes incensed and leaves a mess for the Night People to clean up. This prompts the Night People to rise up against the "Daymanoids" (as they call their conscious selves). Under the leadership of Night Summer, they hijack the Somnambulator and create an army of robots, which they use to enslave the Daymanoids. The Daymanoids effect an escape, but Night Summer chases them down and sedates them, causing them to become Night People permanently.

As the credits roll it shows the Night People enjoying lavish vacations and concerts halls. In a post-credits scene, the Night People, having blown all their money and grown tired of life, destroy the Somnambulator, allowing the awakened family to continue as normal. The family are horrified to learn that the Choco Taco was permanently discontinued while they were asleep.

== Production ==
The thing that we stumbled upon is, what if Summer was the Big Bad of the episode? What if this teenage girl turned into a ponytailed Hannibal Lector? (Rob Schrab)

It really emerges that Summer's resentments, her deep-seated problems with her grandfather are taking shape in the form of this rebellion of the night family. (Jacob Hair)

Before season six's release, the episode titles were informally revealed, including "Night Family's". On the September 19 and 21, extended previews were released. In advance, the episode was projected to release on Sunday, September 25, 11pm in the United States, and 4 am in the United Kingdom.

In the video Inside The Episode: "Night Family" on Adult Swim's YouTube channel, Rick and Morty co-creator Dan Harmon explains that the episode concept was carried down for many years. While writing, Rob Schrab came across the question "...what if Summer was the Big Bad of the episode?". The prospect of an Evil Summer dates back to August 2021, where Spencer Grammer, her voice actor, gave hints.

=== Themes and cultural references ===
The introductory poem at the beginning of the episode is Fragment of an Agon by T.S. Eliot. The term "Daymanoid", used throughout the episode, derives from the word "Demonoid", coming from the 1981 Mexican horror film Demonoid: Messenger of Death. Some news outlets claim that the episode takes traits from, or directly parodies Apple TV+'s Severance.

== Ratings and critical reception ==
The review aggregator website Rotten Tomatoes reported a 100% approval rating with an average score of 8.3/10 based on 7 reviews.

"Night Family" was watched by roughly 300,000 people in the United States.

This episode was generally well received, like the first three episodes of the season. Corey Plante of Inverse compared the episode to the 2019 Jordan Peele film Us and the made-for-streaming series Severance. He appreciated the heavy horror themes of the episode, which he says was accentuated by Ryan Elder's score. Den of Geek author Joe Matar said that the story being set in the Smith household and featuring the entire Smith family worked well. Matar continued that the science fiction concepts worked well because the family drama, which he says was lacking in seasons 4-5, worked in collaboration. Collider's Marco Vito Oddo wrote that it was the most lacking episode of the season thus far, but still explored the "absurd limits of a simple plot". In their 'A'-graded review of the episode, Richard Urquiza of winteriscoming.net, a subsidiary of FanSided, stated that it was the best episode of the season so far, with comedy, a funny story, and a neat concept. Maik Zehrfeld gave a 4/5 star review, writing that the opening was too akin to Family Guy, but it picked up as it continued, showing a domino effect narrative structure and a "catchy story".

=== Awards and nominations ===
Year	Award	Category	Result	Ref.
2023	Annie Awards	Best Mature Audience Animated Television/Broadcast Production	Nominated	
2023	Primetime Emmy Awards	Outstanding Animated Program	Nominated	
