= Solaricks =

- Rick and Morty episode
- Episode no.: Season 6 Episode 1
- Directed by: Jacob Hair
- Written by: Albro Lundy
- Production code: RAM-601
- Original air date: September 4, 2022
- Running time: 22 minutes

Episode chronology
← Previous "Rickmurai Jack"	Next → "Rick: A Mort Well Lived"
- Rick and Morty (season 6)

"Solaricks" is the premiere episode of the sixth season of the Adult Swim animated television series Rick and Morty. It is the 52nd episode of the series overall. Written by Albro Lundy and directed by Jacob Hair, the episode was broadcast on September 4, 2022. The episode directly follows the events of the previous season finale, "Rickmurai Jack".

== Plot ==
After getting stranded in the remains of the Citadel, (Note: As depicted in "Rickmurai Jack" (2021).) Rick and Morty are rescued by Space Beth and brought home. Rick tries to fix his portal gun from Evil Morty's sabotage by resetting the portal fluid, but instead accidentally causes a glitch that causes all people who have used portals to be sent back to their original dimensions – this includes Jerry, due to the events of "Mortynight Run". He gives Summer instructions on how to get them back before the portal travelers are zapped away: Jerry to his original dimension after the mix-up at the Jerryboree, Morty to the Cronenberged dimension, and Rick to Dimension C-137.

Rick gathers materials he needs from his old house while conversing with D.I.A.N.E., an AI of his deceased wife Diane Sanchez he once created to "haunt" him. Rick decides to move on from avenging Diane's death. As he is departing the dimension through a wormhole created by Summer, however, D.I.A.N.E. suggests that the Rick Prime, who killed Diane and his original Beth (Note: As depicted in "The Rickshank Redemption" (2017).) would also have been sent back to his original dimension by Rick's mistake with the portal fluid. In the Cronenberged dimension, Morty encounters his Jerry, who travels by himself after the deaths of his Beth and Summer (Note: As depicted in "Look Who's Cronenberging Now" (2018).) and has adopted a Rick-like nihilistic philosophy. Rick arrives to pick up Morty and reveals that the Cronenberged dimension is Rick Prime's home dimension, and that Rick had originally settled with Rick Prime's family hoping that he would one day catch him if he returned. They break into Rick Prime's lair, finding him in a tube while pre-recordings of Rick Prime mock Rick C-137 and claim that he may or may not be a clone.

Space Beth finds herself caught up in a dispute between Beth and Summer. The pair of Beths argue over who Summer prefers while raiding the Citadel and fighting off five-dimensional monsters that came from the wormhole, though Summer is able to convince them to back down. After Rick and Morty return and save them from aliens, they retrieve Jerry from his original dimension, one where he and Beth were not briefly divorced.

The family returns to Dimension C-131, where they encounter the "Season Two" Jerry who was brought back to the house and has been taking a shower upstairs while waiting for them to sort everything out. However, he accidentally unleashes a cute but deadly parasitic creature named Mr. Frundles that takes over and destroys the world in a mere 30 seconds, forcing the entire family plus Space Beth to move to yet another replacement dimension, where they coincidentally died at the exact moment of "natural" causes – the only major difference being that residents of this dimension pronounce "parmesan" strangely. (Note: /pɑːrmiːzjiːɪn/ par-MEE-zee-in) In the new dimension, Beth and Space Beth make peace with each other, while Morty asks Rick if he's being used as bait for Rick Prime. Rick tells him that Rick Prime simply does not care about his family, remarking that in many ways, Rick Prime is the "real deal".

In the post-credits scene, Jerry from the Cronenberged dimension encounters Rick Prime, who really had been inside the tube, and inquires about the whereabouts of Rick and Morty. Jerry feigns interest in an alliance to defeat the two before slashing Rick Prime's throat. Rick Prime reveals he can heal quickly and promptly shoots Jerry, expressing some admiration for Jerry's unusual ruthlessness before finishing him off and wondering how he himself was transported into the dimension.

== Production ==
"Solaricks" was written by Albro Lundy and directed by Jacob Hair. The episode is dedicated to producer Mike Mendel, who died on September 22, 2019. Lundy and co-creator Dan Harmon considered Morty's return to the Cronenberged dimension as punishment for his and Rick's callousness about jumping dimensions, and note that Jerry is now "perfect" without the presence of the rest of the family.

=== Cultural references ===
The episode's title is a reference to Stanisław Lem's 1961 novel Solaris, which also features a protagonist haunted by a recreation of his dead wife.

Several pop culture references and homages are presented throughout the episode. Samantha Nelson of IGN discussed how the episode mirrored Avengers: Endgame, which the episode mentions in the cold open. Summer access a vending machine with items from Marvel characters, including Thor's hammer, Cyclops' visor, Magneto's helmet, and Summer chooses "Wolverine claws". Jerry refers to Mr. Frundles as a "boogen", referencing to the 1981 monster horror film, The Boogens. The Cronenberged dimension's Jerry says "Fatality, Jerry wins!" in reference to the gameplay feature in the Mortal Kombat series of fighting video games; as well as mentioning Don Miguel Ruiz's self-help book The Four Agreements, Elizabeth Gilbert's memoir Eat, Pray, Love, and Frank Miller's graphic novel The Dark Knight Returns. Beth says that she acted like a Dance Mom.

== Reception ==
The review aggregator website Rotten Tomatoes reported a 100% approval rating with an average score of 8.0/10 based on 11 reviews. The site's critical consensus reads: "Capitalizing on the previous season finale's cliffhanger to deliver even more surprises and a surplus of laughs, "Solaricks" is a sterling start to Rick and Morty's sixth season of demented misadventures."

Samantha Nelson of IGN rated the episode 9 out of 10, saying the season was "off to a fantastic start", praising how the premiere "looks back at previous seasons as a way to demonstrate just how much it has grown", while noting its similarities to Avengers: Endgame. Steve Greene of IndieWire graded it an A. Den of Geek's Joe Matar was more mixed on the episode, describing it as "kind of a slog" hoping that "now that all this complicated exposition has been done away with, things can take on a slightly brisker pace".
