= Vindicators 3: The Return of Worldender =

- Rick and Morty episode
- Episode no.: Season 3 Episode 4
- Directed by: Bryan Newton
- Written by: Sarah Carbiener and Erica Rosbe
- Original air date: August 13, 2017
- Running time: 23 minutes

Guest appearances
- Lance Reddick as Alan Rails; Maurice LaMarche as Crocubot; Tom Kenny as Million Ants; Gillian Jacobs as Supernova; Christian Slater as Vance Maximus; Logic as himself

Episode chronology
| ← Previous "Pickle Rick" | Next → "The Whirly Dirly Conspiracy" |
- Rick and Morty season 3

"Vindicators 3: The Return of Worldender" is the fourth episode of the third season of the Adult Swim animated television series Rick and Morty. Written by Sarah Carbiener and Erica Rosbe and directed by Bryan Newton, the episode premiered on August 13, 2017. Parodying many superhero movie tropes, "Vindicators 3" sees Rick and Morty join the Vindicators in a mission to defeat Worldender. However, a drunken Rick defeats Worldender alone and sets up a series of Saw-inspired challenges for the Vindicators to complete the next day; by morning, he has forgotten the entire event. The episode received positive reviews and was watched by an estimated 2.66 million viewers upon its premiere.

Two spin-off comic series, Rick and Morty Presents: The Vindicators and "Origin of the Vindicators" (Vindicators 1), have been published by Oni Press, while a prequel series of ten two- to three-minute shorts—Vindicators 2: Last Stand Between Earth and Doom—was released in July 2022.

== Plot ==
Morty invokes his deal with Rick to choose every tenth adventure in order to answer the Vindicators' call for help, having previously worked with them off-screen. As the group are briefed on the dangers of Worldender, an irritated Rick interrupts to insult the superheroes Supernova, Million Ants, Crocubot, Alan Rails and Vance Maximus. The only Vindicator he does not attack is Noob-Noob. In the meeting, Morty is upset to discover that the Vindicators met for a second adventure that Rick and Morty were not invited to.

The next morning, the Vindicators arrive at the briefing room to discover an unconscious Rick in a puddle of diarrhea. Noob-Noob stays behind to clean while the rest of the group leave to defeat Worldender. As a groggy Rick awakens, he destroys an automated turret which was firing at the group. They soon find Worldender and his henchman already killed. A large screen descends on which a drunken Rick from the night before begins to monologue.

Inspired by the 2004 film Saw, Rick has set the Vindicators tasks to complete; if they leave or fail then they will be killed. Vance attempts to leave through a ventilation duct, setting off traps which violently kill him. As Alan threatens to kill Rick, Morty announces that he has solved the first puzzle, in which descriptions have to be matched to each Vindicator. Any matching is valid, Rick's point being that they are all functionally the same.

The second puzzle is to choose the place on a map that the Vindicators refuse to speak about. Crocubot is killed with the wrong guess Dorian 5, a planet that the group exterminated, but Morty understands the solution is Israel, which Rick habitually rants about while drunk. In the third puzzle, the group try to score basketball three-point field goals while Morty aims to disarm a neutrino bomb. However, argument breaks out over Supernova's past relationships with Rails and Million Ants. Supernova breaks up a fight between Rails and Million Ants with a force field but Million Ants still kills Rails.

The last task is to place on a platform the only part of the Vindicators which Rick values. Rick thinks it is Morty, who stands on the platform and is transported to a chamber meant for Noob-Noob where Rick on video says how much he appreciates Noob-Noob. Back in the lair, Supernova kills Million Ants and is prevented from killing Rick by a party planned by drunk Rick which suddenly breaks out, at which Logic performs.

== Production ==
Voice actor Justin Roiland made himself drunk from four or five glasses of tequila in order to play a drunken Rick for this episode.

The Vindicators featured in the first of a series of official comics, Rick and Morty Presents. Released on March 7, 2018, by Oni Press, Rick and Morty Presents: The Vindicators! was written by J. Torres and illustrated by CJ Cannon. The front cover was designed by Jen Bartel. Additionally, Oni Press published "Origin of the Vindicators" (Vindicators 1) on November 28, 2018.

== Analysis ==
The episode satirizes superhero movies. Steve Greene of IndieWire wrote that the superheroes are not a direct parody of one specific superhero team, though Hannah Mylrea of NME compared Vance to Star-Lord and Supernova to Teen Titans' Starfire. Jack Shepherd of The Independent and Greene found Noob Noob similar to season 2 "Total Rickall" character Mr. Poopybutthole. Greene found the reference to the lack of diversity amongst the Vindicators after the previous deaths of superheroes of color similar to a reference in the previous episode "Pickle Rick" to Dr. Wong being a poor choice of name for a character voiced by the non-Asian Susan Sarandon.

Previous episodes have also positioned Rick as a villain, with the season premiere "The Rickshank Rickdemption" also demonstrating a growing friction between Rick and Morty and a maturity in Morty. It continues a theme in season 3 of exploring Sanchez family dynamics, and of featuring a bleaker tone. Unlike many other episodes, "Vindicators 3" does not feature a B-story.

== Reception ==
The episode first aired on Adult Swim at 11:30 p.m. on August 13, 2017, where it was watched by 2.66 million viewers.

Jesse Schedeen of IGN rated the episode 8.5 out of 10, praising the "fun twists" and the humorous dynamic between sober Rick and drunk Rick. Schedeen praised that the ending subverted a past pattern of Rick showing genuine affection whilst drunk. With a B rating, Greene found the episode entertaining in parts, though thinking that it was too similar to season 1's "Anatomy Park". He praised the Vindicator guest stars, approving of the "nice bit of misdirection" in Slater's character being killed first. Shepherd found the episode "one of their funniest, most deranged adventures yet", praising its use of superhero tropes.

== Spin-off series ==
On May 20, 2021, Adult Swim announced a short prequel spin-off series entitled The Vindicators was in development, alongside spin-offs from other Adult Swim shows like Aqua Teen Hunger Force, Robot Chicken, and Your Pretty Face Is Going to Hell. The ten-episode series was released on YouTube on July 23, 2022, titled The Vindicators 2. Each episode is between two and three minutes long. The series centers on the characters Supernova, Vance Maxiumus, Alan Rails, Crocubot, and Noob Noob, loosely adapting the events of "Origin of the Vindicators" (Vindicators 1) and Vindicators 2. It was written by Sarah Carbiener and Erica Rosbe, who told i09 that the short format allowed them to explore non-standard plots and slice of life depictions of superheroes. Production took place over the videoconferencing software Zoom. The main voice actors from the episode reprise their roles.

The shorts depict the Vindicators' second adventure, such as how Supernova destroyed the populated planet of Dorian 5 after having a miscarriage with Million Ants' children and mistakenly killed three of the other teammates (Lady Katana, Calypso, and Diablo Verde) after she got blackout drunk. It shows how Rick killed the planet eating Doom-Nomitron with a satellite that had a "set it and forget it" trap, though the Vindicators take credit for saving the galaxy.

Writing for /Film, Rafael Motamayor reviewed that the series is "far from groundbreaking or even that surprising" and, due to the length, each episode "mostly [amounts] to a single visual joke". However, Motamayor found it a "fun and harmless" way to "revisit these characters, make fun superhero stories, and expand on the implications of the heroes' wild powers".
