= Rickmancing the Stone =

- Rick and Morty episode
- Episode no.: Season 3 Episode 2
- Directed by: Dominic Polcino
- Written by: Jane Becker
- Original air date: July 30, 2017
- Running time: 22 minutes

Guest appearances
- Tony Hale as Eli; Joel McHale as Hemorrhage

Episode chronology
| ← Previous "The Rickshank Rickdemption" | Next → "Pickle Rick" |
- Rick and Morty season 3

"Rickmancing the Stone" is the second episode of the third season of the American science fiction television series Rick and Morty. Released on July 30, 2017, it follows main characters Rick Sanchez and Morty Smith as they enter a post-apocalyptic world to find the gemstone by the name of Isotope 322, also bringing Morty's sister Summer with them. The episode was written by Jane Becker and directed by Dominic Polcino. The title is a reference to the 1984 film Romancing the Stone with Michael Douglas.

== Plot ==
Now divorced from Beth after the events of the previous episode, Jerry bids goodbye to Morty, an apathetic Summer and Rick and moves out of the house. Rick takes Morty and Summer to a post-apocalyptic version of Earth, where they are chased by a group of scavengers, known as Death Stalkers. Rick notices that the group is carrying a valuable rock of Isotope 322, so he and the kids join them in hope of stealing it. Summer falls in love with the Death Stalkers' leader Hemorrhage and their nihilistic lifestyle, while Morty is given the strength of a giant arm which he uses to vent his rage at his father through fighting in the Blood Dome.

Rick steals the rock but is found out and pursued by the Death Stalkers. When Morty and Summer refuse to go with him, having found catharsis in the post-apocalyptic wasteland from their parents' divorce, he replaces them with androids to fool Beth. However the androids well-adjusted behaviour causes Beth to doubt her decision to divorce Jerry, forcing him to return to retrieve the real Summer and Morty.

Morty's arm takes him in search of its previous owner's killer, after whose death the arm returns to normal and Morty decides to return home. He and Rick help the Death Stalkers use the Isotope to power a more advanced civilization. Summer's relationship with Hemorrhage subsequently falls apart in the comfort of modern suburbia and she decides to follow Rick and Morty back home. Before leaving, Rick steals the isotope.

Summer reconciles with Jerry and Morty realizes he must live his own life. In the post-credits scene, as Jerry receives his unemployment check, a growling wolf appears and bullies him into handing it over. The wolf eats the check and regurgitates it, thus further ruining Jerry's new life.

== Production ==
On August 12, 2015, shortly after the premiere of the second season, the show was renewed for a third season. The first episode of Rick and Morty season three, entitled "The Rickshank Rickdemption", was released on April 1, 2017, as part of Adult Swim annual April Fools' Day prank. The rest of the episodes weren't released until later that year, starting with "Rickmancing the Stone" on July 30, airing weekly until October 1, 2017. The title of the episode was revealed on July 13, 2017. Later that month, on July 20, Jane Becker announced on Twitter that she would write "Rickmancing the Stone". The episode is also directed by Dominic Polcino. The episode stars Justin Roiland as Rick Sanchez and Morty Smith, Chris Parnell as Jerry Smith, Spencer Grammer as Summer Smith, and Sarah Chalke as Beth Smith. Tony Hale and Joel McHale make guest appearances in the episode as "wastelanders" Eli, a neighbor, and Hemorrhage, the latter of which eventually forms a relationship with Summer.

The episode is loosely based on the Mad Max franchise. It also follows the aftermath of Beth and Jerry Smith's divorce in the previous episode. The A.V. Club called the different family members' unique reaction to the divorce "a surprisingly nuanced take on a complicated, emotionally fraught situation," also noting how, even though the episode is mainly about Summer's storyline, "it's balanced well enough between her and her brother." The website also claims, "Summer has Beth’s anger, Morty has Jerry's ineffectual morality, but each of them is distinctly enough themselves to be a plausible family. As ever, it's impressive how well the show manages to mix high-concept genre riffs with drama in a way that never becomes belabored, detached, or forced." The Rad-Lands said that writing in the episode was "intensely off its normal cadence in this episode."

== Reception ==
The season has an approval rating of 96% from Rotten Tomatoes based on 10 reviews, and an average rating of 8.95 out of 10. "Rickmancing the Stone" was praised for its plot and characterization, in addition to the fact that it "wasn’t just a recap of all the consequences of [the previous episode]." On its air date, the episode was watched by 2.86 million American viewers and has the highest viewership of the whole series. Despite criticizing the episode for both storylines in the episode (saying "That’s not nuance, that’s just bad writing."), The Rad-Lands complemented the episode's post-apocalyptic setting and the animation techniques used to portray those scene, as well as not being generic. The review website said, "Everything has a uniquely 80’s sci-fi style with brilliant and vibrant color schemes ... Every single wastelander has a unique character design, even when there are dozens of them on screen at time." The Rad-Lands also criticized the writing in the episode.

Bubbleblabber called the episode "very funny and very indicative of popular episodes of show’s past," also praising Summer's storyline and her character growth in the episode. The review also said that the plot was "really fleshing out [the] divorce bit and trying something new that could take the franchise to that next Emmy level of story-telling." Den of Geek criticized the wait between seasons, saying of "Rickmancing the Stone" that it "wasn’t quite the tour de force that the premiere was, but this was still a very well-plotted, pretty funny episode." The media website also praised the complexity of the plot, saying it "sh[ook]-up [the] character dynamics, rather than just relegating it to the background or quickly resolving it." IGN noted that the episode "basically played out as an extended Mad Max parody," saying it focused to much on parodying other works that developing its own plots and that it "never felt like "Rickmancing the Stone" had anything particularly insightful to say." IndieWire also praised Summer in the episode, saying "This is one of the lightest “Rick and Morty” episodes in a while ... This was a chance for the show to riff on one of the biggest movies made during its hiatus while also sneaking in a not-so-subtle allegory to a family slowly being torn apart."

== See also ==
- Legacy and influence of Mad Max in popular culture
