= Pickle Rick =

- Rick and Morty episode
- Rick as a pickle after escaping from the sewers. Several dozen rat suit designs were made for the episode, and critics praised the animation as well as the food choice of a pickle.
- Episode no.: Season 3 Episode 3
- Directed by: Anthony Chun
- Written by: Jessica Gao
- Original air date: August 6, 2017
- Running time: 23 minutes

Guest appearances
- Susan Sarandon as Dr. Wong; Danny Trejo as Jaguar; Peter Serafinowicz as Foreign Government Agency Director Pavel Bartek

Episode chronology
← Previous "Rickmancing the Stone"	Next → "Vindicators 3: The Return of Worldender"
- Rick and Morty season 3

"Pickle Rick" is the third episode of the third season of the Adult Swim animated television series Rick and Morty. Written by Jessica Gao and directed by Anthony Chun, the episode premiered on August 6, 2017. The plot follows eccentric scientist Rick Sanchez as he turns himself into a pickle to avoid attending a family therapy session.

The episode parodies action films and was inspired by the Breaking Bad episode "4 Days Out". In a continuation of the third season's storyline of Beth and Jerry's divorce, "Pickle Rick" explores Beth's unhealthy relationship with Rick and their views on intelligence and self-improvement. The episode was highly anticipated, with a rough cut animation premiering at the 2016 San Diego Comic-Con, and was watched by 2.3 million viewers when it first aired on Adult Swim.

The episode received positive reviews, with critics praising the animation and design of Pickle Rick, the fight scenes, the performance of guest actor Danny Trejo (as Jaguar), and the episode's ending. It won Rick and Morty the 2018 Primetime Emmy Award for Outstanding Animated Program, the show's first Emmy Award. Several merchandise products, particularly of the character Pickle Rick, have been released.

== Plot ==
As Beth, Morty, and Summer prepare for family counseling, Rick informs Morty that he cannot go, having turned himself into a pickle. He denies that he timed the experiment to avoid the counseling session, but the family notices a telltale mechanism rigged to drop a syringe in him soon after they leave. Beth takes the syringe, leaving Rick alone on his workbench.

Rick is knocked off the bench by a cat and then washed into the sewer during a rain shower. Lacking any means of mobility, he bites the head of a cockroach and walks upon its back by stimulating its brain with his tongue. After assembling more cockroaches into a crude exoskeleton, he sets up a lab and upgrades to a powered exoskeleton made from a rat corpse. He escapes the sewer via jetpack into a secure compound, where he kills several guards. The compound's administrator Pavel Bartek sends a prisoner named Jaguar to fight Rick, but Rick persuades Jaguar to join him, and they escape together in the administrator's helicopter after rigging the compound to explode.

Meanwhile, the therapist Dr. Wong is curious about Rick's absence despite Beth's attempts to shift attention to the children. Wong suggests Beth and Rick's shared aversion to emotion and vulnerability is at the root of the family's problems. As the group is saying I-messages to communicate their feelings, Rick enters to get the syringe. He admits lying to get out of therapy because he prefers to improve the world through science rather than feel better about it. Wong responds that he uses his scientific intelligence to avoid the necessary work of self-improvement. Rick stares at her silently, thinking.

On the way home, Rick apologizes to Beth for lying, then uses the syringe to turn back into a human. Morty and Summer express interest in further therapy but Rick and Beth ignore them by mocking Wong and planning to go out drinking.

In a post-credits scene, the villain Concerto is preparing to kill a restrained Rick and Morty in his gigantic piano, but Jaguar saves them. Rick tells Morty, "that is why you don't go to therapy."

== Production ==
I think it was a case of somebody just saying, 'What if we started the episode this way, with him turning himself into a pickle?' [...] Then the question became, 'If we say yes to that, why would he have turned himself into a pickle?' And the first answer was, 'Well, because he could and Rick is his own worst enemy and he'd want to prove himself.' Then the family therapy concept came in there because we started asking ourselves how could we keep addressing the divorce story of the season.

— Dan Harmon, Interview with Fast Company.

The episode was written by Jessica Gao. Series creator Dan Harmon said that he thought the concept originated from a writer suggesting an episode beginning with Rick turning himself into a pickle. They discussed his motivation and thought that he would do it "because he could" and to prove something to himself. The therapy subplot was introduced so that the episode would "keep addressing the divorce story of the season". He also said that the Pickle Rick design is phallic and "emblematic of self-torture", as Rick is his "own worst enemy" and does this transformation to himself.

"Pickle Rick" was one of Harmon's favorite episodes of the season. He said that the episode took inspiration from the Breaking Bad episode "4 Days Out", where Walter White's recreational vehicle breaks down in the desert while he is cooking crystal meth with Jesse Pinkman; rather than being able to trick or negotiate with anyone, White has to use his science knowledge to survive and restart the van. Harmon thought it was interesting to see Rick in a situation with limited resources. Writer Ryan Ridley said that the episode is "not a spoof of anything in particular", but it does make reference to the films 127 Hours (2010) and Gravity (2013). During the writing process, Harmon was undergoing a divorce and had entered therapy, which influenced the episode: he said of the speech Dr. Wong gives to Rick, "I don't know if I could've written that two years ago [...] I would've made sure Rick got the final word".

The character Dr. Wong was named by Gao, a Chinese writer who had found that unless a character is given a name with racial connotations, the part will be cast as a white person. Gao intended Wong to be played by an Asian actor. Guest star Susan Sarandon was then discovered to be available and given the role of the therapist, whose name was left unchanged. Gao and Harmon discussed this topic in their podcast Whiting Wongs, which is about diversity representation in television; it took its name from this incident.

Character designer Kendra Melton estimated that Pickle Rick's rat suit underwent 100 different design versions. Maximus Pauson, also a character designer, stated that the one used was chosen so it "emphasized the pickle-ness". Harmon commented that initial designs for the rats were "too adorable" considering that Rick murders many of them: Melton said that fur was removed, boils were added and their backs became more arched. According to Harmon, the writers gave more detailed instructions to animators than for most episodes, in particular "about the process of hacking the cockroach to give Rick mobility".

=== Release and merchandise ===
At the 2016 San Diego Comic-Con, a rough cut animation of "Pickle Rick" was released, featuring him in the sewer attacking rats. As the second season of the show ended with Rick jailed, this led some fans to believe that this was how he would escape, leading to confusion when the third-season premiere was released on April 1, 2017, and showed Rick escaping in a very different way. Three weeks prior to the episode's airing, free Pickle Rick T-shirts and other merchandise were given away at the 2017 San Diego Comic-Con. Due to the episode's hype prior to its release, including fans getting tattoos of Pickle Rick, Harmon was not surprised by its later popularity.

The episode first aired on Adult Swim at 11:30 p.m. on August 6, 2017. Afterward, a number of merchandise products were released relating to the character Pickle Rick and the overall episode, such as a game, Funko Pop figures, a Pringles flavor, a Frosty drink, a breakfast cereal, and in-game customization for Tom Clancy's Rainbow Six Siege. The episode commentary on the Blu-ray DVD was recorded by Game of Thrones creators David Benioff and D.B. Weiss, and Peter Dinklage, who played Tyrion Lannister in the series. The comic Rick and Morty Presents: The Vindicators #1 features an alternate Pickle Rick as a member of the titular team; Rick and Morty Presents: Pickle Rick #1 depicts an alternate version of the events of the episode as a long commercial for "Thunderous Squirt Xtreme" starring the character Mr. Poopybutthole. Rick and Morty Presents: Jaguar #1 follows the character Jaguar as he reunites with his family.

== Analysis ==
Unlike the previous two episodes in the season, "Pickle Rick" is set entirely on Earth, but like those episodes, it explores Beth and Jerry's divorce. This marks a change for the show, which previously had little storyline continuity. Jenny Jaffe of Vulture described the episode as an instance of how Rick and Morty "likes to back itself into corners with the world's dumbest ideas and execute them in the absolute smartest ways". A number of reviewers commented on the violence: for instance, Jesse Schedeen of IGN said that it contained "a level of blood and gore" matching the season two episode "Look Who's Purging Now". IndieWire's Steve Greene stated that the episode "reached some new levels of grotesquery" even compared to the violence of Rick's car while protecting Summer in "The Ricks Must Be Crazy".

Jack Shepherd of The Independent wrote that the episode parodies 1980s action films in the storyline with Russian mobsters and their English leader, and Schedeen believed that it parodies "hyper-violent action films" and the John Wick film series. Joe Matar of Den of Geek commented that the episode emulates the action film Die Hard (1988), as Harmon did previously in the Community episode "Modern Warfare". The compound in which Pickle Rick finds himself was the subject of discussion among reviewers. Schedeen referred to it as a "Russian embassy", while Shepherd called it an "unnamed, high-secure facility filled with Russian mobsters", and Greene described it as apparently a "shadowy Eastern European financial consortium". Zack Handlen of The A.V. Club wrote, "I don't think the country of the embassy is ever specifically established, which is part of the joke", though noted that the bodyguards are "European".

A Nerdist article connected the scene where Rick controls the movement of the cockroach by poking its brain with his tongue to a 2015 study "Central-Complex Control of Movement in the Freely Walking Cockroach", published in Current Biology, where researchers were able to stimulate neurons of a cockroach with the aim of controlling its movement.

=== Characterization ===
Critics commented that Summer and Morty were interested in therapy, while Beth and Rick were not. Jaffe wrote that Beth's children "seem much more affected" by the therapist's concerns than Beth and Rick. Matar agreed, stating that "Morty and Summer both hope they'll get to go back to therapy, but Beth and Rick have chosen to act above it all". Zach Blumenfeld of Paste wrote about the car scene that "the eyes of Morty and Summer [lock] into a thousand-yard stare as their mom and grandpa totally ignore the kids' needs". He believed that discussion between Beth and Rick shows "more clearly than ever" their "seemingly hereditary penchant for self-destructive narcissism" and noted that Jerry's "wet-blanket but well-meaning personality" had a "stabilizing effect" on Beth and the family.

Reviewers also analyzed Beth's relationship with her father. Jess Joho of Mashable opined that Beth has a father or Electra complex, saying that the episode "takes Freudian symbolism [...] into the literal" and the choice of a pickle is a "literal phallic symbol". Jaffe stated that Beth "doesn't want to believe" that Rick is choosing to skip therapy as it is "so important to her". Shepherd found that "Beth has unresolved abandonment issues, and that mental agony is causing her some serious inner stress that comes out in snarky attacks on everyone around her".

Shepherd opined that Rick shows he "cares for the family" by turning up to therapy. Handlen wrote that Rick's choice to live with the Smith family implies "he does recognize a basic need for those relationships", and that he avoids therapy because "he's smart enough to know that Dr. Wong [...] is right". Schedeen said that Dr. Wong's speech "really cut to the core of his selfish, narcissistic behavior", giving Rick "one of his rare moments of clarity". However, he believed that Beth will forgive anything he does so long as he continues being a father figure. Joho argued that in his diatribe against therapy, "Rick finally shows his true colors to everyone in the room". He called Dr. Wong's speech a "succinct [takedown] of toxic masculinity".

== Reception ==
The episode's premiere on Adult Swim was watched by 2.31 million viewers. Several critics commented on the fan enthusiasm, such as Blumenfeld, who said it was "arguably the most eagerly anticipated Rick and Morty episode ever" due to the large amount of teaser content released. In June 2017, Julia Alexander of Polygon argued that "Pickle Rick is already everyone's favorite character from Rick and Morty's third season", citing fan actions such as creating Twitter and Tumblr accounts for the character. Alexander commented that the show has "found a dedicated fan base because of the absurdity it bases its comedy in". In 2021, a United States Air Force aircraft used a call sign in reference to the episode.

The episode was critically acclaimed, receiving ratings of five out of five in Vulture, 4.5 out of five in Den of Geek, 8.7 out of 10 in IGN, and 8.2 out of 10 in Paste. Milan Agrawal of Frame by Frame called the episode "twenty minutes of absurd, ultra-violent chaos that still manages to serve the story". The A.V. Club rated it an A and IndieWire gave it a B+. Schedeen praised it as the show at "its most entertaining" and Greene praised it as "one of the series' best examples of untethering Rick Sanchez from all laws of nature and physics and marveling at the results". Jaffe described it as a "Freudian acid trip" that is "surreal and self-aware". Matar found it "super-engaging", lauding the "charmingly stupid concept that develops into an absurdly overblown, kinetic action movie plot".

The animation of Pickle Rick and his storyline received acclaim. Matar believed that the animation was "easily the coolest aspect" of the episode. Shepherd found a pickle to be "the ideal food that's both hilarious and very, very Rick". Scott Russell of Paste reviewed that the "batshit fight scenes" were the best part of the episode, with Blumenfeld also enjoying the "beautiful, free-flowing sequences of mass murder". Xavier Hume-Ashman commented that the episode "carries a creative aura, blending its outrageous premise with sharp storytelling." Handlen praised the pacing, saying that the episode "doesn't belabor the point". Greene highlighted the attention to detail, such as the "sound design of Pickle Rick's mustard salve soothing his laser burns", which gave "a strange amount of credence to a crazy premise".

Danny Trejo received praise in his role as Jaguar. Blumenfeld said that he "shines" in the role and Schedeen wrote that the episode "made great use" of him. Shepherd called him a highlight of the episode, particularly in his dialogue: "This ends when one of us dies, and I've never died before". However, Blumenfeld said that the program is better when characters describe their feelings in "short bursts", and criticized Rick's speech to Jaguar as something the show would earlier have "mercilessly mocked".

The therapy storyline also garnered praise, with Russell calling it perhaps the "strongest B-plot" of the season. Handlen praised the jokes involving Dr. Wong working with coprophagia addicts. Blumenfeld approved of the "strong emotional punch" of the ending and Matar enjoyed the slow pace of the ending scenes, as "a nice breather after all the madcap nonsense that came before". Schedeen praised Sarandon for making "a strong impression as the surprisingly perceptive Dr. Wong". Greene said that a "certain thread of magic" is removed from separating Rick from Morty, but that the episode's "genre riffing and intense commitment to detail nearly make up for it".

=== Accolades ===
In September 2018, Rick and Morty received its first Emmy, with a Primetime Emmy Award for Outstanding Animated Program for "Pickle Rick". The episode also won an Annie Award and was nominated for a Golden Reel Award.

Awards and nominations received by "Pickle Rick"
Year	Award	Category	Recipients	Result	Ref.
2018	Annie Awards	Best General Audience Animated Television/Broadcast Production	"Pickle Rick"	Won	
2018	Golden Reel Awards	Outstanding Achievement in Sound Editing – Animation Short Form	Hunter Curra, Kailand Reily, Andrew Twite, Joy Elett, Jeff Halbert and Konrad Pinon	Nominated	
2018	Primetime Emmy Awards	Outstanding Animated Program	Dan Harmon, Justin Roiland, Delna Bhesania, Barry Ward, Keith Crofford, Mike Lazzo, Ryan Ridley, Dan Guterman, Mike McMahan, Tom Kauffman, Ollie Green, J. Michael Mendel, Jessica Gao, Wes Archer, Anthony Chun and Nathan Litz	Won	
