= The Whirly Dirly Conspiracy =

- Rick and Morty episode
- Episode no.: Season 3 Episode 5
- Directed by: Juan Meza-León
- Written by: Ryan Ridley
- Original air date: August 20, 2017
- Running time: 22 minutes

Guest appearances
- Daniel Benson as Ethan; Clancy Brown as Risotto Groupon; Echo Kellum as Triple Trunks; Tom Kenny as Shnoopy and Gene; Cassie Steele as Tricia Lange

Episode chronology
← Previous "Vindicators 3: The Return of Worldender"	Next → "Rest and Ricklaxation"
- Rick and Morty (season 3)

"The Whirly Dirly Conspiracy" is the fifth episode of the third season of the American science fiction comedy television series Rick and Morty. In the episode, Rick takes Jerry on a mission to an alien resort when the latter feels left out, and Summer accidentally grows to a huge size and inside-out. The episode received positive reviews from critics, who praised the storyline and humor.

== Plot ==
To bolster Jerry's self-esteem, Rick takes him on an adventure at Morty's request, where they visit an otherworldly resort within an immortality field. Jerry encounters Risotto Groupon, an alien who blames Rick for his kingdom being usurped. Risotto enlists Jerry in a plot to kill Rick, but Jerry backs out after Rick apologizes for damaging his marriage. The attempt fails, and Rick realizes Jerry's involvement, sparking a monologue of him accusing Jerry of deliberately acting helpless to guilt others into helping him, such as making Beth feel she was obligated to marry Jerry. They depart the planet, but are ambushed by Risotto, who intends to kill Rick. However, Rick outmaneuvers and kills Risotto instead. When the two return to Earth, Rick softens his attitude towards Jerry, yet refuses to allow him to return to the family.

Meanwhile, Summer struggles with her own self-esteem. Her boyfriend, Ethan, leaves her for a larger-breasted girlfriend, and Summer attempts to enlarge her own breasts using one of Rick's devices. Her efforts are clumsy, and instead grows herself to bizarre proportions. Morty wants to call Rick for assistance, but Beth refuses. Hoping to prove her own self-worth, Beth repeatedly fails to fix the problem and ends up turning Summer inside-out. Beth is then tricked into releasing three tiny technical support workers that were trapped inside the machine when she calls for tech support. Summer disappears to the campsite she and Ethan were supposed to go, still inside out. Beth turns herself inside out and talks to Summer. Once Morty figures out how the machine works, he restores Summer's size and spitefully uses it to deform Ethan in an act of vengeance. In the post-credits scene, the three tiny workers are enjoying their retirement next to a river. As an extremely deformed Ethan walks by, one of them is snatched by an eagle.

== Production ==
The title of the episode, "The Whirly Dirly Conspiracy", was announced on July 25, 2017. On August 7, 2017, Ryan Ridley revealed that he had written the fifth episode, along with the seventh one. Upon the episode's airing, Juan Meza-León was revealed as the director. Screen Rant called the Morty of the episode a "far more capable character, one who has learned so many hard lessons that he's now the one delivering them." Also in the episode, Rick "admits to having some culpability in the dissolution of Jerry and Beth's marriage, while Jerry seemingly comes to terms with his penchant for using pity as a tool to get others to do what he wants" according to Screen Rant.

The episode stars series creator Justin Roiland as both titular characters, Rick Sanchez and Morty Smith, Chris Parnell as Jerry Smith, Spencer Grammer as Summer Smith, and Sarah Chalke as Beth Smith. Ethan, a boy Summer is trying to impress with the size alteration machine, is voiced by Dan Benson in the episode. Benson reprises his role as Ethan from the third episode of the series, "Anatomy Park", as well as the second season of the series. In addition, Clancy Brown appears as the alien Risotto Groupon, an alien plotting against Rick with Jerry's help; Echo Kellum voices Triple Trunks, a bartender at the resort with extra heads sprouting from his eyes and a trunk on each face; Tom Kenny lends his voice as Schnoopy Bloopers and Gene, the Smith's next-door neighbor; and Cassie Steele portrays Tricia Lange.

== Reception ==
Den of Geek compared the episode to the previous one, "Vindicators 3: The Return of Worldender", saying both episode contain "razor-sharp, laugh-out-loud jokes throughout," however the current episode "takes the characters in completely new directions," also complementing the Rick and Jerry storyline ("The plot speeds through the immortality section to introduce a totally new concept"). The A.V. Club criticized the generic characterization in the episode, such as Jerry's cowardice, also calling "The Whirly Dirly Conspiracy" the most "upbeat episode of the season so far." IndieWire praised the episode, saying "It's not as elaborate as the premiere, not as recognizable a template as the Mad Max or Guardians of the Galaxy diversions, nor is it iconic like "Pickle Rick". But with "The Whirly Dirly Conspiracy", Rick and Morty seems to have regained its guiding principles to deliver the best episode of season three so far."

IGN praised the amount of screen time received by Jerry in the episode, saying "the biggest misstep in the otherwise enjoyable Season 3 has been the surprising lack of focus on Jerry. ... [the episode] struck that crucial balance between high-concept sci-fi premise, goofy humor and crushingly authentic character moments."
