= The Wedding Squanchers =

- Rick and Morty episode
- Episode no.: Season 2 Episode 10
- Directed by: Wes Archer
- Written by: Tom Kauffman
- Original air date: October 4, 2015
- Running time: 21 minutes

Guest appearances
- James Callis as Pat Gueterman; Tom Kenny as Squanchy; Tricia Helfer as Donna Gueterman; Arin Hanson as Cyborg Photographer/Three-Eyed Prisoner

Episode chronology
← Previous "Look Who's Purging Now"	Next → "The Rickshank Rickdemption"
- Rick and Morty (season 2)

"The Wedding Squanchers" is the tenth and final episode of the second season of the American animated television sitcom Rick and Morty, and the 21st overall episode of the series. Written by Tom Kauffman and directed by Wes Archer, the episode first aired on Adult Swim in the United States on October 4, 2015.

== Plot ==
After Rick receives and rejects a wedding invitation from Birdperson through an intergalactic parcel delivery, Jerry is accidentally sent with the same service to the wedding destination. In order to retrieve Jerry, Rick is forced to attend his best friend's wedding on the distant planet Squanch, along with the rest of the family, despite his objections. During the reception, Birdperson's bride Tammy Gueterman reveals herself to be an agent of the Galactic Federation. Tammy kills Birdperson and has numerous agents attack the wedding guests. Rick is able to escape with his family safely, but declares that they are unable to return to Earth, as the Federation will be searching for them there. After visiting a planet orbiting an endlessly screaming sun and a planet where all life is "on the cob", the family hides out on a very small planet outside the reach of the Federation.

As Rick leaves to explore the planet, Jerry suggests to the rest of the family that they should return to Earth and turn Rick in, citing Rick's selfishness. However, the rest of the family defends Rick, saying that they want to stay with him due to their unconditional love for him as a family member. Rick hears all this from beneath the floor of their house. After convincing Morty that he is leaving to go buy ice cream, Rick leaves the planet, calls the Federation, and agrees to give himself up in exchange for his family's freedom. The Federation rescues the family and they are returned to Earth, which has now joined the Federation and is bustling with alien tourists. After being told on numerous occasions to get a job, Jerry finally is assigned a job by the Federation upon returning to Earth.

Rick is captured by the Federation and is transported to a prison planet, and under the charges of having committed "everything", Rick is incarcerated seemingly indefinitely.

In a post-credits scene, Mr. Poopybutthole finishes watching the episode and asks the audience what they think will happen in season 3. He overwhelms a pizza deliveryman with the same question, and states that season 3 will come in a year and a half or longer.

== Music ==
The climax of the episode features the song "Hurt" by the American Industrial rock band Nine Inch Nails.

== Reception ==
"The Wedding Squanchers" received critical acclaim from television critics. Zack Handlen, reviewing for the episode for The A.V. Club, wrote that the episode "was hilarious, in addition to being, by the end, pretty goddamn heavy indeed", and called its ending "a brilliant conclusion—one that both presents plenty of story possibilities for the seasons ahead, while still serving as a fitting conclusion to the show’s excellent sophomore year". In a review of the episode, IGN writer Jesse Schedeen wrote that "this show really knows how to hit fans in the feels, and rarely has it succeeded so well in that regard". Joe Matar of Den of Geek gave the episode three out of five stars, calling it "properly tragic" but noting that "I also think the road here could have built to it a lot more meaningfully."

In 2019, Corey Plante of Inverse called the episode a "significant tipping point for the series", referring to the episode's ending as "devastating" and asserting that the episode and the hiatus that followed were partially responsible for the show's growing popularity.
