= Steve Harvey's Funderdome =

American reality TV show

- Created by: Mark Burnett
- Presented by: Steve Harvey
- Country of origin: United States
- Original language: English
- No. of seasons: 1
- No. of episodes: 13

Production
- Executive producers: Mark Burnett; Leslie Garvin; Barry Poznick
- Running time: 45–48 minutes
- Production companies: UAMG Content, LLC; MGM Television

Original release
- Network: ABC
- Release: June 11 – September 24, 2017

Steve Harvey's Funderdome, a portmanteau of funding and Thunderdome, is an American business reality competition show that premiered June 11, 2017 on ABC and produced by MGM Television. In a format similar to Shark Tank, the show features two contestants who pitch products to a studio audience which votes on who will get seed funding for their project.

== Format ==
Each show features three competitions between two inventors (or teams of inventors) competing for the same amount of seed funding—$10,000, $20,000, $50,000, or $100,000. One inventor gives a pitch, followed by a short question-and-answer period with Harvey; the process then repeats for the other inventor. After this, the audience votes on which product they would like to see funded.

Before the winner is revealed, both competitors are offered the opportunity to "cash out." Both inventors (or one chosen member from a team) stand next to a button. A series of amounts—which may increase or decrease—are shown on a screen, along with a timer; to cash out at a particular value, a contestant must hit the button before the timer runs out. Most cash out offers are between 5 and 25 percent of the desired amount (e.g., $5,000–$25,000 for inventors seeking $100,000). In some cases, Harvey has revealed the percentages of the vote before giving the inventors the chance to cash out.

There are three possible outcomes for each competition:

- Neither inventor cashes out: The vote winner gets the full amount, while the loser gets nothing.
- Vote loser cashes out: The vote winner gets the full amount, while the loser gets the cash-out amount instead of nothing.
- Vote winner cashes out: The vote winner gets the cash-out amount, while the loser gets nothing.

== Piracy ==
On June 5, 2017, a message from a believed-to-be cybercriminal stated that eight episodes of this series were already online. A similar group had earlier leaked episodes of Orange Is the New Black. However, ABC had no public comment about the piracy of the show, which was not expected to affect the show's viewership because the target audience was considered unlikely to use piracy websites.

== Episodes ==
No.	Title	Original release date	US viewers (millions)
1	"Episode 103"	June 11, 2017	6.15
Inventions: The Airhook, a stable secure mount for smart phones and tablets that attaches to tray tables on airplanes vs. Soarigami, a device that attaches to any armrest to extend personal space; The V-Smart Bar, a holistic soap that helps keep a woman's private parts fresh and clean vs. Savage Soaps, a line of soaps made from olive oil and other vegan ingredients; Brik Tile, a new version of childhood building bricks vs. Hang-o-Matic, an all-in-one picture-hanging tool.
2	"Episode 106"	June 18, 2017	5.12
Inventions: The Puff-N-Fluff Dog Dryer, a drying system for wet dogs vs. Catzenpup; 'Tri Bow Tie vs Dome Essentials, a natural shave system for bald heads; Cup Cozy Pillow, a convenient cup holder that is also a throw pillow vs. ArmRestor
3	"Episode 101"	June 25, 2017	5.47
Inventions: The BTO Beverage Cooler vs. Swankey Beverage Tote, a cup cozy that holds more than one can; Chaddeze vs. Slick Chicks, a women's undergarment that opens via a side clasp; The Wonderffle Stuffed Waffle Iron vs. Repast Supply Co., a rolling pin that easily makes ravioli.
4	"Episode 104"	July 9, 2017	4.68
Inventions: Nalla, swimsuit pieces that can be used as either a top or a bottom vs. Beauty Batters Botanicals; Trongs, eating utensils for finger foods vs. Chomp!, a plate that converts into a container to store the uneaten portion of kids' meals; PoundPoms-Fit 2 Cheer, weighted pompoms vs. GRITS.
5	"Episode 111"	July 16, 2017	4.43
Inventions: Floozie vs. The Fishing Caddy; Best Shirt Ever vs. Dream Hoodie; Yarnit vs. Dreamcade Replay
6	"Episode 112"	July 23, 2017	4.26
Inventions: The Game Bag vs. Court Grabbers; Frey vs. Bra Tree; High Roller vs. BeanBagglz
7	"Episode 102"	July 30, 2017	3.96
Inventions: The Giant Pocket Shirt vs. The Bev Tie; The Speech Ring vs. The Yummy Mitt; The Popcorn Ball vs. Butter Boss
8	"Episode 108"	August 6, 2017	4.26
Inventions: Pet Pita vs. X-Purr; Weave Dryer vs. Restroom Kit; Imperfect Produce vs. Lalabu
9	"Episode 105"	August 13, 2017	3.89
Inventions: The Ultimate Tailgator Cooler vs. QB54; ZeroSweat vs. Hooded Infinity Sport Towel; Pink Rubber Tires vs. The Unique Seat
10	"Episode 113"	August 20, 2017	4.23
Inventions: Food Cubby vs. BuddyBagz; Staballiizer vs. BuildingBlock; StinkBoss vs. Grand PooBox
11	"Episode 110"	August 27, 2017	3.97
Inventions: Hose Hooker vs. Hair Blinger; BasketMate vs. Klean Collar; Fun Eating Devices vs. Right Shears
12	"Episode 109"	September 17, 2017	2.98
Inventions: Grilled Cheesus vs. Flaky Bakes; Monster Towel vs. Epic Wipes; Kritter Kondo vs. Switcheels
13	"Episode 107"	September 24, 2017	3.89
Inventions: Candwich vs. Tillow; Enjoy-a-Bowl vs. Fedwell Pet Foods; Truxx vs. Studio Stick

== International versions ==
Shortly before the show's debut, MGM Worldwide Television Distribution announced that TF1 acquired the rights to the French version of the show.
