= Mad Max in popular culture =

Impact of the movie series

The Mad Max series of films, which debuted in 1979, has had a significant impact on modern popular culture. Mad Max references are deeply embedded in popular culture; references to its dystopian, apocalyptic, and post-apocalyptic themes and bizarre landscape and desolate wasteland imagery have inspired some artists to emulate the look and feel of some aspect of the series in their work.

== Franchise as a whole ==
- Pop singer Kesha noted that the vibe of her Get $leazy Tour (2011) was "very heavily influenced" by the Mad Max series. Several of the costumes she and her friends wear throughout the show are very reminiscent of characters throughout the Mad Max franchise.
- The Fallout series of video games, which has a post-apocalyptic world as their setting, lists Mad Max as one of its influences.
- The 1985 John Hughes teen comedy Weird Science features a scene where a bunch of mutant bikers smeared in face paint and dressed as Mad Max road warriors crash a party that the two main leads, Wyatt and Gary are hosting.
- Other video games inspired by Mad Max or its sequels include Twisted Metal, Carmageddon, Borderlands, Rage, Overwatch and Fuel.
- Author of the Metro book and video game series, Dmitry Glukhovsky, credited Mad Max as an influence.

== Mad Max ==
- Manga author Buronson stated the setting of his manga and anime series Fist of the North Star was "heavily influenced by the film Mad Max."
- James Wan and Leigh Whannell credit the film's final scene, in which Max handcuffs Johnny's ankle to an overturned car and gives him a hacksaw to cut off either the handcuffs or his own foot to escape imminent death, for inspiring the entire Saw series.
- The music video for the 2001 single "Addicted to Bass" by Puretone was heavily inspired by the opening chase sequence in Mad Max featuring a Pursuit Special. Two Falcon XB coupes were used in the video - one painted in the livery of the MFP vehicles seen in the film.

== Mad Max 2 ==
- Filmmakers Guillermo del Toro, David Fincher, Robert Rodriguez, and Zack Snyder, and video game director Hideo Kojima have cited Mad Max 2 as one of their favorite movies.
- Akira Toriyama's 1982 manga Mad Matic was inspired by Mad Max 2.
- Jamie Hewlett and Alan Martin, creators of the comic heroine Tank Girl, describe her as "Mad Max designed by Vivienne Westwood".
- Waterworld co-writer David Twohy cited Mad Max 2 as a major influence on the film. Both films share the same cinematographer, Dean Semler.
- The music video for Hunters & Collectors' 1982 single "Talking to a Stranger" has a post-apocalyptic aesthetic that the video's director, Richard Lowenstein, compared to Mad Max 2.
- The music video for Phil Collins' "Don't Lose My Number" features a sequence inspired by Mad Max 2.
- The animated series ReBoot features an episode titled "Bad Bob", which is heavily influenced by this film. One of the artists who worked on the episode was Brendan McCarthy, who would later go on to serve as co-writer and concept artist on Mad Max: Fury Road.
- Blackie Lawless from W.A.S.P. cited the film as having a huge effect on the visual theme they were to employ in their 1980s stage shows.
- Mortal Engines author Philip Reeve stated that the film was an influence on the creation of his particular post-apocalyptic universe.
- The music video for "Na Na Na (Na Na Na Na Na Na Na Na Na)" by My Chemical Romance is heavily inspired by Mad Max.

== Mad Max Beyond Thunderdome ==
- The term "Thunderdome" was adapted by popular culture and appears in various contexts with a meaning similar to that used in the film.
- A 2015 television advertisement for NBC's The Voice parodied the "Thunderdome" concept.
- The 1996 music video for 2Pac's "California Love" includes elements inspired by the Mad Max film, such as car chases in the desert and the Thunderdome itself, according to director Hype Williams.
- World Championship Wrestling held a "Spin the Wheel, Make the Deal" match at their Halloween Havoc 1992 pay-per-view event between Sting and Jake "The Snake" Roberts that was based on the film. The match was promoted with a segment where Sting and Roberts met in a tavern full of tough customers that resembled Bartertown. The stipulation of their match would be determined by spinning a wheel, similar to the scene in which Max's punishment is determined by a wheel. The bar patrons repeatedly chant "Spin the Wheel, Make the Deal" like in the film.
- The film is parodied in the Rick and Morty episode "Rickmancing the Stone" alongside Mad Max: Fury Road.

The Master–Blaster character concept has been compared to similar paired characters in video games & trading card games, such as Ferra/Torr from Mortal Kombat X, Borth/Major from the Chaotic and the combination of Gilius Thunderhead and the giant Goah in Golden Axe: The Revenge of Death Adder.

== Mad Max: Fury Road ==
- The film is parodied in the Rick and Morty episode "Rickmancing the Stone", alongside Beyond Thunderdome.
- Director Christopher Nolan acknowledged the influence of Fury Road on his 2017 war film Dunkirk.
- In Moana, the Kakamora's appearance and behavior are heavily based on the War Boys of Fury Road, confirmed by both John Musker and Ron Clements. Mark Mancina, the film's composer, furthers this reference during the Kakamora's theme music by directly quoting several measures of "Brothers in Arms" from the Fury Road score.
