= A Rickle in Time =

- Rick and Morty episode
- Two separate realities intersect when Rick shoots a gun into each.
- Episode no.: Season 2 Episode 1
- Directed by: Wes Archer
- Written by: Matt Roller
- Production code: 201
- Original air date: July 26, 2015
- Running time: 22 minutes

Guest appearances
- Keegan-Michael Key as Testicle Monster #1; Jordan Peele as Testicle Monster #2

Episode chronology
← Previous "Ricksy Business"	Next → "Mortynight Run"
- Rick and Morty (season 2)

"A Rickle in Time" is the first episode in the second season of the American animated television sitcom Rick and Morty, and the twelfth overall episode of the series. Written by Matt Roller and directed by Wes Archer, the episode first aired on Adult Swim in the United States on July 26, 2015. The title of the episode is a pun to the novel, A Wrinkle in Time.

In the episode, Rick, Morty, and his sister Summer—having restarted time after freezing it in the season one finale "Ricksy Business"—are in a quantum-uncertain state of existence. An argument leads to the creation of two alternate timelines, which need to be stitched back together fast if they are to escape quantum collapse. The episode's complex main story was the result of multiple revisions, both in the writing and animation stage. Many scenes were so visually dense the show's animation software could not render them.

"A Rickle in Time" received critical acclaim for its humor and elaborate storyline. Though it was leaked online preceding its official premiere, it was tied as the most-watched cable program the night it first aired.

== Plot ==
Six months after "Ricksy Business", Rick decides to unfreeze time. He warns Morty and Summer that their chronological time could initially be unstable. Rick encourages Beth and Jerry to go out for ice cream to allow them time to stabilize. Morty and Summer argue, and the resulting uncertainty tears time apart into two realities—depicted visually as two mostly synchronized parallel realities. They are no longer a part of any timeline, and the garage is surrounded by a black void filled with Schrödinger's cats. Rick uses a Time Crystal to try to mend the timelines together, but Morty and Summer's continued uncertainty prevents the fusion from working. Rick's own uncertainty that his other self is conspiring against him results in chaos, splitting the realities into four.

A four-dimensional being with a testicle for a head appears and scolds Rick. He gives Rick, Morty and Summer time-stabilizing collars that restore order by fusing the timelines into a single one. However, since Rick obtained the time crystal by illegal means, the being tells them that they will go to Time Prison for eternity. Rick instructs Morty and Summer to break off their collars, but the resulting chain of uncertainty further splits their realities into dozens of different realities. After defeating the testicle monster, Rick notes that time is falling apart. Summer's collar transports her back to her time, but one of the Mortys' collars is broken. With the garage falling away piece by piece, the Morty with the broken collar falls into the spaceless void and Rick jumps after him, but Morty dropped his collar, so Rick gives Morty his collar and accepts death but quickly changes his mind as he spots Morty's collar floating below him. He hurriedly fixes it, and all three are reunited in their own time.

Meanwhile, after getting ice cream, Beth and Jerry hit a deer with their car. As an animal surgeon, Beth attempts to help the deer at a veterinary hospital, but notices a gunshot wound in its side. A hunter appears and claims the deer as his, calling a lawyer to guarantee his ownership. While Beth ignores this and attempts to save the deer, Jerry comes to the rescue by bringing members of a wildlife institute who can transport the deer to the best doctors, and outside the jurisdiction of the hunter's claim. Back in the woods, Jerry reveals the men were not doctors, but rather employees at the ice cream parlor. Beth continues her operation and saves the deer, who returns to the woods.

After the credits, an additional scene shows the testicle monster receiving reinforcements. They mistake Albert Einstein for Rick and proceed to beat him up and warn him not to "mess with time". This inspires Einstein to formulate the theory of relativity to spite them.

== Production ==
=== Writing ===
Co-creator Justin Roiland was adamant that episode one of season two pick up where its predecessor left off; co-creator Dan Harmon also remembered he toyed around with the idea of freezing time for the entire length of the season. There was talk of the frozen-time conceit being just a joke for a cold open, but the writers decided to expand it to the entire episode, with Roiland saying, "Okay, let’s try to actually do that and try to tell a whole story that shows why time is sort of problematic." It was difficult because instead of parodying/subverting a trope—a common path for many episodes—the writers essentially had to invent their own rules for fractured time.

An early incarnation involved Morty and Summer going about frozen time when they are confronted by a time policeman—which evolved into the time-traveling testicle monsters. These characters were originally inspired by Stephen King's miniseries The Langoliers. This version was cut because they deemed it too "basic" with nowhere to go for a potential second act. One deleted element of the splitting time was referring to it as a "time quake"; an early version featured Rick berating Morty for wearing "shorty shorts", which caused time to split. The reason for the fractured time was ultimately re-developed into something more specific to the characters. At first, chaos as a whole was responsible for the split time, but they decided on uncertainty as a cause solely to serve a joke about flathead/Phillips head screwdrivers. "When you're talking about how to define chaos, let alone uncertainty, that's [when] you get into a semantic spiral," producer Ryan Ridley said. Harmon felt it a suitable source for the time split because uncertainty was "an intersection between quantum physics and [the] human condition." The team was happy when they created the joke that Rick believes his parallel self is plotting to kill him, because it "felt like [we] were writing a cartoon."

The earliest incarnation of the B-story involved Rick taking Beth and Jerry and placing them amongst a sea of random individuals on an island or parking garage to occupy them; Harmon characterized it as an "homage to event programming," such as Lost. It was re-developed because they felt such series "fizzle out" or end unresolved, which would not help the episode comedically. Another version fused the episode's B-story more prominently with its A-story in that when a "time quake" would occur, Beth and Jerry would unknowingly experience repeated moments, and their settings would change between the past, present, and future. In the end, the A-story was so complex already that they chose to create an independent narrative for the B-story. To this end, Roiland felt that the writers "probably could have done a little better" on that half of the show.

=== Animation ===
Roiland characterized the episode as "brutal to [story]board and animate." Director Wes Archer, his brother Martin Archer and Scott Alberts storyboarded multiple different versions of the episode. Archer estimated its opening was re-developed "three or four times." Their first thumbnail pass took two weeks, with the first full animatic taking an additional three weeks. At this point, the team realized the episode was not working. Harmon wrote another draft and the writing team stayed up all night pitching jokes for it. It was then sent off to Archer and his team for another animatic. "They were able to reuse a lot, but they had to go in and re-board a bunch of stuff and they were troopers the whole way through. Never once did they complain," said Roiland. This alternate version, labeled "Attempt #1", was released on the season two Blu-ray and DVD sets.

The show is animated in the software Toon Boom Harmony, which kept crashing constantly during the episode's production. This was due in large part to the shots where, ultimately, 64 separate realities play out onscreen. The overload of layers and elements would cause the software to crash. The final episode was the result of multiple composited shots, stitched together: "They basically had to output it and then rotoscope over the top of it in order to get the final fixes in," Roiland said. There are subtle differences in several but not all duplicated shots. When the in-house animation unit for Rick and Morty would receive shots back from their international partner, Bardel Entertainment, they would attempt to edit shots further for more variety. To finalize single shots, a computer would have to be out of service for nearly fourteen hours to complete rendering. In one instance, a layer went missing nearing the end of a shot, necessitating another full composite.

At the time of its post-production, Harmon was working on the sixth season of Community and Roiland was "really wishing he was here for [this] particular episode." The episode's troubled production put the entire season behind schedule.

== Reception ==
"A Rickle in Time", alongside the second episode of the second season, "Mortynight Run", leaked online one month before its television premiere. Roiland noted that it was ripped from a press-only site, with subtle audio and animation errors that would be fixed in the final version. On the ethics of watching the leaked episodes, Roiland commented, "I will say this: I don't think that any fans — or even non-fans — that end up watching it are villainous. [...] I don't think anyone should beat themselves up too bad for doing it, but it's more of a bummer that someone else made the decision to put it out into the world before it was ready." Upon its premiere on television, the episode received a 1.1 rating and was watched by a total of 2.12 million people, making it tied as the most watched show on cable that night.

"A Rickle in Time" received critical acclaim from television critics. Zack Handlen, reviewing for the episode for The A.V. Club, praised its "incredibly clever (and visually stunning) central gimmick," writing that the episode enhances what he finds is the show's "genius: it finds time for absurdity and sincerity, with both enhancing, rather than undermining, the other." IGN writer Jesse Schedeen dubbed the episode "truly memorable," summarizing it thusly: "[It] reminded us why this show is so unique. The time-splitting conflict was cleverly executed and grew progressively more hilarious. Not only that, it wrapped up on a surprisingly poignant note." Gita Jackson of Paste gave the episode at 9.0/10, commenting, "There's thought here, there's polish, they want to make sure you can see the work put into this."

Roiland and Harmon were convinced the episode was a mess. "It went off the deep end conceptually and got really over-complicated," said Harmon. "It broke us to a certain extent. We were so close to something amazing and we never really got there from a structural standpoint," Roiland said.
