= The Rickshank Rickdemption =

- Rick and Morty episode
- Episode no.: Season 3 Episode 1
- Directed by: Juan Meza-Leon
- Written by: Mike McMahan
- Original air date: April 1, 2017
- Running time: 23 minutes

Guest appearances
- Nathan Fillion as Cornvelious Daniel; Tom Kenny

Episode chronology
← Previous "The Wedding Squanchers"	Next → "Rickmancing the Stone"
- Rick and Morty season 3

"The Rickshank Rickdemption" is the first episode in the third season of the American animated television sitcom Rick and Morty, and the twenty-second episode overall in the series. It was written by Mike McMahan and directed by Juan Meza-Leon. The season three premiere first aired unannounced on Adult Swim in the United States on April 1, 2017 when it was watched by 676,000 American households in its initial airing. On the first day of its original broadcast, "The Rickshank Rickdemption" was replayed every half hour from 8pm to 12am ET with improved ratings, as a part of Adult Swim's annual April Fools' Day joke.

The episode follows the events surrounding Rick Sanchez's incarceration at the Galactic Federation's prison and high-stakes bid to escape, with revelations that both reveal his true motives and character. Following its initial airing, "The Rickshank Rickdemption" received positive reviews, which generally favored the episode's character development and its surprise turn of events.

== Plot ==
During Rick Sanchez's incarceration, the Galactic Federation has colonized Earth and the Smith family attempts to cope with his absence. Summer exhumes the remains of her reality's Rick in their backyard, intending to use his portal gun and rescue him. Morty, however, attempts to reveal Rick's shortcomings to Summer by taking her to his own original dimension — now a universe where Earth has been transformed into a wasteland by a virus turning all humans to hideous monsters as a consequence of Rick's carelessness (referred to as "the Cronenberg World").

All the while, Galactic Federation scientists attempt to discover the secret to Rick's portal gun by sending alien Cornvelious Daniel into his mind to interrogate him by having Rick show them his memories. In his memories, Rick has trouble inventing teleportation, but after an alternate version of himself shows him multiversal travel, Rick declines and decides to give up science. The alternate Rick drops a bomb that kills Rick's wife Diane and a young Beth, driving Rick to invent his own multiversal portal gun.

Morty and Summer are captured by the Smith family of the Cronenberg World, but are saved by the Citadel Militia, who send the two to the Council of Ricks. Upon learning that Rick was captured, Seal Team Ricks announce their plan to dispatch a team to assassinate him. At the prison, Rick deceives the Galactic Federation into believing he divulged the secrets of his portal gun, claiming he fabricated his backstory. (Note: The season 5 finale "Rickmurai Jack" reveals that the memory Rick shows is actually real, contrary to Rick's claim that it was fabricated.) With their guard lowered, Rick hacks into Federation technology to switch bodies with Cornvelious, who is shot by SEAL Team Ricks.

Rick transfers his consciousness into one of the SEAL Team Ricks and kills the others. He infiltrates the Citadel of Ricks, and manages to teleport the station into the same space as the Federation prison. This propels both sides into a massive battle; Rick then uses the ensuing chaos to rescue Morty and Summer and kill the Council of Ricks. In the confusion, Rick enters the Federation mainframe — revealed to be his reason for turning himself in. He uses this access to make the Galactic Federation's single currency worthless, thereby destroying the Federation's economy. The Federation falls into chaos and collapses as a result, with the aliens leaving Earth.

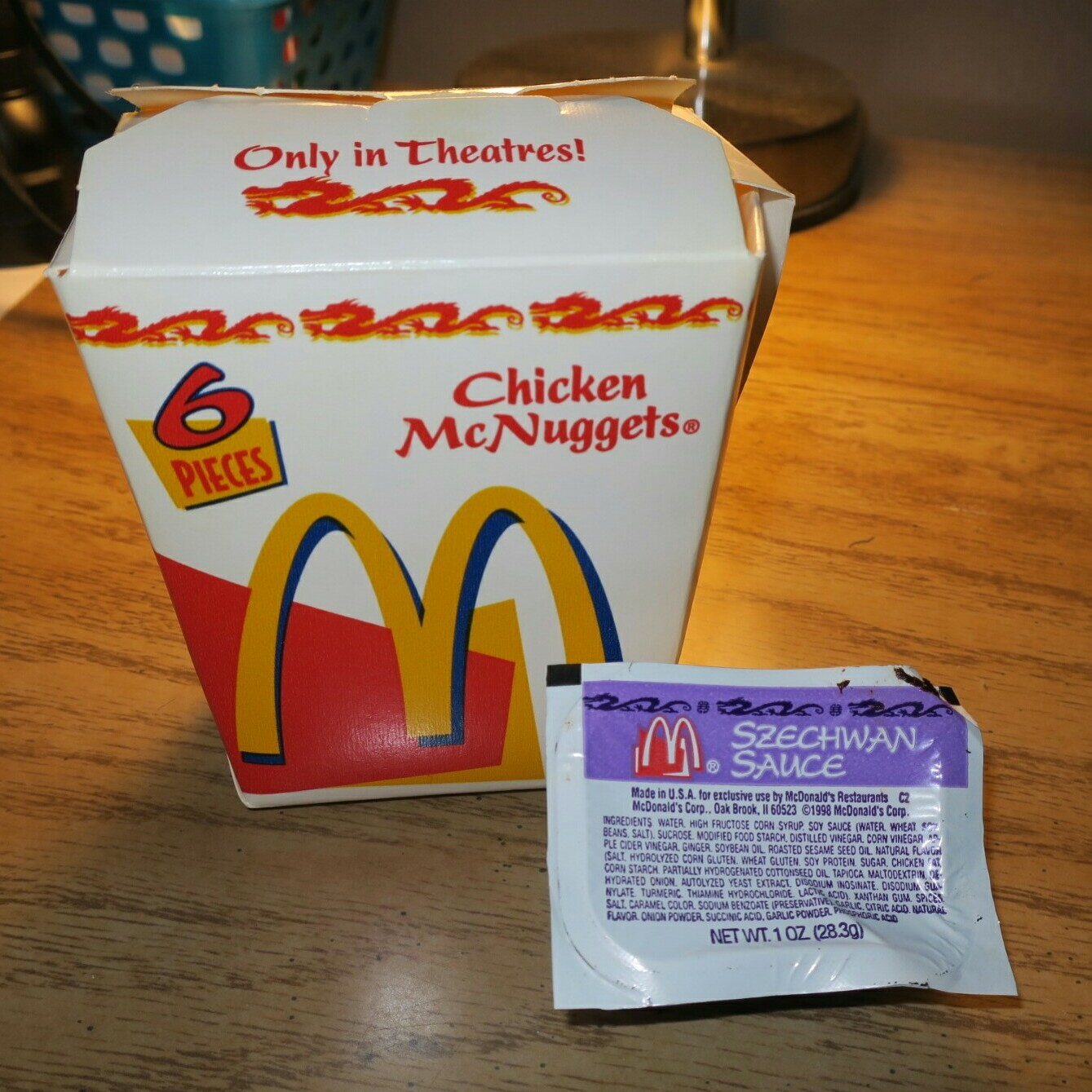
McDonald's chicken nuggets and original szechuan sauce from 1998.

Heralded a hero by Summer and Beth, Rick returns to the Smith household where Jerry issues Beth to choose him or Rick; Beth chooses Rick. As Morty copes with his parents' divorce, Rick reveals to Morty that his ulterior motive was to make both the Galactic Federation and Jerry "go away", punishing Jerry for his betrayal by threatening to turn him in to the government in the second-season finale and ensuring his role as Morty's de facto male influence. This devolves into Rick going on a monologue, in homage to his rant at the conclusion of the pilot episode, about how their adventures are bound to be darker than before. Rick also professes his passion for the Szechuan Sauce once available at McDonald's as a promotional item for the 1998 film Mulan, much to Morty's confusion. (Note: Following the airing of this episode, Rick and Morty fans began a campaign asking for McDonald's to bring the sauce back on the menu, resulting in a limited offering of the sauce in select McDonald's stores in October 2017, followed by a wider release in February 2018.)

In the post-credits scene, Tammy observes Birdperson's resurrection as a cyborg dubbed "Phoenix Person".

== Production ==
"The Rickshank Rickdemption" was directed by Juan Meza-León and written by staff team member Mike McMahan. Elements of the episode were loosely inspired by the film The Shawshank Redemption and features the series' trademark dark humor, nihilism, and multiverse-based plot line. In a segment for the Den of Geek website, series creator Dan Harmon said "The Rickshank Rickdemption" would resolve the conflicts that originated from the second season. According to Harmon: "I don't think anybody wants to do a third season that simply spends a whole bunch of episodes dealing with a situation that we created at the end of the second season, so I think that's a non-spoiler way of saying things should be okay pretty quickly". The episode marks the reappearance of several former key plot developments, including the Cronenberg universe, the Citadel of Ricks, and Birdperson.

The third-season premiere of Rick and Morty was expected to arrive as early as 2016. However, Harmon admitted in a conversation with Indiewire that new episodes were becoming more difficult to create because of artistic disagreements with co-creator Justin Roiland. Writing for "The Rickshank Rickdemption" commenced on November 2, 2015; a few months later in February 2016, episode director Juan Meza-Leon began work for the project's sound recording. In February 2017, to celebrate the beginning of the episode's animation phase, Adult Swim Australia released a teaser trailer, later revealed to actually be a "RickRoll": a compilation of clips taken from seasons one and two that offered no new insight into the upcoming premiere.

== Release and reception ==
"The Rickshank Rickdemption" premiered on April 1, 2017, without any prior announcement at 8pm ET on Adult Swim. As a part of Adult Swim's annual April Fools' joke, the premiere was broadcast for four straight hours, interrupting the television network's scheduled new episodes of Samurai Jack and Dragon Ball Super. It was watched by 676,000 American households and had a 0.2 rating in the 18–49 demographic and is the least viewed episode in the whole series. By 11pm, as details of the episode's unexpected debut spread, "The Rickshank Rickdemption" had its best showing with 949,000 viewers and a 0.4 rating.

A critical success, "The Rickshank Rickdemption" was praised as one of the series' best episodes, with Jesse Schedeen of IGN saying it was "keeping the level of quality high". Critics cited the episode's dark undertones and unique insight into Rick's psyche.

IGN's Jesse Schedeen wrote in his review "Justin Roiland and Dan Harmon managed to craft a conflict that was hilarious, darkly poignant and completely unlike anything fans were expecting". He also praised the episode's ability to defy expectations while offering "a grim portrait of a mad scientist who hates everyone else almost as much as he hates himself". Zach Blumenfeld of Paste called "The Rickshank Rickdemption" the "top of all animated television", an episode that saw deeper character development and humor that rivaled "Total Rickall" and "Meeseeks and Destroy". Den of Geek writer Joe Matar observed "previous Rick and Morty plot developments, reminding us of the show’s commitment to its persistent multiverse" in a premiere he considered as the series' best.

== See also ==
- Adult Swim April Fools' Day stunts
