= Mortynight Run =

- Rick and Morty episode
- Episode no.: Season 2 Episode 2
- Directed by: Dominic Polcino
- Written by: David Phillips
- Original air date: August 2, 2015
- Running time: 23 minutes

Guest appearances
- Jemaine Clement as Fart; Andy Daly as Krombopulos Michael

Episode chronology
← Previous "A Rickle in Time"	Next → "Auto Erotic Assimilation"
- Rick and Morty season 2

"Mortynight Run" is the second episode of the second season of the Adult Swim animated television series Rick and Morty. Written by David Phillips and directed by Dominic Polcino, the episode premiered on August 2, 2015, though it was leaked online beforehand. After dropping Jerry at a daycare purpose-built for alternate universe versions of Jerry, Rick sells a gun to the assassin Krombopulos Michael, but Morty decides to save his target—a telepathic gas-based entity. The title of this episode is a reference to the 1988 movie Midnight Run.

The song "Goodbye Moonmen", sung by Jemaine Clement, was later released on The Rick and Morty Soundtrack, while art director James McDermott published some concept art from the episode. Rick picks up rocks that cause a parasite infestation two episodes later, in "Total Rickall", while Morty undergoes character development after choosing to commit murder. On its premiere, an estimated 2.19 million viewers watched the episode, and critics reviewed it positively.

== Plot ==
Rick gives Morty a driving lesson in his flying ship. They discover Jerry in the backseat and take him to a daycare center, Jerryboree, designed by a Rick in an alternate timeline for versions of Jerry to be dropped off at. Jerry feels infantilized by the childish atmosphere, including a ball pit and figure in a Beth costume, but gets excited to watch Midnight Run. He soon discovers a room of Jerrys who have been abandoned by their Rick, and is disgusted by their lack of will to leave. He walks out of the front door but after reaching a ticket station and failing to communicate with the alien, he is scared by the outside planet and returns.

Rick sells an antimatter gun to assassin Krombopulos Michael, but Morty is concerned over the morality of this. They use the money to go to the arcade Blips and Chitz. In the first game, Morty becomes the character Roy and lives his life for 55 years, with no memory of the outside world, until dying after falling off a ladder in a carpet store. While Rick plays Roy, Morty takes the ship with the aim of stopping Krombopulos Michael, but accidentally crashes and kills him. Before a guard can kill Morty, Rick arrives through a portal that slices the guard in two.

Krombopulos Michael's target was a gaseous being that communicates through telepathy, which Rick calls Fart. Morty takes Fart aboard the ship, and Rick protests before leaving angrily. He reappears to save Morty after guards attack. Gearhead fixes the damaged ship while Fart starts singing the song "Goodbye Moonmen", with an accompanying psychedelic music video, in Morty's head. Gearhead betrays Rick by calling the authorities, who Fart says want to use their ability to alter the composition of atoms. Rick, Morty and Fart are chased by law enforcement as they leave until Fart uses telepathy to distract them.

Fart reaches a wormhole and tells Morty that their plan is to destroy all carbon-based life, which they consider to be pathogens. Morty induces Fart to sing again and ultimately kills them with the antimatter gun. Rick and Morty then return to pick up Jerry, but another Rick and Morty are confused over which Jerry corresponds to who, and they each leave with a random one of the two Jerrys. In a post-credits scene, Rick appears in a Blips and Chitz advert.

== Production ==
The episode officially debuted on August 2, 2015, on Adult Swim. However, along with the previous episode "A Rickle in Time", an advanced copy sent to reviewers was leaked online prior to the premiere. This version had inferior audiovisual quality and lacked last-minute animation fixes, although creator Justin Roiland said that "the average person wouldn't really know the difference".

In 2017, art director James McDermott published some concept art for the episode. He said that he made a "wet and steamy" design for the suspicious space garage where Rick meets Krombopulos Michael, and drew an unused character Krootch who was originally intended to be a procurer that tries to trick Jerry when he leaves the daycare. Krootch was discarded after Harmon decided the environment should be more chaotic and scary.

According to Roiland, a collection of rocks that Rick is seen collecting at the end of the episode contain a parasite pod—visible as a pink blob—which goes on to cause the parasite infestation of two episodes later, "Total Rickall". In the latter episode, Rick can be seen disposing of the rocks. A video of Roiland reading some alternate jokes proposed in the writers' room for "Mortynight Run" was released in 2017. In a 2020 video, creator Dan Harmon described how both the main plot and side plot "Mortynight Run" fit into the eight-step "story circle" technique he uses for writing.

"Goodbye Moonmen" is featured on The Rick and Morty Soundtrack (2018). It was composed by Ryan Elder, who was given the lyrics and the description "Fart sings a David Bowie-inspired song"—the final song imitated Bowie's psychedelic imagery and nonsense lyrics. After listening to Bowie for several hours, Elder composed the song using a guitar in a couple of hours. Jemaine Clement, the voice actor for Fart, recorded his dialogue locally in New Zealand with direction from the producers. According to Elder, there was around 20 minutes left in the session for him to record "Goodbye Moonmen", and his first rendition was the version used in the final episode.

The comic Rick and Morty #34 (2018) follows the life of Krombopulos Michael from one of his first assassination jobs to his death.

== Analysis ==
"Mortynight Run" is the first episode to use Morty's name in the title, though previous titles incorporate Rick's name. The arcade Blips and Chitz briefly reoccurs in the season four episode "Never Ricking Morty". Josh Wilbur of Wired said time passing more quickly inside another world—in Roy, 55 years for Morty pass within minutes—is a common trope in science fiction. Other examples include "The Inner Light", a Star Trek: The Next Generation episode in which Captain Picard experiences decades as another person in 25 minutes, and "White Christmas", a Black Mirror instalment where a digital copy of a person is made to experience 1000 years passing per minute.

Paste's Gita Jackson said the moral of the episode is "that we understand so little about the world that we live in", rather than the more negative message "life is inherently pain". This is shown through Fart's justification for destroying all carbon-based life, and Jerry's inability to understand the world he finds when leaving the daycare. The A.V. Club's Zack Handlen said the episode "challenges the obvious notion of Rick as a coldhearted bastard and Morty as a sweet, good-natured kid". This is because the moral decision is not always the obvious one, and Rick understands situations better than characters like Morty. Also, Morty's character growth shows that he could be "designed for change", while Jerry's experience shows that he is not.

Emily Reuben of Looper said the episode contained two discontinuities: the way Rick kills several guards—by flooding the room—should not have been possible due to a hole that Morty created on his initial crash into the room, and the cargo in the back of Rick's ship in the opening scene inexplicably changes.

== Reception ==
The episode was watched by 2.19 million viewers when it first aired on Adult Swim.

Rating it 8.8 out of 10, Jesse Scheeden of IGN believed that the game Roy was a standout and showed the writers' attention to detail. Schedeen approved of Morty's character growth, the "distinctive voice and personality" that Clement brought to Fart and that Jerry's subplot was linked to the main storyline, amusing and had a good resolution. Giving it a score of 9.5 out of 10, Paste's Gita Jackson wrote that the episode was humorous, particularly the density of jokes at Blips and Chitz and Fart's incorrect word choices after reading the other characters' minds. Zack Handlen of The A.V. Club graded the episode A−, despite experiencing an initial disappointment at a lack of surprise on the scale of previous episodes. On reflection, Handlen found it "solid, even necessary storytelling for the series" for its character development of Morty. He also approved of "subtle touches throughout" and Clement's voice acting as Fart, a character "just likable enough for his eventual disintegration to matter".
