= Rick and Morty season 2 =

Rick and Morty
- Season 2
- Blu-ray cover
- Showrunners: Dan Harmon; Justin Roiland
- Starring: Justin Roiland; Chris Parnell; Spencer Grammer; Sarah Chalke
- No. of episodes: 10

Release
- Original network: Adult Swim
- Original release: July 26 – October 4, 2015

Season chronology
- ← Previous; Season 1 Next → Season 3

The second season of the animated television series Rick and Morty originally aired on Cartoon Network's late night programming block Adult Swim in the United States on July 26, 2015, with "A Rickle in Time", and concluded on October 4 with "The Wedding Squanchers". This season aired a total of ten episodes.

== Cast and characters ==
=== Main cast ===
- Justin Roiland as Rick Sanchez C-137 and Morty Smith Prime, the two main characters of the show; Rick is an eccentric mad scientist and Morty is his kind but easily distressed grandson.
- Chris Parnell as Jerry Smith C-131 and Jerry Smith 5126, Rick's son-in-law and Morty's father; a simple-minded and insecure person, who disapproves of Rick's influence over his family.
- Spencer Grammer as Summer Smith C-131, Rick's granddaughter and Morty's sister; a conventional teenager who worries about improving her status among her peers.
- Sarah Chalke as Beth Smith C-131, Rick's daughter and Morty's mother; a generally level-headed person, who is dissatisfied with her marriage.

=== Recurring cast ===
- Kari Wahlgren as:
  - Jessica, Morty's classmate and crush.
  - Rick's Space Cruiser, the sentient artificial intelligence operating the garage and Rick's ship.

=== Guest cast ===
- Keegan-Michael Key as Testicle Monster #1, a being from a fourth dimension.
- Jordan Peele as Testicle Monster #2, a being from a fourth dimension.
- Jemaine Clement as Fart, an imprisoned gaseous being.
- Andy Daly as Krombopulos Michael, an alien assassin.
- Christina Hendricks as Unity, an alien collective hive mind.
- Patton Oswalt as Beta 7, an alien collective hive mind.
- Keith David as Reverse Giraffe, an alien parasite, and as President of the United States.
- Matt Walsh as Sleepy Gary, an alien parasite.
- Kurtwood Smith as General Nathan, a U.S. army general.
- Stephen Colbert as Zeep Xanflorp, the creator of the mini-verse.
- Nathan Fielder as Kyle, the creator of the teeny-verse.
- Alan Tudyk as Chris, the president of Rick's micro-verse.
- Alex Hirsch as Toby Matthews, a high school student.
- Jim Rash as Glaxo Slimslom, an alien marriage counselor.
- Matt Besser as an alien leader.
- Gary Cole as an alien doctor.
- Werner Herzog as an alien in a wheelchair.
- Chelsea Kane as Arthricia, an alien farmer girl.
- James Callis as Pat Gueterman, Tammy's father.
- Tricia Helfer as Donna Gueterman, Tammy's mother.

=== Other cast members ===
Other cast members of the season, who each have voiced one or more characters, include: Jay Johnson, Tom Kenny, Jill Talley, Paul F. Tompkins, Scott Chernoff, Ryan Elder, Will Jennings, Maurice LaMarche, Tress MacNeille, Ryan Ridley, John Kassir, Dawnn Lewis, Nolan North, Rob Paulsen, Gary Anthony Williams, Tony Barbieri, Kevin Michael Richardson, Jevin Smith, Tara Strong, Dan Benson, Dan Harmon, Jess Harnell, Phil Hendrie, William Holmes, Cassie Steele, Mike McCaffery, Brandon Johnson, James Atkinson, Rob Schrab and Arin Hanson.

== Episodes ==
No. overall	No. in season	Title	Directed by	Written by	Original release date	U.S. viewers (millions)
12	1	"A Rickle in Time"	Wes Archer	Matt Roller	July 26, 2015	2.12
Continuing from "Ricksy Business", Rick, Morty and Summer spend six months repairing the house and screwing around with time frozen. After unfreezing it, the trio ends up in a decaying dimension. They split into separate timelines whenever they are uncertain about something. Rick becomes paranoid, thinking that his duplicates want to kill him, but eventually he calms down. A creature in charge of safeguarding time appears and gives them collars that integrate all the timelines, then attempts to arrest them because Rick stole the time-freezing crystal. Rick, Morty, and Summer show uncertainty on purpose and break the collars, splitting into sixty-four timelines, and they simultaneously beat up the same creature. Rick then repairs the collars, and they successfully integrate all the timelines. In one timeline, Rick attempts to sacrifice himself and let Morty live by giving him his collar, but ultimately he survives too. Meanwhile, Beth and Jerry hit a deer, and bring it to an animal hospital. A hunter claims the deer for his own because he shot it before the accident. Beth is able to save the deer's life and release it. Post-credits scene: The creature and his friend beat up Albert Einstein, mistaking him for Rick. They have to tell him that he should not be messing with time, but this leads Einstein to spite them by devising the famous mass–energy equivalence equation, E=mc^{2}.
13	2	"Mortynight Run"	Dominic Polcino	David Phillips	August 2, 2015	2.19
Rick takes Morty on a trip to teach him how to pilot the flying car. When Rick realizes that Jerry has followed them without being noticed in the back seat, he leaves him in a daycare specifically designed for Jerries from alternate realities. Jerry socializes with other Jerries, some of them left there indefinitely because their Rick and Morty never returned. Rick sells an antimatter gun to Krombopulos Michael, an alien assassin who intends to use it to eliminate a gaseous being whom Rick nicknames Fart that is held captive by alien authorities. Rick plans to spend the day at the "Blips & Chitz" video arcade, but Morty decides to stop the assassin. After Rick and Morty release Fart, they are chased by the authorities. Fart uses telepathic powers to kill the authorities, which also leads to civilian casualties. Later, Morty learns that Fart wants to eliminate all carbon-based life forms. Morty then kills Fart using Krombopulous Michael's antimatter gun. Rick and Morty return to pick up their Jerry, but it is left unclear whether they got the right one. (Note: The season 6 premiere "Solaricks" reveals that they did in fact pick up the wrong Jerry.) Post-credits scene: A promotional ad for "Blips & Chitz" with Rick making an appearance.
14	3	"Auto Erotic Assimilation"	Bryan Newton	Ryan Ridley	August 9, 2015	1.94
Rick attempts to loot a damaged spaceship with Morty and Summer. They find Unity, a hive mind and Rick's ex-lover. It plans to eventually assimilate the whole universe. Beta 7 is a male hive mind who has a crush on Unity, which it rejects. In a planet completely assimilated by Unity, it and Rick have parties, have sex, and drink and use drugs together. In light of all the revelry, it loses control and the planet is left messy and untended. Summer finds the assimilation unethical, until she and Morty witness some inhabitants regain their identities and start a race war. Eventually, Unity decides to leave Rick for its own good. Meanwhile, Beth and Jerry find a secret underground room with a slug-like monster. The couple has an argument where Jerry makes accusations against Rick and Beth tries to defend her father. The monster breaks free of its chains and accuses Beth and Jerry of having the worst relationship it has ever seen. An upset Beth confronts a visibly distressed Rick, who attempts suicide in the garage but fails. Post-credits scene: A drunken Rick attempts to contact Unity only to be blocked by Beta 7.
15	4	"Total Rickall"	Juan Meza-León	Mike McMahan	August 16, 2015	1.96
Alien parasites plant fake memories in the minds of the Smith family and pretend they are friends and family members. Every time the family reminisces about the past, the aliens reproduce. The family can't distinguish real people from aliens, so eventually they can't even trust each other. To prevent further spread, Rick locks down the house. At first, the only alien present is the fake "Uncle Steve"; they are soon joined by other aliens including Cousin Nicky, Sleepy Gary (who poses as Beth's husband and Jerry's lover), the family butler Mr. Beauregard, Frankenstein's Monster, a talking pencil named Pencilvester, Tinkles the Fairy Lamb, etc. Mr. Poopybutthole is an unusual yellow creature who did not appear in any previous episode but appears to be a longtime friend. Eventually, Morty discovers that the parasites can only create positive memories, allowing the Smith family to confirm one another's existence and kill all the aliens. As they sit down to dinner, Beth shoots Mr. Poopybutthole, thinking he is a parasite as well, but he turns out to be real. Post-credits scene: Mr. Poopybutthole goes through physical therapy, and refuses to see the Smith family. Beth is devastated. Note: An alternate version of this episode, titled "Rick and Morty Babies," premiered on Adult Swim as part of its 2021 April Fools' Day prank. This version featured all of the characters dubbed over to sound like children and changed some of the profanity to more "kid-friendly" alternatives.
16	5	"Get Schwifty"	Wes Archer	Tom Kauffman	August 23, 2015	2.12
A massive alien head (a "Cromulon") appears over Earth, demanding to hear an original song, so Rick and Morty improvise "Get Schwifty". The whole planet is abducted and forced to participate in a musical talent show, where the losers' planets are obliterated via plasma ray. Morty steals Rick's portal gun and leaves him alone with Ice-T—the only musician to survive an earthquake that struck the Grammy Awards—to make a hit original song and save earth. Morty stumbles across Birdperson (living with Tammy since "Ricksy Business"), who persuades him to go back to Rick. Ice-T is revealed to be an ice alien who does not initially care about Earth, but he later changes his mind and saves the planet. Rick, Morty, and the US president win the competition by improvising "Head Bent Over". Meanwhile, Jerry, Beth, and Summer enter a religious cult based on an incorrect interpretation of the message from Cromulons. The movement quickly disbands after realizing it was all a musical talent show. Post-credits scene: Back at Alphabetrium, Ice-T's home planet, his father rewards Ice-T by lifting his exile and restoring his true form, "Water-T". The Numbericons attack and Water-T rushes out to battle. This is an action movie promo.
17	6	"The Ricks Must Be Crazy"	Dominic Polcino	Dan Guterman	August 30, 2015	1.91
Rick's flying car will not start, so he and Morty investigate the problem. The car's battery contains a miniature universe and Rick has been threatening their destruction if they do not generate electricity. Inside it, Zeep Xanflorp, that universe's top scientist, created a second miniature universe for the same purpose. Rick, Morty and Zeep are left stranded in a third miniature universe, as the pilot commits suicide and destroys his ship. Rick and Zeep constantly fight, and Morty abandons them and becomes a native chief. Morty forces the two scientists to work together to escape. While escaping, Rick reveals that Morty can turn into a car if needed. Ultimately, Rick and Morty leave the battery, trapping Zeep. Zeep is forced to discontinue his miniature universe research and have his people resume generating electricity to prevent Rick from destroying their universe. Meanwhile, Summer is forced to stay in the flying car, which uses violence to "keep Summer safe" from strangers, while she protests. However, it is effectively pardoned once it prepares a peace treaty, ending the human-spider war that has existed in this alternate reality. As a result, ice cream is now served with flies to appeal to spiders. Post-credits scene: Morty suddenly turns into a car in his class.
18	7	"Big Trouble in Little Sanchez"	Bryan Newton	Alex Rubens	September 13, 2015	1.97
Rick becomes "Tiny Rick" by transferring his mind to a teenage clone of himself in order to kill a vampire in Morty and Summer's school. Tiny Rick is outgoing and popular, but subconsciously cries for help in song lyrics and drawings. Much to the disdain of her classmates, Summer deliberately gets him expelled by denouncing him as the killer of the vampire Coach Feratu (a reference to Nosferatu). Morty and Summer eventually persuade Rick to return to his body. Meanwhile, Jerry and Beth experience couple therapy on an alien planet. Two manifestations of the partners' perceptions of one another are created: Jerry's Beth is embodied as a towering, hostile Xenomorph-like insectoid, and Beth's Jerry is a servile worm. The insectoid Beth goes on a rampage with the help of the worm Jerry, killing several couples and employees. Eventually, Jerry acts in a brave way, causing Beth to envision a strong Jerry, which in turn envisions a goddess-like Beth, who destroys the insectoid monster. Post-credits scene: The lead vampire complains about the use of names like "Coach Feratu" that give away their vampire status.
19	8	"Interdimensional Cable 2: Tempting Fate"	Juan Meza-León	Dan Guterman, Ryan Ridley & Justin Roiland	September 20, 2015	1.79
Jerry is treated in an alien hospital after unknowingly ingesting some bacteria stored by Rick in a pint of Cherry Garcia. While his family is in the waiting room, watching an assortment of TV channels from alternate realities, Jerry is asked by doctors to donate his penis, to be converted into a replacement heart to save the life of civil rights activist Shrimply Pibbles. Jerry complies, but publicly tries to talk his way out of it nonetheless. This causes Jerry to be hated by the public, but also raises awareness as well as money to buy a synthetic heart for Pibbles. Eventually, Jerry changes his mind and holds the doctors hostage, demanding that they go through with the transplant procedure, but Security stops him. The family is then sent home, with Beth chastising Jerry that he should not care so much about what strangers think of him. Post-credits scene: Jerry tries to eat Rick's "Eyeholes", an alien cereal that appeared in the interdimensional TV, only for the Eyehole Man to burst through the window and begin relentlessly beating him.
20	9	"Look Who's Purging Now"	Dominic Polcino	Dan Harmon, Ryan Ridley & Justin Roiland	September 27, 2015	1.89
Rick and Morty visit another planet to purchase wiper fluid and witness "The Festival", an annual event where the local populace commits crimes for one night without consequence. After initial hesitation, Morty forces Rick to rescue Arthricia, a young alien girl, who proceeds to betray them, stealing Rick's gun and spaceship. Rick calls Summer, who transports them advanced armor suits. Morty then goes on a seemingly uncharacteristic killing spree before Rick knocks him out, and he and Arthricia—who desired to stop the Festival—storm the castle of the corrupt nobility who introduced it, slaughtering them. The planet's remaining inhabitants decide to create a new society; however, rioting breaks out over disputes, and one suggests keeping the Festival after all. Morty feels guilt over his rampage, but Rick (falsely) blames it on the effects of a candy bar he ate, and asserts that his character remains unchanged. Post-credits scene: Beth discovers that Jerry wasted $700 calling Taddy Mason, who charges money just to talk on the phone, telling him to get a job.
21	10	"The Wedding Squanchers"	Wes Archer	Tom Kauffman	October 4, 2015	1.84
Rick and his family attend the wedding of Birdperson and Tammy, whose guest list includes seventeen of the Federation's most wanted — including Rick and Birdperson. At the wedding reception, Tammy reveals herself to be a Federation agent and kills Birdperson. Numerous agents invade the building, starting a battle against the guests. Rick gets his family out of the wedding safely, but they are unable to return home as the Federation would be looking for them there, so Rick takes them to a terraformed asteroid. Rick overhears Jerry proposing to turn Rick in and return to Earth, so Rick allows himself to be arrested. His family returns to Earth, which has joined the Federation and is crowded by alien tourists. Jerry is assigned a job by the Federation. Post-credits scene: Mr. Poopybutthole asks the audience what they think will happen in season 3, and harasses a pizza delivery man with the same question. He also states that season 3 will come in a year and a half.

== Production ==
In January 2014, the series was renewed for a second season that began on July 26, 2015.

Wes Archer, Dominic Polcino, Bryan Newton and Juan Meza-León served as directors, while series co-creators Justin Roiland and Dan Harmon, Matt Roller, David Phillips, Ryan Ridley, Mike McMahan, Tom Kauffman, Dan Guterman and Alex Rubens served as writers. All episodes in the second season originally aired in the United States on Adult Swim. All episodes are rated TV-14, with the exception of "Interdimensional Cable 2: Tempting Fate", which was rated TV-MA-L.

== Reception ==
The second season has an approval rating of 91% on Rotten Tomatoes based on 117 reviews, with an average rating of 7.80 out of 10. The site's critics consensus reads: "Rick and Morty gains even more slimy layers of complexity throughout its sophomore season, with the dysfunctional duo knocking heads and diametrically opposed philosophies during a string of intricately hilarious misadventures."

Annie Howard of the Chicago Reader wrote: "The show's hyperactive, off-the-cuff energy is a special treat, even in an increasingly crowded animated-comedy field where other great shows like BoJack Horseman and Bob's Burgers compete for eyeballs."

== Home media ==
The second season was released on DVD (Region 1) and Blu-ray on June 7, 2016.
