= Rick and Morty season 3 =

Rick and Morty
- Season 3
- Blu-ray cover
- Showrunners: Dan Harmon; Justin Roiland
- Starring: Justin Roiland; Chris Parnell; Spencer Grammer; Sarah Chalke
- No. of episodes: 10

Release
- Original network: Adult Swim
- Original release: April 1 (Note: The third season of Rick and Morty premiered unannounced on April 1, 2017. The remaining episodes began airing weekly on July 30, 2017.) – October 1, 2017

Season chronology
- ← Previous; Season 2 Next → Season 4

The third season of Rick and Morty, an American animated television series created by Dan Harmon and Justin Roiland, originally aired on Cartoon Network's late night programming block, Adult Swim. It premiered with "The Rickshank Rickdemption", which aired unannounced on April 1, 2017, as part of Adult Swim's annual April Fools' prank. As a result of production delays, the remaining episodes began airing weekly nearly four months later, on July 30, 2017. The season comprised ten episodes but it originally was supposed to be fourteen episodes, and its initial airing concluded on October 1, 2017.

The premiere picks up where the second-season finale left off, as the show continues to follow the adventures of the members of the Smith household. When Jerry asks Beth to choose between him and Rick, the strength of their marriage is tested. Jerry is confronted with the loss of his family, while Beth begins to discover her independence again. Morty and Summer deal with their parents' separation by seeking more control over their lives. Rick's nihilistic way of life continues to prevent him from bonding with his family, as he remains unable to change his self-destructive behavior.

The third season of Rick and Morty delivered the highest ratings in Adult Swim's history and was the top-rated comedy among millennials on television. The season received largely positive reviews, with many critics highlighting its focus on character development. The season has also received a number of awards and nominations, including the win of a Critics' Choice Award for Best Animated Series, and the show's first Emmy Award which it won for the third-season's standout episode "Pickle Rick", in the category for Outstanding Animated Program.

== Cast and characters ==
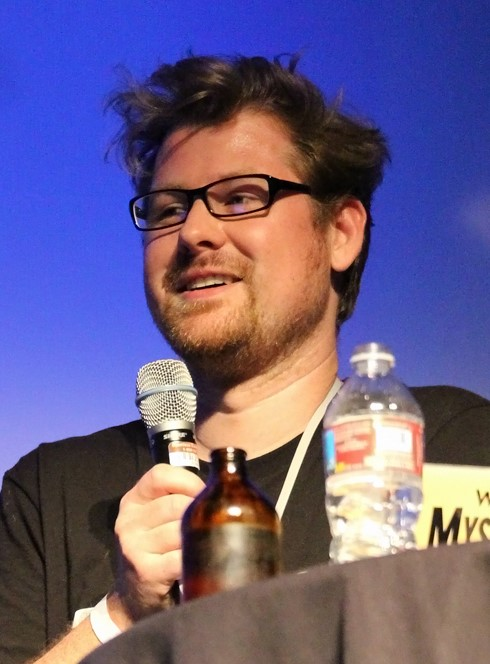
Rick and Morty co-creator Justin Roiland voices both eponymous characters.

=== Main cast ===
- Justin Roiland as Rick Sanchez C-137 and Morty Smith Prime, the two main characters of the show; Rick is an eccentric mad scientist and Morty is his kind but easily distressed grandson.
- Chris Parnell as Jerry Smith 5126, Rick's son-in-law and Morty's father; a simple-minded and insecure person, who disapproves of Rick's influence over his family.
- Spencer Grammer as Summer Smith C-131, Rick's granddaughter and Morty's sister; a conventional teenager who worries about improving her status among her peers.
- Sarah Chalke as Beth Smith C-131, Rick's daughter and Morty's mother; a generally level-headed person, who is dissatisfied with her marriage.

=== Recurring cast ===
- Kari Wahlgren as:
  - Jessica, Morty's classmate and crush.
  - Rick's Space Cruiser, the sentient artificial intelligence operating the garage and Rick's ship.

=== Guest cast ===
- Nathan Fillion as Cornvelious Daniel, an agent of the Galactic Federation.
- Tony Hale as Eli, Summer's neighbor in a post-apocalyptic version of Earth.
- Joel McHale as Hemorrhage, the leader of a post-apocalyptic scavenger group.
- Susan Sarandon as Dr. Wong, a family therapist.
- Danny Trejo as Jaguar, a human held prisoner by foreign government agents.
- Peter Serafinowicz as Foreign Government Agency Director Pavel Bartek.
- Christian Slater as Vance Maximus Renegade Star Soldier, an intergalactic superhero.
- Gillian Jacobs as Supernova, an intergalactic superhero.
- Logic (Bobby Hall) as himself, a performer at a party.
- Lance Reddick as Alan Rails, an intergalactic superhero.
- Thomas Middleditch as Tommy Lipkip, a childhood friend of Beth.
- Keith David as the President of the United States.

=== Other cast members ===
Other cast members of the season, who each have voiced one or more characters, include: Dan Harmon, Brandon Johnson, Tom Kenny, Maurice LaMarche, Nolan North, Cassie Steele, Laura Bailey, John DiMaggio, Ryan Ridley, Scott Chernoff, Dan Benson, Clancy Brown, Echo Kellum, Melique Berger, William Holmes, Tara Strong, Jeff B. Davis, Jonas Briedis, Phil Hendrie, Rob Paulsen, Alex Jayne Go, Jennifer Hale and Mariana Wise.

== Episodes ==
No. overall	No. in season	Title	Directed by	Written by	Original release date	U.S. viewers (millions)
22	1	"The Rickshank Rickdemption"	Juan Meza-León	Mike McMahan	April 1, 2017	0.68 (Note: This episode premiered unannounced and re-ran for four hours straight with improving ratings. This is the viewership of only the first broadcast of the episode.)
Rick is interrogated via a mind-computer link, inside a galactic federal prison. Summer and Morty attempt to rescue him but they are captured by SEAL Team Ricks, who take them to the Citadel of Ricks and decide to assassinate Rick. Back at the prison, Rick repeatedly switches bodies with both the federal agents and his aspiring assassins to reach the teleporter room of the Citadel of Ricks. He then teleports the entire Citadel into the federal prison, prompting a massive battle. Amid the confusion, Rick rescues Morty and Summer, and uses the Galactic Federation's mainframe to make its currency worthless. This causes the Federation to collapse and leave Earth. Rick, Morty, and Summer return home, where Jerry gives Beth an ultimatum to choose between him and Rick. Beth chooses Rick and the couple decide to get a divorce. Rick reveals to Morty that his ulterior motive was to become his de facto male influence and get revenge at Jerry for threatening to turn him in to the authorities. This escalates into a monologue, centered around Rick's desire to find more McDonald's Szechuan sauce, a discontinued promotional product for the film Mulan. Post-credits scene: Tammy observes Birdperson's resurrection as a cyborg dubbed "Phoenixperson".
23	2	"Rickmancing the Stone"	Dominic Polcino	Jane Becker	July 30, 2017	2.86
Rick takes Morty and Summer to a post-apocalyptic version of Earth, where they are chased by a group of scavengers, known as Death Stalkers. Rick notices that the group is carrying a valuable rock of Isotope 322, so he and the kids join them in hope of stealing it. Summer falls in love with the Death Stalkers' leader, while Morty is given the strength of a giant arm, which takes him in search of its previous owner's killer. Rick leaves and replaces the kids with androids to fool Beth. When he returns, he helps the Death Stalkers use the Isotope to power a more advanced civilization. Summer does not like how the change softens the Death Stalkers, and she decides to follow Rick and Morty back home. Before leaving, Rick steals the isotope. The experience helps the kids overcome their parents' divorce. Summer reconciles with Jerry, and Morty realizes he must live his own life. Post-credits scene: As Jerry receives his unemployment check, a wolf bullies him into handing it over. The wolf eats the check and regurgitates it.
24	3	"Pickle Rick"	Anthony Chun	Jessica Gao	August 6, 2017	2.31
Rick turns himself into a pickle to get out of attending a school-sanctioned family therapy, but Beth takes Rick's serum which would revert the transformation. Left alone, Rick eventually rolls into an open sewer drain, where he manages to manipulate the nervous systems of dead roaches and rats to build himself a mobile exoskeleton, with added weapons such as razors and drills. He unwittingly escapes into a foreign government agency. The guards try to kill Rick, under orders from the agency director, but Rick kills them all. In the process, Rick battles and ultimately befriends a prisoner named Jaguar. Near death and in need of the serum, Rick is forced to attend the therapy session, arriving towards the end. Dr. Wong gives her diagnosis, observing that Rick crafts relationships that punish emotions and vulnerability. On their way home, Rick apologizes to Beth for deceiving her and uses the serum to turn human again. Morty and Summer wish to continue seeing Dr. Wong, but Rick and Beth ignore them. Post-credits scene: Jaguar saves Rick and Morty from being killed in an elaborate piano death machine by a villain named "Concerto".
25	4	"Vindicators 3: The Return of Worldender"	Bryan Newton	Sarah Carbiener & Erica Rosbe	August 13, 2017	2.66
At Morty's insistence, Rick agrees to meet again with the Vindicators, a group of intergalactic superheroes, to fight their archnemesis, Worldender. Rick cannot hide his disdain for the superheroes, while Morty is thrilled. The next morning, the Vindicators enter Worldender's base. They find that, while Rick was blackout drunk the previous night, he killed Worldender and set up a variety of puzzles that the Vindicators must solve to survive. They start arguing and kill one another, while Morty solves all the puzzles. After all puzzles are solved, the only ones left alive are Rick, Morty, and Supernova, who is a member of the Vindicators. Supernova tries to kill Rick and Morty. Before she can do so, the three of them are transported to a party that Rick also set up while blackout drunk, and she escapes. Post-credits scene: Gearhead tries to use a Vindicators vest to impress some teen girls, but when an alien terrorist attack strikes, he flees then trips and falls, breaking into pieces.
26	5	"The Whirly Dirly Conspiracy"	Juan Meza-León	Ryan Ridley	August 20, 2017	2.29
At Morty's request, Rick takes Jerry on an adventure to bolster Jerry's self-esteem. They visit an alien resort where Jerry encounters Risotto Groupon, an alien who blames Rick for his kingdom being usurped. Risotto enlists Jerry in a plot to kill Rick, but the attempt fails and Rick deduces Jerry's involvement, sparking a monologue of him accusing Jerry of deliberately acting helpless to guilt others into helping him. After Rick kills Risotto, he softens his attitude towards Jerry, but refuses to let him return to the family. Meanwhile, Summer's boyfriend Ethan leaves her for a larger-breasted girlfriend, and Summer attempts to enlarge her own breasts using one of Rick's devices. Her aim is off, and her and Beth's attempts to fix things only cause her to be turned inside out and grow into a giant. Beth is tricked into releasing three tiny technical support workers that were trapped inside the machine. Summer disappears to the campsite she and Ethan were supposed to go, still inside out. Beth turns herself inside out and talks to Summer, reconciling. Once Morty figures out how the machine works, he restores Summer's size and spitefully uses it to deform Ethan. Post-credits scene: The three tiny workers are enjoying their retirement. As a deformed Ethan walks by, one of them is snatched by an eagle.
27	6	"Rest and Ricklaxation"	Anthony Chun	Tom Kauffman	August 27, 2017	2.47
After a traumatic six-day adventure, Rick and Morty decide to spend some time at an alien spa, where they use a machine that extracts a person's negative personality traits. However, unbeknownst to them, those traits are transposed into toxic physical counterparts, characterized by Rick's arrogance and Morty's self-loathing. The Clean Rick becomes more considerate, and Clean Morty's confidence soars, which allows him to start dating girls. Swearing revenge on Clean Rick, Toxic Rick takes Toxic Morty, breaks out of the machine, and uses a moonlight tower to remake the whole Earth into a toxic version of itself. Clean Rick reverts the situation by poisoning Toxic Morty, correctly deducing that the true Rick considered his compassion for Morty a weakness, meaning Toxic Rick has inherited that trait. Toxic Rick angrily merges with Clean Rick to save Toxic Morty, bringing back the true Rick. Clean Morty avoids merging back with his toxic counterpart and goes on to live a life as a stockbroker in New York City. Rick tracks him down with Jessica's help and restores order by re-injecting Toxic Morty back into Clean Morty. Post-credits scene: A tour of the same moonlight tower releases Stacy, one of the girls Morty dated in the episode, who had been inadvertently trapped inside the toxin machine.
28	7	"The Ricklantis Mixup" (Note: An alternate title used for this episode is "Tales from the Citadel".)	Dominic Polcino	Dan Guterman & Ryan Ridley	September 10, 2017	2.38
As Rick and Morty adventure to Atlantis, the episode shifts focus towards the Citadel, a secret society populated by numerous versions of Ricks and Mortys. There, a group of Mortys journey to a portal to have their wishes granted; a novice police officer Rick starts working with a veteran police Morty to take down drug dealers; a worker Rick revolts at a wafer factory, where the key ingredient is extracted from a Rick hooked up to a machine to re-experience his best memories; and an election is held for the new president of the Citadel. Despite being the underdog, the Morty Party candidate manages to secure the presidency. When his campaign manager receives information that the new president is in fact Evil Morty from the first-season episode "Close Rick-counters of the Rick Kind", he attempts to assassinate Candidate Morty but fails. Once he assumes office, President Morty orders the execution of a shadow council of Ricks and anybody else he considers a potential threat to his rule. Post-credits scene: Rick and Morty return home from Atlantis, satisfied with their trip. Morty wonders what happened at the Citadel, but Rick tells him it will likely have no effect on their lives.
29	8	"Morty's Mind Blowers"	Bryan Newton	Mike McMahan, James Siciliano, Ryan Ridley, Dan Guterman, Justin Roiland & Dan Harmon	September 17, 2017	2.51
After Morty requests to have a traumatic memory deleted, Rick reveals a room where he has been storing a number of memories he has removed from Morty's mind. As it turns out, besides the memories that Morty did not want to keep from their adventures, the room also contains memories in which Rick was made to look foolish, so he had them forcibly removed from Morty. This revelation prompts a fight, during which Rick and Morty have their memories accidentally erased. Morty scours the memories around him to replace the ones he lost, but he is displeased with the truth he finds, and convinces Rick that they should kill themselves. Summer enters the room moments before they committed suicide. At this point, it is revealed that Rick has a contingency plan should this happen. Following written instructions, Summer tranquilizes Rick and Morty, restores their memories, and drags them to the living room. Rick and Morty wake up on the couch, believing that they slept through an entire "Interdimensional Cable" episode. Post-credits scene: Jerry discovers a box labeled "Jerry's Mind Blowers", which contains a memory of him being accidentally responsible for the death of an alien.
30	9	"The ABC's of Beth"	Juan Meza-León	Mike McMahan	September 24, 2017	2.49
Rick and Beth enter Froopyland, a fantasy world created by Rick for young Beth. Their goal is to recover Tommy, Beth's childhood friend who has been trapped in Froopyland, and prevent the execution of his father, who is being falsely accused of eating him. Tommy, who has survived all these years by resorting to bestiality, incest and cannibalism, refuses to return to the real world. Rick and Beth manage to save his father's life by creating a clone of Tommy. Back at home, Beth is presented with the option of having a replacement clone of her created, so that she will be free to travel the world. Meanwhile, Jerry dates an alien hunter named Kiara, to Morty and Summer's dismay. When he decides to get out of the relationship, Kiara is enraged and tries to kill the kids, whom she holds responsible. The situation is resolved following the revelation that Kiara was using Jerry to get over her previous boyfriend, much like Jerry was doing with her. Post-credits scene: Jerry's answering machine plays messages warning him that Kiara's boyfriend is coming to kill him, and Rick saying that he has killed Kiara's boyfriend, but also had sex with her.
31	10	"The Rickchurian Mortydate"	Anthony Chun	Dan Harmon	October 1, 2017	2.60
The President calls on Rick and Morty to defeat a monster in the tunnels underneath the White House, which they do with little effort. Annoyed that he constantly calls on them without any gratitude, they go back home to play Minecraft, with the President quickly finding out. The resulting argument leads to a battle of egos that culminates in a fight in the White House between Rick and the President's security. Meanwhile, fearing she might be a clone made by Rick, Beth reunites with Jerry to figure out the truth. Shortly after, the entire family gets together to hide from Rick, but he tracks them down. Rick eventually submits to Jerry once again being a family member. Rick ends his conflict with the President by pretending to be Fly Fishing Rick, a Rick from a different reality, and calling a truce. The episode ends with the family happy to be together again, except for Rick who is disappointed about losing his dominant position. Post-credits scene: Mr. Poopybutthole apologizes for not appearing in Season 3, but he has gotten married and had a son. He ends the scene by saying that it will be a long wait until season 4.

== Production ==
=== Renewal and staff additions ===
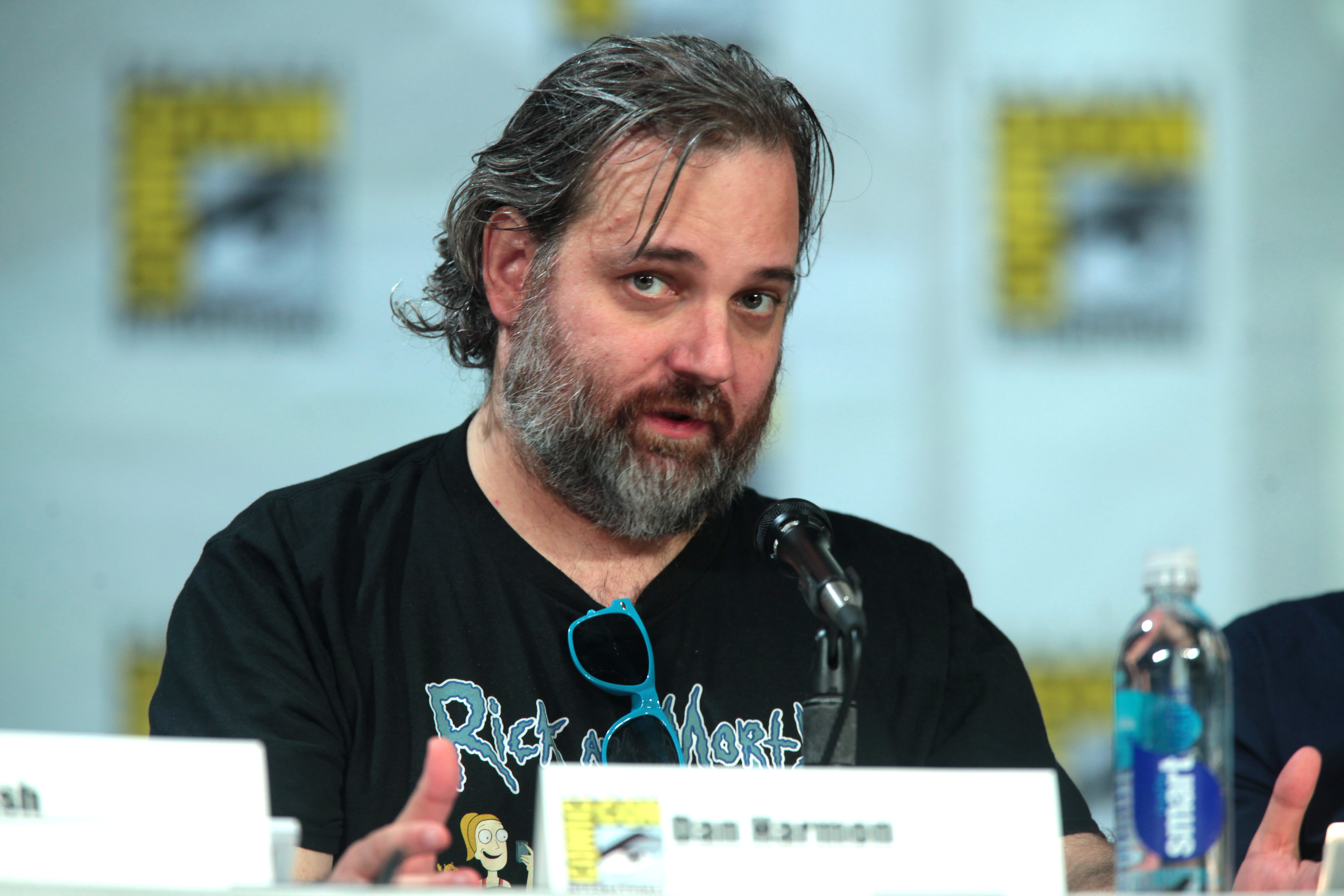
Rick and Morty co-creator Dan Harmon

Adult Swim renewed Rick and Morty for a third season on August 12, 2015, shortly after a successful second-season premiere. Talking about the renewal, the two co-creators and executive producers expressed their delight at the series' popularity. Dan Harmon stated that it is "an honor to see Rick and Morty join the exclusive club of shows with over nineteen episodes", and Justin Roiland added "I am blown away by the seemingly instant success of Rick and Morty. I look forward to continuing their adventures!"

In an October 2015 interview with The Hollywood Reporter, Roiland revealed that the team had received a lot of scripts from female writers for the upcoming season, which had never happened before. He stated that "We've gone from having zero spec scripts [in the running from female] candidates, to having five or six of them, so it's looking very likely that season three will have one, potentially two gals in the room." Eventually, four female writers were added to the staff, and—counting out the co-creators of the show, Justin Roiland and Dan Harmon—the writing room for the third season was gender-balanced.

The writing staff consisted of eleven writers, who collectively wrote and repeatedly rewrote each episode. Harmon noted that the writers' ideas were blended and refined during the writing process, and that the name of the writer that appeared in the opening credits of an episode is usually that of the person who had been assigned to prepare the episode's outline. Sarah Carbiener, one of the new female writers, said that she managed to learn many things from her experience as a member of the writing team. She explained that a story that for other shows would have been an entire episode, for Rick and Morty it will be only its first few minutes. Therefore, the team had to write a large amount of story in a very short time.

=== Schedule delays and conclusion ===
Writing began on November 2, 2015, and the first episode was recorded on February 18, 2016. In July 2016, already behind on schedule, the production team admitted that the success of the series had increased pressure to meet the expectations of the viewers. The creative freedom provided by Adult Swim entailed taking responsibility for product quality, and as the bar had risen higher, work had become harder, improvements were constantly being sought, and this often resulted in delays. Harmon told the assembled press at the 2016 San Diego Comic-Con that "it's not an endless perfectionism because you know when something finally clicks and you go 'this is a good episode of TV.'" He added that the animators had to suffer the worst part of the schedule delays, as they were forced to work weekends in order to cope with the demanding workload.

Screenshot of a "Pickle Rick" animatic

In September 2016, the writing team had finished writing new episodes and they were waiting on their return from Bardel Entertainment, Rick and Morty's Canadian animation studio, for in-house screenings. After the animatics (video recorded versions of a hand-drawn storyboard with very limited motion) for each episode were made, and the production team was able to pre-visualize the animation, additional passes on the scripts would follow. In an interview with The Detroit Cast, writer Ryan Ridley revealed that the writing process for the third season was completed in November 2016, and noted that a season of Rick and Morty takes a long time to write and animate.

In February 2017, Harmon announced on his podcast, Harmontown, that the season was in the animation process, after a long period of writing. Around the same time, Bardel Entertainment's production supervisor Mark Van Ee confirmed that "everything is on track." In June 2017, when production of the season had been completed, Harmon wrote a series of posts on Twitter, where he refuted reports about his disagreements with Roiland being the main cause of the delay, and explained that the writing process took longer than expected to complete because of his perfectionism. Although it was revealed a few years later that Roiland's inability to focus on his writing duties along with creating distractions in the writer's room also led to various delays, causing a lot of tension between him and Harmon which forced the show to bring in a mediator to salvage their partnership. As a result, the third season of Rick and Morty consisted of only ten episodes instead of fourteen, as was initially intended.

== Release ==
The third season of Rick and Morty originally aired Sundays at 11:30 p.m EST. on Adult Swim, the adult-oriented nighttime programming block of Cartoon Network. The network offered free livestreams for the first two episodes of the season, with the remaining episodes requiring a cable subscription to watch the show live as it aired. Following the conclusion of the show's third season, Adult Swim made a livestream marathon of Rick and Morty available to watch on its official website in select regions, hoping to dissuade viewers from watching other illegal livestreams.

The episodes were made available to watch on Netflix in a number of countries outside the United States, one week after their original airdate. The season was added to Hulu on June 23, 2018, with the expansion following a similar timeline with that of the two previous seasons for the streaming service. Uncensored versions of the season are also available to purchase on various digital distribution platforms, including iTunes, Amazon and Microsoft Store. The digital release includes commentaries on every episode, and seven more short videos featuring co-creators Dan Harmon and Justin Roiland.

The season was released on DVD and Blu-ray on May 15, 2018, with special features including exclusive commentary and animatics for every episode, the origins of Rick and Morty, "inside the episode" material and an exclusive "inside the recording booth" session. Game of Thrones star Peter Dinklage and showrunners David Benioff and D. B. Weiss recorded audio commentary for the episode "Pickle Rick". Other guest commentaries include Marilyn Manson, Courtney Love, Russell Brand, and the winner of a crowdfunding campaign launched by Justin Roiland and Dan Harmon to support Planned Parenthood. In his Blu-ray review for Forbes, Luke Y. Thompson describes the release as "a thorough set that seems to have covered all the angles, and will provide hours of fun to even those fans who've watched every episode multiple times already."

== Reception ==
=== Critical response ===
On Rotten Tomatoes, the season has a 96% approval rating based on 175 reviews, with an average rating of 8.95 out of 10. The site's consensus reads: "Rick and Morty dives into new and even kookier cosmic dilemmas in a third season that interrogates familial bonds, love, and nihilism—treating all existential topics to the series' trademark serrated wit."

Jesse Schedeen of IGN described the third season of the show as darker and more unpredictable than the first two, and praised its high-concept storytelling and character development. Schedeen gave the season an 8.8 out of 10 rating, saying that it "didn't quite reach the heights of Season 2, but it is the series' most consistently entertaining and ambitious season yet". Holding a similar position, Corey Plante of Inverse said that Rick and Morty managed to be both dark and funny in its third season.

Zack Handlen of The A.V. Club agreed that this was the darkest season of Rick and Morty, though he noted that the viewers have become desensitized to the show's violence. "In previous seasons, the show managed a balance between self-mockery and honest joy in absurd scenarios. That joy is still there, more or less, but there's a bitterness to it that's harder and harder to ignore." Mike Cosimano of Comics Gaming Magazine did not think that the third season was dark; he said that it used "cheap gut punches to elicit that very reaction". He added that too many of the season's episodes were weak, since the show focuses on character development only in its first half, resulting in an uneven season. He considered the season to be a disappointment, rating it 6.5 out of 10.

Kayla Cobb of Decider focused on the dynamism displayed by Beth and Summer, as the characters broke the stereotypical conventions of the first two seasons. Cobb stated that "Season 3 is the first time Rick and Morty really handed over the reigns [sic] to its leading ladies, and it was a horrifying delight." Julia Alexander of Polygon highlighted the philosophical conflict between nihilist realism and life in ignorant bliss as the season's main theme, and noted that "after an introspective season built on the importance of self-realization and reflection, Rick and Morty's third year ended on a total reset," with Beth and the kids reuniting with Jerry in the season-finale, as they seek comfort through escapism and ignore the realities of their lives. Zack Handlen considered Jerry's return to be an anticlimax and "a necessary corrective to an arc that was in danger of going off the rails completely". Handlen appeared skeptical about Beth's statement in the final episode, that from this point things will be like season one again, saying that "the problem with going as far as season three went is that bridges stay burned."

=== Ratings ===
Ratings for the third season of Rick and Morty. Unannounced premiere Weekly episodes

Rick and Morty completed its third season with overall viewership numbers increased by 81% over the previous season, and delivered the highest ratings in Adult Swim's history. Rick and Morty was the most popular television comedy within the 18–24 and 18–34 age ranges in the United States, based on "Live+7" ratings data spanning from December 2016 to September 2017. This rating system tracks live viewership plus streaming and on-demand viewing over an initial week-long period, and provides a more accurate picture of delayed viewing as compared to "Live+Same Day" ratings. Considering that episodes of the third season originally aired at 11:30 p.m. on Sundays, it is very likely that people would have watched them on-demand the next day or several days later.

Christina Miller, the president of Adult Swim, told Fortune that Rick and Morty "goes beyond just appealing to millennials," as numbers suggest that people of all ages are watching the show. The second episode of the season, which aired nearly four months after the unannounced premiere, was the season's, and the series', most-watched episode with 2.86 million viewers, and the second-best on cable for the day it aired in adults 18–49, behind the weekly episode of Game of Thrones. The season finale was watched by 2.6 million live plus same day viewers and it was the most-watched telecast across all age groups.

=== Fanbase reactions ===
In an interview with The Hollywood Reporter, female writers Jane Becker, Sarah Carbiener and Jessica Gao addressed negative comments regarding their involvement in writing the third season of Rick and Morty, recalling a post on Reddit that called them "the social justice warriors that Dan had to hire". Gao stated:

The people who say [hiring writers should be a meritocracy] have never ever thought about what that actually means and where that meritocracy comes from.

Following the release of "Pickle Rick", one of the season's best-rated episodes, a number of fans participated in an online harassment campaign that targeted female writers of the show—especially Jane Becker and Jessica Gao—as they felt that they were "ruining the show" for them. Said writers received rape and death threats on Twitter, and had their personal information put online. Dan Harmon confronted the trolls by blocking them and starting the #HarmonBlock hashtag up until the production of season 4. In an interview with Entertainment Weekly, Harmon said:

I think it's all disgusting. These knobs, that want to protect the content they think they own—and somehow combine that with their need to be proud of something they have, which is often only their race or gender.

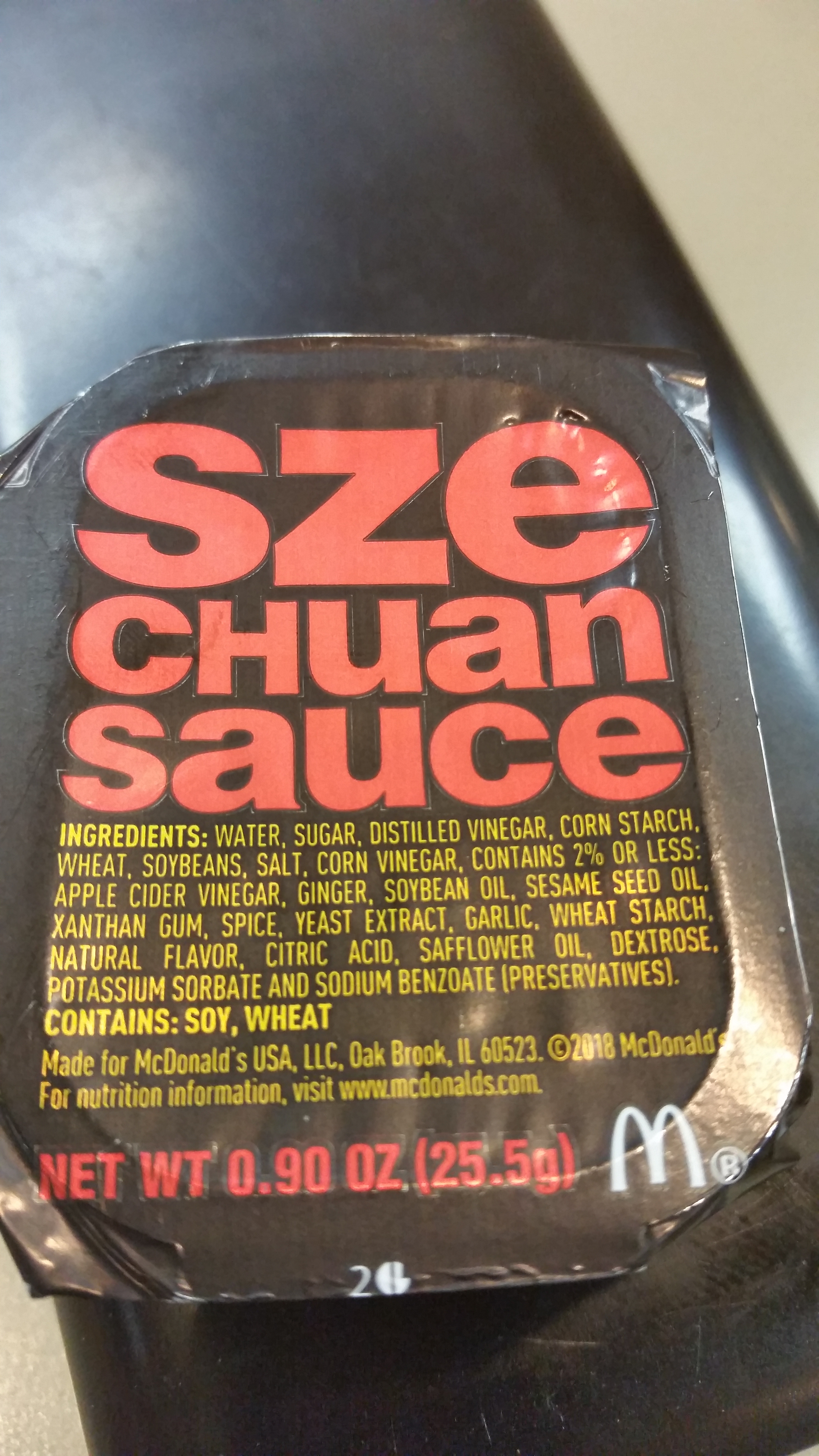
A packet of Szechuan sauce

The Szechuan sauce reference in the season premiere brought huge online attention for McDonald's discontinued promotional product. Internet memes spread rapidly on Reddit and Twitter, more than 40,000 people signed a petition at Change.org, asking for the return of the sauce, while an eBay auction resulted in a 20-year-old packet of this teriyaki sauce being sold for $14,700. On October 7, 2017, McDonald's served limited quantities of the sauce, without explicitly naming Rick and Morty as a reason for the return. Many fans waited for hours in long queues, but not all of them were served as the fast-food outlets ran out of the product. The fiasco prompted enraged reactions by disappointed fans, with some of them acting out and mistreating the company's workers.

In the wake of these events, the Rick and Morty fanbase received a bad reputation, with James Grebey of Inverse noting:

Rick and Morty is a good show, but it's quickly gaining a (frankly well-earned) reputation for having a really, really shitty fan base. Even series co-creator Dan Harmon hates a certain segment of his misogynistic fan base.

Cameron Williams of Junkee attributed this "toxic behavior" to the rise of an aggressive type of entitled fan in the past decades, and examined the motivation of these people, noting:

It's hard to feel special when you're a face in the crowd of millions of people. A lot of bad behaving fans look for an excuse to be oppressed so they can separate themselves from the mainstream.

Emily Gaudette of Newsweek said that, with the spike in popularity, the show has obtained an army of online devotees, and commented on groups like the self-described "Real Ricks", who identify themselves with the series' main character and believe that high intellect is an excuse for mistreating others. Gaudette noted that these groups do not represent the Rick and Morty fanbase, but they "tend to suck all the oxygen out of the virtual room." Series co-creator Justin Roiland said on his Twitter account that he sees more good than bad in the series' fanbase, and chooses to focus on that.

=== Accolades ===
Rick and Morty received a total of eight nominations for its third season in 2017 and 2018, of which it won an IGN Award and a Critics' Choice Television Award, both in the categories for "Best Animated Series". Furthermore, the episode "Pickle Rick" received three nominations, of which it won an Emmy Award for "Outstanding Animated Program" and an Annie Award for "Best General Audience Animated Television/Broadcast Production". With two nominations, "The Ricklantis Mixup" was another awarded episode of the season, that won its writers Ryan Ridley and Dan Guterman an Annie Award for "Outstanding Achievement for Writing in an Animated Television/Broadcast Production". Justin Roiland won an IGN Award for "Best Comedic TV Performance", while Christian Slater was nominated for a BTVA Voice Acting Award for his performance in "Vindicators 3: The Return of Worldender".

Year	Award	Category	Nominee(s)	Result	Ref.
2017	Teen Choice Awards	Choice Animated TV Show	Rick and Morty	Nominated	
2017	IGN Awards	TV series of the year	Rick and Morty	Nominated	
2017	IGN Awards	Best TV Episode	"The Ricklantis Mixup"	Nominated	
2017	IGN Awards	Best Animated Series	Rick and Morty	Won	
2017	IGN Awards	Best Comedy Series	Rick and Morty	Nominated	
2017	IGN Awards	Best Comedic TV Performance	Justin Roiland	Won	
2018	Critics' Choice Television Awards	Best Animated Series	Rick and Morty	Won	
2018	Annie Awards	Best General Audience Animated Television/Broadcast Production	"Pickle Rick"	Won	
2018	Annie Awards	Outstanding Achievement for Writing in an Animated Television/Broadcast Production	Ryan Ridley, Dan Guterman (for "The Ricklantis Mixup")	Won	
2018	Golden Reel Awards	Outstanding Achievement in Sound Editing – Animation Short Form	Hunter Curra, Kailand Reily, Andrew Twite, Joy Elett, Jeff Halbert, Konrad Pinon (for "Pickle Rick")	Nominated	
2018	BTVA Voice Acting Awards	Best Male Vocal Performance in a Television Series in a Guest Role	Christian Slater	Nominated	
2018	Saturn Awards	Best Animated Series or Film on Television	Rick and Morty	Nominated	
2018	Teen Choice Awards	Choice Animated TV Show	Rick and Morty	Nominated	
2018	Primetime Emmy Awards	Outstanding Animated Program	Dan Harmon, Justin Roiland, Delna Bhesania, Barry Ward, Keith Crofford, Mike Lazzo, Ryan Ridley, Dan Guterman, Mike McMahan, Tom Kauffman, Ollie Green, J. Michael Mendel, Jessica Gao, Wes Archer, Anthony Chun, Nathan Litz (for "Pickle Rick")	Won	
