= The Ricks Must Be Crazy =

- Rick and Morty episode
- Episode no.: Season 2 Episode 6
- Directed by: Dominic Polcino
- Written by: Dan Guterman
- Original air date: August 30, 2015
- Running time: 23 minutes

Guest appearances
- Stephen Colbert as Zeep Xanflorp; Nathan Fielder as Kyle; Alan Tudyk as Chris

Episode chronology
← Previous "Get Schwifty"	Next → "Big Trouble in Little Sanchez"
- Rick and Morty (season 2)

"The Ricks Must Be Crazy" is the sixth episode in the second season of the American animated television sitcom Rick and Morty, and the seventeenth overall episode in the series. Written by Dan Guterman and directed by Dominic Polcino, the episode first aired on Adult Swim in the United States on August 30, 2015. The title of the episode is a reference to the 1980 film The Gods Must Be Crazy.

In the episode, Rick and Morty go inside Rick's microverse car battery, an entire verse that generates electricity to power Rick's car, unbeknown to the citizens of the microverse. Zeep Xanflorp, a scientist in the microverse, creates his own microverse, thus stopping the flow of energy to Rick's car. The episode largely takes place in Zeep's microverse, with Rick, Morty and Zeep attempting to escape it.

== Plot ==
On a trip to an alternate dimension, Rick, Morty, and Summer discover that Rick's car battery is malfunctioning. Rick takes Morty inside the car battery to repair it and leaves Summer waiting in the car, instructing it to "Keep Summer safe." Morty discovers that the car battery is actually a microverse battery, containing an entire universe to supply power to the car. Rick gave "gooble box" technology to an intelligent species to generate electricity, but unbeknownst to them he takes a majority of the generated power. This leads Morty to question Rick's ethics, calling it "slavery with extra steps".

Rick and Morty discover that a scientist and microverse citizen named Zeep Xanflorp (Stephen Colbert) has made his own 'miniverse', which renders gooble boxes obsolete. Rick, Morty and Zeep enter the miniverse, and discover that Kyle, a scientist living in Zeep's battery, is also working on his own 'teenyverse', which Morty and the three scientists enter. Once both Zeep and Kyle discover that they are slaves born to make electricity, Zeep attacks Rick in a rage including asking if a god created Rick's universe too which Rick denies due to his Atheism. During the struggle, Kyle commits suicide using his spaceship, leaving Rick, Morty and Zeep stranded in the teenyverse.

Several months later (in teenyverse time), Morty forces Rick and Zeep to put aside their differences and create a way to get back to Zeep's world. When they get back however, Zeep attempts to kill Rick and Morty. Rick kills two birds with one stone when he destroys Zeep's miniverse and in the process Kyle's teenyverse, and after a brawl Rick ultimately defeats him. Rick and Morty safely return to their universe, while Zeep realises he must stop his experimentation with miniverse technology and return to gooble boxes, or else Rick will throw away the battery and destroy his world.

Back in the parking lot, Rick's car uses extreme defensive tactics, including dicing up a person, paralysation and psychological torture, to keep Summer safe from various assailants. While a horrified Summer attempts to stop the car from hurting anyone, an escalating standoff ensues between the parked car and the police and military. Upon Summer's continued demand, the car forgoes physical and psychological violence and instead escapes the situation by engineering a peace treaty between the planet's two warring factions, humans and telepathic giant spiders, in return for guaranteed safety.

Rick, Morty, and Summer go to an ice cream shop on the same planet. Rick complains that his ice cream is full of flies, which the waitress reveals to be a result of the treaty. Rick accuses Summer and berates her for ruining ice cream.

In a post-credits scene, Morty is in class and accidentally turns into a car.

== Reception ==
"The Ricks Must Be Crazy" has received critical acclaim. Joe Matar of Den of Geek gave the episode a 5/5 rating, saying that "This is a fantastic episode that takes Rick and Morty’s established tropes and plays with them in really fun ways." Stacey Taylor of Geek Syndicate gave the episode a 4/5 rating, saying that "The Ricks Must Be Crazy is an almost perfect episode, with the laughs coming thick and fast but serving not to downplay the death, or the dark and disturbing sequences, but more to compliment them." Jesse Schedeen of IGN gave the episode an 8.8 out of 10 rating, saying that "This week's episode didn't quite reach the heights this show is capable of, but it was an all-around entertaining installment." Zack Handlen of The A.V. Club gave the episode an A− rating, noting that "What makes Rick such a fascinating anti-hero is that the more we see of the realities of this show, the less he seems like an “anti-hero” at all."
