= Ricksy Business =

- Rick and Morty episode
- Episode no.: Season 1 Episode 11
- Directed by: Stephen Sandoval
- Written by: Ryan Ridley; Tom Kauffman
- Original air date: April 14, 2014
- Running time: 22 minutes

Guest appearances
- Kari Wahlgren as Jessica; Echo Kellum as Brad; Cassie Steele as Tammy Gueterman; Dan Harmon as Birdperson; Maurice LaMarche as Abradolf Lincler; Aislinn Paul as Nancy; Alejandra Gollas as Lucy; Tom Kenny as Squanchy; Scott Chernoff as Revolio "Gearhead" Clockberg Jr.; Chris Romano as Slow Mobius

Episode chronology
← Previous "Close Rick-counters of the Rick Kind"	Next → "A Rickle in Time"
- Rick and Morty season 1

"Ricksy Business" is the eleventh and final episode of the first season of the American science fiction television series Rick and Morty. Written by Ryan Ridley and Tom Kauffman and directed by Stephen Sandoval, the episode aired on April 14, 2014. The title of the episode is a pun to the film, Risky Business.

== Plot ==
Jerry and Beth participate in a reenactment of Titanic, but the ship unexpectedly fails to sink. Jerry spends some time alone with Lucy, a female janitor who eventually proves to be a deranged fan of the movie, forcing him to imitate scenes with her at gunpoint. She almost rapes Jerry, but Beth saves him. Meanwhile, Rick is left in charge of Morty and Summer, but they have a large party. Among the guests are teenagers, aliens, Gearhead, Squanchy, alternate Ricks and Abradolf Lincler (a DNA combination of Adolf Hitler and Abraham Lincoln). Not only do they make a mess, but the whole house is accidentally sent into another dimension, where Lincler seemingly dies. Ultimately, the guests are sent away and the house is returned to its place. Rick, Morty and Summer only have minutes to spare before Beth and Jerry arrive, so they use a contraption to freeze time, allowing them to repair the house. They watch Titanic and unanimously agree on how terrible it is. In the post-credits scene, giant alien beasts repeatedly insert and remove Lincler and a teenager from the party in their bodies.

== Reception ==
=== Ratings ===
On its airdate, "Ricksy Business" was watched by 2.13 million American viewers.

=== Critical response ===
The first season has an approval rating of 96% on Rotten Tomatoes based on 28 reviews, with an average rating of 8.19 out of 10. The site's critics consensus reads, "Rick and Morty zaps onto screens and makes an instant impression with its vivid splashes of color, improvisational voice acting, and densely-plotted science fiction escapades -- bringing a surprising amount of heart to a cosmically heartless premise."

Joe Matar of Den of Geek praised the episode, giving it four out of five stars and saying "It's less about the story and more about throwing ridiculous sci-fi thing after thing at us, making for a sort of a quantity over quality episode. But that's not really accurate because all the sci-fi stuff is pretty quality. The one-off characters are loads of absurd fun and there are a number of fantastic one-liners" Zack Handlen of The A.V. Club said "Here were are the end of season one, with an episode that sits firmly in the show's comfort zone; nothing remarkable, nothing really envelope pushing, but consistently inventive, funny, and just the right amount of sweetness to set off the sour."
