= Thunderdome =

Thunderdome may refer to:

== Music ==
- "We Don't Need Another Hero" (Thunderdome), a 1985 song by Tina Turner featured in the film
- Thunderdome (album), a 2004 album by the German melodic-metal band Pink Cream 69
- Thunderdome (music festival), a gabber music event in the Netherlands
- "Thunderdome", a song by German metal band Primal Fear from the album Primal Fear

== Sports facilities ==
=== United States ===
- The former name of Tropicana Field, a domed stadium in St. Petersburg, Florida
- WWE ThunderDome, WWE's behind closed doors arena production and staging during the COVID-19 pandemic
- A nickname for Paycom Center, a multi-purpose arena in Oklahoma City, Oklahoma
- A nickname for Hubert H. Humphrey Metrodome, a former domed stadium in Minneapolis, Minnesota
- A nickname for the UC Santa Barbara Events Center, an indoor multi-purpose arena at the University of California, Santa Barbara, California

=== Other locations ===
- Thunderdome Stadium, a former name of SCG Stadium, Muang Thong Thani, Nonthaburi, Thailand
- Calder Park Thunderdome, an oval speedway in Melbourne, Australia
- A former name of Gateshead International Stadium, England

== Other uses ==
- Thunderdome is an arena for steel-cage fights to the death in the 1985 Australian post-apocalyptic film Mad Max Beyond Thunderdome
- Death Guild Thunderdome, a popular regular feature at Burning Man, recreating the arena from the film Mad Max Beyond Thunderdome at the Death Guild camp
