= Total Rickall =

- Rick and Morty episode
- Episode no.: Season 2 Episode 4
- Directed by: Juan Meza-León
- Written by: Mike McMahan
- Original air date: August 16, 2015
- Running time: 22 minutes

Guest appearances
- Matt Walsh as Sleepy Gary; Tom Kenny as Nazi Soldier and Pencilvester; Tara Strong as Tinkles; Keith David as Reverse Giraffe; Tony Barbieri as Uncle Steve; Kevin Michael Richardson as Frankenstein

Episode chronology
← Previous "Auto Erotic Assimilation"	Next → "Get Schwifty"
- Rick and Morty season 2

"Total Rickall" is the fourth episode of the second season of the Adult Swim animated television series Rick and Morty. Written by Mike McMahan and directed by Juan Meza-León, the episode premiered on August 16, 2015. It shows the Smith family, along with Mr. Poopybutthole, overwhelmed by an infestation of parasites who implant false memories into them so they cannot tell who is real.

The episode is a "clip show", with heavy use of flashback scenes to the parasite-implanted false memories; it was inspired by the introduction of Dawn Summers to Buffy the Vampire Slayer in its fifth season, whose sudden contradictory presence is initially unquestioned by the other characters. It received positive reception from critics, who praised the premise and writing. The episode has since been widely regarded as one of the series' best by both fans and critics alike. The debuting character Mr. Poopybutthole recurs in future episodes and web specials, and a card game of the episode was released. Two April Fools' Day events by Adult Swim (in 2021 and 2022) make edits to the episode. While the episode was inspired by the previously mentioned Buffy the Vampire Slayer, the title is a reference to the 1990 movie Total Recall.

== Plot ==
At dinner in the Smith family, Jerry's brother Uncle Steve gets him plane tickets as thanks for letting him stay with them for the past year. Rick arrives and shoots "Steve", whose form as a parasite is exposed as he dies. Rick says that it is a creature from a species that multiplies by implanting false memories in people's heads, Jerry never having had a brother. Rick says that there should only be six people in the household—himself, Morty, Summer, Beth, Jerry and Mr. Poopybutthole, the last of whom is a small yellow creature with a tall head.

Rick seals the house from intruders with a blast shield as Mr. Poopybutthole reminds the family of a memory with Cousin Nicky, who then appears in the room. Rick shoots him after looking at a sign he made of the six true family members. However, the family continue to have collective flashbacks to false memories with new characters, all parasites, who arrive in the room. One such parasite—Sleepy Gary, who the family believe is Beth's husband—talks to Jerry about a memory of the two of them kissing.

The sitting room is now filled with parasites, along with the Smith family. They try to convince Rick to lower the house's defenses before beginning to persuade the others that Rick is a parasite. Several of them attack Rick and steal his watch in order to lower the house's blast shield. Morty takes Rick to the garage and is about to shoot him, convinced that he is a parasite, when he realizes how to tell parasites apart from genuine family members. The parasites are only able to implant happy memories, and Morty has many unpleasant memories with Rick.

Using this method of deduction, Rick and Morty slowly take out parasites one by one in the living room. Negative memories involving Summer and Beth prove their honesty. Beth kills Sleepy Gary, which leaves Jerry suicidal, but Beth realizes he is real. With the last parasites eliminated, the six original household members sit down for dinner. Beth, suspicious that she has no negative memories of Mr. Poopybutthole, shoots him. However, he is real and severely injured by the shot.

In a post-credits scene, the Smith family watch Mr. Poopybutthole in physical therapy; he tells a nurse to pass the message onto a guilt-stricken Beth that he is sorry she had no negative memories of him.

== Production ==
According to writer Ryan Ridley, the episode is named after Total Recall (1990), a science fiction film that features false memory implantation, but was conceived by Mike McMahan with reference to the fifth season of Buffy the Vampire Slayer. In this season, the character Dawn Summers is introduced and treated by other characters as if she has always been present; a supernatural reason for this is eventually given. Another writer suggested this was a good format for a clip show spoof, where flashbacks would be essential to the plot. Mr. Poopybutthole was originally Bullet Boy, a character resembling a bullet, and was informed by creator Justin Roiland's prior design sketch of a character called Titty Longballs.

Justin Roiland said that the parasite infestation originates from rocks that Rick is seen collecting two episodes earlier, in "Mortynight Run". A pink blob—the parasite pod—can be seen on a rock in "Mortynight Run", and Rick bins the rocks at the start of "Total Rickall". One flashback shows Rick about to bulk purchase limited edition The Legend of Zelda-themed Nintendo 3DS consoles, with the plan to resell them at a higher price. This was based on Roiland doing this several years earlier—shortly before the December 2013 premiere of the pilot episode—but he still had a number of consoles unsold. In 2018, he sold one of them online alongside a handdrawn picture of Rick and Morty.

A clay animation special released in 2017 depicts Mr. Poopybutthole as traumatized after Beth shot him, and worried that he will not be able to resume his pommel horse practice. A web special released at the end of season three shows Mr. Poopybutthole looking through a scrapbook of his life, including significant life events involving his wife and child. On April Fools' Day 2021, Adult Swim rebranded themselves as Adult Swim Junior and debuted a redubbed version of "Total Rickall" where the voice actors were children. A new opening credits sequence showed the main characters as babies and some of the dialogue, such as profanity, was adapted, with Mr. Poopybutthole renamed to Mr. Poopybuttbutt. A third version debuted for the next year's April Fools' Day as one of a series of altered shows with glitches related to Learning with Pibby, a proof-of-concept short produced by Cartoon Network Studios that was released on Adult Swim's YouTube channel in October 2021.

The party game Rick and Morty: Total Rickall Card Game adapts characters from the episode into roles for each player. A number of players are imposters and the remaining characters aim to identify and eliminate these imposters.

== Analysis ==
The episode's plot resembles the film The Thing, wherein a parasitic life form causes a group of researchers to doubt each other's existence. It is similar to another television episode that Harmon worked on—Community's "Paradigms of Human Memory"—in which characters' flashbacks show unseen content. A similar premise can be seen in an episode of Clerks: The Animated Series as well as the Torchwood episode "Adam". Corey Plante of Inverse wrote that the improvisational style resembled the episodes "Rixty Minutes" and "Interdimensional Cable 2: Tempting Fate", but that it was most similar to "Morty's Mind Blowers" because it is a clip show of flashbacks. Plante highlighted that "Total Rickall" is one of the earliest points at which Morty is the one to solve the difficult situation the characters are in. With one main storyline and a setting confined to the Smith household, the episode is more limited in scope than others.

In the opening titles, Mr. Poopybutthole can be seen inserted into each title sequence. Subsequent to this episode, Mr. Poopybutthole reappears a number of times in post-credits scenes. Creator Dan Harmon proposed that Mr. Poopybutthole could be an advanced creature who survives by taking advantage of the holes in people's memories that the parasites leave, and that this could explain his ability to break the fourth wall. MatPat, on his YouTube channel The Film Theorists, proposed that Mr. Poopybutthole is a version of Morty from an alternate universe. He cites as evidence details from Mr. Poopybutthole's scrapbook in the web special.

Jerry's love for Sleepy Gary led to fan speculation about his sexuality. In the season five episode "Mort Dinner Rick Andre", Jerry similarly expresses sexual interest in a male character—relishing the possibility of a threesome with his wife and Mr. Nimbus.

== Reception ==
The episode first aired on Adult Swim on August 16, 2015, where it was watched by 1.96 million viewers.

Inverse's Corey Plante reviewed that the episode manages to incorporate each of the best aspects of Rick and Morty, particularly praising the cold opening and Sleepy Gary's character as humorous and Beth shooting Mr. Poopybutthole as "unforgettable". Commenting on Morty's revelation that a character is real if he shares negative memories with them, Plante said that "this thoughtful commentary on the messiness of life and family is universally relatable". Jesse Schedeen of IGN rated the episode 8.3 out of 10, praising that the premise allowed each flashback to have plot relevance, and that watching the Smith family try to work out if each other was real was funny. Schedeen approved of the large number of guest voice actors, particularly Keith David as Reverse Giraffe, but criticized the ending for not giving more significant focus to the "emotional fallout of having years of cherished memories revealed to be false and hollow". Zack Handlen of The A.V. Club, who gave the episode an A, similarly praised the premise, along with the rapid pace of the episode and lack of a distracting subplot.

A number of critics found "Total Rickall" one of the strongest episodes of television in 2015, including David Sims of The Atlantic, Alec Bojalad of Den of Geek and Steve Greene of IndieWire.
