= List of Rick and Morty episodes =

Rick and Morty is an American animated science fiction sitcom created by Justin Roiland and Dan Harmon. The series follows Rick Sanchez, an alcoholic, nihilistic mad scientist, and his easily distressed grandson, Morty Smith as they travel to parallel dimensions and exotic planets with extraterrestrials. These adventures commonly cause trouble for Morty's family (Jerry, Beth, and Summer), who are often dragged along as well.

The series premiered on December 2, 2013, on Cartoon Network's late-night programming block Adult Swim. On May 10, 2018, Adult Swim announced a long-term deal with the creators, ordering 70 new episodes of Rick and Morty, through to a tenth season. At a New York Comic Con panel in 2024, it was announced that the series had been renewed for an additional two seasons, renewing the show through season 12.

The ninth season premiered on May 24, 2026. As of July 26, 2026, 91 episodes of Rick and Morty have aired, currently in its ninth season.

== Series overview ==
Season	Episodes	Originally released	
Season	Episodes	First released	Last released
1	11	December 2, 2013	April 14, 2014
2	10	July 26, 2015	October 4, 2015
3	10	April 1, 2017 (Note: The third season of Rick and Morty premiered unannounced on April 1, 2017. The remaining episodes began airing weekly on July 30, 2017.)	October 1, 2017
4	10	November 10, 2019	May 31, 2020
5	10	June 20, 2021	September 5, 2021
6	10	September 4, 2022	December 11, 2022
7	10	October 15, 2023	December 17, 2023
8	10	May 25, 2025	July 27, 2025
9	10	May 24, 2026	July 26, 2026

== Episodes ==
=== Season 1 (2013–14) ===
No. overall	No. in season	Title	Directed by	Written by	Original release date	U.S. viewers (millions)
1	1	"Pilot"	Justin Roiland	Dan Harmon & Justin Roiland	December 2, 2013	1.10
2	2	"Lawnmower Dog"	John Rice	Ryan Ridley	December 9, 2013	1.51
3	3	"Anatomy Park"	John Rice	Eric Acosta & Wade Randolph	December 16, 2013	1.30
4	4	"M. Night Shaym-Aliens!"	Jeff Myers	Tom Kauffman	January 13, 2014	1.32
5	5	"Meeseeks and Destroy"	Bryan Newton	Ryan Ridley	January 20, 2014	1.61
6	6	"Rick Potion #9"	Stephen Sandoval	Justin Roiland	January 27, 2014	1.75
7	7	"Raising Gazorpazorp"	Jeff Myers	Eric Acosta & Wade Randolph	March 10, 2014	1.76
8	8	"Rixty Minutes"	Bryan Newton	Tom Kauffman & Justin Roiland	March 17, 2014	1.48
9	9	"Something Ricked This Way Comes"	John Rice	Mike McMahan	March 24, 2014	1.54
10	10	"Close Rick-counters of the Rick Kind"	Stephen Sandoval	Ryan Ridley	April 7, 2014	1.75
11	11	"Ricksy Business"	Stephen Sandoval	Ryan Ridley & Tom Kauffman	April 14, 2014	2.13

=== Season 2 (2015) ===
No. overall	No. in season	Title	Directed by	Written by	Original release date	U.S. viewers (millions)
12	1	"A Rickle in Time"	Wes Archer	Matt Roller	July 26, 2015	2.12
13	2	"Mortynight Run"	Dominic Polcino	David Phillips	August 2, 2015	2.19
14	3	"Auto Erotic Assimilation"	Bryan Newton	Ryan Ridley	August 9, 2015	1.94
15	4	"Total Rickall"	Juan Meza-León	Mike McMahan	August 16, 2015	1.96
16	5	"Get Schwifty"	Wes Archer	Tom Kauffman	August 23, 2015	2.12
17	6	"The Ricks Must Be Crazy"	Dominic Polcino	Dan Guterman	August 30, 2015	1.91
18	7	"Big Trouble in Little Sanchez"	Bryan Newton	Alex Rubens	September 13, 2015	1.97
19	8	"Interdimensional Cable 2: Tempting Fate"	Juan Meza-León	Dan Guterman, Ryan Ridley & Justin Roiland	September 20, 2015	1.79
20	9	"Look Who's Purging Now"	Dominic Polcino	Dan Harmon, Ryan Ridley & Justin Roiland	September 27, 2015	1.89
21	10	"The Wedding Squanchers"	Wes Archer	Tom Kauffman	October 4, 2015	1.84

=== Season 3 (2017) ===
No. overall	No. in season	Title	Directed by	Written by	Original release date	U.S. viewers (millions)
22	1	"The Rickshank Rickdemption"	Juan Meza-León	Mike McMahan	April 1, 2017	0.68 (Note: This episode premiered unannounced and re-ran for four hours straight with improving ratings. This is the viewership of only the first broadcast of the episode.)
23	2	"Rickmancing the Stone"	Dominic Polcino	Jane Becker	July 30, 2017	2.86
24	3	"Pickle Rick"	Anthony Chun	Jessica Gao	August 6, 2017	2.31
25	4	"Vindicators 3: The Return of Worldender"	Bryan Newton	Sarah Carbiener & Erica Rosbe	August 13, 2017	2.66
26	5	"The Whirly Dirly Conspiracy"	Juan Meza-León	Ryan Ridley	August 20, 2017	2.29
27	6	"Rest and Ricklaxation"	Anthony Chun	Tom Kauffman	August 27, 2017	2.47
28	7	"The Ricklantis Mixup" (Note: An alternate title used for this episode is "Tales from the Citadel".)	Dominic Polcino	Dan Guterman & Ryan Ridley	September 10, 2017	2.38
29	8	"Morty's Mind Blowers"	Bryan Newton	Mike McMahan, James Siciliano, Ryan Ridley, Dan Guterman, Justin Roiland & Dan Harmon	September 17, 2017	2.51
30	9	"The ABC's of Beth"	Juan Meza-León	Mike McMahan	September 24, 2017	2.49
31	10	"The Rickchurian Mortydate"	Anthony Chun	Dan Harmon	October 1, 2017	2.60

=== Season 4 (2019–20) ===
No. overall	No. in season	Title	Directed by	Written by	Original release date	U.S. viewers (millions)
32	1	"Edge of Tomorty: Rick Die Rickpeat"	Erica Hayes	Mike McMahan	November 10, 2019	2.33
33	2	"The Old Man and the Seat"	Jacob Hair	Michael Waldron	November 17, 2019	1.67
34	3	"One Crew over the Crewcoo's Morty"	Bryan Newton	Caitie Delaney	November 24, 2019	1.61
35	4	"Claw and Hoarder: Special Ricktim's Morty"	Anthony Chun	Jeff Loveness	December 8, 2019	1.63
36	5	"Rattlestar Ricklactica"	Jacob Hair	James Siciliano	December 15, 2019	1.32
37	6	"Never Ricking Morty"	Erica Hayes	Jeff Loveness	May 3, 2020	1.55
38	7	"Promortyus"	Bryan Newton	Jeff Loveness	May 10, 2020	1.34
39	8	"The Vat of Acid Episode"	Jacob Hair	Jeff Loveness & Albro Lundy	May 17, 2020	1.26
40	9	"Childrick of Mort"	Kyounghee Lim	James Siciliano	May 24, 2020	1.22
41	10	"Star Mort Rickturn of the Jerri"	Erica Hayes	Anne Lane	May 31, 2020	1.30

=== Season 5 (2021) ===
No. overall	No. in season	Title	Directed by	Written by	Original release date	U.S. viewers (millions)
42	1	"Mort Dinner Rick Andre"	Jacob Hair	Jeff Loveness	June 20, 2021	1.30
43	2	"Mortyplicity"	Lucas Gray	Albro Lundy	June 27, 2021	1.16
44	3	"A Rickconvenient Mort"	Juan Meza-Léon	Rob Schrab	July 4, 2021	1.01
45	4	"Rickdependence Spray"	Erica Hayes	Nick Rutherford	July 11, 2021	0.96
46	5	"Amortycan Grickfitti"	Kyounghee Lim	Anne Lane	July 18, 2021	0.78
47	6	"Rick & Morty's Thanksploitation Spectacular"	Douglas Einar Olsen	James Siciliano	July 25, 2021	0.93
48	7	"Gotron Jerrysis Rickvangelion"	Jacob Hair	John Harris	August 1, 2021 (Note: This episode was accidentally released on Amazon Prime Video in Canada on July 13, 2021, before being removed.)	0.82
49	8	"Rickternal Friendshine of the Spotless Mort"	Erica Hayes	Albro Lundy	August 8, 2021	0.83
50	9	"Forgetting Sarick Mortshall"	Kyounghee Lim	Siobhan Thompson	September 5, 2021	0.91
51	10	"Rickmurai Jack"	Jacob Hair	Jeff Loveness & Scott Marder	September 5, 2021	0.94

=== Season 6 (2022) ===
No. overall	No. in season	Title	Directed by	Written by	Original release date	U.S. viewers (millions)
52	1	"Solaricks"	Jacob Hair	Albro Lundy	September 4, 2022	0.66
53	2	"Rick: A Mort Well Lived"	Kyounghee Lim	Alex Rubens	September 11, 2022	0.60
54	3	"Bethic Twinstinct"	Douglas Einar Olsen	Anne Lane	September 18, 2022	0.55
55	4	"Night Family"	Jacob Hair	Rob Schrab	September 25, 2022	0.60
56	5	"Final DeSmithation"	Douglas Einar Olsen	Heather Anne Campbell	October 2, 2022	0.58
57	6	"Juricksic Mort"	Kyounghee Lim	Nick Rutherford	October 9, 2022	0.54
58	7	"Full Meta Jackrick"	Lucas Gray	Alex Rubens	November 20, 2022	0.51
59	8	"Analyze Piss"	Fill Marc Sagadraca	James Siciliano	November 27, 2022	0.53
60	9	"A Rick in King Mortur's Mort"	Jacob Hair	Anne Lane	December 4, 2022	0.53
61	10	"Ricktional Mortpoon's Rickmas Mortcation"	Kyounghee Lim	Scott Marder	December 11, 2022	0.49

=== Season 7 (2023) ===
No. overall	No. in season	Title	Directed by	Written by	Original release date	U.S. viewers (millions)
62	1	"How Poopy Got His Poop Back"	Lucas Gray	Nick Rutherford	October 15, 2023	0.42
63	2	"The Jerrick Trap"	Kyounghee Lim	Albro Lundy & James Siciliano	October 22, 2023	0.47
64	3	"Air Force Wong"	Jacob Hair	Alex Rubens	October 29, 2023	0.36
65	4	"That's Amorte"	Lucas Gray	Heather Anne Campbell	November 5, 2023	0.44
66	5	"Unmortricken"	Jacob Hair	Albro Lundy & James Siciliano	November 12, 2023	0.46
67	6	"Rickfending Your Mort"	Jacob Hair	Cody Ziglar	November 19, 2023	0.40
68	7	"Wet Kuat Amortican Summer"	Kyounghee Lim	Alex Song-Xia	November 26, 2023	0.49
69	8	"Rise of the Numbericons: The Movie"	Lucas Gray	Rob Schrab	December 3, 2023	0.38
70	9	"Mort: Ragnarick"	Kyounghee Lim	Jeremy Gilfor & Scott Marder	December 10, 2023	0.29
71	10	"Fear No Mort"	Eugene Huang	Heather Anne Campbell	December 17, 2023	0.45

=== Season 8 (2025) ===
No. overall	No. in season	Title	Directed by	Written by	Original release date	U.S. viewers (millions)
72	1	"Summer of All Fears"	Fill Marc Sagadraca	Jess Lacher	May 25, 2025	0.30
73	2	"Valkyrick"	Jacob Hair	Scott Marder	June 1, 2025	0.47
74	3	"The Rick, The Mort & The Ugly"	Brian Kaufman	Albro Lundy, James Siciliano & Michael Kellner	June 8, 2025	0.33
75	4	"The Last Temptation of Jerry"	Douglas Einar Olsen	Heather Anne Campbell	June 15, 2025	0.38
76	5	"Cryo Mort a Rickver"	Fill Marc Sagadraca	Nick Rutherford	June 22, 2025	N/A
77	6	"The Curicksous Case of Bethjamin Button"	Eugene Huang	Heather Anne Campbell & Jess Lacher	June 29, 2025	N/A
78	7	"Ricker than Fiction"	Douglas Einar Olsen	Rob Schrab	July 6, 2025	N/A
79	8	"Nomortland"	Fill Marc Sagadraca	Albro Lundy & James Siciliano	July 13, 2025	N/A
80	9	"Morty Daddy"	Eugene Huang	Beth Stelling	July 20, 2025	N/A
81	10	"Hot Rick"	Brian Kaufman	Albro Lundy & James Siciliano	July 27, 2025	N/A

=== Season 9 (2026) ===
No. overall	No. in season	Title	Directed by	Written by	Original release date	U.S. viewers (millions)
82	1	"There's Something About Morty"	Douglas Einar Olsen	Albro Lundy	May 24, 2026	N/A
83	2	"Ricks Days, Seven Nights"	Brian Kaufman	Jess Lacher	May 31, 2026	N/A
84	3	"Rick Fu Hustle"	Daniel Cole & Fill Marc Sagadraca	Rob Schrab	June 7, 2026	N/A
85	4	"A Ricker Runs Through It"	Fill Marc Sagadraca & Daniel Cole	Story by : Nick Rutherford; Teleplay by : Jax Ball & Albro Lundy	June 14, 2026	N/A
86	5	"Jer Bud"	Brian Kaufman	James Siciliano	June 21, 2026	N/A
87	6	"Erickerhead"	Eugene Huang	Albro Lundy & Scott Marder	June 28, 2026	N/A
88	7	"MortGully: The Last Rickforest"	Daniel Cole	Michael Kellner	July 5, 2026	N/A
89	8	"Rickuiem Mort a Dream"	Douglas Einar Olsen	Heather Anne Campbell	July 12, 2026	N/A
90	9	"Salute Your Morts"	Brian Kaufman	Garrick Bernard	July 19, 2026	N/A
91	10	"Field of Dreams"	Eugene Huang	Heather Anne Campbell & Jess Lacher	July 26, 2026	N/A

== Ratings ==
Rick and Morty : U.S. viewers per episode (millions)

Season	Episode number											Average
Season	1	2	3	4	5	6	7	8	9	10	11	Average
1	1.10	1.51	1.30	1.32	1.61	1.75	1.76	1.48	1.54	1.75	2.13	1.57
2	2.12	2.19	1.94	1.96	2.12	1.91	1.97	1.79	1.89	1.84	–	1.97
3	0.68	2.86	2.31	2.66	2.29	2.47	2.38	2.51	2.49	2.60	–	2.33
4	2.33	1.67	1.61	1.63	1.32	1.55	1.34	1.26	1.22	1.30	–	1.52
5	1.30	1.16	1.01	0.96	0.78	0.93	0.82	0.83	0.91	0.94	–	0.96
6	0.66	0.60	0.55	0.60	0.58	0.54	0.51	0.53	0.53	0.49	–	0.56
7	0.42	0.47	0.36	0.44	0.46	0.40	0.49	0.38	0.29	0.45	–	0.42
8	0.30	0.47	0.33	0.38	TBD	TBD	TBD	TBD	TBD	TBD	–	TBD

Audience measurement performed by Nielsen Media Research (Note: The viewership statistics in the graph and table are sourced from the citations in the season-specific tables above.)

== Other media ==
=== Anime ===
A six-minute short film titled Samurai & Shogun aired unannounced on Adult Swim's Toonami programming block on March 29, 2020, (Note: Broadcast night of March 28th.) during the hiatus of the fourth season of Rick and Morty, before being uploaded to Adult Swim's YouTube channel the following day. Written and directed by Kaichi Sato, and produced by Koji Iijima and Studio Deen and executive producer Maki Terashima-Furuta, the episode features a different animation and art style than usual, and is heavily themed around anime, specifically Lone Wolf & Cub. The short stars Yōhei Tadano as "Rick WTM-72" and Keisuke Chiba as "Shogun Morty", the pair reprising their roles from the Japanese dub of the animated series.

Another eight-minute short film titled Rick and Morty vs. Genocider aired unannounced on Toonami on July 26, 2020, (Note: Broadcast night of July 25th.) debuting on YouTube slightly after. Written and directed by Takashi Sano, produced by Sola Entertainment, animated at Telecom Animation Film, and starring Tadano and Chiba as Rick and Morty, Manabu Muraji as Jerry, "AI Driver", and "Hologram Transvestite", and Yuki Minami as "Hologram Girl", the episode explores the conflict between President Morty and Rick C-137.

A third short film, titled Summer Meets God (Rick Meets Evil) and also written and directed by Takashi Sano, was released on YouTube on August 2, 2021 and aired on Adult Swim the following day. A fourth short film, titled The Great Yokai Battle of Akihabara, directed by Masaru Matsumoto and written by Naohiro Fukushima, was released on YouTube on October 10, 2021 and aired on Adult Swim the following day. A fifth short film, titled Samurai and Shogun Part 2 and featuring the return of Samurai & Shogun's Kaichi Sato as writer and director, was released on YouTube on November 12, 2021 as part of the 2021 Adult Swim Festival.

=== Webisodes ===
==== The Non-Canonical Adventures (2016–2021) ====
On October 26, 2016, Adult Swim began releasing a web series of claymation shorts, Rick and Morty: The Non-Canonical Adventures. Written and directed by Lee Hardcastle, the shorts follow Rick and Morty characters into parodies of scenes from various science-fiction and horror films. The title of each short is the same as that of the film the short is parodying, and each episode ends with the Adult Swim logo [as] integrated in the scene. On November 1, 2019, Hardcastle released a video compiling all the shorts, while also releasing the last ten previously unreleased shorts. Additional shorts were later released in 2021.

No.	Title	Original release date
1	"The Thing"	October 26, 2016
Parodying the 1982 film of the same name, the Smith family, with the exception of Rick, is tied up, with Rick holding a flame thrower. There are four vials on the table containing blood of each member of the family. Rick begins to test everyone's blood with a heated piece of copper wire, starting with Jerry whose blood flees from the hot wire.
2	"The Fly"	October 26, 2016
Parodying the 1986 film of the same name, Rick turns on an unknown portal and informs Morty that they will be the "ultimate family". His face then falls off revealing a head resembling that of a fly. Morty screams "No!" as the episode ends.
3	"Honey I Shrunk the Kids"	October 26, 2016
Parodying the 1989 film of the same name, a shrunken Morty has fallen into a bowl of milk and cereal. Morty screams at Rick, who is planning to eat the cereal, to not eat him. However, Rick doesn't hear Morty, unintentionally eating him while talking to Snuffles, their dog.
4	"Ex Machina"	October 27, 2016
Parodying the 2015 film of the same name, Morty inquires as to Rick's location with Jessica. "Drunk Rick" shows up from behind him, and says that although he is wasting his time talking to her, he wouldn't be wasting his time dancing with her. Rick proceeds to turn on music and lights, and begins dancing with Jessica as Morty watches them. In this episode, Morty Smith replaces Caleb Smith, Rick Sanchez replaces Nathan Bateman and Jessica replaces Kyoko.
5	"Halloween"	November 3, 2016
Parodying the 1978 film of the same name, Morty is hiding in a closet from an unspecified assailant. The person begins making a hole in one of the doors of the closet. When the hole is big enough, the person sticks their head inside, revealing Rick wearing a Michael Myers mask. The episode adapts a scene from Halloween wherein Laurie Strode is attacked in identical circumstances by Myers wearing a painted mask of James T. Kirk.
6	"2001: A Space Odyssey"	July 8, 2017
Parodying the 1968 film of the same name, Morty is seen in a Space Shuttle wearing a space suit. He asks Rick to open the shuttle door. Rick instead says that he can't do that; after Morty asks him as to the problem Rick replies that their conversation can serve no purpose and proceeds to say "Goodbye" to Morty in multiple languages.
7	"Blade Runner"	July 11, 2017
Parodying the 1982 film of the same name, Rick attacks Morty and pushes him to a pillar. He grabs him and prepares to kill him, but is suddenly shot in the head. Morty looks at the person who shot Rick to find it to be Jessica. As Morty looks at Jessica, the neon sign to the left lights up, revealing the Adult Swim logo. In this short, adapting a scene from Blade Runner, Morty Smith takes the place of Rick Deckard, Rick Sanchez takes the place of Leon Kowalski and Jessica takes the place of Rachael.
8	"Poltergeist"	July 11, 2017
Parodying the 1982 film of the same name, Morty suddenly spots a "Clown Rick" at his door, while lying in his bed. Trying to sleep, but hearing honking, he looks to where Rick was to find him gone. Rick suddenly shows up by his side, grabs Morty and drags him under his bed, laughing hysterically. The episode adapts a scene from Poltergeist when Robbie is attacked in his bedroom by a clown doll.
9	"Re-Animator"	July 11, 2017
Parodying the 1985 film of the same name, Rick has Morty's severed head on a table. Connecting it to machinery, he manages to wake him up and attempts to talk with him. Morty, realizing his predicament, angrily yells "You bastard!" and, controlling his body, approaches Rick from behind and knocks him out.
10	"Aliens"	July 11, 2017
Parodying the 1986 film of the same name, Morty is about to be attacked by a xenomorph queen. Jerry, robotic in nature as well as legless, is seen to be in agony nearby. Suddenly, the door of the elevator opens, revealing a drunk Rick in a power loader, determined to take on the queen; he instead passes out and falls over, crushing the legless robotic Jerry. The episode parodies the climax of Aliens, with Rick Sanchez taking the role of Ellen Ripley, Morty taking the role of Newt, and Jerry taking the role of Bishop.
11	"E.T. the Extra-Terrestrial"	July 11, 2017
Parodying the 1982 film of the same name, E.T. Rick takes cans of beer from Fridge and drinks them. At the same time, Morty, telepathically connected to E.T. Rick, is seen in a classroom being affected by the alcohol that Rick consumes. Upon trying to leave the Kitchen, E.T. Rick passes out; at the same time Morty vomits upon his desk.
12	"Gremlins"	July 11, 2017
Parodying the 1984 film of the same name, an incredibly injured Morty is seen sitting beside Gizmo on a Couch. Rick shows up and places money on the couch, holding up a cage intended for Gizmo as Morty accepts the money. The episode parodies the conclusion of Gremlins, with Rick taking place of Mr. Wing and Morty taking place of Billy.
13	"A Clockwork Orange"	July 27, 2017
Parodying the 1971 film of the same name, Rick is drinking with Birdperson, Mr. Meeseeks and Mr. Poopybutthole, surrounded by furniture and statues of Morty.
14	"Body Snatchers"	July 27, 2017
Parodying the 1978 film Invasion of the Body Snatchers, Rick is seen fixing a television as Morty enters the room. A picture of Mr. Poopybutthole is on the wall behind him. Looking at each other, Rick points to Morty and starts emitting a piercing scream, shocking Morty. The screen turns to black then white as the Adult Swim logo hatches from a nearby pod.
15	"The Matrix"	July 28, 2017
Parodying the 1999 film of the same name, Morty is on a roof of a building when Rick shows up in front of him. Rick pulls out a weapon and begins to shoot at Morty. Morty successfully avoids most of the bullets in slow-motion until one of them enters Morty's head through his sunglasses, causing Morty to fall off of the roof as it begins to rain. In this episode, a parody of a scene from The Matrix, Morty takes the place of Neo while Rick takes the place of Agent Smith.
16	"Ghostbusters"	July 30, 2017
Parodying the 1984 film of the same name, Morty, employed as a Ghostbuster, walks through a hotel corridor and spots a ghost of Rick, who glides quickly towards him. Morty hides his face behind hands as Rick slimes him. Morty takes the place of Peter Venkman in this parody while Rick takes the place of Slimer.
17	"Beetlejuice"	November 1, 2019
18	"The Blair Witch Project"	November 1, 2019
19	"Evil Dead 2"	November 1, 2019
20	"Hellraiser"	November 1, 2019
21	"Home Alone"	November 1, 2019
22	"Jaws"	November 1, 2019
23	"Predator"	November 1, 2019
24	"Reservoir Dogs"	November 1, 2019
25	"Terminator 2"	November 1, 2019
26	"Videodrome"	November 1, 2019
27	"Pulp Fiction"	January 1, 2021
28	"Godzilla vs Kong"	January 1, 2021
29	"Hostel"	January 1, 2021
30	"Hobo with a Shotgun"	January 1, 2021
31	"Hereditary"	January 1, 2021
32	"My Neighbour Totoro"	January 1, 2021
33	"Stand by Me"	January 1, 2021
34	"Soylent Green"	January 1, 2021
35	"Tremors"	January 1, 2021
36	"Indiana Jones and the Temple of Doom"	January 1, 2021

==== Other webisodes ====
Title	Directed by	Written by	Original release date
"Bushworld Adventures"	Michael Cusack	Michael Cusack	April 1, 2018
Rick and Morty travel to Bendigo in search of the Green Cube. Along the way, they encounter an overly helpful convenience store clerk, Jerry posing as a Bush Wizard, goblins who live in a wombat hole, and "Uncle Barry", a giant with dementia who forms an instant bond with Rick. An eleven-minute episode titled "Bushworld Adventures" aired unannounced on Adult Swim on April 1, 2018, one year after the surprise premiere of the third season of Rick and Morty, as part of Adult Swim's annual April Fools' prank. Written, directed and produced by Australian animator and YouTube personality Michael Cusack, the episode features a different animation and art style than usual, and is heavily themed around Australian humor.
"Rick + Morty in the Eternal Nightmare Machine"	Paul Robertson	Paul Robertson	April 30, 2021
"Summer's Sleepover"	Lee Hardcastle	Lee Hardcastle	October 31, 2022

==== Vindicators 2 (2022) ====
On May 20, 2021, Adult Swim announced a short spin-off series entitled The Vindicators was in development, alongside spin-offs from other Adult Swim shows like Aqua Teen Hunger Force, Robot Chicken, and Your Pretty Face Is Going to Hell. The ten-episode series premiered on Adult Swim's YouTube channel—each episode runs between two and three minutes. The series centers on the characters Supernova, Vance Maximus, Alan Rails, Crocubot, Million Ants, and Noob Noob previously introduced in the Season 3 episode "Vindicators 3: The Return of Worldender". Each episode is written by Sarah Carbiener and Erica Rosbe, and directed by Maite Garcia. The series is produced by Atomic Cartoons.

=== Animatic scene ===
In August 2016, Adult Swim posted an "animatic" scene entitled State of Georgia Vs. Denver Fenton Allen on YouTube. This consisted of the voices of Rick and Morty reenacting a transcript of a real-life court case of the same name. The visual animation consisted of only basic, black-and-white sketches. In October 2016, a fan-made fully-animated production version of the scene was released on YouTube, with the title Judge Morty: State of Georgia Vs. Rick Allen. It was later blocked by Turner on copyright grounds, but many fans have since reuploaded the video online.
