= Nathan Bateman =

Nathan Bateman may refer to:

- Nathan Bateman, character in Ex Machina (film)
- Nathan Bateman, character in List of Rick and Morty episodes
