= Morty's Mind Blowers =

- Rick and Morty episode
- Episode no.: Season 3 Episode 8
- Directed by: Bryan Newton
- Written by: Mike McMahan; James Siciliano; Ryan Ridley; Dan Guterman; Justin Roiland; Dan Harmon
- Original air date: September 17, 2017
- Running time: 22 minutes

Guest appearances
- Jonah Briedis as Zick Zack; Maurice LaMarche as Gordon Lunas; Phil Hendrie as Gene Vagina; Kari Wahlgren as Jessica; Amy Sedaris as Jodie

Episode chronology
← Previous "The Ricklantis Mixup"	Next → "The ABC's of Beth"
- Rick and Morty (season 3)

"Morty's Mind Blowers" is the eighth episode of the third season of the American science fiction television series Rick and Morty. It follows the two titular characters, both voiced by Justin Roiland, as they experiment with Morty's lost memories. The episode was directed by Bryan Newton and written by various screenwriters, including Mike McMahan, who would later serve as a producer on the fourth season, and both series creators Roiland and Dan Harmon. "Morty's Mind Blowers" originally aired on Adult Swim on September 17, 2017, and was watched by 2.51 million viewers. A comic sequel of the same name, written by Kyle Starks, Tini Howard, Sarah Graley, Benjamin Dewey, and Josh Trujillo, with designs by Angie Knowles and Roiland's personal approval, was published by Oni Press in Rick and Morty #50 on May 29, 2019.

== Plot ==
After Morty requests to have a traumatic memory erased, Rick reveals a room where he has been storing numerous memories removed from Morty's mind. The vignettes include Morty inadvertently driving an innocent man to suicide, tricking a pair of scientists into taking their place in an alien menagerie, and mistakenly dooming an alien's afterlife. He is also shown memories Beth and Summer had removed, where Beth chose to save Summer over Morty without hesitation and one where Morty is choking on a demonic entity and his family mocks him instead of helping him. Eventually it is revealed that the room also contains memories free of any trauma, where Rick was simply left appearing foolish, so he selfishly removed them from Morty's mind. This revelation prompts a fight, resulting in Rick and Morty both having their memories accidentally erased.

Morty scours the memories around him to replace the ones he lost, but he is displeased with the truth he finds and convinces Rick that they should kill themselves. Summer enters the room moments before they commit suicide. At this point, it is revealed that Rick has a contingency plan in place for an occasion such as this. Following written instructions, Summer tranquilizes Rick and Morty, restores their memories, and drags them to the living room, placing them on the couch. Then Summer administers smelling salts to revive Rick and Morty. As they wake up, they're both angry at Summer, believing she allowed them to sleep through several shows on "Interdimensional Cable." In the post-credits scene, Jerry discovers a box labeled "Jerry's Mind Blowers", which contains a memory reminiscent of E.T. the Extra-Terrestrial where Jerry is accidentally responsible for the death of an alien.

== Production ==
The title of "Morty's Mind Blowers" was announced on August 28, 2017. The episode's writing and directorial credits were revealed upon its airing to be Bryan Newton as episode director, and Mike McMahan, James Siciliano, Ryan Ridley, Dan Guterman, Justin Roiland, and Dan Harmon as writers. The series' writers posted on Twitter on September 18, 2017, a day after the airing of the episode, that they had initially come up with "about a hundred mind blowers, then had to narrow it down and vote, then still wrote more."

The episode stars Roiland as Rick Sanchez and Morty Smith, Chris Parnell as Jerry Smith, Sarah Chalke as Beth Smith, and Spencer Grammer as Summer Smith. Jonas Briedis voices Zick Zack, an alien a member of the Floop Floopian race who believes that there is an afterlife. In one of Morty's memories, it is shown that Morty leads Zack to believe that there is no afterlife. While proclaiming that he wants to live, he is killed and dragged to hell by demons. Gordon Lunas, a man Morty drives to kill himself before realizing that Lunas was actually a good person, is voiced by Maurice LaMarche. Phil Hendrie and Kari Wahlgren reprise their roles in the episode as series recurring characters Principal Gene Vagina and Jessica.

== Reception ==
=== Viewing figures ===
The episode was watched upon its air date by 2.51 million American viewers.

=== Critical response ===
The season has an approval rating of 96% from Rotten Tomatoes based on 10 reviews, and an average rating of 8.95 out of 10, with the site's consensus:

Rick and Morty dives into new and even kookier cosmic dilemmas in a third season that interrogates familial bonds, love, and nihilism—treating all existential topics to the series' trademark serrated wit.

Zack Handlen of The A.V. Club praised the episode's uniqueness and the fact that it does not follow a single linear plot like the season premiere, "The Rickshank Rickdemption"; however, the review also noted that the show was "writing itself into a corner." Jesse Schedeen of IGN called the episode "a deep dive into all the horrible adventures Morty would just as soon (and did) forget. The results were amusing, but this episode still lacked the freshness of "Rixty Minutes"." The review, comparing the episode to the season two episode "Interdimensional Cable 2: Tempting Fate", also said it "is more entertaining than another "Interdimensional Cable 2" sequel likely would have been, but it's far from the strongest installment of the season. Nor is it a formula that demands its own sequel." Inverse called the episode "an entertaining alternate to "Interdimensional Cable 2" that's a lot more fun than the random madness of alternate reality television, but these stories actually have an impact on how we perceive the show's main characters," also posing the theory that the episode is set in an alternate universe from the rest of the show with an alternate version of Rick and Morty, as the episode implies that the two characters have "migrated" to a new dimension more than shown in previous episodes.

Den of Geek also compared and contrasted the episode to "Interdimensional Cable 2", saying "each sketch can’t start with a completely blank canvas. Rick and Morty have to be at the center of all of them, which, like the lack of ad-libbing, makes this a lot less of a freewheeling ride" and giving the episode overall 3.5 stars out of 5. In an episode review, Steve Greene of IndieWire said, "For a series that delights in its visual inventiveness, it’s hard to believe that this was the first time “Rick and Morty” ventured into the M.C. Escher zone, barely escaping a logic puzzle architectural trap with their bodies and minds intact."
