= The Harrowing of Hell (comics) =

2020 comic book

Publication information
- Publisher: Iron Circus Comics
- Genre: Biblical fiction
- Publication date: August 2020

Creative team
- Written by: Evan Dahm
- Artist: Evan Dahm

The Harrowing of Hell is a comic book written by Evan Dahm and published by Iron Circus Comics.

== Background ==
The comic book was originally intended to be published in March 2020, but the COVID-19 pandemic pushed back the publication date to July 2020. The story is a retelling of Jesus's descent into hell, otherwise known as the Harrowing of Hell, which was originally depicted in the Gospel of Nicodemus. The story contains flashbacks to Jesus's life as he descends into hell. Throughout the comic book Jesus answers questions with vague responses and an emphasis on storytelling, which leaves his own story open to interpretation. Dahm used brush drawing to illustrate the book and the colors are limited to black, white, and red.

== See also ==
- Judas (comics)
