= Evan Dahm =

American webcartoonist, author of Rice Boy

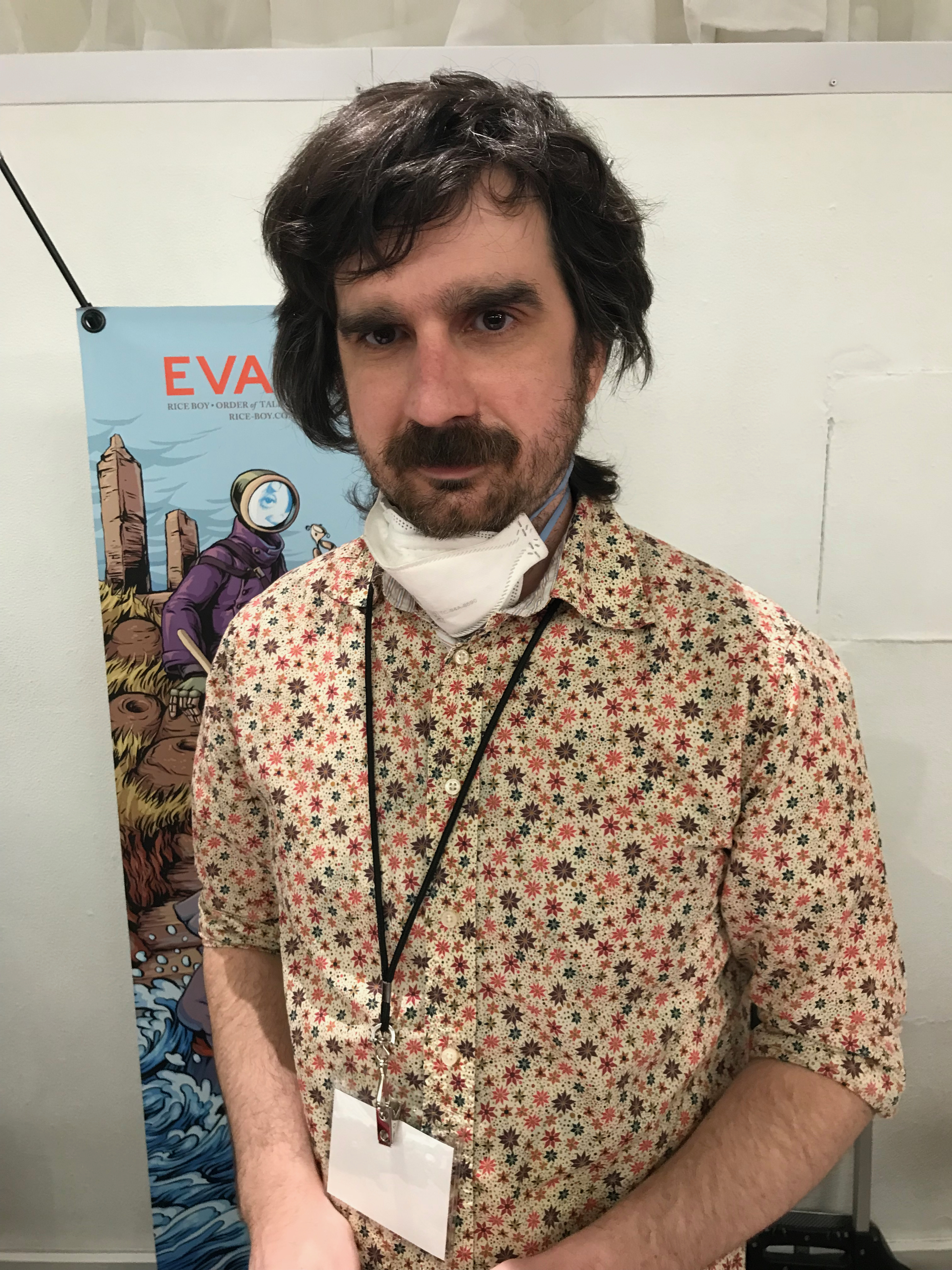
- Dahm at the 2024 MoCCA Festival
- Born: 1987 (age 38–39) North Carolina, U.S.
- Areas: Cartoonist, Artist
- Notable works: Overside webcomics Rice Boy; Vattu; 3rd Voice
- Awards: Ignatz Award (2014); Reuben Award (2023)

Evan Dahm (born 1987) is an American webcartoonist from Asheville, North Carolina known for creating the Overside universe of webcomics. Dahm has also published a number of print-only graphic novels.

== Career ==
Dahm started creating the surrealistic webcomic Rice Boy in 2006, which follows the titular Rice Boy as he travels through Dahm's constructed world. Once Rice Boy was completed in 2008, Dahm followed it up with Order of Tales, a more traditional high fantasy adventure. In 2010, Dahm completed his second story and started Vattu, a webcomic about a tribal girl forced into slavery.

Dahm has written and published a number of books. He collaborated to create the Benign Kingdom series of art books between 2012 and 2016. He published illustrated re-releases of The Wonderful Wizard of Oz and Moby Dick in 2014 and 2018. In 2019, 2021, and 2022, First Second published the Island Book trilogy. Iron Circus Comics published The Harrowing of Hell in 2021 and Last Delivery in 2024. Also in 2024, his illustrations for The Wonderful Wizard of Oz were used in a toki pona translation of the book.

In December 2022, Dahm began publishing 3rd Voice, a fantasy webcomic serial about the adventures of Spondule and Navichet, set in "an invented world in a state of apocalyptic crisis, and the precarious lives of many people therein". In 2024, 3rd Voice was nominated for the Eisner Awards in the category Best Webcomic, and it won the 2023 Divisional Reuben Award for Online Comic Long Form.

== Overside Webcomics ==
Prior to 3rd Voice, the webcomics of Evan Dahm were set on a flat planet named "Overside", which consists of a populated "top" half and a plague-ridden "Underside". Each of the three Overside webcomics tells a unique story, and offers questions and clues about Overside's history and mythology. In 2006, Dahm started the webcomic Rice Boy as an "exercise in surrealism." Described as Dahm's "trippiest" work by ComicsAlliance, Rice Boy introduced readers to Overside through a surreal journey epic. The titular Rice Boy is a simple creature that is torn from his mundane life by an immortal "machine man" called The One Electronic, who suspects that Rice Boy may fulfill an ancient prophecy. The adventure Rice Boy subsequently undertakes is underscored by wistfulness and absurdity. Dahm has stated that he made up the world as he went, designing new characters and conjuring up new features as the story demanded.

After completing Rice Boy in 2008, Evan Dahm went on to create Order of Tales. Presented as a more traditional high fantasy epic, Order of Tales takes place 400 years before the events of Rice Boy and follows the hero Koark, the son of one of the guardians of Overside's most important stories. Order of Tales starts off as Koark's father is murdered and his final act is to bestow the title of "Teller" on his son and command him to find a secret story known as The Ascent of the Bone Ziggurat. Koark meets The One Electronic, who sends him on an errand to an apothecary who may know something about the story. Dahm's character designs for Order of Tales is deliberately simple, as he only used more bizarre figures in order to a sense of intrigue or menace. Lauren Davis described Order of Tales as a classic hero's journey and noted its bittersweet ending.

In 2010, Dahm completed Order of Tales and went on to create Vattu. Taking place before Order of Tales, this webcomic follows the young nomad girl Vattu. When the nomad tribe forcedly joins an expanding empire, Vattu is offered as a slave as a temporary alternative for taxes. Lauren Davis noted that this webcomic starts off slower than Dahm's other works, as "grand prophecies and heroic destinies" are traded in for complex politics and their effects on indigenous tribes. Vattu won the Ignatz Award in the "Outstanding Online Comic" category in 2014.

== Books ==
In 2012, in collaboration with Becky Dreisdadt, Frank Gibson, KC Green, Yuko Ota and Ananth Hirsh, Dahm co-founded a series of art books, titled Benign Kingdom. In this series, Dahm and his colleagues aim to present the works of various webcomic creators specifically. In an interview with ComicsAlliance, Dahm stated that he had difficulty working together with people to get these books published, as he has gotten used to publishing his own work.

In 2014, Evan Dahm illustrated a new edition of L. Frank Baum The Wonderful Wizard of Oz. Funded through a Kickstarter campaign, this edition includes around 100 illustrations, among which are 24 full-page illustrations. In an interview with io9, Dahm stated that he had been thinking of doing illustrations for a public domain book for a while at that point and wanted to create drawings that support the text rather than being the "main thing". Dahm first read the book one or two years before starting the campaign. Dahm noted that the setting is often the most important part of a story to him, and while the places in The Wonderful Wizard of Oz aren't well-described, Dahm stated that capturing the atmosphere of them was a "fun challenge". In 2016, Dahm started a new Kickstarter campaign to give Herman Melville's Moby-Dick a similar treatment, incorporating 53 full-page ink illustrations into the novel.

In 2016, First Second announced to publish a graphic novel by Evan Dahm titled Island Book. This story follows the young girl Sola who leaves her island home in order to find the creature that cursed her. Talking with The A.V. Club, Dahm stated that it is "exciting to start building a new story and a new world from the ground up" after working from the same set universe for a decade. He further noted that he had "been wanting to make a story about a voyage on the high seas for a long time." The book was published in May 2019.

== Style ==
Describing himself as a luddite, Dahm draws his strips by hand and insists that his works are always intended to be seen as printed books rather than as webcomics. Dahm has stated that he prefers the "messiness" of paper over the precision of tablets, feeling like making "mistakes" is part of the process. Dahm doesn't use a large-format image scanner either, instead scanning each page separately and stitching them together with Photoshop. However, he does do coloring digitally.

== Other work ==
In 2020, Dahm developed a Game Boy game with GB Studio titled Usurper Ghoul, which he released on Itch.io.
