= Judas (comics) =

Comic book about Judas Iscariot

Publication information
- Publisher: BOOM! Studios
- Genre: Biblical fiction
- Publication date: September 4, 2018

Creative team
- Written by: Jeff Loveness
- Artist: Jakub Rebelka
- Letterer: Colin Bell

Judas is a comic book mini-series published by BOOM! Studios, written by Jeff Loveness, illustrated by Jakub Rebelka, and lettering done by Colin Bell.

== Background ==
The comic book is a piece of biblical fiction that follows the story of Judas Iscariot. The book focuses on the conflict between free will and predestination. Bible verses are interspersed throughout the book. The four part mini-series was begun in December of 2017 and released its final part before Easter. The story provides a backstory for Judas and provides a motivation for his betrayal of Jesus. Loveness used the Bible and the Gospel of Judas as inspirations for the story.

Part one dives into Judas's reasons for betraying Jesus and shows Judas enter hell after committing suicide. In part two, Judas speaks with Lucifer who explains his reasons for his own actions and why he thinks God has sent various Biblical figures to hell. The series concludes with part four, where Judas finds Jesus in the depths of hell.

== See also ==
- The Harrowing of Hell
