= Jeff Loveness =

American screenwriter and producer

- Occupations: Screenwriter; Television producer; Actor; Comic book writer
- Years active: 2010–present
- Notable work: Jimmy Kimmel Live!; Rick and Morty; Ant-Man and the Wasp: Quantumania

Jeff Loveness is an American screenwriter, television producer, actor, and comic book writer who has worked on the television series Jimmy Kimmel Live! and Rick and Morty, as well as the Marvel Cinematic Universe film Ant-Man and the Wasp: Quantumania (2023).

== Career ==
Loveness graduated from Pepperdine University with a Bachelor of Fine Arts in 2010. He started his career by writing several television episodes for Jimmy Kimmel Live! and Miracle Workers. In March 2015, Loveness wrote a comic series centered around the Marvel Comics character Groot, alongside artist Brian Kesinger. In May 2017, he wrote several comic issues centered around other Marvel characters, including Nova and Spider-Man.

He later gained notability for writing four season four Rick and Morty episodes. Soon after, he was hired by Marvel Studios to write the screenplay for Ant-Man and the Wasp: Quantumania. In December 2020, Loveness revealed that he had turned in the first draft of the script, and said Marvel had used the COVID-19 pandemic break to "do something new and weird" with the film.

He came back in 2021 to write the Rick and Morty season 5 opening episode "Mort Dinner Rick Andre" and the finale, "Rickmurai Jack", which is his final episode of the show. In September 2022, Loveness was hired to work again with Marvel Studios by writing the screenplay for Avengers: The Kang Dynasty, but was later replaced by Michael Waldron, Stephen McFeely, Chris McKenna, and Erik Sommers, who rewrote the film as Avengers: Doomsday (2026).

== Filmography ==
=== Television ===
Year	Title	Credited as			Notes / Ref(s)
Year	Title	Writer	Producer	Actor	Notes / Ref(s)
2010	The Office	No	No	Yes	Episode: "Christening"; Role: Young Adult Ministry Deserter
2010–2011	Onion News Network	Yes	No	No	Episodes: "Excitement Growing Among Beatles Fans for Paul McCartney's Funeral", "Snowlocaust", "Real America", and "American Dream"
2011–2016	Jimmy Kimmel Live!	Yes	No	Yes	238 episodes Roles: Glenn / Shirtless Fighting Pit Dueler / Kristen Wiig's Creepy Date / Audience Jedi
2012	64th Primetime Emmy Awards	Yes	No	No	TV special
2016	68th Primetime Emmy Awards	Yes	No	No	TV special
2017	89th Academy Awards	Yes	No	No	TV special
2019	Miracle Workers	Yes	No	No	Episode: "12 Days"; Story editor for 7 episodes
2019–2022	Rick and Morty	Yes	Yes	Yes	Episodes: "Claw and Hoarder: Special Ricktim's Morty", "Never Ricking Morty", "Promortyus", "The Vat of Acid Episode", "Mort Dinner Rick Andre", and "Rickmurai Jack"; Supervising producer for 19 episodes Role: Japheth's Son, Marvin (voice; 2 episodes)

=== Film ===
Year	Title	Credited as		Notes / Ref(s)
Year	Title	Writer	Other	Notes / Ref(s)
2023	Ant-Man and the Wasp: Quantumania	Yes	No	
2023	Spider-Man: Across the Spider-Verse	No	Yes	Special thanks

== Accolades ==
List of awards and nominations
Award	Date of ceremony	Category	Series	Result	Ref.
Primetime Emmy Award	September 22, 2013	Outstanding Writing for a Variety Series	Jimmy Kimmel Live!	Nominated	
Primetime Emmy Award	September 19, 2020	Outstanding Animated Program	Rick and Morty (for "The Vat of Acid Episode")	Won	
Primetime Emmy Award	September 3, 2022	Outstanding Animated Program	Rick and Morty (for "Mort Dinner Rick Andre")	Nominated	

== Bibliography ==
=== Aftershock Comics ===
- World Reader #1–6

=== Boom! Studios ===
- Judas #1–4
- Strange Skies Over East Berlin #1–4

=== DC Comics ===
- Justice League (vol. 4) #51–52
- Mysteries of Love in Space No. 1 (Lois Lane & Superman: Glasses story)
- Shazam! (vol. 3) No. 12, 15
- Tales from the Dark Multiverse: Death of Superman #1

=== Marvel Comics ===
- Amazing Spider-Man Annual No. 42 (The Many Costumes of Spider-Man story)
- Amazing Spider-Man (vol. 6) No. 6 (Spidey Meets Jimmy story)
- Amazing Spider-Man Special / Inhuman Special / All-New Captain America Special
- Avengers: No More Bullying No. 1 (Weird story)
- Death of Wolverine: Life After Logan No. 1 (You story)
- Groot (vol. 1) #1–6
- Marvel Super Hero Adventures: Captain Marvel – Halloween Spooktacular #1 (Sanctum Spooktorum story)
- Marvel Super Hero Adventures: Spider-Man – Web of Intrigue #1 (The More The Merrier story)
- Miles Morales: Spider-Man No. 30 (The Best Part story, with Phil Lord, Christopher Miller and Kemp Powers)
- Nova (vol. 7) #1–7
- Venom Annual No. 1 (Nobody Does It Better story)
