= Mortyplicity =

- Rick and Morty episode
- Episode no.: Season 5 Episode 2
- Directed by: Lucas Gray
- Written by: Albro Lundy
- Production code: RAM-502
- Original air date: June 27, 2021
- Running time: 22 minutes

Guest appearance
- Keith David as The President

Episode chronology
← Previous "Mort Dinner Rick Andre"	Next → "A Rickconvenient Mort"
- Rick and Morty (season 5)

"Mortyplicity" is the second episode of the fifth season of the Adult Swim animated television series Rick and Morty. It is the 43rd episode of the series overall. Written by Albro Lundy and directed by Lucas Gray, the episode was broadcast on June 27, 2021. The episode was praised by critics for its storyline and fast pacing.

== Plot ==
Rick, Morty, Summer, Beth, and Jerry are having breakfast when alien squids kill them. They are then revealed to be a "decoy family" of robotic duplicates. Rick and his family investigate their deaths, but they too are revealed to be decoys when a third Smith family attacks them. A chaotic series of events erupts. Each Rick decoy, believing himself to be the original Rick, has created more decoy families and seeded them across the country, which have in turn created decoys of their own.

The ensuing "Asimov cascade" has caused all of these decoys to become aware of each other's existence and prompted them to start destroying each other in the belief that coexistence is impossible if even one Rick decoy chooses to kill the others. The decoys eventually learn that the squids are also decoys in disguise, trying to eliminate all other versions of themselves. Elsewhere, the President is alerted to the decoys killing each other, but elects not to get involved.

Subsequent generations of decoys become increasingly crude and strange as the Ricks producing them get lazy. One decoy family is kidnapped by malformed scarecrow-like decoys, who try to harvest their skin until they are saved by wooden decoys. Their rescuers take them back to a hidden bunker populated by decoys, but are crushed to death when squid-decoys attack.

Finally, one Rick alerts all of the other decoys to their location in a final gambit to eliminate every remaining decoy. The final battle leaves only one set of decoys, but they are then killed by Mr. Always Wants To Be Hunted, a minor character from the beginning of the episode. Meanwhile, the members of the real Smith family, on an adventure with Space Beth, are alerted to the decoys' deaths.

In a post-credits scene, the wooden Jerry decoy, who escaped death by abandoning his family, is washed downstream and attacked by beavers. His body is then found by creatures in the distant future and, as his head is used for a mirror frame in a saloon, and later the plaque on a crucifix, he laments his inability to die.

== Cast ==
- Justin Roiland as Rick, Morty Smith, Scarecrow Rick, Glockenspiel Rick, Scarecrow Morty, Glockenspiel Morty, Mr. Always to Be Hunted
- Chris Parnell as Jerry Smith, Scarecrow Jerry, Glockenspiel Jerry
- Spencer Grammer as Summer Smith, Scarecrow Summer, Glockenspiel Summer
- Sarah Chalke as Beth Smith, Space Beth, Scarecrow Beth, Glockenspiel Beth
- Keith David as The President
- Tom Kenny as Steve
- Rob Schrab as When Wolf

== Production ==
"Mortyplicity" was written by Albro Lundy and directed by Lucas Gray. The episode debuted as the second episode as initially planned, but writers considered swapping it with the season premiere, "Mort Dinner Rick Andre". Co-creator Justin Roiland said that he expressed a preference for this swap, but that it was too late for the change to be made. Co-creator Dan Harmon said that "decoy families" were conceived long before their usage in this episode, and are very similar to clones and alternate timeline versions of the characters. Lundy said that the first half of the episode focuses on "solving the mystery" and the second half depicts its fallout. The conceit allowed the writers to "play around" with what would be in character for each family member.

== Analysis ==
IGN's Jesse Schedeen commented that the episode has "conceptual similarities" to the season three episode "The ABC's of Beth" and its debuting character Space Beth, due to the use of doppelgangers and Smith family members that may not be real. The episode makes a number of cultural references, including to the films Blade Runner (1982) and Ex Machina (2014). To explain a development in the clone's behavior, Rick says "it's basically Highlander rules now", in reference to the 1986 film of the same name. The post-credits scene uses the Queen song "Who Wants to Live Forever", which was written for and featured in Highlander. Both this episode and the previous one reference Interdimensional Cable, a concept that has recurred in the show since its introduction in "Rixty Minutes".

== Reception ==
Jesse Schedeen of IGN rated the episode 8 out of 10, enjoying its "chaotic, fast-paced approach" to "[keep] the viewer off-guard", despite exploring ideas that are "very familiar" to the show. Schedeen believed that a final twist was needed at the end of the episode, but that the post-credits scene is "sublime". He praised the "little gags" that are built upon throughout, such as "the various ways each family differs slightly from the next" and the Blade Runner and Highlander references.

Den of Geek's Joe Matar rated it four out of five, finding it creative and ambitious despite expressing a preference for the more "sitcommy characterization"-based episodes. Matar said that a scene between Rick and Beth in Muppet costumes "somewhat convincingly proves Rick and Morty can still make us care about its characters despite doing away with conventional protagonists". Steve Greene of IndieWire graded it an A, summarizing it as "an exquisite execution of a deceptively simple idea" and believing it to be "one of the show's best episodes in years". Greene commented that the storyline is "surprisingly clear to follow" despite the chaos and speed and that even repetitive moments had "a constant escalation happening that gives this episode the perfect kind of forward momentum".
