= Promortyus =

- Rick and Morty episode
- Episode no.: Season 4 Episode 7
- Directed by: Bryan Newton
- Written by: Jeff Loveness
- Production code: RAM-406
- Original air date: May 10, 2020
- Running time: 23 minutes

Guest appearance
- Cassie Steele as Tricia Lange

Episode chronology
← Previous "Never Ricking Morty"	Next → "The Vat of Acid Episode"
- Rick and Morty season 4

"Promortyus" is the seventh episode of the fourth season of the Adult Swim animated television series Rick and Morty. Written by Jeff Loveness and directed by Bryan Newton, the episode was broadcast on May 10, 2020, in the United States.

== Plot ==
Rick and Morty regain consciousness to learn that they have been mind-controlled by face-hugging semelparous alien parasites called the Glorzo. Having no memories of their time as hosts, they strap the dead Glorzo to their faces and learn the Glorzo have created a sophisticated society. Believing they are attempting to use Rick's ship to power a superweapon that will spread them to Earth, the duo manage to fight their way off the Glorzo home asteroid, causing mass destruction along the way. However, upon returning home, they learn that Summer had been with them on the mission and they left her behind. They return to the asteroid to rescue her, only to find that she is not controlled by a Glorzo and is worshiped as a goddess.

Summer explains that after Rick and Morty fell under the control of the Glorzo, she was spared due to a toothpick in her mouth, which prevented the parasites latching on to her face. She convinced the Glorzo to reform their society, abstaining from their usual practice of constant reproduction (a process that kills both them and their host bodies, which burst open as they lay new eggs).

Rick and Morty are captured, and Summer awkwardly improvises an escape plan by sentencing them to punishment by getting back in the ship, then trying to join them. The Glorzo turn hostile, but Rick uses a specifically tuned musical note which causes the Glorzo to involuntarily reproduce, killing them en masse. As they die, several Glorzo accuse the trio of destroying them simply for trying to advance their civilization. Upon returning home, Rick and Morty start feeling severe stomach pain. Fearing they are about to lay eggs, they say their final goodbyes to each other, but it turns out to be a regular bowel movement.

In the post-credits scene, Summer's friend Tricia Lange notices Jerry's new beekeeping hobby, expressing more and more intrigue until she admits she's sexually attracted to him.

== Production and writing ==
The episode, revealed to be titled "Promortyus" on April 14, 2020, was directed by Bryan Newton and written by Jeff Loveness.

== Reception ==
=== Broadcast and ratings ===
The episode was broadcast by Adult Swim on May 10, 2020. According to Nielsen Media Research, "Promortyus" was seen by 1.34 million household viewers in the United States and received a 0.74 rating among the 18–49 adult demographic.

=== Critical response ===
Jesse Schedeen of IGN awarded the episode with a 6 star rating out of 10 saying that the episode "is an amusing addition to Rick and Morty's fourth season, but certainly not one of this season's better episodes. Like so many installments of the series, the plot veers in some pretty wild and unexpected directions. However, the early momentum starts to fade after Rick and his grandson return to their killing grounds in search of Summer. "Promortyus" either needed a few extra plot twists or a good subplot to add more variety." Steve Greene of IndieWire gave it a "C+" rating, who felt that the episode in "borrowing a page from a handful of films in the long-running franchise (and a few outside of it), this is an episode that's mostly on sci-fi reference cruise control."
