= Rattlestar Ricklactica =

- Rick and Morty episode
- Episode no.: Season 4 Episode 5
- Directed by: Jacob Hair
- Written by: James Siciliano
- Editing by: Lee Harting
- Production code: RAM-405
- Original air date: December 15, 2019
- Running time: 23 minutes

Guest appearances
- Keegan-Michael Key as Testicle Monster #1; Eddie Pepitone as Testicle Monster #2

Episode chronology
← Previous "Claw and Hoarder: Special Ricktim's Morty"	Next → "Never Ricking Morty"
- Rick and Morty season 4

"Rattlestar Ricklactica" is the fifth episode of the fourth season of the Adult Swim animated television series Rick and Morty. The 36th episode overall, it was written by James Siciliano and directed by Jacob Hair and was broadcast on December 15, 2019.

== Plot ==
While setting up Christmas lights, Jerry falls off the roof. Before he hits the ground, Rick zaps Jerry with a ray that renders him lighter than air for 10 hours, then makes his shoes heavier than air, thus making Jerry neutrally buoyant and enabling him to jump higher than usual. Rick and Morty depart for an adventure, but their ship breaks down in space. While repairing it outside the ship, Morty is bitten by a snake astronaut which he then kills.

Morty tries to atone for the snake's death by buying another snake from a pet store and sending her to the race war-ridden snake planet; however, the snakes quickly discover that she is not from their world. Soon, various snakes appear in growing numbers to alternately attack or protect the Smiths. Rick explains that Morty's actions caused the snakes to unite and invent time travel. Rick and Morty travel to the Snake Pentagon to resolve the war, but the snakes' time machine is incomplete. A future Rick and Morty (who sports a black eye) appear with a snake-language book full of instructions on time travel, while also insulting their past selves. Current Rick and Morty travel to 1985 and leave the book at Snake MIT.

Meanwhile, Jerry loses one of his shoes, causing him to float away helplessly. Reasoning that he will either survive unassisted or have Rick blamed if he dies, he rejects Rick and Beth's attempts to help him. With minutes left on the ray as he is high above ground, Jerry prepares to fall to his death when a jet flies by, to which he attaches himself. The plane crashes after colliding with a flying snake, but Jerry survives.

Back on present-day Earth, the large amount of time travel alerts the Time Cops from "A Rickle in Time". They travel back in time and kill the first primitive snake to use tools, thus preventing snake civilization and causing the snakes to disappear. Jerry reveals himself to be on the roof, claiming he was there the whole time, and turns on the Christmas lights before falling off and breaking his leg, which Rick heals to 50% capacity, leaving the rest of the healing up to Jerry. Rick and Morty are rudely reminded by their future selves to make the time travel notes while they celebrate the holidays instead.

In the post-credits scene, the current Rick and Morty finish both the book and the devices so they can travel back to the snake planet, while waiting for their past selves to arrive, Rick reminds Morty to stay in the car next time, then punches him in the eye.

== Broadcast and ratings ==
The episode was broadcast by Adult Swim on December 15, 2019. According to Nielsen Media Research, "Rattlestar Ricklactica" was seen by 1.32 million household viewers in the United States and received a 0.75 rating among the 18–49 adult demographic, making it the lowest rated episode of the series (excluding the unannounced season three premiere) since season one's "M. Night Shaym-Aliens!".

== Reception ==
Zack Handlen of The A.V. Club gave the episode an A grade, feeling that the episode was:

...the best episode of the season (so far), and a pure joy from start to finish. It doesn't do anything revolutionary, it doesn't change our understanding of the characters, there's no sudden shock of emotion. But it's funny as hell, taking a basic premise at once incredibly dumb and clever as fuck, and running it straight into the ground. Good main story, and a good Jerry story, and some minor Christmas theming. I don't know as I'd say it was worth the wait, exactly, but my faith in the show is largely restored.

Joe Matar of Den of Geek gave the episode a 5 out of 5, feeling that "the first half of Rick and Morty's fourth season goes out strong with this not-so-festive Christmas episode".
