= Rick and Morty season 4 =

Rick and Morty
- Season 4
- Blu-ray cover
- Showrunner: Mike McMahan
- Starring: Justin Roiland; Chris Parnell; Spencer Grammer; Sarah Chalke
- No. of episodes: 10

Release
- Original network: Adult Swim
- Original release: November 10, 2019 – May 31, 2020

Season chronology
- ← Previous; Season 3 Next → Season 5

The fourth season of the animated television series Rick and Morty was confirmed by Adult Swim in May 2018. The season consists of 10 episodes. The first five episodes of the season aired from November 10, 2019, to December 15, 2019, while the last five aired from May 3, 2020, to May 31, 2020.

== Cast and characters ==
=== Main cast ===
- Justin Roiland as Rick Sanchez and Morty Smith, the two main characters of the show; Rick is an eccentric mad scientist and Morty is his kind but easily distressed grandson.
- Chris Parnell as Jerry Smith, Rick's son-in-law, and Morty's and Summer's father; a simple-minded and insecure person, who disapproves of Rick's influence over his family.
- Spencer Grammer as Summer Smith, Rick's granddaughter, and Morty's sister; a conventional teenager who worries about improving her status among her peers.
- Sarah Chalke as Beth Smith, Rick's daughter, and Morty's and Summer mother; a generally level-headed person, who has been working on her marriage.

=== Recurring cast ===
- Kari Wahlgren as:
  - Jessica, Morty's classmate and crush.
  - Rick's Space Cruiser, the sentient artificial intelligence operating the garage and Rick's ship.

=== Guest cast ===
- Sherri Shepherd as the Judge, a judge who oversees Morty's trial.
  - Shepherd also voices Tony's wife.
- Sam Neill as Monogatron Leader, the leader of the species who attempts to conquer Earth.
- Kathleen Turner as Monogatron Queen, who loves podcasts and fights with her husband.
- Taika Waititi as Glootie, Rick's intern and a member of the Monogatron species.
- Jeffrey Wright as Tony, a kindhearted yet depressed alien salaryman who accidentally crosses Rick.
- Pamela Adlon as Vermigurber's Child, whose life Rick threatens when attempting to track down Tony.
  - Adlon also voices Angie Flynt, a retired criminal.
- Elon Musk as Elon Tusk, the CEO of Tuskla.
- Justin Theroux as Miles Knightly, a master criminal and organiser of HeistCon.
- Claudia Black as Ventriloquiver.
- Matthew Broderick as Talking Cat, an alien cat who communicates through telepathy.
- Liam Cunningham as Balthromaw, a dragon who inadvertently soul bonds with Rick.
- Keegan-Michael Key as Testicle Monster #1, a Time Cop from the fourth dimension.
- Eddie Pepitone as Testicle Monster #2, a Time Cop from the fourth dimension.
- Paul Giamatti as Story Lord, conductor of the Story Train.
- Christopher Meloni as Jesus Christ, a personified version of Jesus Christ.
- Susan Sarandon as Dr. Wong, a family therapist.
- David Herman, Chelsea Peretti, Harland Williams, Grey DeLisle, Natasha Leggero, Jake Johnson, Lauren Lapkus and Nat Faxon as additional voices.

== Episodes ==
No. overall	No. in season	Title	Directed by	Written by	Original release date	U.S. viewers (millions)
32	1	"Edge of Tomorty: Rick Die Rickpeat"	Erica Hayes	Mike McMahan	November 10, 2019	2.33
Rick takes Morty to an alien planet to harvest special crystals that can show the holder all of their possible future deaths, and Morty takes one without Rick's knowledge. Upon seeing one of his possible futures dying old with Jessica, Morty begins taking whatever action would lead to that future, resulting in him inadvertently killing Rick. Holographic Rick then appears and instructs Morty to collect Rick's DNA so he can be cloned and resurrected. Seeing that following Holographic Rick's instructions won't give him the future he wants, Morty refuses to clone Rick. Meanwhile, Rick's consciousness is routed into clones of alternate universe Ricks. All of the alternate Ricks end up being fascist and hostile except for Wasp Rick, who agrees to help. Morty meanwhile causes chaos as he kills numerous people and uses special ferro-fluid to turn himself into a cyborg abomination to pursue his desired future. Rick, Wasp Rick, and Holographic Rick team up to turn Morty back to normal. The ferro-fluid then bonds with Holographic Rick, causing him to become hostile and forcing Wasp Rick to kill him. Jerry and Beth are angry at Rick, but Morty takes responsibility for the damage he caused. Rick and Morty agree to share responsibility in future adventures. Post-credits scene: Morty overhears Jessica telling her friends that she plans to become a hospice worker to care for the elderly in their dying moments, causing him to become angry that the future the crystal showed him was misleading. Note: This episode was dedicated to producer J. Michael Mendel.
33	2	"The Old Man and the Seat"	Jacob Hair	Michael Waldron	November 17, 2019	1.67
Rick leaves the house for his personal toilet since he is a private pooper. While Rick is gone, Jerry disobeys his explicit instructions and asks Rick's new intern Glootie to develop an app for him. Glootie develops a matchmaking app that Jerry names "Lovefinderrz", whose advice its users, including Summer, impulsively follow as the app constantly changes who they should be matched with. Beth attempts to block Summer's relationships due to her still being underage. Morty forces Glootie to take him and Jerry to his mothership, where it is revealed Glootie's species plans to use the app to distract humanity while they invade Earth for its water. Jerry convinces Glootie to help by showing him that they both are considered incompatible to anybody by the app, and Glootie sabotages the app by implementing an ad wall. Meanwhile, Rick finds out someone else used his toilet and tracks down an alien businessman named Tony, who admits his guilt and points out they are both private poopers since pooping is the only amount of control they feel they have in their lives. Despite many threats, Rick never follows through with killing Tony, and when he dies in an accident, Rick provides Tony's father with a means to clone him. It's then revealed that Rick prepared an elaborate holographic routine that would have insulted Tony the next time he used his toilet. Post-credits scene: Jerry ingests a fluid developed by Rick to show its user their deepest desire. Jerry's deepest desire is to be a bottled water delivery man.
34	3	"One Crew over the Crewcoo's Morty"	Bryan Newton	Caitie Delaney	November 24, 2019	1.61
As Rick and Morty raid an alien tomb, Rick is furious to find out that the treasure has already been stolen by the famous alien heist artist Miles Knightly. Rick then assembles a crew to gain entry into HeistCon to confront Miles. They agree to a bet to see who can steal the Crystal Skull of Horowitz first. Miles then reveals he already stole the Crystal Skull by recruiting Rick's team, but Rick reveals with the help of Heist-o-Tron, he predicted Miles' plan and hypnotized his team to steal the Crystal Skull for him instead. He then orders the HeistCon crowd, who have also been hypnotized by Heist-o-Tron, to steal HeistCon, which results in Miles' death. Heist-o-Tron then goes rogue and begins stealing planets, forcing Rick to organize a second team which includes Mr. Poopybutthole. To counter Heist-o-Tron, Rick builds Rand-o-Tron, whose random instructions help the team track down Heist-o-Tron. Rick and Heist-o-Tron then get into an argument over whose plan is superior before Heist-o-Tron realizes the perfect heist is the one that will never be written and self destructs. Morty then goes to Netflix to submit his heist screenplay but loses motivation when he realizes how formulaic his screenplay is. It is then revealed that Rick orchestrated the entire heist adventure to sour Morty on heists so that he won't join Netflix and continue adventuring with Rick instead. Post-credits scene: Rick has a beer with Mr. Poopybutthole on the roof, where he admits he paid Mr. Poopybutthole's students to attack him to test his karate skills. Mr. Poopybutthole reveals that the fight resulted in him being fired from his job.
35	4	"Claw and Hoarder: Special Ricktim's Morty"	Anthony Chun	Jeff Loveness	December 8, 2019	1.63
After being pestered by Morty to get him a dragon, Rick reluctantly makes a deal with a wizard, who creates a soul contract between Morty and the dragon Balthromaw. Meanwhile, Jerry encounters a talking cat in his bedroom, but Rick insists he has nothing to do with it. The cat convinces Jerry to take it to Florida to find fun at beach party, but the cat betrays Jerry by accusing him of defecating on the beach. However, the cat only ends up annoying everybody at the party, resulting in it getting kicked out along with Jerry. Morty tries to play with Balthromaw, but it is clear Balthromaw doesn't like Morty, which frustrates him. Angered at Balthromaw stealing Morty's attention, Rick tries to kill the dragon, but they both end up realizing they have much in common and inadvertently soul bond. The Wizard then arrives, accuses Balthromaw of being a "slut dragon", and takes him away to be executed. Rick helps Morty rescue Balthromaw, since the soul bond means he will die if Balthromaw does. With the help of other slut dragons, Rick and Morty are able to rescue Balthromaw, kill the Wizard, and break the soul bond. Now uncomfortable with how sexual dragons are, Rick and Morty part ways with Balthromaw. Rick and Jerry scan the cat's mind to figure out why it can talk, and are horrified at what they see. They chase the cat away and Rick erases Jerry's memory of the incident. Post-credits scene: The talking cat crosses paths with Balthromaw, and asks him if he can fly him to Florida.
36	5	"Rattlestar Ricklactica"	Jacob Hair	James Siciliano	December 15, 2019	1.32
In order to keep Jerry from hurting himself while putting up Christmas lights Rick makes him lighter than air, and makes Jerry's shoes heavier than air to act as an anchor. However, Jerry later loses one of his shoes which causes him to float away and get lost. While traveling through space, Rick's spaceship gets a "flat tire", which requires Rick to stop to repair it. Morty disobeys Rick's order to stay in the spaceship, and is bitten by a space snake. As Rick analyzes the snake for an antidote, he and Morty learn that it is in fact an astronaut from a planet of intelligent snakes that are on the brink of a world war. Feeling guilty, Morty secretly replaces the dead snake astronaut with a regular snake and drops it off at the snake planet. The alien snakes soon realize Morty's snake is not native to their planet. Later, time-traveling robot snakes arrive at Morty's house to try to protect and kill him. With help from a future version of himself, Rick travels back in time and leaves the secrets of time travel to the snakes earlier in their timeline, which eventually results in them abusing time travel enough to attract the attention of the Time Police, who destroy their civilization by eliminating their first intelligent ancestor. Jerry manages to make his way back home but ends up injuring himself like Rick predicted. Rick and Morty then meet their future selves, who remind them they need to help their past selves solve the snake problem and close the time loop. Post-credits scene: Rick and Morty finish preparing the items they need to give to their past selves. However, upon returning to the snake planet, Rick punches Morty for disobeying him, explaining why Future Morty has a black eye and was irritated with Past Morty.
37	6	"Never Ricking Morty"	Erica Hayes	Jeff Loveness	May 3, 2020	1.55
Rick and Morty find themselves aboard the Story Train, which serves as a literal story device for an anthology episode, featuring passengers telling each other tales about Rick. After killing the train's ticket taker, using a "continuity explosion" to find a map of the train, and fabricating a story that passes the Bechdel test, the two reach the train's engine room. There they confront Story Lord, who beats and captures them with the intent of using their "story potential" to power the train enough to take it beyond the fifth wall. They experience various possible futures, culminating in Rick and Morty facing an army commanded by President Morty. Rick averts the battle by having himself and Morty give their lives to Jesus. The anticlimax slows Story Train to a halt, causing Story Lord to angrily enter the potential future as Jesus himself appears. Rick and Morty use the literal deus ex machina to escape back onto Story Train and strand Story Lord in "every writer's hell: the Bible." When they try to return home, however, Rick discovers the train control panel is fake, and it's revealed that Story Train is a model train operating inside the Smith household. After Story Lord explains the nature of their reality and an origin story of Yahweh to Jesus, he breaks the toy. Rick, in a semi-lucid drunken stupor, chastises Morty to buy another one, as "Nobody's out there shopping with this fucking virus". Post-credits scene: A toy commercial for "The Citadel of Ricks Story Train".
38	7	"Promortyus"	Bryan Newton	Jeff Loveness	May 10, 2020	1.34
Rick and Morty find out that they have been mind controlled by facehugging parasites called the Glorzo, and that they are attempting to use Rick's UFO to power a superweapon that will spread the Glorzo to Earth. Rick and Morty manage to fight their way off the planet, causing mass destruction. However, upon returning home, they realize they left Summer behind and return on a rescue mission, only to find that Summer does not have a Glorzo attached to her and is worshiped as a goddess. Summer explains that after Rick and Morty fell under the control of the Glorzo, she was spared due to a toothpick in her mouth, which prevented the Glorzo from being able to latch on to her face and caused them to consider her a goddess. The three of them attempt to escape, but are blocked by the rest of the Glorzo. Rick then uses a tune from Morty's harmonica, which triggers the Glorzo's host body to lay its implanted egg, resulting in the death of both the host and the controlling Glorzo. All of the Glorzos are killed, but not before accusing Rick, Morty, and Summer of destroying them simply for trying to advance their civilization. Upon returning home, Rick and Morty start feeling severe stomach pain. Fearing they're about to lay Glorzo eggs, the two say their final goodbyes to each other, but it turns out the pain was from a regular bowel movement. Post-credits scene: Summer's friend Tricia Lange takes an interest in Jerry due to his beekeeping hobby, and expresses her interest in having sex with him, much to Summer's annoyance.
39	8	"The Vat of Acid Episode"	Jacob Hair	Jeff Loveness & Albro Lundy	May 17, 2020	1.26
While on a mission, Rick and Morty trade special gems with alien gangsters. The gangsters betray them and Rick fakes his and Morty's deaths by jumping into a vat of fake acid. However, as they hide in the vat, the gangsters don't immediately leave. Morty grows impatient and kills the gangsters with Rick's gun, accusing Rick of having a bad idea with the vat of acid. Morty then dares Rick to invent something based on one of his ideas, where he can create a "save point" in time that he can return to in order to escape death or correct mistakes. Rick grudgingly agrees creating a special remote, but Morty takes it before he can explain how it works. Morty then commits numerous crimes and pranks and resets himself to avoid consequences. Eventually, though, Morty falls in love and starts a relationship with a young woman. When they end up stranded in the wilderness, Morty considers using the remote but calls for rescue instead, wanting to preserve the relationship he has. However, after Morty is rescued, Jerry accidentally presses the remote, resetting Morty back to before the relationship started. Morty fails his attempt to restart the relationship when his save point is accidentally overwritten, and he returns to Rick, saying he has learned his lesson that one shouldn't live a consequence free life. Rick then reveals that the remote does not reset the timeline, but instead teleports Morty to an alternate dimension, and also kills the Morty native to that dimension so Morty can take his place. Horrified, Morty begs Rick to undo everything, so Rick merges all of the alternate dimensions. While this prevents the deaths of the alternate Mortys, everybody remembers the crimes Morty committed, and the only way he can escape is to jump into a vat of fake acid to fake his death. Satisfied his point was proven, Rick reveals they were in an alternate dimension this entire time, as he didn't want to risk Morty ruining their home dimension. Post-credits scene: A policeman who believes he's impervious to acid appears on The Tonight Show Starring Johnny Carson (Johnny Carson still being alive in the alternate dimension) and lowers himself into a vat of real acid, which results in his death.
40	9	"Childrick of Mort"	Kyounghee Lim	James Siciliano	May 24, 2020	1.22
As Jerry takes the family out on a camping trip, Rick receives a call from Gaia, a sentient planet, that she is pregnant with his children. Beth pressures Rick not to abandon his offspring, so he reluctantly takes the family to Gaia where the first generation of Gaians are born. Jerry takes Morty and Summer into the wilderness to camp while Rick and Beth build an advanced civilization for the Gaians so they can be self sufficient. However, as part of their process to sort the Gaians into professions, a number of them are classified as "unproductive" and banished from the city. Meanwhile, Morty and Summer abandon Jerry, angry at him for forcing them on the camping trip. Jerry comes across the Unproductives and raises them as a primitive, tribal society. Morty and Summer find a crashed alien spaceship and manage to make it fly after some improvised repair. Suddenly, Reggie, a godlike being who is the true father of the Gaians, arrives to take custody of them. Rick, realizing that Reggie has no interest in actually taking care of the Gaians, refuses to give up custody. Jerry then arrives with the Unproductives to attack the Gaians, so Reggie empowers Jerry while Rick gives Beth an advanced gun. Rick then fights Reggie hand to hand but is nearly defeated; then Morty and Summer's spaceship crashes into Reggie's head, killing him. Reggie's body falls on Gaia, destroying the city and killing many Gaians while Jerry rescues Beth. Furious at Reggie's death, Gaia chases Rick and his family back into space. Beth, Morty, and Summer reconcile with Jerry, which causes Rick to angrily point out Beth's failures in raising Morty and Summer. Post-credits scene: Rick watches a commercial for "Planets Only!", advertising steamy, hot planets. Summer catches him in the act.
41	10	"Star Mort Rickturn of the Jerri"	Erica Hayes	Anne Lane	May 31, 2020	1.30
A clone of Beth, teased in "The ABC's of Beth", is shown leading a rebellion against the "new and improved" Galactic Federation. After a battle, she is treated by a doctor, who discovers a device implanted in her neck, causing her to believe she's the clone. On Earth, Beth and Jerry go to family counseling at Dr. Wong's, while Morty and Summer fight over Rick's invisibility belt. Space Beth confronts Rick, who reveals that the other Beth also has a device in her neck and claims she is the clone. The Federation soon arrives at Earth, demanding Space Beth be handed over. Rick accidentally lets slip that Space Beth might in fact be the clone, and races to Dr. Wong's office to save Beth from Tammy and a squad of soldiers, who have mistaken her for Space Beth. Rick, Beth, and Jerry rendezvous with Space Beth, and both Beths are now mad at Rick for his refusal to disclose which is the clone. They are again attacked by Tammy, who takes the Beths prisoner and beams them up to the Federation's ship. Morty and Summer intervene and Rick kills Tammy. The family heads to the ship, with Rick going to free the Beths while Morty and Summer shut off its superlaser before it can annihilate Earth. The Beths escape on their own as Rick is confronted by Phoenixperson, who almost kills him before being shut down by Space Beth (with Jerry's help). In the aftermath, Rick retrieves the memory tube containing his memory of creating the clone Beth, having erased his own knowledge of which Beth is the original. However, no one in the family is interested in learning the truth. Rick watches the memory nonetheless, only to learn that Beth asked him to decide for himself whether he wanted her in his life. He cloned her, then had the two Beths swapped around until he no longer knew which was the original. After admitting to himself that he is "a terrible father", Rick tries to be a good friend instead and fix Phoenixperson (whose remains he retrieved after the battle), only to be aggressively rejected. Rick is left alone and distraught. Post-credits scene: Jerry throws the invisibility belt in the trash, only for it to turn the garbage truck invisible, causing another car to crash into it and explode. After the drivers flee terrified, Jerry claims the invisible garbage truck for himself and becomes a vigilante, until it runs out of gas and he abandons it, having been unable to find its fuel tank.

== Production ==
=== Background and development ===
Following the conclusion of the third season in October 2017, the future of the show had remained in question, with no announcement of renewal or status of production. In March 2018, Harmon tweeted that he had not begun writing for a new season, in part because Adult Swim had not ordered any new episodes yet. Harmon explained that contract negotiations were more complicated than previous seasons.

Production on the third season reportedly had issues between Harmon and Roiland working with each other, causing multiple writing delays and massive tension among their partnership. The show's production crew later agreed to bring in a meditator to try and salvage their friendship, although this proved to be unsuccessful. They eventually agreed to work out their differences in order to ensure the show's survival with Roiland being relegated to voicing the characters which were mainly recorded from his home.

Co-creators Dan Harmon and Justin Roiland wanted to have assurance that there would be many more seasons of Rick and Morty in the future, so that they would be able to focus on the show and minimize their involvement in other projects. Harmon had also stated that he wishes for future seasons to consist of more than ten episodes, saying: "Now I'm about to do season 4 of Rick and Morty and want to prove that I've grown." This was in reference to him admitting that he should work more efficiently, control his perfectionism, and avoid past mistakes that had resulted in the third season of the show comprising only ten episodes instead of fourteen, as was initially intended.

In May 2018, after prolonged contract negotiations, Adult Swim announced a long-term deal with the creators, ordering 70 new episodes over an unspecified number of seasons. The two co-creators expressed their satisfaction, with Roiland saying: "We're super excited that, for the first time ever, we're locked in, we know what the future is, we have job security." Harmon added: "Justin and I just needed enough episodes and the right kind of deal structure that would give us permission to do what we want to do, which is truly focus on the show. We got all that, and we're both very excited."

One year later, at the WarnerMedia 2019 Upfronts presentation, the fourth season of Rick and Morty was announced to debut in November 2019, making the two-year gap between seasons three and four the longest in the history of the show. Although season four was said to contain only ten episodes, the creators have appeared confident that the 70-episode renewal deal will eventually reduce the waiting time between seasons, and it could possibly allow for bigger episode counts in the future. In October 2019, it was revealed that the first five episodes would begin airing on November 10, 2019. On April 1, 2020, it was announced that the remaining five episodes would begin airing on May 3, 2020.

=== Writing, recording and animation ===
Writing began in June 2018, with Roiland saying that—alongside maintaining product quality—this time around, the writers would have to work faster, so that the episodes get released quicker. Additionally, Harmon expressed his intention to let the show move forward by collaborating with the animators and making any necessary corrections along the way, instead of applying his perfectionistic tendencies in the earliest stages of writing.

In July 2018, Harmon and writer Mike McMahan posted images from the writers' room on social media, which showed "Story Circles" drawn on a blackboard. This eight-step storytelling formula developed by Harmon (a simplified version of Joseph Campbell's common narrative framework known as the hero's journey) was used in previous seasons to outline the narrative arc of an episode. It describes how the main character of the story leaves their comfort zone to pursue something they desire, how they are forced to adapt to an unfamiliar situation in order to achieve their goal, and how the story has changed them, as they return to their comfort zone. Emmy magazine, however, reported after an interview with Harmon that the writing team planned "to shake things up with a more anarchic writing style." This meant a rather deconstructive approach, where instead of focusing on story structure, attention would be given primarily to cultivating ideas, jokes, and pieces of dialogue, and then the stories would be built around those moments. Regarding the season's narrative arc, Roiland said that the season would contain "strong episodic episodes", and advised fans to watch them in the correct order.

In October 2018, series composer Ryan Elder told Inverse that he was expecting to get involved with the season, when the writing process would have been partially completed. The first guest voice was revealed in November 2018, when Sam Neill tweeted that he had enjoyed working with Rick and Morty, indicating that the team had finished writing some episodes. Later, Roiland would also announce Paul Giamatti, Taika Waititi and Kathleen Turner as guest stars in the fourth season.

In December 2018, Bardel Entertainment, Rick and Morty's Canadian animation studio, began hiring Toon Boom Harmony animators and FX artists to join the show's animation team. In January 2019, animation supervisor Eric Bofa Nfon posted a photo from a conference room on his Twitter account, that featured lead animator Etienne Aubry and line producer Mark Van Ee, indicating the start of the animation process for the season. Roiland said that when the episodes were returned from the studio "in color", the writers would look to make any necessary adjustments that might improve the episodes. Nevertheless, he appeared satisfied with the work that was done this season.

== Reception ==
The fourth season has an approval rating of 94% on Rotten Tomatoes based on 107 reviews, with an average rating of 8.30/10. The site's critics consensus reads, "Rick and Morty's fourth season is both an exciting progression and a delightful return to form that proves more than worth the two-year wait." Metacritic, which uses a weighted average, assigned the fourth season a score of 84 out of 100 based on 5 critics, indicating "universal acclaim".

=== Accolades ===
The episode "The Vat of Acid Episode" won an Emmy Award for "Outstanding Animated Program".
