= Star Mort Rickturn of the Jerri =

- Rick and Morty episode
- Episode no.: Season 4 Episode 10
- Directed by: Erica Hayes
- Written by: Anne Lane
- Production code: RAM-410
- Original air date: May 31, 2020
- Running time: 23 minutes

Guest appearance
- Susan Sarandon as Dr. Wong

Episode chronology
← Previous "Childrick of Mort"	Next → "Mort Dinner Rick Andre"
- Rick and Morty season 4

"Star Mort Rickturn of the Jerri" is the tenth and final episode of the fourth season of the Adult Swim animated television series Rick and Morty. Written by Anne Lane and directed by Erica Hayes, the episode was broadcast on May 31, 2020, in the United States. The episode is notable for featuring the first official appearance of "Space Beth", following her creation in "The ABC's of Beth", with the New and Improved Galactic Federation following her back to Earth as she seeks to find out which Beth is a clone.

== Plot ==
Beth is leading a rebel group in a fight against the "new and improved" Galactic Federation. After the battle, Beth is nursed by a doctor, who asks her if she misses Earth, to which she reveals that there is a clone of her on Earth (confirming that Rick did in fact clone Beth in "The ABC's of Beth"). The doctor then discovers an explosive device with a built-in proximity device to Earth in Beth's neck, causing her to believe that Rick doesn't want her to return. On Earth, Beth and Jerry go to a family counseling at Dr. Wong's, while Morty and Summer fight over Rick's invisibility belt. Space Beth surprises and confronts Rick about the device in her neck. Rick reveals that the other Beth also has an explosive device in her neck that will transfer the other Beth's memories to Space Beth once it goes off. Space Beth and Rick then dine together at a restaurant, where Space Beth reveals she is now the most wanted criminal in the galaxy for battling against the reformed Galactic Federation. The Federation then arrives on Earth in search of Space Beth. Reacting to this information, Rick accidentally reveals that Space Beth might be the clone, and after freezing her in place to prevent her attacking him, proceeds to Dr. Wong's office to prevent Tammy and her squad from killing Beth and Jerry, having mistaken Beth for Space Beth. Rick rescues Beth and Jerry and they rendezvous with Space Beth. With both Beths now mad at Rick due to his refusal to disclose which of them is the clone, they are again attacked by Tammy, who takes them prisoner and beams them up to the Federation's ship. Morty and Summer intervene and a vengeful Rick kills Tammy for making him go to a wedding and killing Birdperson.

The family then heads to the ship, with Rick going to free the Beths while Morty and Summer shut off its superlaser before it can annihilate Earth. The Beths escape on their own and arrive to save Rick, who is being confronted by Birdperson (now known as Phoenixperson). Phoenixperson defeats the Beths and almost kills Rick before being distracted by Jerry, who uses the invisibility belt to puppeteer a deceased Tammy, allowing Space Beth to shut him off. In the aftermath, Rick retrieves the memory tube containing his memory of creating the clone Beth, having erased his own knowledge of which one is the original Beth. No one else in the family wants the truth. Rick watches the memory nonetheless, only to learn that Beth asked him to decide for himself whether he wanted her in his life; his response was to use a centrifuge to randomize who was the original. After finally admitting to himself that he is "a terrible father," Rick tries to be a good friend instead and fix Phoenixperson (whose remains he retrieved after the battle), only to be aggressively rejected, so he shuts him down again. Rick is left alone and distraught.

In a post-credits scene, Jerry accidentally turns a garbage truck invisible, causing another car to crash into it and explode. After the drivers flee, he claims the invisible garbage truck and uses it to fight crime, but abandons it when it runs out of gas and he cannot locate the gas tank to refill it.

== Production and writing ==
The episode, revealed to be titled "Star Mort Rickturn of the Jerri" on April 14, 2020, was directed by Erica Hayes and written by Anne Lane. The title is a reference to the film Star Wars: Episode VI – Return of the Jedi (1983). The song "Don't Look Back" by Ryan Elder and Lauren Culjak is played during the episode.

== Reception ==
=== Broadcast and ratings ===
The episode was broadcast by Adult Swim on May 31, 2020. According to Nielsen Media Research, "Star Mort Rickturn of the Jerri" was seen by 1.30 million household viewers in the United States and received a 0.69 rating among the 18–49 adult demographic.

=== Critical response ===
Steve Greene of IndieWire awarded the episode a grade "B", saying that "with some subtle tweaks to a few of the show's past ideas, "Rick and Morty" heads into another off season on a surprisingly melancholy note." Joe Matar of Den of Geek gave the episode a 4.5 out of 5, saying:

This is a very good episode with great gags, fun character development, and one of those gut-punchy Rick and Morty endings that, while good, I have to admit, didn't hit me as hard as they have in the past. I think it's because this season has been consistently telling me not to take these characters and this multiverse so seriously. It's told me to sit back and watch the Smith family be cruel and snarky as they cleave their way through whatever sci-fi nonsense of the week. It's tough to try and get me to feel again after so much throwaway goofing-off. But it's still a solid episode that reminds us of what Rick and Morty does best and a strong way to close out a season.
