= The ABC's of Beth =

- Rick and Morty episode
- Episode no.: Season 3 Episode 9
- Directed by: Juan Meza-León
- Written by: Mike McMahan
- Original air date: September 24, 2017
- Running time: 22 minutes

Guest appearances
- Thomas Middleditch as Tommy Lipnip; Jennifer Hale as Kiara; Brandon Johnson as Mr. Goldenfold; Kari Wahlgren as Jessica

Episode chronology
← Previous "Morty's Mind Blowers"	Next → "The Rickchurian Mortydate"
- Rick and Morty (season 3)

"The ABC's of Beth" is the ninth episode of the third season of the American science fiction television series Rick and Morty. Airing on September 24, 2017, the episode was directed by Juan Meza-León and written by Mike McMahan.

== Plot ==
Beth learns that her childhood friend Tommy Lipnip's father is about to be executed by lethal injection for murdering and cannibalizing him, and recalls that she coped by imagining he got lost in the magical fantasy world of Froopyland. However, Rick reveals that Froopyland was a real procedurally-generated and childproofed pocket dimension he created for Beth as a child, and she realizes her memories of Tommy getting lost inside of it are real.

Upon reentering to locate Tommy, Rick discovers that the animals have become predatory and dangerous from segments of human DNA. They deduce that Tommy survived to adulthood by having sex with the creatures, consuming the offspring, and then ruling the least palatable as a king. Tommy's minions capture them, and he also accuses Beth of deliberately trapping him in the dimension out of jealousy for his family by pushing him into a honey swamp in a murder attempt, which Beth denies. After Rick takes them back, Beth accuses him of being a bad parent, while Rick counters that he made Froopyland to keep her occupied because she was a violent child. Beth tries to go back to reason with Tommy, but ends up killing him and his offspring. Rick and Beth reconcile and manage to save his father's life by creating a clone of Tommy from his severed finger. Back at home, Beth is presented with the option of having a replacement clone of her created, so that she will be free to travel the world.

Meanwhile, Morty and Summer visit Jerry for custody weekend to find he has entered a rebound relationship with an alien hunter named Kiara. When he decides to break up with her, he tries to blame the kids for forcing him to break up with her out of racist views, and an enraged Kiara tries to kill Morty and Summer. Jerry finally confesses to lying, and the situation is resolved following the revelation that Kiara was using Jerry to get over her previous boyfriend, much like Jerry was doing with her.

In the post-credits scene, Jerry's answering machine plays four messages: one from Kiara's boyfriend saying he is coming to kill Jerry, two from Rick saying that he has killed Kiara's boyfriend and had sex with her, and one from an appliance rental store clerk telling Jerry he can keep the answering machine.

== Production ==
On September 11, 2017, it was revealed that the episode title would be "The ABC's of Beth", as well as the release date of September 24, 2017. The episode's writing credit of series producer and writer Mike McMahan was revealed upon the episode's airing, as was the directorial credit of Juan Meza-León. "The ABC's of Beth" stars series regulars Justin Roiland as Rick Sanchez and Morty Smith, Chris Parnell as Jerry Smith, Sarah Chalke as Beth Smith, and Spencer Grammer as Summer Smith, respectively.

In addition, Thomas Middleditch voices the character Tommy Lipnip, an old friend of Beth's who became stuck in Froopyland as a child and resorted to terrible means to stay alive. In the end, Tommy is presumed dead and Beth and Rick create a clone of him to return to his parents. Also, Jennifer Hale voices Keara, an alien huntress whom Jerry briefly dates in the episode, and Brandon Johnson and Kari Wahlgren reprise their roles from previous Rick and Morty seasons as recurring characters Mr. Goldenfold, Morty's school teacher, and Jessica, Morty's long-time crush.

Inverse noted that the "biggest Rick and Morty season 4 mystery" of whether Beth or Space Beth (later introduced in "Star Mort Rickturn of the Jerri", the finale of the fourth season) is the real clone made by Rick. The article also delved into the concept of evil in the episode, saying, "'Evil is a construct that Rick doesn't really believe in,' series creator Dan Harmon says. 'The universe is populated with stupidity, and you're the smartest person in it. Then you're always going to be the most cruel. You're always going to be burdened by their dumbness. You're all alone in your intellect.'" In an Inside "The ABC's of Beth" video, writer Ryan Elder said, "[Rick] designed Froopyland to both entertain Beth so he didn't have to, but also to protect her from herself." In a review for the episode, in which The A.V. Club called it "stellar" and "consistently hilarious, while also touching on the show's biggest theme," Michael Walsh noted that "once again the show hit hard on its recurring idea that nothing matters."

== Reception ==
=== Viewing figures ===
The episode was viewed by 2.49 million Americans upon its airdate.

=== Critical response ===
The season has an approval rating of 96% from Rotten Tomatoes based on 10 reviews, and an average rating of 8.95 out of 10, with the site's consensus:

Rick and Morty dives into new and even kookier cosmic dilemmas in a third season that interrogates familial bonds, love, and nihilism—treating all existential topics to the series' trademark serrated wit.

IGN commented on the fact that Beth and Jerry usually don't play a starring role in given season 3 episodes, saying ""The ABCs of Beth" felt like a concerted effort to make up for lost time, and it didn't disappoint." Jesse Schedeen, the writer of the review, also said, the episode contained "Some pretty dark stuff, in other words ... It's enough to wonder if the writers went a little too far exploring the dark creature that lurks beneath Beth's pleasant exterior." Den of Geek called the entire season, especially "The ABC's of Beth", overstuffed, saying that it "loses the plot a little ... It's unfortunate because this series has been so good about gradually fleshing out all its characters beyond Rick and Morty and this was Beth's time to shine."

Writer Joe Matar of Den of Geek gave the episode three out of five stars. Jenny Jaffe of Vulture said that "If the fact that "The ABCs of Beth" comes right after "Morty's Mind-Blowers" is at all significant, we might conclude that they've done all of this before and they'll continue to do this again, in every conceivable universe, until the end of time. But as Rick—or Beth—might remind us, it doesn't really matter. Nothing does."
