= Mort Dinner Rick Andre =

- Rick and Morty episode
- Episode no.: Season 5 Episode 1
- Directed by: Jacob Hair
- Written by: Jeff Loveness
- Production code: RAM-501
- Original air date: June 20, 2021
- Running time: 22 minutes

Guest appearances
- Kari Wahlgren as Jessica; Dan Harmon as Mr. Nimbus; Jim Gaffigan as Hoovy

Episode chronology
← Previous "Star Mort Rickturn of the Jerri"	Next → "Mortyplicity"
- Rick and Morty (season 5)

"Mort Dinner Rick Andre" is the premiere episode of the fifth season of the Adult Swim animated television series Rick and Morty. It is the 42nd episode of the series overall. Written by Jeff Loveness and directed by Jacob Hair, the episode was broadcast on June 20, 2021. It received positive reviews from critics, who deemed it a strong start to the season.

== Plot ==
Rick and Morty are about to die crashing their spaceship, so Morty calls Jessica, confessing his true feelings for her. Not knowing of his imminent death, Jessica asks if she can come over to watch a movie. Now motivated to keep his date with Jessica, Morty frantically steers the spaceship into a palm tree and splashes down safely in the ocean. Rick, furious, reveals he has been in a longtime war with his nemesis, Mr. Nimbus, who controls the ocean. Nimbus appears, and demands to meet Rick for dinner at Rick's house to negotiate a treaty (which Rick agrees to, using it as a distraction while Summer dives into the Mariana Trench to steal the magic conch shell that gives Nimbus his power).

In preparation, Rick has Morty throw bottles of wine into a portal where time moves faster so as to age it, because Nimbus has demanding tastes. Jessica comes over and requests wine, so Morty enters the portal to get it. The portal leads to a farm where a bovine man named Hoovy helps carry a crate back to the Smith house. Upon returning through the portal, he finds his wife long dead, before his furious young adult son mortally wounds him. Hoovy tells his son that Morty did this. Throughout the years, Hoovy's son, grandson, and onward prepare for each of Morty's returns to fetch more wine, so they can kill him. They eventually take Jessica, so Morty goes after her. They trick and trap him, but Morty escapes with Jessica, with the help of Rick and Nimbus - who forgives his enemy, noting that they are nothing without the other.

When they return to the Smith home, Jessica, trance-like, shares her new understanding of time and goes home, leaving Morty disappointed. Just as Rick and Nimbus reconcile, Summer abruptly enters with the conch shell, making Nimbus furious again. He gives Rick a savage beating before summoning the police to haul Rick off to jail.

In a post-credits scene, Beth and Jerry debate whether they should take Mr. Nimbus up on his offer of a threesome before doing so and being assured by Nimbus that Rick will understand why they did this.

== Production ==
"Mort Dinner Rick Andre" was written by Jeff Loveness and directed by Jacob Hair—as was a previous episode, season four's "The Vat of Acid Episode". It is Loveness's fifth screenplay for the series. An animatic of the cold open was published by Adult Swim in July 2020. The episode debuted as the season premiere as initially planned, though the writers considered swapping it with the following episode, "Mortyplicity". The episode features Jim Gaffigan as Hoovy, Dan Harmon as Mr. Nimbus, and Kari Wahlgren as Jessica. Adult Swim published the episode on YouTube.

The character Mr. Nimbus was conceived for an earlier episode, but went unused. Loveness called him either the "antithesis" or "purest form" of Rick. Roiland interpreted that Mr. Nimbus is not unique in being Rick's "nemesis", and that he is not comparable to Rick in levels of power. However, in contrast to Rick's usual seeming invincibility, he is more restrained in this episode and must "play by the rules and not do any crazy shit". Roiland saw Morty's storyline as more significant: it originated from a discarded idea where Morty would accidentally forget a copy of the movie Beverly Hills Cop III (1994) in a pocket dimension and would return a few days later to find that 4,000 years had passed and a society had built itself around the movie. He said that it made sense to use a pocket dimension to store wine, to age it more quickly.

== Analysis ==
The title takes its name from My Dinner with Andre (1981), a dialogue-heavy comedy-drama film set at a dinner between two friends. The Community episode "Critical Film Studies" (2011) was an homage to this film on which Harmon previously worked. Kevin Perry of The Independent believed that the title is a misdirect as it leads the audience to expect the episode to focus more on conversation between Rick and Mr. Nimbus, rather than Morty's wine expedition.

Joe Matar of Den of Geek said that the episode mirrored the season four premiere "Edge of Tomorty: Rick Die Rickpeat" in not following a cliffhanger from the previous season and featuring a storyline about temporality, Jessica, and the outcome of romantic failure for Morty. Mr. Nimbus makes a comment to Rick about Diane—who has been implied to be Beth's mother and Rick's former wife in previous episodes. Harmon said that Rick's backstory would be further explored in the future. Morty is irritated at having to follow Rick's instructions, demonstrating his changing character from the more meek portrayal in season one. Harmon said of this that "Morty is not changing because he's aging [but] because he's been in the show for so long".

== Reception ==
Rating the episode 3.5 out of five stars, Joe Matar of Den of Geek described the episode as "smart and well-written" but familiar in its conceit of time passing faster inside the pocket dimension. Matar praised that the storyline's resolution involving Jessica was "funny and insane" and gave a lukewarm review of Mr. Nimbus, saying that he "just didn't find Nimbus particularly funny, but ... didn't hate him either".

David Opie of Digital Spy praised the series premiere, saying, "It's just as inventive as ever, and by not resetting the status quo, there's more room for character development." The Independent's Kevin Perry praised the choice to center Morty in the episode as "most promising in terms of where the show could now be headed" and serving to "remind fans why they fell in love with the show in the first place".
