= Never Ricking Morty =

- Rick and Morty episode
- Episode no.: Season 4 Episode 6
- Directed by: Erica Hayes
- Written by: Jeff Loveness
- Production code: RAM-407
- Original air date: May 3, 2020
- Running time: 23 minutes

Guest appearances
- Paul Giamatti as Story Lord; Christopher Meloni as Jesus Christ; Tara Strong as Story Train Computer

Episode chronology
← Previous "Rattlestar Ricklactica"	Next → "Promortyus"
- Rick and Morty season 4

"Never Ricking Morty" is the sixth episode of the fourth season of the Adult Swim animated television series Rick and Morty. Written by Jeff Loveness and directed by Erica Hayes, the episode was broadcast on May 3, 2020 in the United States and on May 7, 2020 in the United Kingdom.

== Plot ==
Rick and Morty find themselves aboard the Story Train, a literal story device for an anthology episode featuring passengers telling each other tales about Rick. After killing the train's ticket taker, using a "continuity explosion" to find a map of the train, and fabricating a story that passes the Bechdel test, the two reach the train's engine room.

There, the duo confronts Story Lord, who beats and captures them with the intent of using their "story potential" to power the train enough to take it beyond the fifth wall. They experience various possible futures, culminating in Rick and Morty facing an army of Meeseeks, Gazorpazorpian males, and robotic Ricks commanded by Evil Morty and a now-evil Mr. Poopybutthole. Rick averts the battle by having himself and Morty give their lives to Jesus.

The anticlimax slows Story Train to a halt, causing Story Lord to angrily enter the potential future, after which Jesus himself appears. Rick and Morty use the literal deus ex machina to escape back onto Story Train and strand Story Lord in "every writer's hell: the Bible." When they try to return home, however, Rick discovers the train control panel is fake, and it's revealed that Story Train is a model train operating inside the Smith household. After Story Lord explains the nature of their reality and the origins of the tetragrammaton to Jesus, he breaks the toy. Rick chastises Morty to buy another one, arguing that "Nobody's out there shopping with this fucking virus."

In the post-credits scene, a toy commercial for "The Citadel of Ricks Story Train" plays out, which includes the Jesus and Story Lord characters and the Story Train Rick and Morty.

== Production and writing ==
In July 2019, Paul Giamatti was cast in an undisclosed role on a then-upcoming season 4 episode of Rick and Morty. In May 2020, Giamatti was revealed to be voicing the Story Lord, alongside Christopher Meloni as Jesus Christ. The episode, revealed to be titled "Never Ricking Morty", was directed by Erica Hayes and written by Jeff Loveness.

== Reception ==
=== Broadcast and ratings ===
The episode was broadcast by Adult Swim on May 3, 2020. According to Nielsen Media Research, "Never Ricking Morty" was seen by 1.55 million household viewers in the United States and received a 0.87 rating among the 18–49 adult demographic.

=== Critical response ===
Steve Greene of IndieWire gave it an "A−" rating, complimented the episode's use of an extra-strength dose of self-awareness to grapple with the show's future.

Tom Reimann of Collider awarded the episode with a 3 star rating out of 5, writing that the episode:

has some incredibly funny bits, my absolute favorite being the harrowing journey of the Tickets Please Guy and the implementation of the phrase "cum gutters." Rick spews hilariously caustic observations as always, and the show’s trademark bizarreness is able to stretch its legs in several different directions thanks to the nonsensical anthologies through which Rick and Morty have to wade. However, "Never Ricking Morty" feels almost too meta to leave a completely satisfying impression. Piling reference atop reference about professional script-writing is some serious inside baseball, and while Rick frequently calls out the frustrating lack of narrative cohesion, his comments don’t actually negate the fact that the episode doesn't have a coherent storyline. That said, I'm so happy to be watching Rick and Morty again that the episode’s high points were enough to carry through the end credits, after which we're treated to a commercial for the Council of Ricks Story Train that made me laugh out loud. Welcome back, you magnificent bastards.
