= Childrick of Mort =

- Rick and Morty episode
- Episode no.: Season 4 Episode 9
- Directed by: Kyounghee Lim
- Written by: James Siciliano
- Production code: RAM-409
- Original air date: May 24, 2020
- Running time: 23 minutes

Episode chronology
← Previous "The Vat of Acid Episode"	Next → "Star Mort Rickturn of the Jerri"
- Rick and Morty season 4

"Childrick of Mort" is the ninth and penultimate episode of the fourth season of the Adult Swim animated television series Rick and Morty. Written by James Siciliano and directed by Kyounghee Lim, the episode was broadcast on May 24, 2020 in the United States.

== Plot ==
As the Smith family go on a camping trip, Rick receives a call from Gaia, a sentient planet, that she is pregnant with his children. Rick reluctantly takes the family to Gaia, where they witness the birth of the first generation of Gaians. Rick denies being the father, but he and Beth build an advanced city for the Gaians so they can become a self-sufficient, spacefaring civilization. Their system to determine professions for the Gaians ends up ejecting "Unproductives" outside of the city. Meanwhile, Jerry takes Morty and Summer camping in Gaia's wilderness. However, Summer bitterly accuses Jerry of using camping as an excuse to make himself seem important. Hurt, Jerry leaves the camp while Morty and Summer search for Rick and Beth. Jerry eventually makes contact with the Unproductives, whom he raises into a primitive, tribal society with a hatred for technology.

Morty and Summer get lost and find a crashed spaceship, which they repair but are unable to pilot. Just when Rick and Beth are on the verge of completing their project, Jerry leads his army of Unproductives against them. At the same time, a godlike entity named Reggie arrives. Gaia admits that she made a mistake, and Reggie is the true father of the Gaians. Reggie attempts to take custody of his children, but Rick refuses to stand down. Reggie empowers Jerry while Rick gives Beth an advanced gun, leaving the two to battle each other while Rick personally fights Reggie. Beth and Jerry fight to a stalemate, but Rick quickly finds himself at a disadvantage against Reggie.

Reggie is about to crush Rick when Morty and Summer inadvertently burrow their spaceship into Reggie's brain, killing him. Reggie's body falls to Gaia, destroying Rick and Beth's city and killing many Gaians. The impact causes Beth to fall into a crevass, but she is saved by Jerry. Furious at Reggie's death and the damage Rick caused, Gaia chases the Smith family back into space, leaving the surviving Gaians behind to fend for themselves. Jerry admits he only wanted to go camping to make himself feel important, and Morty and Summer apologize for their rudeness. Angry at the family taking Jerry's side, Rick coldly calls out Beth's parenting by revealing how Morty and Summer killed Reggie.

In the post-credits scene, Summer catches Rick watching a commercial for "Planets Only!", a service to find sexually attractive planets.

== Production and writing ==
The episode, revealed to be titled "Childrick of Mort" on April 14, 2020, was directed by Kyounghee Lim and written by James Siciliano.

== Reception ==
=== Broadcast and ratings ===
The episode was broadcast by Adult Swim on May 24, 2020. According to Nielsen Media Research, "Childrick of Mort" was seen by 1.22 million household viewers in the United States and received a 0.67 rating among the 18–49 adult demographic.

=== Critical response ===
Jesse Schedeen of IGN awarded the episode with an 8 star rating out of 10, saying that the episode "is another enjoyable addition to Rick and Morty: Season 4. If not the most zany or hilarious installment, it definitely benefits from having Jerry front and center for a change. Moreover, the slightly more downbeat approach feels appropriate given how much the Rick/Beth relationship is at the heart of this episode. Episode 9 is all about the struggle of being a good parent, and it's fitting that the conclusion leaves everyone a little unhappier and worse off than when they started." Joe Matar of Den of Geek gave the episode a 2.5 out of 5, saying that "with the whole Smith family involved, 'Childrick of Mort' is a welcome change of pace after a bunch of sometimes-samey, Rick-and-Morty-centric episodes, but only on the most basic of levels because it's kind of mediocre. A lot of crazy crap happens, as is Rick and Morty's wont, but a lack of standout jokes or interesting character moments renders the proceedings mundane. I didn't find 'Childrick of Mort' tiresome like I did 'Never Ricking Morty.' It's just whatever."
