= The Old Man and the Seat =

- Rick and Morty episode
- Episode no.: Season 4 Episode 2
- Directed by: Jacob Hair
- Written by: Michael Waldron
- Production code: RAM-402
- Original air date: November 17, 2019
- Running time: 22 minutes

Guest appearances
- Sam Neill as the Monogatron leader; Kathleen Turner as Monogatron queen; Taika Waititi as Glootie; Jeffrey Wright as Tony; Pamela Adlon as Vermigurber's child; Sherri Shepherd as Tony's wife

Episode chronology
← Previous "Edge of Tomorty: Rick Die Rickpeat"	Next → "One Crew over the Crewcoo's Morty"
- Rick and Morty season 4

"The Old Man and the Seat" is the second episode of the fourth season of the Adult Swim animated television series Rick and Morty. Written by Michael Waldron and directed by Jacob Hair, loosely adapting The Old Man and the Sea by Ernest Hemingway, the episode aired in the United States on November 17, 2019. It received mostly positive reception from critics.

== Plot ==
An alien intern named Glootie serves breakfast to the Smiths, often asking for assistance in developing a mobile app. As Rick pats his belly and excuses himself for a solo adventure, which Summer surmises as defecating, Jerry is curious and offers to develop Glootie's app, even though Rick has tattooed "Do Not Develop My App" on Glootie's forehead. Glootie and Jerry's app goes online; named "Lovefinderrz", it is a dating app that entices its users to divert their full attention into finding their true love. Summer ditches Beth on their lunch for her date, leading to a fight between the two.

Seeing the widespread chaos, Jerry joins Morty in demanding that Glootie take down the app. Glootie brings them to his mothership, where they meet the aliens' leader, who rebukes humanity's inefficiency in matchmaking and states that the app is a distraction to steal Earth's water resources. Beth chases after Summer, who constantly changes her soul mate with the app, while Jerry and Morty are captured. Jerry manages to convince Glootie to take the app offline, showing their similarity in being unable to find a match. As Morty chastises Jerry about his decisions, Glootie puts an ad wall on Lovefinderrz, causing all of the app's users to delete it.

Rick travels to a scenic, private lavatory. Discovering that it has been intruded upon, he tracks down the culprit, Tony. Despite admonishment from Rick, Tony points out Rick's need for control and continues to use the lavatory. Rick submerses Tony in the chemical "Globafyn" which places him in his ideal reality, a toilet-filled heaven reunited with his late wife. When Tony realizes the reality is false, Rick evicts him from the illusion. Tony suggests they be friends, which Rick rejects. Rick prepares a defense measure on his toilet designed to humiliate its future user. Upon Rick visiting Tony's office to bring him laxatives and chili, Rick learns that Tony has quit his job and died in a ski accident while attempting to live life to the fullest. Rick attends Tony's funeral and gives gifts to his father but insists that he and Tony were not friends. Rick returns to the lavatory and sits on the toilet, which spawns a crowd of holographic Ricks who mock "Tony" and his loneliness.

In the post-credits scene, Jerry consumes some Globafyn and sees his own ideal reality: himself as a competent, well-appreciated water-bottle delivery driver.

== Production and writing ==
"The Old Man and the Seat" was written by Michael Waldron and directed by Jacob Hair. The episode features guest actors Sam Neill as the Monogatron leader, Kathleen Turner as his wife, Jeffrey Wright as Tony; and director Taika Waititi as Glootie. Sherri Shepherd, who voiced the Judge in the previous episode, returned to the series as the voice of Tony's wife. A preview of the episode was released on July 19, 2019.

=== Themes ===
Vulture's Liz Shannon Miller noted that the episode mainly explores the themes of loneliness and isolation. Heavy attributes the title to be a reference to Ernest Hemingway's The Old Man and the Sea, in which an old man, waning in his abilities, struggles to catch a giant marlin.

The episode also introduces the chemical "Globafin", which taps into a person's brain and creates a Matrix-like simulation of that person's ideal heaven. In an analysis by IGN's Jesse Schedeen, he wrote that Jerry's desired heaven adequately presents him as a character who constantly battles his own feelings of inadequacy and laments his chronic unemployment.

== Reception ==
=== Broadcast and ratings ===
The episode was broadcast by Adult Swim on November 17, 2019. According to Nielsen Media Research, "The Old Man and the Seat" was seen by 1.66 million household viewers in the United States and received a 0.97 rating among the 18–49 adult demographic, making it the lowest rated episode of the series (excluding the unannounced season 3 premiere) since season 1's "Something Ricked This Way Comes".

=== Critical response ===
The A.V. Club's Zack Handlen gave the episode a "B+" rating, writing that "while the end result is pretty funny and thematically coherent", he also felt it as just "slightly under-done". Entertainment Weekly gave the episode an "A" rating. Steve Greene of IndieWire gave it a "B−" rating, and described it as "the equivalent of a mild inconvenience", remarking that "reinforcing some old ideas, Rick's quest for ultimate privacy and a globe-enslaving dating app are a flimsy foundation for a repetitive episode." Vulture's Liz Shannon Miller gave it a three-out-of-five star rating, and wrote that "From the simplest of setups comes, once again, a Rick and Morty adventure that simultaneously goes completely haywire even while it exposes the innermost pathos of its characters." Reviewing for Den of Geek, Joe Matar praised the extraordinary parings of Beth and Summer, Jerry and Morty, and Rick alone with himself as going "mostly extremely well." Ray Flook of Bleeding Cool described its concept as combining of the emotional gut-punch of the ending to the second season episode "Auto Erotic Assimilation" with the chainsaw-slicing social satire found in "Rick Potion No. 9" and any of the "Interdimensional Cable" segments.
