= Michael Waldron =

American screenwriter and producer

- Born: April 23, 1987 (age 39)
- Education: University of Georgia Pepperdine University
- Occupations: Screenwriter; producer
- Years active: 2014–present

Michael Waldron (born April 23, 1987) is an American screenwriter and producer known for his work on television series Rick and Morty (2019–2020) and Heels (2021–2023), creating the Marvel Cinematic Universe series Loki (2021–2023), and writing the films Doctor Strange in the Multiverse of Madness (2022), Avengers: Doomsday (2026), and Avengers: Secret Wars (2027).

== Career ==
Waldron graduated from the Grady College of Journalism and Mass Communication at the University of Georgia in 2010. In February 2014, Waldron was enrolled in the MFA screenwriting program at Pepperdine University and was an intern for the Adult Swim show Rick and Morty during its first season when he was hired by the show's co-creator Dan Harmon to be part of the production staff of Harmon's NBC series Community for its fifth season. In February 2017, he was writing the series Heels for Starz. By August 2017, he was executive producing the YouTube Red series Good Game.

In February 2019, he was hired as head writer and executive producer on the Disney+ series Loki (2021–2023). In November 2019, after producing several Rick and Morty episodes, Waldron wrote the season four episode "The Old Man and the Seat". In February 2020, he began writing the script for the film Doctor Strange in the Multiverse of Madness (2022). In 2021, he teamed with Starburns Industries, and created The Black Hole with Dino Stamatopoulos for TZGZ. On October 3, 2022, Deadline Hollywood reported that Waldron would once again be collaborating with Marvel Studios, having been set to script Avengers: Secret Wars (2027). In November 2023, Waldron was announced to be one of the writers of Avengers: Doomsday (2026) which leads into Secret Wars. In August 2024, he wrote the comedy series Chad Powers. In July 2026, it was reported that Waldron would write a film centered on the comics character Nova for Marvel Studios; Waldron was also considering potentially directing the film if it moved forward.

In March 2023, Waldron launched a new feature film and television production company, Anomaly Pictures, with his producing partner Adam Fasullo. In April 2026, the company signed an overall deal with 20th Television. As part of the deal, Waldron will co-create and executive produce a TV series based on the EPCOT attraction Spaceship Earth for Disney+. The series was given a pilot order in August 2026, with Waldron and Jason Fuchs writing the pilot.

== Filmography ==
=== Television ===
Year	Title	Credited as			Notes / Ref(s)
Year	Title	Writer	Producer	Creator	Notes / Ref(s)
2014	Community	Assistant	No	No	13 episodes
2017	Good Game	No	Executive	No	6 episodes
2019–2020	Rick and Morty	Yes	Yes	No	Writing: episode, "The Old Man and the Seat"
2021–2023	Loki	Yes	Executive	Yes	12 episodes
2021–2023	Heels	Yes	Executive	Yes	16 episodes
2025–present	Chad Powers	Yes	Executive	Yes	12 episodes

=== Film ===
Year	Title	Credited as		Notes / Ref(s)
Year	Title	Writer	Actor	Notes / Ref(s)
2022	Doctor Strange in the Multiverse of Madness	Yes	Yes	Role: Christine Palmer's Wedding Guest
2026	Avengers: Doomsday	Yes	No	Post-production

Additional Literary Material

- Thor: Love and Thunder (2022)
- The Fantastic Four: First Steps (2025)

== Accolades ==
Award	Year	Category	Nominated work	Result	Ref.
Primetime Emmy Awards	2020	Outstanding Animated Program	Rick and Morty (for "The Vat of Acid Episode")	Won	
Hollywood Critics Association TV Awards	2022	Best Writing in a Streaming Series, Drama	Loki (for "Glorious Purpose")	Nominated	
Hugo Awards	2022	Best Dramatic Presentation, Short Form	Loki (for "The Nexus Event")	Nominated	
Nebula Awards	2022	Ray Bradbury Nebula Award for Outstanding Dramatic Presentation	Loki	Nominated	
