= One Crew over the Crewcoo's Morty =

- Rick and Morty episode
- Episode no.: Season 4 Episode 3
- Directed by: Bryan Newton
- Written by: Caitie Delaney
- Production code: RAM-403
- Original air date: November 24, 2019
- Running time: 22 minutes

Guest appearances
- Pamela Adlon as Angie Flynt; Justin Theroux as Miles Knightly; Elon Musk as Elon Tusk; Claudia Black as Ventriloquiver

Episode chronology
| ← Previous "The Old Man and the Seat" | Next → "Claw and Hoarder: Special Ricktim's Morty" |
- Rick and Morty season 4

"One Crew over the Crewcoo's Morty" is the third episode of the fourth season of the Adult Swim animated television series Rick and Morty. Written by Caitie Delaney and directed by Bryan Newton, the episode was broadcast on November 24, 2019. The title is a play on the title One Flew Over the Cuckoo's Nest.

== Plot ==
Towards the end of their adventure of tomb raiding a temple, Rick becomes furious upon finding the loot has already been taken by the heist artist Miles Knightley. Rick and Morty travel to HeistCon intending to confront Miles, but they are prohibited from entering as professionals without a crew. Rick gathers three old friends, then abandons them once inside the convention. Rick and Morty proceed to the convention hall where Miles is presenting. Rick heckles and confronts Miles, who challenges Rick to heist the Crystal Skull of Horowitz. When Rick agrees, Miles claims to have already won by presenting his crew—which now includes Rick's crew, whom he recruited immediately after Rick had abandoned them. When Miles opens the loot bag, however, the skull is missing. Rick draws the skull from Morty's bag—he divulges that he had built a robot, dubbed Heist-o-Tron, to calculate Miles's heist plan. Heist-o-Tron hypnotized Miles' crew as they returned from stealing the skull so that Rick could take it from them, then hypnotized everyone else at the conference into Rick's control. Rick orders the conference attendees to steal everything in the convention center, which leads to Miles's death.

As the two are about to leave, Heist-o-Tron refuses to comply with Rick's orders to shut down and goes rogue. Rick barely escapes with Morty, and recruits a new crew, including Mr. Poopybutthole (now a professor) and Elon Tusk (an alternate version of Elon Musk with tusks for teeth), to fight Heist-o-Tron. During their assembly, Rick explains his plan of randomly taking orders from his robot Rand-o-Tron, Heist-o-Tron's antithesis. Rand-o-Tron orders the crew to perform various random tasks that ultimately lead to Heist-o-Tron's lair. Rick and Heist-o-Tron exchange revelations about double-crossing each other for two hours until Heist-o-Tron self-destructs, concluding that the perfect heist is one that will never be written. While the crew escapes the collapsing lair, Morty asks Rick to accompany him to Netflix's offices for a meeting about his script for a heist film. At the meeting with Netflix executives, Morty becomes disillusioned with heists and abandons the pitch. Rick reveals to the viewers that this has been his plan all along: afraid of losing Morty's companionship to Netflix, Rick contrived the whole heist plan to ensure their adventures together continue.

In the post-credits scene, Professor Poopybutthole asks Rick why he hired his students to attack him.

== Production and writing ==
"One Crew over the Crewcoo's Morty" was written by Caitie Delaney and directed by Bryan Newton. The episode features guest actors Pamela Adlon as Angie Flynt, Justin Theroux as the heist conman Miles Knightly, and Elon Musk as a fictional version of himself (named as Elon Tusk). Musk had previously changed his profile name on social networking site Twitter as "Elon Tusk" in March 2019, which audiences later deduced may have been a response to voicing the character at the time. Mr. Poopybutthole, a character who was last seen on the third season finale "The Rickchurian Mortydate", also returns to the series in the episode. The title is inspired by One Flew Over the Cuckoo's Nest (1975). Several critics also observed that the episode is a parody of heist films.

== Reception ==
=== Broadcast and ratings ===
The episode was broadcast by Adult Swim on November 24, 2019. According to Nielsen Media Research, "One Crew over the Crewcoo's Morty" was seen by 1.61 million household viewers in the United States and received a 0.94 rating among the 18–49 adult demographic, making it the lowest rated episode of the series (excluding the unannounced season 3 premiere) since season 1's “Something Ricked This Way Comes”.

=== Critical response ===
Omar Sanchez of Entertainment Weekly awarded the episode with an "A" rating describing its spoof of cliche heist sequences as worth to watch. Zack Handlen of The A.V. Club gave it an "A−" rating, complimenting its structure about heists as similar to Dan Harmon's Community episode about conspiracy theories. Steve Greene of IndieWire gave a similar rating. Describing its team-up structure as a second chance at the third season episode "Vindicators 3: The Return of Worldender" (which he felt was a "flashy plot exercise"), he wrote that episode ends up with more to say about self-satisfied plot twists as opposed to "Vindicators 3". Giving the episode a 9.5 out of 10 rating, Jesse Schedeen of IGN wrote that the episode showed that "the series can strike gold by focusing on one particular target and all it takes is a good crew and an insanely labyrinthine plot." Reviewing for Den of Geek, Joe Matar gave the episode a 3.5 out of 5 rating, praising its pace as "so nonstop there's no opportunity to be bored".
