= Claw and Hoarder: Special Ricktim's Morty =

- Rick and Morty episode
- Episode no.: Season 4 Episode 4
- Directed by: Anthony Chun
- Written by: Jeff Loveness
- Production code: RAM-401
- Original air date: December 8, 2019
- Running time: 23 minutes

Guest appearances
- Liam Cunningham as Balthromaw; Matthew Broderick as Talking Cat; Tom Kenny as Shadow Jacker

Episode chronology
| ← Previous "One Crew over the Crewcoo's Morty" | Next → "Rattlestar Ricklactica" |
- Rick and Morty season 4

"Claw and Hoarder: Special Ricktim's Morty" is the fourth episode of the fourth season of the Adult Swim animated television series Rick and Morty. Written by Jeff Loveness and directed by Anthony Chun, the episode was broadcast on December 8, 2019. A stand-alone sequel miniseries, Rick and Morty: Worlds Apart, was published by Oni Press from February 3 to May 5, 2021.

== Plot ==
After being pestered by Morty to get him a dragon as promised, Rick reluctantly acquiesces and makes a deal with a wizard, who creates a soul contract between Morty and the dragon Balthromaw. Morty tries to play with Balthromaw, but it is clear Balthromaw dislikes Morty. Angered at Balthromaw damaging the floor with his fire snoring, Rick is about to evict the dragon, but they both end up realizing they have much in common and inadvertently soul bond. The Wizard then arrives, accuses Balthromaw of being a "slut dragon", and takes him away to be executed. Rick helps Morty rescue Balthromaw, since the soul bond means he will die if Balthromaw does. With the help of other "slut dragons", Rick and Morty are able to kill the Wizard, freeing all the dragons from enslavement and breaking the soul bond. Now uncomfortable with how sexual dragons are and Balthromaw's clinginess, Rick and Morty part ways with the dragon.

Meanwhile, Jerry encounters a talking cat in his bedroom, but Rick insists he has nothing to do with it. The cat convinces Jerry to take it to Florida to find fun at a beach party, but the cat betrays Jerry by framing him of defecating on the beach. Later, the cat ends up annoying everybody at the party, resulting both of them being ejected. Rick and Jerry scan the cat's mind to figure out why it can talk, and are horrified by what they see. They chase the cat away and Rick erases Jerry's memory of the incident.

In the post-credits scene, the talking cat crosses paths with Balthromaw, and asks him if he can fly him to Florida.

== Casting ==
The episode features guest actors Liam Cunningham as Balthromaw the dragon, Matthew Broderick as the talking cat, and Tom Kenny as Shadow Jacker.

== Reception ==
=== Broadcast and ratings ===
The episode was broadcast by Adult Swim on December 8, 2019. According to Nielsen Media Research, "Claw and Hoarder: Special Ricktim's Morty" was seen by 1.63 million household viewers in the United States and received a 0.98 rating among the 18–49 adult demographic.

=== Critical response ===
IMDB gave the episode a generally positive score of 7.3 stars out of 10.0 Jesse Schedeen of IGN wrote that "the episode unfortunately ranks among the show's bigger misses". Steve Greene of IndieWire awarded the episode with a "B" rating describing it as a spoof of high-fantasy, with two incredible guest cast contributions keep this goofy chapter afloat.
