= The Vat of Acid Episode =

- Rick and Morty episode
- Rick drags Morty into the titular (fake) vat of acid.
- Episode no.: Season 4 Episode 8
- Directed by: Jacob Hair
- Written by: Jeff Loveness; Albro Lundy
- Production code: RAM-408
- Original air date: May 17, 2020
- Running time: 23 minutes

Episode chronology
← Previous "Promortyus"	Next → "Childrick of Mort"
- Rick and Morty season 4

"The Vat of Acid Episode" is the eighth episode of the fourth season of the Adult Swim animated television series Rick and Morty. Created by Dan Harmon, written by Jeff Loveness and Albro Lundy, and directed by Jacob Hair, the episode was broadcast on May 17, 2020, in the United States. The episode received largely positive reviews from critics, who praised the storyline and emotional depth. It won the Primetime Emmy Award for Outstanding Animated Program.

== Plot ==
Rick and Morty meet with alien gangsters at a factory to exchange valuable crystals. The gangsters betray them and Rick fakes his and Morty's deaths by jumping into a vat of fake acid; however, the gangsters do not immediately leave, and instead discuss their feelings before testing the vat's acidity. Morty eventually grows impatient, revealing the ruse and forcing Rick to kill the gangsters. Morty insists the vat of acid was a bad idea and harangues Rick over never taking any of his own ideas seriously. He goads Rick into creating a portable "save point" button that one could return to escape death or correct their mistakes. Rick relents and crafts a special remote, which Morty takes without waiting for an explanation of how it works.

Morty uses the button to commit numerous crimes and pranks, resetting himself each time to avoid any consequences. Eventually, though, he begins a relationship with a girl, falling in love with her. When they end up stranded in the mountains after a plane crash, Morty considers using the remote, but calls for rescue instead, since the last save point was right before they met. However, after they are rescued, Jerry unintentionally activates the remote. Morty then fails to recreate the relationship and accidentally overwrites the save point.

Morty concedes to Rick that he has learned the hard lesson that consequences determine who a person becomes and give a person's choices meaning. A self-satisfied Rick then reveals that the remote does not reset anything, but instead teleports Morty to alternate dimensions, killing the Morty native to that dimension so that Morty can take his place. Horrified, Morty begs Rick to undo everything, and Rick merges the alternate dimensions, causing Morty intense torment. While this undoes the deaths of the alternate Mortys, all the people in those dimensions who knew about Morty's crimes are now in that merged dimension and descend as an angry mob upon Rick and Morty's house, demanding his surrender. Rick provides only one escape: jumping into a vat of fake acid to fake his death. Morty begrudgingly complies, unaware that the merged girlfriend (who now remembers him) was watching. Satisfied that his point is proven, Rick reveals they have been in an alternate dimension this entire time, as he did not want to "waste" their current home dimension just to prove a point.

In a post-credits scene, one of the policemen present at the siege at the Smith home, who mistakenly came to believe himself impervious to acid, makes a guest appearance on NBC's The Tonight Show Starring Johnny Carson (Johnny Carson still being alive in this dimension). He lowers himself into a vat of real acid, resulting in his painful death.

== Production and writing ==
On April 14, 2020, the episode was revealed to be titled "The Vat of Acid Episode" and was produced by Mike Mendel, directed by Jacob Hair and written by Jeff Loveness and Albro Lundy. The plane crash and cannibalism scene was made to reference Uruguayan Air Force Flight 571, with Morty's girlfriend designed after episode director Jacob Hair's fiancée (later wife), Carey Armellino. Armellino also voiced the character, in addition to recording dialogue for a further episode later in the season, although all of her speaking scenes were ultimately cut. This episode is deemed by director Devon Avery as being inspired by his short film titled, "One Minute Time Machine".

== Reception ==
=== Broadcast and ratings ===
The episode was broadcast by Adult Swim on May 17, 2020. According to Nielsen Media Research, "The Vat of Acid Episode" was seen by 1.26 million household viewers in the United States and received a 0.68 rating among the 18–49 adult demographic.

=== Critical response ===
Jesse Schedeen of IGN awarded the episode with 9 stars out of 10 saying that the episode "is a demented romp that showcases Rick Sanchez at his darkest and most hilarious." Steve Greene of IndieWire gave it a "B+" rating, who felt that "even as it's stuck between an unexpected event episode and a decent spite-driven adventure, there are still enough existential ideas here to chew on." Tom Reimann of Collider gave it a "B" rating, who felt that "series co-creator Dan Harmon has run into some controversy on social media, and this ending, coupled with Rick's scorched-earth, take-no-responsibility response to Morty's criticism, casts the episode in a particularly cynical light that makes it difficult to fully enjoy. We're three episodes into 'The Other Five', and so far each one has been (at least in part) a rant about how hard it is to write Rick and Morty. I hope the next two episodes manage to fully embrace the smart sci-fi deconstruction that made the show so unique in the first place." The episode won the Primetime Emmy Award for Outstanding Animated Program, the series' second win after "Pickle Rick" and second nomination followed by “Mort Dinner Rick Andre” and “Night Family”.

== Music ==
- The montage in which Morty is shown using the reset button is set to the song "It's in the Way That You Use It" by Eric Clapton.
