= Mike McMahan =

American screenwriter

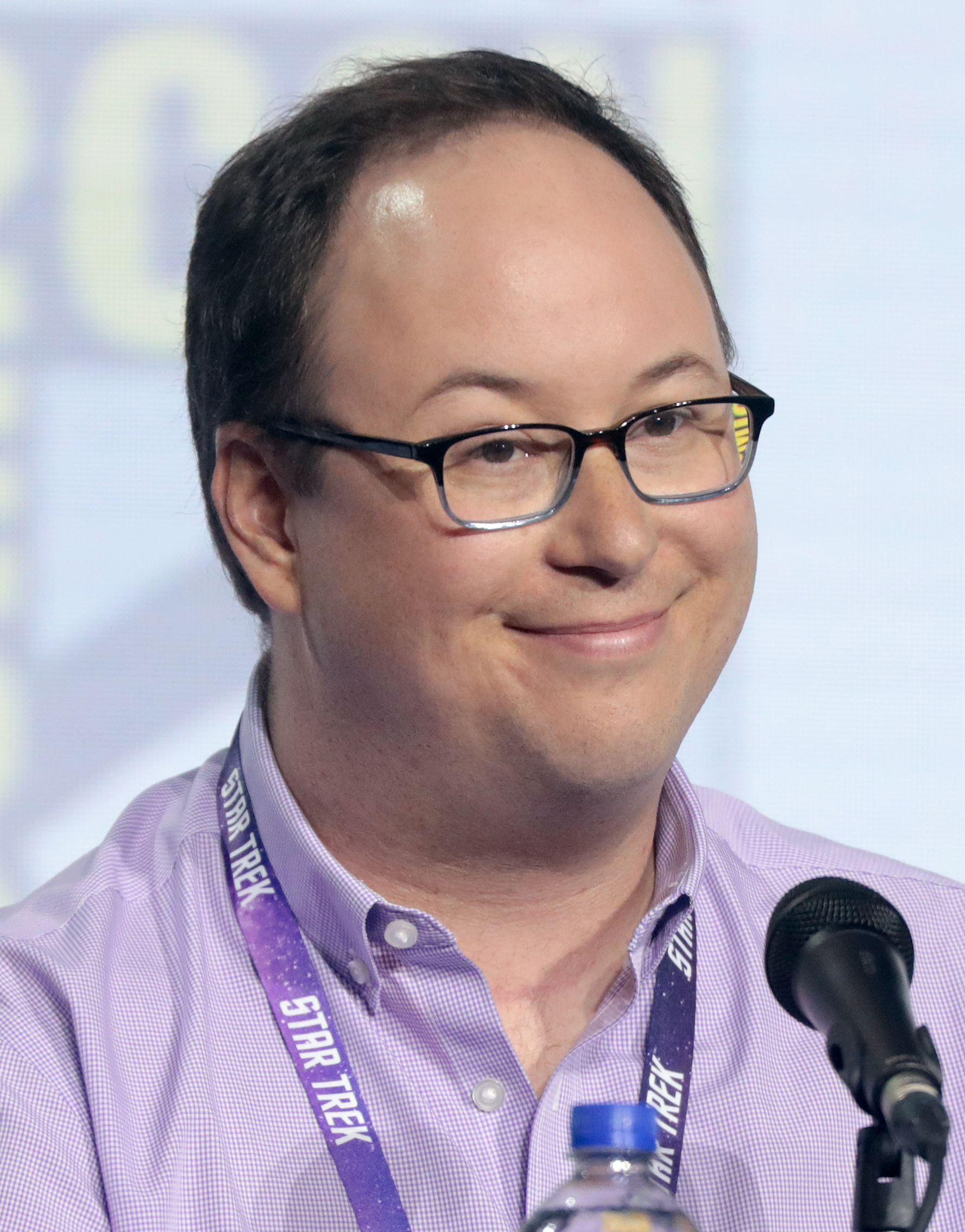
- Mike McMahan at the 2019 San Diego Comic-Con
- Occupations: Screenwriter; Television producer
- Years active: 2011–present
- Notable work: Rick and Morty; Solar Opposites; Star Trek: Lower Decks; Golden Axe

Michael "Mike" McMahan (born 1981) is an American comedy writer and television producer. He is the creator of the animated comedies Solar Opposites (with Justin Roiland) and Star Trek: Lower Decks.

== Career ==
McMahan, a native of Chicago, first worked in production as an assistant at The Second City. From there, he was hired by Scott Rudin Productions as a production assistant, and worked on Drawn Together and South Park.

Beginning in 2011 on Twitter, McMahan created the parody account @TNG_S8, a "guide" to the unaired eighth season of Star Trek: The Next Generation. In 2015, these posts were reworked into book form, and published as the official parody guide Warped: An Engaging Guide to the Never-Aired 8th Season.

McMahan served as a writer and producer on Rick and Morty. He was one of the first writers hired for the series, as he had met co-creator Justin Roiland while working at 20th Century Fox Animation. McMahan described himself as "kind of the sci-fi guy" of the staff, and was promoted to showrunner for the show's fourth season, though he left during production to work on other projects. In 2018, he won the Primetime Emmy Award for Outstanding Animated Program for his work as a supervising producer on the episode "Pickle Rick". He left the series shortly afterwards.

On August 28, 2018, Hulu announced it had ordered an animated comedy Solar Opposites created by McMahan and Roiland. The series premiered on May 8, 2020. In October 2018, McMahan was announced as the creator of Star Trek: Lower Decks for CBS All Access. In December 2020, he signed an overall deal with CBS Studios. On August 16, 2025, McMahan won a Hugo Award for his writing of the Star Trek: Lower Decks episode The New Next Generation.

On April 17, 2024, McMahan announced that he would be co-creator with Joe Chandler on an animated series take of Sega's video game series Golden Axe for the basic cable channel Comedy Central.
