= Cyanide & Happiness =

Webcomic series by Explosm Entertainment

- Cover of the print collection Cyanide & Happiness: Stab Factory
- Authors: Kris Wilson; Rob DenBleyker; Matt Melvin (until 2014); Dave McElfatrick (until 2025)
- Website: www.explosm.net
- Current status/schedule: Sundays, Mondays, Wednesdays, and Fridays
- Launch date: January 26, 2005; 21 years ago
- Publisher: Explosm
- Genre(s): Black comedy, satire, surreal humor, dramedy

Cyanide & Happiness (C&H) is a webcomic created by Kris Wilson, Rob DenBleyker, Matt Melvin, and Dave McElfatrick. The comic has been running since 2005 and is published on the website explosm.net along with animated shorts and longer episodes in the same style, often with a shocking or offensive tone. Melvin left C&H in 2014 and McElfatrick in 2025. Several other people have contributed to the comic and to the animated shorts as well.

The comic and animations use stick figure art to present graphic, dark, and often surreal humor which has been described as "seem[ing] to have no taste boundaries whatsoever", covering topics such as abortion, suicide, violence, and necrophilia. The comic was called one of the ten best webcomics by a columnist for The Telegraph in 2009, and by 2012 the website was receiving over a million views each day. C&H has won a Streamy Award and has been nominated for an Eisner Award.

C&H has had multiple spinoffs: there have been four seasons of an animated television show called The Cyanide & Happiness Show; four tabletop games have been produced; and two video games are in production.

== Conception ==
Cyanide & Happiness first appeared on explosm.net on January 26, 2005, but initial development of the comic started in 2004, under the name Comicazi.

According to Matt Melvin, he and Rob DenBleyker had been making stick figure death movies together around 1999 and 2000, and they knew Dave McElfatrick from the stick figure community. In around 2001, DenBleyker created the website StickSuicide, which hosted animations and games depicting the violent deaths of stick figures. According to Melvin, McElfatrick later joined StickSuicide, and Wilson was an active member of its forums.

Wilson has described himself as the creator of Cyanide & Happiness; Melvin said that Wilson started the style of C&H. Wilson started drawing stick figures while he was home sick from high school with strep throat, and was posting comics on the StickSuicide forums. According to Melvin, "when we decided to branch off from just stick figure death movies and do something more with the site, we [Melvin, DenBleyker and McElfatrick] started Explosm and brought Kris [Wilson] on board."

The website name "Explosm" came from a domain name DenBleyker was squatting on. Another potential domain name for the website was "BestWhileHigh.com" which would have the comics be named "BestWhileHigh", an idea Wilson disliked, as he thought it sounded too much like teen zine. Wilson said that when he heard the name "Explosm", he thought, "I don't know what you just said, but I love it!"

The first animation appeared on explosm.net in April, 2006.

== Creators ==
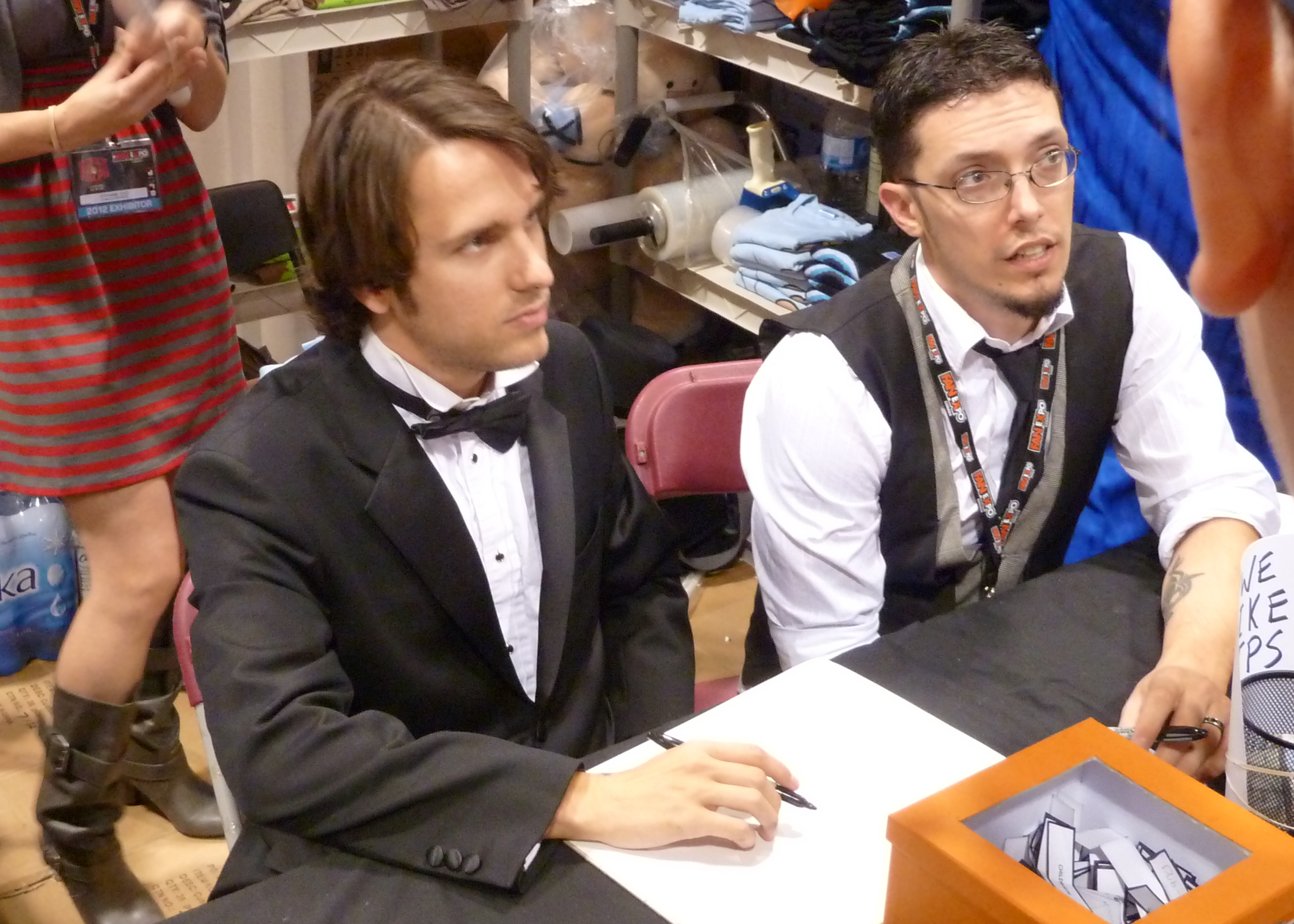
Rob DenBleyker and background artist Shawn Coss, Toronto, 2012

Cyanide & Happiness was started by four cartoonists who were at the time in different locations: in 2006, Rob DenBleyker was a college student at University of Texas at Dallas; Kris Wilson lived in Fort Bridger, Wyoming; Matt Melvin lived in San Diego, California; and Dave McElfatrick lived in Belfast, Northern Ireland. The creators did not meet each other face-to-face until the 2007 San Diego Comic-Con. In 2010, McElfatrick started a petition for a visa into the United States, in order to be with the other writers to produce more animated shorts. The petition garnered over 146,000 signatures and in September 2010 it was announced that Dave qualified for the visa that would allow him to work in the United States.

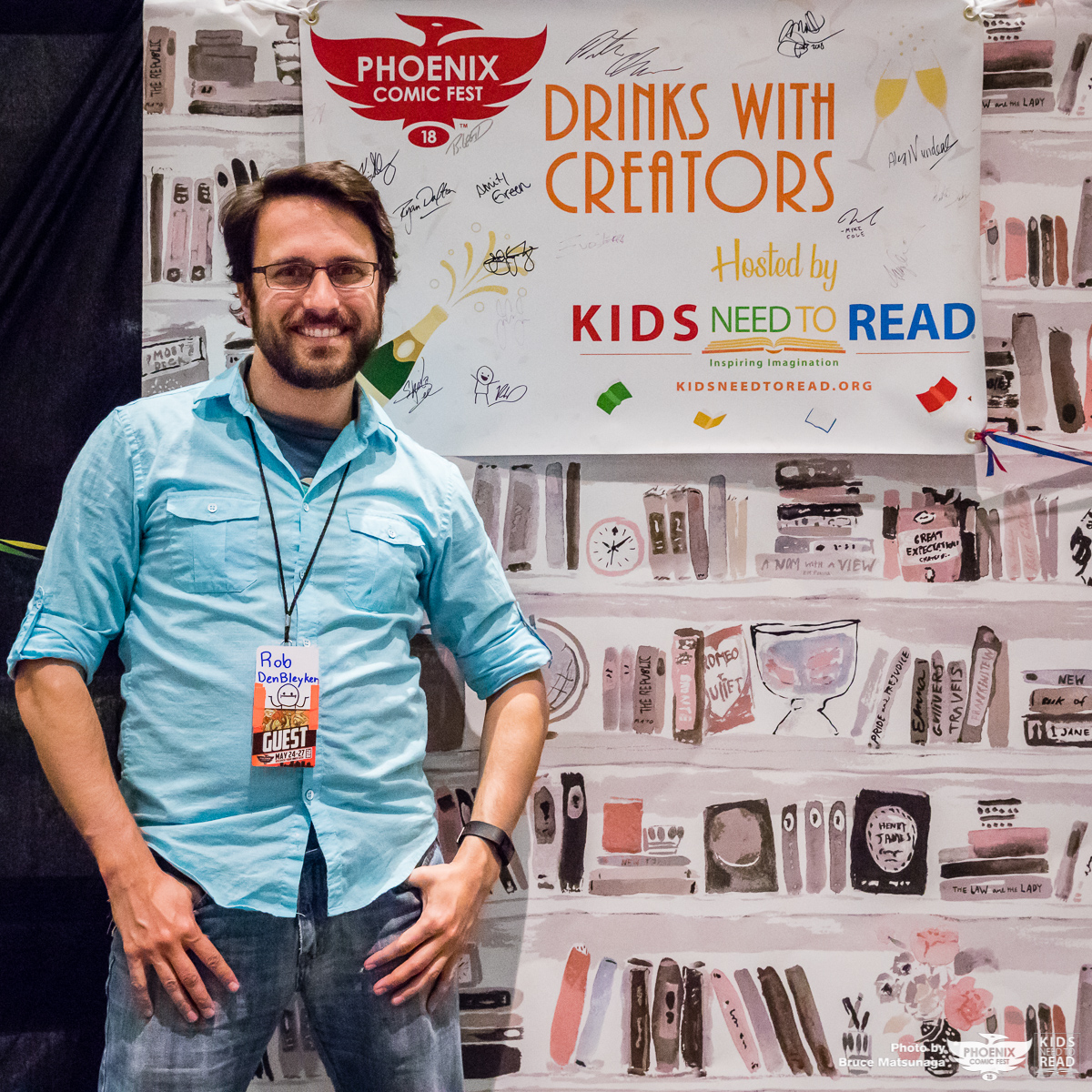
Rob DenBleyker in 2018

On August 31, 2014, Matt Melvin announced that he was no longer part of Cyanide and Happiness. Melvin said in a personal post that he was "pretty depressed over the turn of events. Making comics on the internet for a living was an absolute dream come true. To find myself no longer in that position is awful on multiple levels." Melvin later said in an AMA that the other creators forced him to leave through "a clause in our contract that, in the opinion of myself and all the lawyers I spoke to, was grossly misused" and that he was now forbidden to draw C&H characters. According to explosm.net, Melvin preferred "to focus his talents in web design and project management [and] very rarely worked on the animations. His comic production also scaled down, releasing only three to four per month, and his attention shifted to focus on more personal projects. Eventually Matt stepped down from project management, and in February 2014, left the C&H team entirely. The transition went smoothly, and the Cyanide & Happiness team was able to maintain momentum despite losing a member of the team."

Other creators have contributed to the comic and to the animated shorts, such as Chase Suddarth, Joel Watson, Connor Murphy, Zach Prescott, Bill Jones, Mike Salcedo and Shawn Coss.

According to their Twitter profiles as of 2021, DenBleyker still lives in Dallas, Texas, and McElfatrick now lives there too, while Wilson lives in Colorado.

On August 13, 2025, McElfatrick announced on Facebook that he would be stepping down after 20 years of drawing Cyanide and Happiness comics, and would be pursuing a webcomic named Boids, not to be confused with the algorithm of the same name. Dave’s last strip for Cyanide & Happiness was published on July 12, 2025.

== Production ==
=== Publication ===
The webcomic used to be published daily. Wilson credited the comic's success to consistent output, saying, "There are plenty of funny people creating content, but they're not consistent or reliable. The Internet has ADD, and if you're not constantly giving them something new, you're going to lose them."

Each cartoonist creates their own strips; they have used Skype for occasional collaboration. McElfatrick said in 2010, "We all help each other with writing sometimes, but generally each of us take turns in both writing and creating the comic on a given day." In 2010, DenBleyker was using Macromedia Flash to draw the comic.

=== Animated shorts ===
In 2006, the first animated version of C&H appeared on the website. According to Explosm, it currently releases a short each week. Many more people are involved in producing the animated shorts than in the comic; as an example one short released in 2017 had twenty-one people credited to its production.

== Format and themes ==
=== Format ===
Each Cyanide & Happiness comic strip varies in length, but are typically three to six panels. The comics are usually static, but some of the comics have animated panels.

=== Setting and characters ===
The comic regularly makes jokes on controversial topics including abortion, mental illness, suicide, AIDS, disabilities, and necrophilia. One review noted the characters in the comic regularly explode "along with being beaten, shot, and occasionally torn asunder by projectile food", another noted, "its subjects include correcting the spelling in a suicide note, a doctor feeling up a dead patient, and a character giving the Lincoln Memorial a lapdance", and another highlighted a strip in which a boy cries for four panels over the corpse of his father who was hit by a car.

Characters rarely have names and are usually only distinguishable by the colors of their shirts. The male characters almost always have no hair, which became a joke in itself in #642. Female characters are distinguishable by their long hair and chest size, often used to comedic effect. Some recurring characters have names, such as "Obese Maurice", the epileptic superhero "Seizure Man", and Jesus. DenBleyker said that the stick figure style "makes the characters seem very transient, as if they only exist for a given comic", and said that, "'Cyanide and Happiness' prides itself on having no characters or themes. If we ever bring up a character, we usually retire it after its share of original jokes has run out."

Some comics break the fourth wall. For instance, in #375, one of the characters looks at the reader, and the other asks what he is looking at. He then looks out and says "Holy shit! It's a person!" In #445, the panel catches on fire and the characters inside panic. In #680, a character has fallen through a broken bottom border of the panel.

=== Influences ===
Wilson and DenBleyker have mentioned the newspaper comic The Far Side by Gary Larson and the webcomic The Perry Bible Fellowship by Nicholas Gurewitch as influences for the comic. Wilson mentioned Don Hertzfeldt, Bill Hicks, White Ninja Comics, Monty Python, and David Wong as influences. At a 2012 panel, DenBleyker stated that he writes for up to ten hours a day and collaborates with friends. McElfatrick said he was inspired by old British children's comics such as The Beano and The Dandy. Melvin did not read comics as a kid, but enjoyed Larson's The Far Side and Matt Groening's Life in Hell; he preferred live-action sketch comedy shows such as The Kids in the Hall, Monty Python, Upright Citizens Brigade, and Mr. Show.

=== Events ===
On occasion, Cyanide & Happiness has featured Depressing Comic Weeks, where for the week all the comics are depressing or upsetting. The December 30 episode of the Cyanide and Happiness Show featured the "depressing episode", coinciding with the 8th depressing comic week at explosm.net.

Cyanide & Happiness has featured Guest Weeks, where readers submitted entries, and some were featured as daily comics over the course of the week.

== Reception ==
=== Readership figures ===
By April 2006, the website was receiving more than a million visits per week. By 2012, it received more than a million visitors each day.

DenBleyker has said that the comic's popularity grew from their sharing policy, "which encourages readers to repost and re-blog comics, effectively allowing anyone to spread Cyanide and Happiness' content." In January 2006, the comic was getting about 20,000 unique visitors a day, but "we added a little box under each comic which allows people to post an Explosm-linked version of the comic, which brings a lot of traffic back to us. After we put that box up, the traffic started exploding." After a few days, the comic received about 300,000 unique visitors a day, which consisted of mostly traffic from Myspace and LiveJournal blog links. Some people remove that box, which is considered stealing by cocreator DenBleyker.

In a 2010 interview, the creators reported that based on surveys and conventions their audience was split equally between men and women.

=== Critical reviews and responses ===
Tom Chivers, a columnist for The Telegraph, wrote in 2009 that Cyanide & Happiness was one of the ten best webcomics, saying, "The darkest, bitterest, rudest comic of the lot, Cyanide and Happiness is also one of the funniest... [the comic] seems to have no taste boundaries whatsoever... [this is] not one for the faint-hearted... approach with caution."

Writing for CBR in 2010, reviewer Brigid Alverson said, "The Cyanide & Happiness formula is pretty simple: Stick men (and women) do shocking things to one another. There are four different artists, but the style and humor are fairly uniform; a situation is set up in the first panel and resolved, by stabbing, boob-grabbing, or shouting "You have cancer! LOL!" in the last....Fortunately, the creators pace themselves, mixing different types of humor (including some clever wordplay and visual puns that aren't at all bloody) so that when someone gets stabbed in the forehead, it actually does come as a surprise. Also, there's more to Cyanide & Happiness than blood and gore. The gags really are funny, in a laugh-out-loud sort of way, and the pacing is usually spot-on. Occasionally someone is left hanging for an extra panel, but usually it works."

John Hargrave of the website Zug said that "Despite all this solo effort, the end product is coherent and strangely logical, as if the four creators were each viewing the peculiar world of C&H from a slightly different angle – a world in which disembodied heads turn into seagulls, and Jesus is a designated driver." A writer for student newspaper Yale Daily News said in 2012 that the comic was "known for its unusual, graphic and insensitive jokes". Writing for Comixtalk in 2007, reviewer Xavier Xerexes said that the art was "pretty minimal, but my impression is it's gotten better over the archives of the strip and really for awhile now has been pretty good. It's still stickmen, but it's a slicker stickman style".

In response to the question regarding controversial topics, DenBleyker said that the authors have not received a huge amount of serious negative feedback and do not intend to tone down the edginess of their comics.

The newspaper strip Pearls Before Swine parodied Cyanide & Happiness in a strip in June 2013. The strip claimed to be a rerun of a C&H strip, showing one panel in its art style with almost all of the dialogue censored by black bars.

=== Awards ===
The book collection Cyanide & Happiness: Stab Factory was nominated for an Eisner Award in the Best Humor Publication category in 2016.

Cyanide & Happiness won a Streamy Award in 2015 in the Animated Category, and was nominated again in 2016.

== Print collections ==
The first two books were released by Explosm through It Books, a division of HarperCollins. The third and fourth books were published by Boom! Box, an imprint of Boom! Studios. The first two volumes each feature 120 of the artists' favorite Cyanide & Happiness comics, and 30 previously unpublished comics. The third volume featured many Cyanide & Happiness comics from their Depressing Comic Weeks with 40 previously unpublished comics, while the fourth is another compilation of the artists' favorites.

No.	Title	Date	Pages	ISBN
1	Cyanide & Happiness	October 29, 2009	160	978-0-06-191479-9
2	Ice Cream & Sadness: More Comics from Cyanide & Happiness	October 5, 2010	176	978-0-06-204622-2
[not numbered]	The Cyanide & Happiness Depressing Comic Book	December 2012	89	978-1-939355-00-3
3	Punching Zoo	December 2013	89	978-1-60886-473-7
4	Stab Factory	November 17, 2015	192	978-1-60886-769-1

== Television adaptation ==
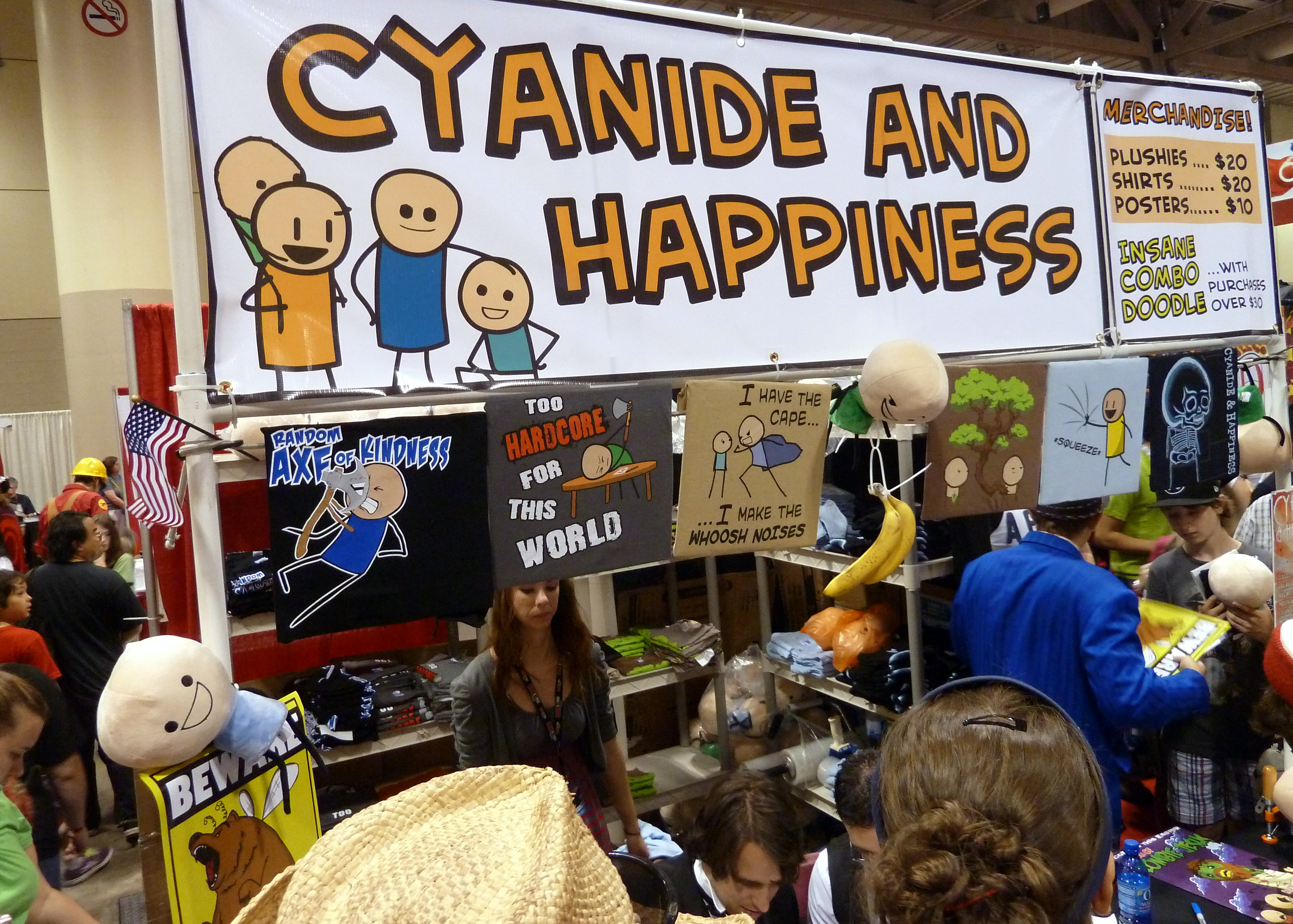
A variety of Cyanide and Happiness merchandise being sold at Fan Expo Canada 2012.

In addition to the animated shorts created for the website since 2006, the artists created The Cyanide & Happiness Show. This show was created following a Kickstarter in 2013 and premiered in 2014. The first season was released for free online, while for the second season it was picked up by TV network Seeso; later it moved to VRV.

The Cyanide & Happiness Show has had four seasons, each of 10–11 episodes. The episodes for the TV versions of the show were 22 minutes long. The animations have been in Adobe Flash format and are typically voiced by the cartoonists. The team hired contributors from the United States, India and South Korea for various processes.

== Game adaptations ==
=== Joking Hazard ===
In February 2016, Explosm started a Kickstarter project for a Cyanide & Happiness card game titled Joking Hazard, in which each card is a possible panel of a comic and the players must attempt to produce a humorous combination. The project's funding finished with over $3.2 million USD in backings, and at the time was the second most funded card game in Kickstarter history after Exploding Kittens. Joking Hazard was released in 2016; reviews have compared the game to Cards Against Humanity, and as of 2021 the game has an average user rating of 6.4 out of 10 on BoardGameGeek. In April 2025, the game became available as a playable app on mobile devices.

=== Trial by Trolley ===
In June 2019, another Kickstarter campaign for a card game project was launched, developed in collaboration with Skybound Entertainment, titled Trial by Trolley. The game is an adaptation of the trolley problem in philosophy where a player must choose a track to send an out of control trolley down. The campaign raised over US$3.5 million. Trial by Trolley was released in 2020 and it also has a 6.4 out of 10 rating on BoardGameGeek.

=== Rapture Rejects ===
In November 2018, Explosm Games, along with developer studio Galvanic Games and publisher tinyBuild, released Rapture Rejects to Steam as an early access game. Rapture Rejects is a battle royale style game. The developers stated that they planned to release the game in early 2020, but the game remained in early access, and is no longer available for sale.

=== Freakpocalypse ===
In September 2017, Explosm began another Kickstarter for a Cyanide & Happiness video game with a goal of $300,000, earning over $575,000. The game is described to borrow elements from games such as South Park: The Stick of Truth. The game was slated to be released near the end of 2018 but was later pushed to 2019, then delayed again to 2020 and then again until "early 2021". The game's title was announced in March 2020 to be Cyanide & Happiness: Freakpocalypse Part 1 – Hall Pass to Hell. The first part of the game was released on March 11, 2021.

=== Master Dater ===
In March 2022, Explosm began Gamefound for a new Cyanide & Happiness card game titled Master Dater. It was released on February 14, 2023.

=== Texas Hold it ===
In November 2024, Explosm released a new Cyanide & Happiness card game titled Texas Hold it. It was released on November 25, 2024.

== Other adaptations ==
Explosm released a Cyanide & Happiness mobile app in 2013. The free "Lite" version allowed the user to access the last 30 days of the archive.

Cyanide & Happiness characters were used in the television advertisements for Orange Mobile's Orange Wednesdays, though in an interview Matt Melvin said the characters in the ads "weren't really C&H characters, but were definitely based on them."

The artists of C&H produced comic adaptations of user stories for the website FMyLife, in the same art style as C&H.

Merchandise sold by Cyanide and Happiness includes T-shirts, figurines, housewares, school supplies, signed prints, and a beer.

== Other works by the creators ==
DenBleyker made his first animated series called Joe Zombie, which lasted six episodes, and left fans to anticipate a seventh, where he stated "will come out eventually". McElfatrick wrote Die Romantic – A Look At Aiden, which scathingly critiques goth punk band Aiden. After leaving the Cyanide and Happiness team, Melvin started a new webcomic, titled The Last Nerds on Earth. Both Wilson and McElfatrick have branched into music, Wilson pairing up with Explosm music producer, Ben Governale, to form Varroa, and McElfatrick going solo on his own band, We've Got Hostiles. Wilson also does music for indie games. McElfatrick also produces his own YouTube videos, where he reviews games, and chats with friends, such as Gus Johnson. DenBleyker and Dave McElfatrick wrote and starred in a series called Purgatony followed by its spin off Purgatony Presents: Dead Air and The Stockholms within that same year.
