= The Cyanide & Happiness Show =

American animated web series

- Title design
- Genre: Adult animation Sketch comedy Black comedy Satire
- Created by: Kris Wilson; Rob DenBleyker; Matt Melvin; Dave McElfatrick
- Based on: Cyanide & Happiness by: Kris Wilson; Rob DenBleyker; Matt Melvin; Dave McElfatrick
- Directed by: Rob DenBleyker; Dave McElfatrick; Connor Murphy; Mike Salcedo; Joel Watson; Kris Wilson
- Theme music composer: Dan Paladin
- Opening theme: "I Like Your Hat" (written, produced, and composed by Dan Paladin)
- Composer: Steve Lehmann
- Country of origin: United States
- Original language: English
- No. of seasons: 4
- No. of episodes: 41

Production
- Executive producers: Kris Wilson (S2–4); Rob DenBleyker (S2–4); Dave McElfatrick (S2-4); Gary Binkow (S2–3); John Fitzpatrick (S2–3); Evan Shapiro (S2–3); Kelsey Balance (S2–3); Dan Kerstetter (S2–3); Adam Boorstin (S4); Michael Schreiber (S4); Grant DeSimone (S4); Joe Hodorowicz (S4)
- Producers: Sultan Al Darmaki (S1); Philip DeFranco (S1); Jeremy Edberg (S1); Devin Spurrill (S1); Greg Slagel (S2–3); Adam Nusrallah (S4)
- Editors: Thaddeus Grant Fenton (S2–3); Taylor Ransom (S4)
- Running time: 11–22 minutes
- Production companies: Explosm LLC; Lowbrow Studios; Studio71 (S2–4)

Original release
- Network: YouTube
- Release: November 12, 2014 – January 21, 2015
- Network: Seeso
- Release: January 7, 2016 – June 1, 2017
- Network: VRV
- Release: September 18 – November 20, 2019

The Cyanide & Happiness Show is an American adult animated web series created by Kris Wilson, Rob DenBleyker, Matt Melvin, and Dave McElfatrick based on their webcomic Cyanide & Happiness. Each episode consists of a few short stories that have little to no connection to each other (with the exception of six episodes from the third season, which were a story arc). The creators described the goal of each episode to be "to extract the human excretion known as laughter from your face hole via fast-paced weird comedy."

The Cyanide & Happiness Show was funded through a successful Kickstarter campaign. The first season was initially released on YouTube from November 12, 2014, to January 21, 2015. The show was later acquired by Seeso, which produced second and third seasons before selling the show to VRV in mid-2017. On February 20, 2019, it was announced that VRV had renewed the show for a fourth season, which comprised ten episodes. Following the closure of VRV, the show has not seen any new seasons or episodes since 2019 with all the episodes being released on Explosm’s YouTube channel.

== Production ==
The Explosm team had been creating short videos based on Cyanide & Happiness for years before working on the full show. The Explosm YouTube channel had over 3.6 million subscribers and 490 million views before The Cyanide & Happiness Show started airing. Some of these short videos, such as "Junk Mail" and "Confession", have proven "overwhelmingly popular" among fans of the webcomic.

The Cyanide & Happiness Show was funded by the means of a Kickstarter campaign in early 2013, where it collected a total of $770,309. This was more than three times the initial goal and broke the record of most money ever funded for an animated series on Kickstarter. Among the "zany gift offerings" given to Kickstarter backers was an "all-expenses-paid trip to Dallas for a Banana Bar Crawl replete with a banana costume, scepter, and crown".

When the Explosm team sat down to plan the first season, they realized 50 percent of the writing for it was already done, with some ideas being over five years old. Many of the stories used in The Cyanide & Happiness Show resulted from the team trying to make each other laugh while in a bar. Due to Wilson living in Fort Collins, Colorado, numerous plane rides and Skype calls had taken place during this process. As the show began to take shape, the team drew out management positions for themselves. McElfatrick was put in charge of art, DenBleyker covered animation and Wilson managed sound design and voice acting, but as the project went on, these roles loosened up. They outsourced some animation production to studios in the United States, India (Digitoonz), South Korea (BigStar Enterprise, Inc.), and more.

== Release ==
The creators originally attempted to negotiate a TV series deal with cable networks, but due to "concerns about artistic compromise", their efforts were fruitless. One of the creators wrote:

"We walked away from the first two [networks] due to rights and creative control issues. We thought that we could settle those issues in the third deal, but things didn’t quite work out as we hoped. We’re starting to realize that TV as an industry just isn’t compatible with what we want to do with our animation: deliver it conveniently to a global audience, something we’ve been doing all along with our comics these past eight years. That's just the nature of television versus the Internet, I suppose."

— Explosm

The first episode of The Cyanide & Happiness Show premiered in an Alamo Drafthouse Cinema in Richardson, Texas, on 12 November 2014. Episodes of the series were released on YouTube, but are also available for DRM-free, low-price download. These downloads were released shortly before the episodes were uploaded to YouTube. According to the creators, once bought, people are free to copy, edit and spread the material to their liking.

The second season of The Cyanide & Happiness Show was made available through the Seeso streaming service rather than YouTube. NBCUniversal Cable senior vice president Parra Hadden noted that, shortly after it was announced that The Cyanide & Happiness Show would be hosted on Seeso, the website saw a very large surge in traffic. Seeso renewed the series for a third season later in 2016. Prior to the closure of Seeso in late 2017, The Cyanide & Happiness Show was also made available on the streaming service VRV. The series premiered on cable television in February 2020 on Syfy's late-night programming block TZGZ.

In some countries outside the United States, similar to its format on Syfy, the series is aired as a 22-minute TV series, conjoining two episodes into one.

In June 2024, Explosm Entertainment was reported to be working on new content for Animation+, a streaming service backed by Streaming Ink Media in partnership with Samsung TV Plus.

In November 2025, the show became available to stream on Tubi.

== Reception ==
Imad Khan of The Daily Dot described Cyanide & Happiness videos as an "odd, but hilarious, mix of abrupt black humor that's overtly weird and doesn't pretend to be profound. It really does feel like a group of writers with free reign [sic] to animate whatever their twisted minds can think of."

== Episodes ==
Season	Episodes	Originally released		
Season	Episodes	First released	Last released	Network
1	11	November 12, 2014	January 21, 2015	YouTube
2	10	January 7, 2016	March 4, 2016	Seeso
3	10	February 2, 2017	June 1, 2017	Seeso
4	10	September 18, 2019	November 20, 2019	VRV

=== Season 1 (2014–15) ===
No. overall	No. in season	Title	Directed by	Written by	Original release date
1	1	"A Day at the Beach"	Dave McElfatrick & Rob DenBleyker	Rob DenBleyker, Dave McElfatrick, Matt Melvin, Andy Nawoj, Evan Peterson, Mike Salcedo, Jennie Mae Sweat, Joel Watson & Kris Wilson	November 12, 2014
2	2	"Why I Hate Summer Camp"	Rob DenBleyker & Dave McElfatrick	Rob DenBleyker, Derek Miller & Kris Wilson	November 19, 2014
3	3	"Grandpa's War Stories"	Kris Wilson, Dave McElfatrick & Rob DenBleyker	Rob DenBleyker, Ryan Hudson, Dave McElfatrick, Zach Prescott, Chase Suddarth, Joel Watson & Kris Wilson	November 26, 2014
4	4	"The Meaning of Love"	Rob DenBleyker & Kris Wilson	Rob DenBleyker, Joel Watson & Kris Wilson	December 3, 2014
5	5	"Dirty Dealings"	Kris Wilson & Dave McElfatrick	Rob DenBleyker, Dave McElfatrick, Matt Melvin, Jennie Mae Sweat & Kris Wilson	December 10, 2014
6	6	"San Diego Breakfast"	Rob DenBleyker & Kris Wilson	Rob DenBleyker, Dave McElfatrick, Chase Suddarth & Kris Wilson	December 17, 2014
7	7	"The Elusive Mr. Wimbley"	Rob DenBleyker	Rob DenBleyker, Dave McElfatrick, Derek Miller, Joel Watson & Kris Wilson	December 24, 2014
8	8	"The Depressing Episode"	Rob DenBleyker, Kris Wilson & Dave McElfatrick	Rob DenBleyker, Dave McElfatrick, Mike Salcedo, Jennie Mae Sweat, Joel Watson & Kris Wilson	December 31, 2014
9	9	"Tub Boys"	Rob DenBleyker & Dave McElfatrick	Rob DenBleyker, Dave McElfatrick, Derek Miller, Mike Salcedo, Joel Watson & Kris Wilson	January 7, 2015
10	10	"Episode Shmepisode"	Rob DenBleyker, Dave McElfatrick, Mike Salcedo & Kris Wilson	Rob DenBleyker, Dave McElfatrick, Mike Salcedo & Kris Wilson	January 14, 2015
11	11	"The Christmas Episode"	Dave McElfatrick, Rob DenBleyker & Kris Wilson	Rob DenBleyker, Dave McElfatrick, Mike Salcedo, Jennie Mae Sweat, Joel Watson & Kris Wilson	January 21, 2015

=== Season 2 (2016) ===
No. overall	No. in season	Title	Directed by	Written by	Original release date
12	1	"Too Many Trains"	Rob DenBleyker	Rob DenBleyker, Joel Watson & Kris Wilson	January 7, 2016
13	2	"Episode Too"	Dave McElfatrick	Dave McElfatrick & Joel Watson	January 7, 2016
14	3	"Too Tall a Tale"	Rob DenBleyker & Kris Wilson	Rob DenBleyker & Kris Wilson	January 14, 2016
15	4	"Too Much Time"	Kris Wilson & Mike Salcedo	Kris Wilson & Mike Salcedo	January 21, 2016
16	5	"World War Too"	Dave McElfatrick	Dave McElfatrick	January 28, 2016
17	6	"Too Deep Too Furious"	Rob DenBleyker	Rob DenBleyker	February 4, 2016
18	7	"Too Many Hats"	Kris Wilson	Kris Wilson, Dave McElfatrick, Rob DenBleyker & Jennie Mae Sweat	February 11, 2016
19	8	"Too Many Cops"	Dave McElfatrick	Dave McElfatrick, Kris Wilson & Rob DenBleyker	February 18, 2016
20	9	"Too Many Superheroes"	Rob DenBleyker	Rob DenBleyker & Joel Watson	February 25, 2016
21	10	"Too Much History"	Kris Wilson, Dave McElfatrick & Rob DenBleyker	Kris Wilson, Dave McElfatrick, Rob DenBleyker & Joel Watson	March 4, 2016

=== Season 3 (2017) ===
This season was initially released on Seeso, but episodes 6–10 were later removed. In August 2017, it was announced that the rights to the show had been transferred to VRV, another streaming service. Coinciding with this announcement, the rest of the show was removed from Seeso and all episodes of all three seasons were made available on VRV.

No. overall	No. in season	Title	Directed by	Written by	Original release date
22	1	"Now That's What I Call Pain"	Mike Salcedo	Kris Wilson	February 2, 2017
23	2	"Now That's What I Call a Good Space Time"	Mike Salcedo	Rob DenBleyker, Kris Wilson, Joel Watson & Dave McElfatrick	February 2, 2017
24	3	"Now That's What I Call a Story"	Mike Salcedo	Dave McElfatrick	February 2, 2017
25	4	"Now That's What I Call Spooky"	Mike Salcedo	Dave McElfatrick, Rob DenBleyker, Kris Wilson & Joel Watson	February 2, 2017
26	5	"Now That's When I Call These Guys"	Mike Salcedo	Rob DenBleyker, Dave McElfatrick, Kris Wilson & Joel Watson	February 2, 2017
27	6	"Now That's What I Call News"	Mike Salcedo	Rob DenBleyker, Kris Wilson, Dave McElfatrick & Joel Watson	June 1, 2017
28	7	"Now That's What I Call a Musical"	Mike Salcedo	Joel Watson, Rob DenBleyker & Dave McElfatrick	June 1, 2017
29	8	"Now That's What I Call Depressing"	Mike Salcedo	Joel Watson, Dave McElfatrick, Rob DenBleyker & Kris Wilson	June 1, 2017
30	9	"Now That's When I Call Those Guys!"	Mike Salcedo	Joel Watson, Rob DenBleyker, Kris Wilson & Dave McElfatrick	June 1, 2017
31	10	"Now That's That"	Mike Salcedo	Rob DenBleyker, Joel Watson, Kris Wilson & Dave McElfatrick	June 1, 2017

=== Season 4 (2019) ===
No. overall	No. in season	Title	Directed by	Written by	Original release date
32	1	"Yo-Ho-Ho and a Nautical Bum"	Joel Watson	Joel Watson	September 18, 2019
33	2	"Strongbird"	Mike Salcedo	Mike Salcedo	September 25, 2019
34	3	"Chip Chapley Unscripted"	Joel Watson	Joel Watson	October 2, 2019
35	4	"The Man-Marryin' Candidate"	Joel Watson	Joel Watson	October 9, 2019
36	5	"The Animator's Curse"	Mike Salcedo	Mike Salcedo	October 16, 2019
37	6	"Lunk's Awakening"	Connor Murphy	Connor Murphy	October 23, 2019
38	7	"The Nine Ryans"	Mike Salcedo	Mike Salcedo & Rob DenBleyker	October 30, 2019
39	8	"The Good, the Butt and the Tumbling"	Joel Watson	Joel Watson	November 6, 2019
40	9	"Mega Prom"	Connor Murphy	Connor Murphy	November 13, 2019
41	10	"High, Robot"	Mike Salcedo	Mike Salcedo	November 20, 2019
