= Erin McGathy =

American comedian

- Born: Japan
- Notable work: This Feels Terrible; Human Conversation; Harmontown; HarmonQuest
- Spouse: Dan Harmon (m. 2014; div. 2015)

Comedy career
- Years active: 2007–present
- Medium: Podcasting, improv theatre

Erin McGathy is an American-Irish podcast host, artist, and comedian. She hosted the podcast This Feels Terrible, appeared and improvised in Harmontown, and co-hosted Human Conversation with Wayne Federman.

== Early life ==
McGathy was born in Japan and her family spent time in Italy, Texas, and Florida before settling in San Diego, California. She is the daughter of a military chaplain. Her mother died when McGathy was a young teenager. She started in improvisational comedy in high school. She dropped out of university in San Francisco to join an improv group before moving to Los Angeles where she began performing with the Upright Citizens Brigade and podcasting.

== Career ==
Her solo show about relationships, This Feels Terrible, premiered at UCB in 2010. It later became a podcast, with McGathy interviewing comedians and friends about their relationships. Notable guests included comedians Marc Maron, Dan Harmon, Wayne Federman, and director Rob Schrab.

McGathy became a frequent guest and "comptroller" on the Harmontown podcast. McGathy was a regular character on the show's Dungeons & Dragons segment and subsequently a cast member in the spin-off animated series from Seeso, HarmonQuest.

Beginning in March 2015, McGathy co-hosts the podcast Human Conversation with comedian Wayne Federman, in which the two discuss various, oft-delightful and meandering topics, without the aid of technology.

She co-founded the MOB theatre troupe in Dublin in 2018, and the following year debuted at the Dublin Fringe Festival her solo theatrical show, Al Dawes F***ing Loves You , in which she played a whimsical beta male comedian going through a break-up.

== Personal life ==
McGathy married television writer and showrunner Dan Harmon in November 2014. Their relationship was one focus of the Harmontown documentary, which detailed the podcast's tour across America. They announced that they were divorcing in October 2015.

McGathy moved to Dublin, Ireland in January 2016, after having worked on a WWOOF organic farm in nearby Dundalk.

== Filmography ==
=== Film and television ===
Year	Title	Role	Notes
2014	Harmontown	Herself	Documentary
2014	Drunk History	Narrator	Season 2, Episode 8 "Philadelphia"
2015	Knight of Cups	Erin	(uncredited)
2015	Community	Stacy	Season 6, Episode 12 "Wedding Videography"
2016 - 2019	HarmonQuest	Herself/Beor O'Shift	
