= HarmonQuest =

American adult animated series

- Series poster
- Genre: Live improvisation
- Created by: Dan Harmon; Spencer Crittenden
- Based on: Pathfinder
- Written by: Spencer Crittenden
- Presented by: Dan Harmon
- Starring: Jeff B. Davis; Erin McGathy; Spencer Crittenden
- Composer: Ryan Elder
- Country of origin: United States
- Original language: English
- No. of seasons: 3
- No. of episodes: 30

Production
- Executive producers: Dan Harmon; Spencer Crittenden; Joe Russo II; James A. Fino
- Producer: David Ichioka
- Running time: 25 minutes
- Production companies: Harmonious Claptrap; Starburns Industries; Universal Content Productions (Note: Credited as Universal Cable Productions for seasons 1–2)

Original release
- Network: Seeso
- Release: July 14, 2016
- Network: VRV
- Release: September 15, 2017 – October 20, 2019

HarmonQuest is an American adult animated web series created by Dan Harmon and Spencer Crittenden. The show is part animated, part live action. Harmon and comedians Erin McGathy and Jeff Davis, along with the game master, Crittenden, play a fantasy roleplaying campaign in front of a live audience, while each episode features a special guest player.

It premiered on the subscription streaming service Seeso in July 2016. Due to uncertainty around Seeso's future, the show was transferred to VRV Select in June 2017, with its second season airing a few months later. In October 2018, VRV renewed HarmonQuest for a third and final season, which was released on August 18, 2019.

== Cast and characters ==
=== Regulars ===
- Dan Harmon as:
  - Fondue Zoobag, a half-orc ranger.
  - Limerick O'Shift, Beor's resurrected brother.
- Erin McGathy as Beor O'Shift, a half-elf barbarian warrior, she resembles the comic book character Red Sonja
- Jeff Davis as Boneweevil, a goblin rogue
- Spencer Crittenden as:
  - Game Master
  - Charles the Dragon
  - various other characters

=== Guests ===
==== Season 1 ====
- Paul F. Tompkins as Teflonto, Earthscar's village champion and captain of the town's militia. Also a friend, mentor, and role model to Fondue and Boneweevil. ("The Quest Begins")
- Chelsea Peretti as Deepak Chopra, a dwarven monk and the lone survivor of an attack by one of the arcane horrors unleashed by the Demon Seal. ("The Stonesaw Mines")
- Steve Agee as Tech Powers, a Hellspawn bard. ("Welcome to Freshport")
- Ron Funches as Captain Rib Sanchez, a famous sea captain and smuggler. ("Across the Durnam Sea")
- Aubrey Plaza as Hawaiian Coffee, a gnome alchemist and prisoner of the Manoa Prison Hole. ("Manoa Prison Hole")
- John Hodgman as Hohn Jodgman, a travelling merchant and sorcerer. ("Entering the Sandman Desert")
- Thomas Middleditch as Dildo Bogpelt, a hobbit-like native of the Doorest of Fores. ("The Doorest of Fores")
- Kumail Nanjiani as Eddie Lizzard, a Kobold janitor of the Dragon's Temple. ("The Dragon's Temple")
- River Butcher as James Dean, the enchanted spirit of a spectral paladin within a sword found by Fondue in the Stonesaw Mines. ("The Secret Hideout")
- Matt Gourley as Chadge, Fondue's absent father. ("Earthscar Village")
- Nathan Fillion as Teddar Spice, the new Elf chief of Earthscar Village. ("Earthscar Village")

==== Season 2 ====
- Gillian Jacobs as Chip, a goblin rogue that temporarily replaced Boneweevil during the year he was trapped in the Demon Realm. ("The Quest Continues")
- Rory Scovel as Krandrelarius, a human witch whose name is as unpredictable as his personality, a previous acquaintance of Boneweevil that lives in a swamp. ("Demon Realm Devilry")
- Aparna Nancherla as Beauflecks Devrye, a demon hunter of Bonebreak Village. ("Bonebreak Village")
- Paul Scheer as Sensodyne, the Tooth Beast. A creature covered in glistening enamel skin-like armor. ("Into the Abyss")
- Patton Oswalt as Sandpole, a magical sand nomad. ("Back to Sandman Desert")
- Janet Varney as Sedona, a dwarf sorceress and proprietor of the Barely Cursed Bazaar of Commerce. ("The Barely Cursed Bazaar of Commerce")
- Jason Mantzoukas as Gribble Grabble, (AKA Grabble Gribble,) a young, bright, but shifty orphan on the streets of Forlona. ("The City of Forlona")
- Elizabeth Olsen as Stirrup, a half-elf arsonist. ("The Keystone Obelisk")
- Rob Corddry as Sandy, a barbarian of the Skulltree Clan and old flame of Beor's. ("The Castle of Etylai")
- Kumail Nanjiani returns as Eddie Lizzard. ("The Sorcerer of the Storm")

==== Season 3 ====
- Matt Gourley returns as Chadge. Having found religion, wielding Fondue's old blade that has his spirit trapped inside of it. ("Goblopolis Lost")
- Kate Micucci as Hermie, a druid from a nearby transhelm. ("The Shattered Myriad")
- Tawny Newsome as Donna, a Skull Tree Clan barbarian from the same village as Beor and Lymerick. ("Ivory Quay")
- Reggie Watts as Graildokt, Quinzelflip and unnamed - three goblin allies from Goblopolis. ("Goblopolis Found")
- Joel Kim Booster as Toriamos the dwarven explorer and dungeon expert. ("Terra Scissus")
- Jared Logan as Dave Pendergast, a paladin officer. ("Shatternine Village")
- D'Arcy Carden as Hydronai Sesapoia, an adventurous bard. ("The Bloody Teeth")
- Jessica McKenna as Flairence Sparrow, an inter-dimensional lawyer. ("Ad Quod Danmum")
- Carl Tart as Tampa Bay the Buccaneer, a sailor in the expanse of nothingness. ("The Starshade Expanse")
- Tom Kenny as Legnahcra the angel from Virtuous Harmony. ("The Virtuous Harmony")

== Episodes ==
=== Series overview ===
All ten episodes of the first season were released on July 14, 2016, on Seeso. On October 19, 2016, HarmonQuest was renewed for a second season, but due to uncertainty around Seeso's future, rights to HarmonQuest were sold to Otter Media's VRV streaming service in June 2017. The second season premiered on VRV Select on September 15 and concluded on November 17, 2017. In October 2018, it was announced that VRV had renewed the show for a third season, which debuted on August 18, 2019.

Season	Episodes	Originally released		
Season	Episodes	First released	Last released	Network
1	10	July 14, 2016		Seeso
2	10	September 15, 2017	November 17, 2017	VRV
3	10	August 18, 2019	October 18, 2019	VRV

=== Season 1 (2016) ===
No. overall	No. in season	Title	Guest	Directed by	Written by	Original release date
1	1	"The Quest Begins"	Paul F. Tompkins	Larry Houston	Spencer Crittenden	July 14, 2016
Fondue Zoobag (Dan Harmon), a half-orc ranger, and Boneweevil (Jeff Davis), a goblin rogue, start out in their hometown of Earthscar where the Demon Seal ritual is starting. Beor O'Shift (Erin McGathy), a half-elf barbarian woman, runs into the village asking for help with the cultists pursuing her. The party fights the cultists, joined by Teflonto (Paul F. Tompkins), Earthscar's champion, and the militia he commands. During the battle a mysterious knight named Vortheon strides into Earthscar and grabs the runestone protecting the Demon Seal, thereby unleashing three evil abominations. The cultists warn the party that they will collect all three runestones and resurrect the Great Manticore to destroy the world. Vortheon then blasts the party with dark blood magic, killing Teflonto, before fleeing through a portal with the surviving cultists. The village's chief convinces the party to go through the Stonesaw Mines to Freshport to warn his brother, Dunnan, of the danger facing the second runestone.
2	2	"The Stonesaw Mines"	Chelsea Peretti	Dominic Polcino	Spencer Crittenden	July 14, 2016
Fondue, Boneweevil, and Beor reach the ruined Stonesaw Mines, where they meet the dwarven monk Deepak Chopra (Chelsea Peretti). She is the lone survivor after one of the arcane horrors attacked the mine. Deepak leads them to a volcanic forge, where they procure new equipment. One of the abominations manifests there, and takes demonic control over Deepak's body. She assaults the party, which causes Fondue to abandon them and retreat, only for Deepak to give chase. Beor catches up to them and impales Deepak, killing her and the demon within. Soon after, the party discovers a mineshaft elevator. It takes them out of the mines to find the port town of Freshport just ahead.
3	3	"Welcome to Freshport"	Steve Agee	Larry Houston	Spencer Crittenden	July 14, 2016
Exiting the Stonesaw Mines, Fondue, Boneweevil, and Beor soon find themselves in Freshport, where they are welcomed by an eager hellspawn bard named Tech Powers (Steve Agee). Tech sneaks the party inside the Union House after being denied entrance by a guard. The party tracks down Dunnan in the study where he discloses that he has traded the second runestone to the cultists for the safety of his own family. He also reveals that the necklace around Beor's neck is the third runestone, which he tries to take by force, with the help of summoned monsters. Tech also turns on the group, after being offered a job in the dockworker's union. During the battle the study catches fire and the monsters and Dunnan are slaughtered. Tech, feeling guilty after betraying the trio, leads them to a window overlooking the Durnam Sea harbor. Fondue and Tech kiss before Tech leaves to distract the guards, giving the party time to escape into the cargo hold of a passing trading vessel.
4	4	"Across the Durnam Sea"	Ron Funches	Dominic Polcino	Spencer Crittenden	July 14, 2016
On the trade ship, the party meets the ship's captain, famed buccaneer Rib Sanchez. (Ron Funches) The party takes an instant liking to Rib, who welcomes them aboard as his guests. A gang of adaro arrive to take over the ship. Battle ensues (with Rib and his crew assisting the party), but is interrupted by the arrival of Vortheon who crashes his vessel into the side of Rib's ship, causing the adaro to retreat in a panic. Vortheon summons the second arcane horror to attack the party. It nearly kills Rib, but is ultimately struck down by Boneweevil. Vortheon still ensnares the party in magical bindings, and steals Beor's runestone. The group (save for Rib, who is allowed to go free) is led onto Vortheon's ship which leaves for Manoa.
5	5	"Manoa Prison Hole"	Aubrey Plaza	Larry Houston	Spencer Crittenden	July 14, 2016
The party is taken to the Manoa Prison Hole to be held captive. After Vortheon leaves, the party meets their cellmate, a gnome alchemist named Hawaiian Coffee (Aubrey Plaza). With her help, the party lures guards into their cell and takes them out. Hawaiian Coffee then leads the party through the Manoa Prison to the evidence locker on the top floor. Hawaiian Coffee recovers her potion-and-bomb-making kit, and the rest of the party recovers their weapons. Hawaiian Coffee hits Boneweevil with a potion that makes him shrink down to 1/8th of his size for no discernible reason. Prison guards find them then. The party escapes out the nearest window, while Hawaiian Coffee distracts the guards by blowing herself up. The party quickly leaves, venturing into the Sandman Desert.
6	6	"Entering the Sandman Desert"	John Hodgman	Dominic Polcino	Spencer Crittenden	July 14, 2016
Fondue, Boneweevil and Beor search for the Doorest of Fores that lies just at the edge of the desert. As they wander they come across a peddler's caravan under attack by wraiths. The owner of the caravan, a sorcerer named Hohn Jodgman, (John Hodgman) offers them money and food if they save him and escort him to the Doorest of Fores. They force the wraiths to retreat, and then the party sets off with Hohn and his caravan. The party encounters the wraiths a second time, but once again drives them off. The battle ends with Boneweevil being restored to his natural height. The next day the wraiths arrive once again only to reveal that they are actually people and that Hohn kidnapped members of their desert tribe and transformed them with his wand into sandwiches to sell them as slaves in the next town. Boneweevil disarms Hohn of his "Wand of Sandwich", while Fondue and Beor attack and subdue him. Having taken a liking to Hohn, and feeling bad about the prospect of killing him, Fondue offers him his life if he transforms all of the remaining sandwiches back into people. Hohn agrees. With that, the group parts ways with the desert tribe and Hohn's caravan, and enter the Doorest of Fores.
7	7	"The Doorest of Fores"	Thomas Middleditch	Larry Houston	Spencer Crittenden	July 14, 2016
Scouting through the Doorest of Fores, the group runs across a strange, tiny man named Dildo Bogpelt (Thomas Middleditch), who befriends them and agrees to help them navigate the Doorest, and seek out its guardian, Clarence. Along the way they run into multiple riddles and puzzles in the woods, before making their way to the center of the Doorest. In the center they find Clarence, the guardian of the woods, manifested as an anthropomorphic flower, and later an ent. Clarence assigns the party a series of trials of self-discovery, which they pass easily. Clarence congratulates them for being true heroes, and clears a path to their next destination. Dildo disappears leaving only a trace of pipe smoke, leaving the party to enter the Dragon's Temple on their own.
8	8	"The Dragon's Temple"	Kumail Nanjiani	Dominic Polcino	Spencer Crittenden	July 14, 2016
The party enters the Dragon's Temple to find it abandoned except for a lone kobold custodian, named Eddie Lizzard (Kumail Nanjiani) who agrees to help them make their way through the temple. He proves to be more of a hindrance as he repeatedly tricks them into giving him their gold (and sexual favors in the case of Fondue). They come upon an idol in the shape of a dragon's egg, which helps solve a myriad of puzzles and traps as they continue. Along the way they find "master sage," a plant known for its properties in purging evil spirits. They then come upon a pedestal set before a gigantic dragon statue, upon which they place the idol. The statue shoots magical fire at the egg-shaped idol, which causes it to hatch and grow into a full-sized dragon. As they witness this, the third arcane horror bursts into the temple and possesses the dragon. Boneweevil assaults the dragon with master sage, forcing the demon out of the dragon's body. The abomination ultimately crumbles to black dust after Boneweevil shoots it with an arrow laced with more master sage. The dragon leaves the temple, revealing the door to the cult of the Manticore's innermost sanctum. Eddie Lizzard parts ways with the group, taking all of their gold with him.
9	9	"The Secret Hideout"	River Butcher	Larry Houston	Spencer Crittenden	July 14, 2016
As the party makes their way deeper into the cult's hideout, Fondue discovers the sword he picked up in the Stonesaw Mines is enchanted with the spirit of a spectral paladin, named James Dean (River Butcher). The party finds the cultists pouring buckets of blood into a large basin in the center of the chambers, as well as drawing runes and reagents around it. The lead cultist explains they are using a combination of blood magic and the runestones' power to summon an extra-dimensional portal for the Manticore. The cultists gradually fall, but are interrupted by the return of Vortheon, who siphons the blood of the fallen cultists into the basin. The party eventually defeats Vortheon, aided by James Dean's holy magic, but Vortheon sacrifices himself to fill the last of the basin with his own blood. The ritual is completed, and the Great Manticore emerges from a dark portal and incapacitates the party. The Manticore announces its intention to return to Earthscar Village to tear open another demon portal. As it takes flight, Fondue tosses the sword containing James Dean at the Manticore, but only lodges it into its anus. As the sword goes farther away from the group, James Dean slowly fades out of existence.
10	10	"Earthscar Village"	Matt Gourley and Nathan Fillion	Dominic Polcino	Spencer Crittenden	July 14, 2016
As the party watches the Manticore fly off into the distance, they discover the runestones were left behind. They use them to open another portal which takes them back to Earthscar, ahead of the Manticore. There they find themselves face to face with Fondue's father, Chadge (Matt Gourley), who joins the group, hoping to make up for abandoning Fondue as a child. They search the village to warn the chief, only to discover that an elf named Teddar Spice (Nathan Fillion) has replaced the original chief. Teddar joins the group as they go in search of the original chief, Sandy Michael, who knows more about the power of the runestones. Sandy comes up with a plan to use the runestones to open a portal, force the Manticore through it, and then re-seal it before more demons can escape. The Manticore eventually arrives, leaving the party to distract the Manticore while Sandy Michael prepares the seal. Though the party fights valiantly, they can't bring the Manticore towards the portal. Determined to make it up to his son, Chadge tries to drag the Manticore into the portal with himself. Through combined efforts of Chadge, Boneweevil, and the newly returned blue dragon the Manticore is forced into the portal, which closes, trapping all four on the other side. Fondue and Beor, are left to mourn the loss of their friend. In a mid-credits scene, it's revealed that both Boneweevil and the dragon, Charles, survived the trip through the portal, and have banded together to search for a way back.

=== Season 2 (2017) ===
No. overall	No. in season	Title	Guest	Directed by	Written by	Original release date
11	1	"The Quest Continues"	Gillian Jacobs	Lucas Gray	Spencer Crittenden	September 15, 2017
One year after the onslaught of the Great Manticore at Earthscar Village, Fondue Zoobag, Beor O'Shift, and a new goblin rogue companion named Chip (Gillian Jacobs) are scaling the Thunderbluff Mountains in search of Celty Cerrilian, the Sorcerer of the Storm. They have spent the last year searching for a way to free Boneweevil from the Demon Realm. Meanwhile, Boneweevil and Charles the Dragon have survived in the Demon Realm by eating demon flesh. Boneweevil has given up hope of being rescued by Fondue and Beor. In the Thunderbluffs, Fondue, Beor, and Chip find Celty. She agrees to help the group in exchange for assisting her in locating the Diadem of Etylai, which is locked in the Demon Vaults. Celty conjures a portal to the Demon Realm and hands Fondue a scroll, written in an unintelligible language, saying that it will help them return to the Material Plane if they are separated. Reaching the entrance to the Demon Vaults, Chip trips an alarm and three hulking demons soon appear, and one grabs Celty. As they fight, Boneweevil and Charles approach the battle. An elated Beor greets them by hurling Chip with his spear at Celty's demon captor. As the demon retreats with Celty and Chip, Celty chants a spell and a spherical explosion envelops them all, then disappears, leading Chip and Celty to a grim fate, and leaving Fondue, Beor, Boneweevil, and Charles trapped in the Demon Realm.
12	2	"Demon Realm Devilry"	Rory Scovel	Dominic Polcino	Spencer Crittenden	September 15, 2017
After a tense reunion with Boneweevil and being introduced to Charles, there is an explosion from deep within the Demon Vaults. Charles flies them all clear and the Vault sinks into the molten river. They fly into a cloud of noxious fumes. Charles goes faint and the four plunge headlong into a swamp. The party each feel the swamp water changing their bodies, turning Beor into a wolf, Fondue into a penguin, Boneweevil into a lion, and Charles into a trout. They are immediately happened upon by an acquaintance of Boneweevil's, Krandrelarius (Rory Scovel), an unpredictable swamp witch with a mutating name. Boneweevil asks if Krandilarius knows a potion recipe that can revert them to their normal forms, which he does. However, he is missing the final ingredient: Panacilius, a rare flower with magical properties that grows in the swamp. They wend their way through puzzle paths and acid pools to find a cliff covered in a thick Panacilius patch. Krendrilarius completes the potion and the affected party members are returned to their original forms. Fondue asks Quadrilarius if he can read the scroll left them by Celty; he awkwardly admits he cannot and then equally awkwardly demands their souls. Charles deadpans the suggestion that they just leave and the four fly away, leaving an indignant Quandralarius behind.
13	3	"Bonebreak Village"	Aparna Nancherla	Lucas Gray	Spencer Crittenden	September 22, 2017
In search of anyone who can read Celty's scroll, the party travel to Bonebreak Village, a township of the Demon Realm's survivors. Charles dislikes Bonebreak and opts to sit the visit out, but leaves Boneweevil with his dragon whistle so that they can call him later for backup. After Charles drops them off, the party meet Bowflex Devrye (Aparna Nancherla), who is searching for a polyglot soul. The party offer their help and they follow screams toward a large stone barracks. They infiltrate the barracks and their search leads them to the spirit of Bowflex's partner Spencer, the polyglot she has been searching for. As they attempt to make their escape, an alarm is sounded. Boneweevil blows his whistle, anticipating the need for Charles. They escape the barracks, but the tormentor garrison that mans the barracks begins a flying blitz on Bonebreak Village, massacring its inhabitants. The party manages to escort Spencer just outside the village, who – now relatively safe – admits that he is, in fact, quite illiterate and incapable of reading the scroll. However, he tells them of another potential way out: If they can defeat the Caretaker of the Abyss “using mortal hands,” they will be released back to the Material Plane. The episode ends as the Bonebreak carnage closes in on them, and Charles is nowhere to be seen.
14	4	"Into the Abyss"	Paul Scheer	Dominic Polcino	Spencer Crittenden	September 29, 2017
Still threatened by the destruction of Bonebreak Village, Boneweevil notices that Charles has failed to answer the dragon whistle. As the tormentors close in, the party are rescued by another of Boneweevil's Demon Realm friends, the toothbeast Sensodyne (Paul Scheer). The party enlist his help in getting to the Abyss. Upon arriving, they are soon met by the Caretaker of the Abyss, and challenge him to compete in games for their freedom. The party ultimately loses their initial challenge, but, in the studio, Spencer suddenly realizes that they hadn't agreed on what the Caretaker would get if he won, so the Caretaker agrees to a stalemate based on faulty parameters. The party seize the opportunity to half-suggest, half-force a new challenge: scroll reading. The Caretaker reads the scroll out loud, causing it to pulsate with energy and disintegrate, with no effect on the Caretaker. With the scroll now wasted and the Caretaker accurately insulting the party's intelligence, a fight breaks out. Boneweevil eventually notices the Caretaker's reflection in the surface of the Abyss above them. Remembering the spirit Spencer's advice, Boneweevil uses his Boots of Mad Hops to leap up and grab the ankle of the Caretaker's “reflection” with his own mortal goblin hands. Fondue and Beor follow suit and drag the true Caretaker from the Abyss and onto an equal footing with the party. The battle culminates in a spectacular vital strike from Sensodyne and the Caretaker is defeated. As the body of the Caretaker shrivels and crumbles, gravity suddenly inverts and the party begin falling rapidly upwards through the eternal darkness of the Abyss toward what they can only assume is the Material Plane.
15	5	"Back to Sandman Desert"	Patton Oswalt	Lucas Gray	Spencer Crittenden	October 6, 2017
The regulars land in the vast expanse of the Sandman Desert. Since their visit here the previous year, the desert has changed: numerous tall, stone obelisks with magical orbs atop now dot the landscape, accompanied by cracks and fissures filled with magma in the earth. They intervene in a virch attack on a group of sand nomads and meet Sandpole (Patton Oswalt), a very young half-orc sand mage. During the battle, Boneweevil's demon sword absorbs the blood of a slain virch, imbuing it with an ominous aura. Sandpole invites them back to their village for tea in gratitude and introduces the group to his grandmother, who reveals to them that the obelisks and fissures that mar the land are the work of a demon witch named Celty, who wields the Diadem of Etylai and dwells in floating castle, and the party realizes they may have once again unwittingly aided a powerful secret enemy. Boneweevil's demon sword suddenly breaks free of its scabbard and begins attacking wildly, killing several animals and villagers and bullying Fondue, who walks away sulking. The demon sword mortally wounds Sandpole, drinking a large portion of his blood and finally morphing from a demon sword into a large sword demon. Boneweevil manages to get in close and stab it and Beor cleaves it in half with Only Friend, finishing it off. The dying sword demon taunts that Celty will bring about the end of the world. Beor heals Sandpole's wounds with her runestone amulet. Fondue, trudging away in depression, sees a lattice of magical energy forming between the obelisks and flowing in the direction of Forlona, the capital of the continent.
16	6	"The Barely Cursed Bazaar of Commerce"	Janet Varney	Dominic Polcino	Spencer Crittenden	October 13, 2017
As Beor and Boneweevil catch up with Fondue, the Sandman Desert deteriorates further, as various demonkind escape into the world. The party approaches the capital city of Forlona, but are halted by a vast river of magma. Fortuitously, they happen upon a small, oddly new-looking tent on the volcanic shore bearing a sign with the episode title, subtitled "Everything in stock". They enter the bazaar and meet a dwarf sorceress named Sedona (Janet Varney). When asked for a way across the magma, Sedona suggests a "fold-a-boat", a magical, lava-proof boat that folds to pocket size, but asserts she has misplaced hers on account of the item's diminutiveness. Boneweevil examines The Manifest, a sentient inventory ledger, which suggests they investigate the back room. Sedona is suspiciously hesitant, claiming to have booby-trapped the back of her store; when the party insist on searching it, they discover another Sedona, tied up and locked in a trunk. Beor frees the real Sedona while Fondue tackles the fleeing imposter, who morphs into a demon. Sedona ultimately dispatches her doppelganger with a lightning bolt to the teeth, and, in gratitude for their intervention, bestow upon the party her lava-proof fold-a-boat. Leaving, Fondue trips over the half-buried hilt of a familiar orichalcum blade, the magical bastard sword he had lost in the Great Manticore's anus one year prior.
17	7	"The City of Forlona"	Jason Mantzoukas	Lucas Gray	Spencer Crittenden	October 20, 2017
The party arrive in the Capital City of Forlona and meet a beggar child who introduces himself as Gribble Grabble (Jason Mantzoukas). He tells the party of a massive keystone obelisk that appeared without warning three weeks before in the western quarter of the city, from which pours lightning and various monsters. In the commotion he was separated from his parents and the quarter was sealed off by order of the King. Several townsfolk recognize Fondue and Beor as saviors of the realm from the Great Manticore, while ignoring Boneweevil's contribution. Disgruntled and envious, Boneweevil offers to help Gribble Grabble find his parents in the western quarter. The group go to the Royal Palace to ask permission from the King of Forlona, but find it strictly guarded. Inciting a riot to distract the guards and slip inside, they reach the throne room, only for Gribble Grabble to reveal himself as a gnome assassin named "Grabble Gribble", who attempts to assassinate the King and seize his throne. The party block him, but discover in the struggle that the King is already dead. An old woman named Feldspar, the King's Vizier, emerges and explains that the King had committed suicide the day the obelisk appeared, but that she kept his death a secret for fear of succeeding him and becoming a target for assassination. Grabble Gribble becomes the de facto king and strikes a truce with the party, offering them knighthoods and resources in exchange for saving his newly acquired kingdom from Celty.
18	8	"The Keystone Obelisk"	Elizabeth Olsen	Dominic Polcino	Spencer Crittenden	October 27, 2017
Now Knights of Forlona, the party are told that the obelisk is channeling mana from the other obelisks surrounding the city and down into the earth for some unknown purpose. To destroy it, Feldspar introduces the party to Prisoner 84, a half-elf arsonist named Stirrup (Elizabeth Olsen), an explosives expert serving a sentence for multiple acts of destruction. Given four limited-use rings of Featherfall and catapulted to the roof of the obelisk, they find a welded hatch that Stirrup blows open. Inside they stumble through a puzzle involving a magical mirror and eventually reach the obelisk's power source and destroy it, blowing the four of them clear and crumbling the obelisk. As they float to the ground, Boneweevil is lauded by a crowd, which disparages Fondue and Beor as "old news." As the lattice of energy overhead dissipates and the obelisk network goes dark, Celty's floating castle appears and fires a giant beam of destructive magic at the Royal Palace, destroying it entirely, and beginning a hostile takeover of Forlona City.
19	9	"The Castle of Etylai"	Rob Corddry	Lucas Gray	Spencer Crittenden	November 3, 2017
Under siege by Celty's flying fortress and countless automata, the party is saved when Charles suddenly appears, ridden by a brawny barbarian named Sandy (Rob Corddry). Beor recognizes him as a member of her Skulltree Clan and as an old flame. Charles announces that the boundary between the material plane and the Demon Realm is crumbling fast; mounting Charles, they make for the flying castle, which has meanwhile formed an energy bubble around the city. Inside the castle the party splits; Fondue and Boneweevil come to blows in one area while Beor and Sandy flirt in another. The two pairs reunite in a council chamber where four regal corpses sit before a large rune-covered door. The united party attempts to heave it open, but it is a trap — the burning runes attach themselves to Beor, Fondue, and Sandy, though Boneweevil evades. Beor barely survives, but Sandy and Fondue are reduced to smoldering corpses.
20	10	"The Sorcerer of the Storm"	Kumail Nanjiani	Dominic Polcino	Spencer Crittenden	November 17, 2017
The golden-glowing form of Fondue materializes from his orichalcum blade, which has captured his spirit as a spectral paladin. The door is then bashed open by a hulking mechanical golem piloted by Eddie Lizzard (Kumail Nanjiani). With Beor carrying Fondue's corpse, Lizzard and the party team up and head to the great hall of the castle where they find Celty hysterical with rage. Battle ensues, eventually flinging them onto a balcony outside, where a storm rages as Celty floats above, firing lightning at them. Charles appears to protect the heroes from the lightning, and Celty is bested. Fondue and Boneweevil insist on reviving her to defeat her over and over, irritating Lizzard to the point that he buffs her, makes her invisible, and gives her the control of his golem. Spectral Fondue uses his ghost vision to locate the invisible witch and lands a final critical shot to her throat. Before dying, Celty reveals that the demon rifts are the result of their having destroyed the Caretaker of the Abyss and that her obelisk network was all that was keeping the Demon Realm and the Material Plane from converging. As the energy bubble surrounding Forlona dissipates, the party sees that the world outside has become a hellscape. A pre-end-credit sequence shows an animated short, in the style of the intro to an Eighties sitcom entitled Celty and Chip, that depicts the non-canon adventures of Celty, Chip, the large red demon (credited as "Gordon the Demon"), the Baba-Yaga, and the Caretaker.

=== Season 3 (2019) ===
No. overall	No. in season	Title	Guest	Directed by	Written by	Original release date
21	1	"Goblopolis Lost"	Matt Gourley	Dominic Polcino	Spencer Crittenden	August 18, 2019
2 years have passed since the convergence between the material plane and the demon realm. Beor and Boneweevil, with Fondue still dead and his soul trapped in a sword, have been trying to find their way, saving who they can and smiting all the evil they encounter. With the help of Chadge Zoobag, they venture to defeat the Puppet King, a powerful fiend that has taken control of the goblin city of Goblopolis. After finding a hidden passage into the city, our heroes find themselves outnumbered by a horde of controlled goblins where Chadge throws the sword holding Fondue's spirit accidentally over a cliff, and outnumbered until help arrives by means of a hooded figure who at first doesn't reveal his true name. After spending 4 months attempting to recover Fondue, they continue on to the throne room of the puppet king, and after destroying him, the mysterious ally reveals himself to be a revived Lymric, Beor's once deceased brother, who has come to bring Beor home to help save their people whom have fallen in these dark times.
22	2	"The Shattered Myriad"	Kate Micucci	Frank Marino	Spencer Crittenden	August 25, 2019
With Limerick in tow our heroes venture towards their Barbarian home, but pass through a magical catastrophe on pause, where they meet a strange Druid and discover the secrets of this land, as well as a possible solution to undoing the havoc they've inadvertently wrought, the demonic convergence.
23	3	"Ivory Quay"	Tawny Newsome	Dominic Polcino	Spencer Crittenden	September 1, 2019
Our heroes arrive at the Barbarian Village, but all is not right, as an old friend reveals. The gang finds the village under the thrall of demons, sorcery, and strange gemstones, and as they search for the Beast of Beginning, they are waylaid by an inscrutable, otherworldly specter of vengeance.
24	4	"Goblopolis Found"	Reggie Watts	Frank Marino	Spencer Crittenden	September 8, 2019
After using the Beast of Beginning, our heroes find themselves in the past, in a world untouched by the demonic convergence. But all is not right, as they learn they've arrived right at the point in time when the Puppet King is laying siege to Goblopolis, intending to enslave the city's goblins on the road to world domination.
25	5	"Terra Scissus"	Joel Kim Booster	Dominic Polcino	Spencer Crittenden	September 15, 2019
Forced underground by the Puppet King's assault, our heroes are trapped with an army of hungry goblins. With the help of a sassy new ally, the gang adventures through flooded caverns choked by fungus as they try to find a way out of their cavernous captivity.
26	6	"Shatternine Village"	Jared Logan	Frank Marino	Spencer Crittenden	September 22, 2019
On their journey back to Ivory to seek the beast of Beginning, our heroes rest in Shatternine Village, where another adventuring party has been set to work helping the town uncover the source of a mysterious rage virus infecting the town with violent madness.
27	7	"The Bloody Teeth"	D'Arcy Carden	Dominic Polcino	Spencer Crittenden	September 29, 2019
Our heroes return to Ivory Quay, but the bone tree barbarian's ancestral home has been warped, corrupted beyond recognition. The gang fights their way to the Beast of Beginning, disgusted and confused at the horrors their temporal tampering has unleashed.
28	8	"Ad Quod Damnum"	Jessica McKenna	Dominic Polcino	Spencer Crittenden	October 6, 2019
After being captured by the Gray Wraith, our heroes find themselves in an otherworldly plane of Imperium Judgments! There they face trial at the hands of a stern prosecutor, an impenetrable judge, and the help of a plucky and charming defense attorney.
29	9	"The Starshade Expanse"	Carl Tart	Dominic Polcino	Spencer Crittenden	October 13, 2019
After escaping Ad Quod Damnum, the plane of Imperium Judgements, our heroes are lost in the astral plane, unable to find the Beast of Beginning, but find a helping hand in the form of an Astral Privateer, who offers them a ride through dimensions, as well as a new type of pizza.
30	10	"The Virtuous Harmony"	Tom Kenny	Dominic Polcino	Spencer Crittenden	October 20, 2019
Our heroes crash land in the virtuous harmony, where an angelic guardian helps them find the Beast of the beginning, and the gang fights an old foe over the fate of the multiverse.

== Production ==
=== Development ===
Prior to the creation of HarmonQuest, Harmon had included a Dungeons & Dragons-style segment, hosted by Crittenden, at the end of the weekly podcast Harmontown. When Harmon pitched the idea of HarmonQuest, which was originally conceived as a low-budget online show, NBC Universal executive vice-president of digital enterprises Evan Shapiro became interested in the idea. When Seeso was developed as an NBC-owned comedy channel, an order for ten episodes of HarmonQuest was confirmed. The show is produced by Universal Cable Productions and Starburns Industries.

=== Filming and animation ===
The show is recorded in front of a live audience at Victory Studios in Glendale, California, with parts of the stories being animated later. Filming typically takes place over an hour, which is then edited down to the 25-minute runtime. Harmon has cited The Ricky Gervais Show as an influence, as it also features a mix of live and animated footage.

== Reception ==
The series has been likened to Critical Role, a web series streaming on Twitch and later uploaded to the Geek & Sundry YouTube channel since 2015. Unlike Critical Role episodes which are long-form, full-play D&D podcasts often exceeding four hours, HarmonQuest has been praised for its accessibility towards casual and beginner audiences. Javon Phillips of The Los Angeles Times said, "The show makes its ventures a lot less time-consuming and ups the watchability quotient by throwing in animated segments in digestible half-hour episodes. Gamemaster Spencer Crittenden approaches the show as just that — a show. It's not just players playing the game and showing off their multi-sided dice-rolling skills."

== See also ==
- Critical Role
- The Adventure Zone
