= The Sims Spark'd =

2020 American TV series

- Promotional poster
- Genre: Reality competition
- Created by: Evan Denbaum; Michael Duke
- Inspired by: The Sims 4 by Electronic Arts
- Presented by: Rayvon Owen
- Judges: Dave Miotke; Kelsey Impicciche; Tayla Parx
- Country of origin: United States
- No. of seasons: 1
- No. of episodes: 4

Production
- Executive producers: Joseph R. Lynch; Evan Denbaum; Michael Duke; Sheila Judkins; Allison Tom; Richard Hall; Michael Hughes; Greg C. Lake
- Camera setup: Multi-camera

Original release
- Network: TBS
- Release: July 17 – August 7, 2020

The Sims Spark'd is a reality competition television series that premiered on the TBS network on July 17, 2020. The first season of the series, filmed from December 9 to 14, 2019, features 12 contestants, selected from those known to feature The Sims in their online gaming channels, tasked with challenges within The Sims 4 to create characters and stories following the challenge's themes and limitations. Each competitor's creation is judged by a panel consisting of EA Maxis developer and The Sims 4 producer Dave Miotke (known as "SimGuruNinja" within the Sims community), YouTube personality Kelsey Impicciche (known for her "100 Baby Challenge"), and singer-songwriter Tayla Parx, who is also a voice actress in The Sims 4. The series is hosted by American Idol season 14 finalist Rayvon Owen.

Each episode of the first season premiered on TBS on Friday nights at 11pm ET/PT in the United States, and was later uploaded on YouTube channel BuzzFeed Multiplayer the following Monday for international audiences at 8am Eastern. Challenges were posted to The Sims 4 website following the series premiere to seek potential contestants for a second season.

== Format ==
At the beginning of the competition, all 12 contestants were assigned to teams via random draw. Each team is composed of a Stylist (handling the designs), Builder (in charge of buildings), and the Storyteller (invents the stories related to Sims). For every episode, they have to fulfill specific challenges as a team based around several scenarios.

== Cast ==
Contestant	Team	Skill	Result
xMiraMira	Team Llama	Stylist	Winner
SimLicy	Team Llama	Builder	Winner
DrGluon	Team Llama	Storyteller	Winner
LittleSiha	Team Cowplant	Stylist	Runner-up
Doctor Ashley	Team Cowplant	Builder	Runner-up
The English Simmer	Team Gnome Ep1-2; Team Cowplant Ep3-4^{a}	Storyteller	Runner-up
Steph0Sims	Team Cowplant	Storyteller	Withdrew
Plumbella	Team Gnome	Stylist	Eliminated
Simproved	Team Gnome	Builder	Eliminated
xUrbanSimsx	Team Freezer Bunny	Stylist	Eliminated
SpringSims	Team Freezer Bunny	Builder	Eliminated
DeeSims	Team Freezer Bunny	Storyteller	Eliminated

=== Notes ===
- ^ a Due to Steph0Sims' withdrawal from the competition, the producers invited the previously-eliminated Storyteller, the English Simmer, to join Team Cowplant.

== Challenge Results ==
Team	Episode 1		Episode 2		Episode 3	Episode 4
Team	Skill	Elimination	Skill	Elimination	Skill	Final
Llama	Safe	Bottom 2	3rd	Won	5/9 votes	Won
Cowplant	Safe	Safe	Won	Bottom 2	4/9 votes	Runner-up
Gnome	Won	Won	2nd	Eliminated		
Freezer Bunny	Safe	Eliminated				

== Episodes ==
Each episode premiered on TBS on Friday nights at 11pm ET/PT and on YouTube channel BuzzFeed Multiplayer the following Monday at 8am Eastern.

No.	Title	Original release date	YouTube air date
1	Episode 1	July 17, 2020	July 20, 2020
Twelve Sims influencers are divided into four teams and must work together to compete in their first skills and elimination challenges.: Skills Challenge - Inspiration: Teams must create a story inspired by items chosen by racing against each other on foot. (Time limit: 90 minutes); Elimination Challenge - Family: Teams must create a family of 4 Sims and build their house within the Willow Creek neighborhood. Teams must then create a short video presentation showing the backstory of their family. The winning team in this challenge gets their family featured in The Sims 4. (Time limit: 5 hours)
2	Episode 2	July 24, 2020	July 27, 2020
The three remaining teams compete in the second round of challenges.: Skills Challenge - Parenthood: Teams must create 3 Sims and show each of them growing up in the toddler, child and teenage life stages, with unique rooms to match their personalities. (Time limit: 2 hours); Elimination Challenge - Supernatural: Based on the ranking from the Skills Challenge, teams took turns choosing content packs to use. Using these packs alone, teams must create a video inspired by science fiction or fantasy. (Time limit: 6 hours, split across 2 days)
3	Episode 3	July 31, 2020	August 3, 2020
The two remaining teams compete in head-to-head Skills Challenges.: Stylist Challenge - Gender Not Required: Stylists must create six Sim models of various shapes, sizes, genders and ethnicity and create a cohesive gender-fluid fashion collection for the Sims to showcase. (Time limit: 45 minutes); Builder Challenge - Unconventional Build: Builders must create a mode of transportation with unconventional materials. (Time limit: 45 minutes); Storyteller Challenge - Sell That Fixer-Upper: Storytellers must improvise their way through a live real-estate walk-through of a house with messes, broken objects and other surprises, controlled by judge Dave Miotke.; Note: In between the Builder and the Storyteller challenges, Steph0Sims withdrew from the competition, unable to handle the pressure of the challenge and not wanting to continue without her friends in Team Gnome who were eliminated in the previous episode. As a result, the producers invited The English Simmer to join Team Cowplant.
4	Episode 4	August 7, 2020	August 10, 2020
The two remaining teams compete in their final challenge.: Final Challenge - Play With Life: Teams must find a common thread with each other among the reasons why they play The Sims, and use that to create a video narrative with three Sims and a build. (Time limit: 15 minutes prep time, 6 hours to create the video)

== Development ==
As a project in planning, Spark'd had a long lead time as Electronic Arts wanted to combine the players' personal stories with a TV reality format filled with challenges. The company decided to make the show in-house instead of outsourcing it to anyone else. EA was worried about the specifics of translating a video game into another medium, and thus tried not to diverge from the main aspects of The Sims while putting an effort to represent diversity. The initial idea was to develop Spark'd as a short-length show for the millennials. However, after the initial filming in December 2019, the COVID-19 pandemic prompted EA to retool their marketing plans from scratch. The Sims Spark'd was found to be a fit for a TBS's ELeague Friday programming block change to include shows that are not just aimed at dedicated gamers.

During and following the broadcast of the first season, EA posted Spark'd challenges on The Sims 4 website for players to complete in-game and upload to the website for the opportunity to be selected for a potential second season of The Sims Spark'd.
