= Kelsey Impicciche =

American YouTuber (born 1991)

- Born: July 11, 1991 (age 35)

YouTube information
- Channel: Kelsey Impicciche
- Genre: Gaming
- Subscribers: 1 million
- Views: 153 million
- Last updated: 3 February 2026
- Website: https://www.kelseyimpicciche.com/

Kelsey Impicciche is an American YouTuber and novelist. She made gaming content on BuzzFeed Multiplayer before leaving the company in 2021. She is known for her videos in which she completed the '100 Baby Challenge' in The Sims 4.

== Career ==
Impicciche worked for BuzzFeed and, in 2017, helped to develop BuzzFeed Multiplayer, a YouTube channel of BuzzFeed focused on gaming. Beginning in December 2018, she created a video series for Multiplayer in which she played the '100 Baby Challenge' in The Sims 4. This series was titled, Single Girl Tries The 100 Baby Challenge. The challenge requires the player to have a Sim give birth to 100 babies, each from a different partner, in as few generations as possible.

In 2020, Impicciche was a judge on the reality show, The Sims Spark'd. She is also an ambassador for the online gaming community, Paidia.

Impicciche left BuzzFeed in March 2021 after finishing the 100 Baby Challenge. Prior to leaving, she began shifting her focus towards creating content on her personal channel, originally called Kelsey Dangerous. She later renamed the channel to Kelsey Impicciche. As of October 2024, Impicciche has over 900,000 subscribers on her YouTube channel and over 160,000 followers on Twitch. She also voices Boe in "The Land Of Boggs."

Impicciche began writing during the COVID-19 pandemic. Her debut book, a young adult mermaid romantic fantasy novel inspired by "The Little Mermaid" called, Voice of the Ocean, was published in 2025.
