= Dawn M. Bennett =

American voice actress (born 1992)

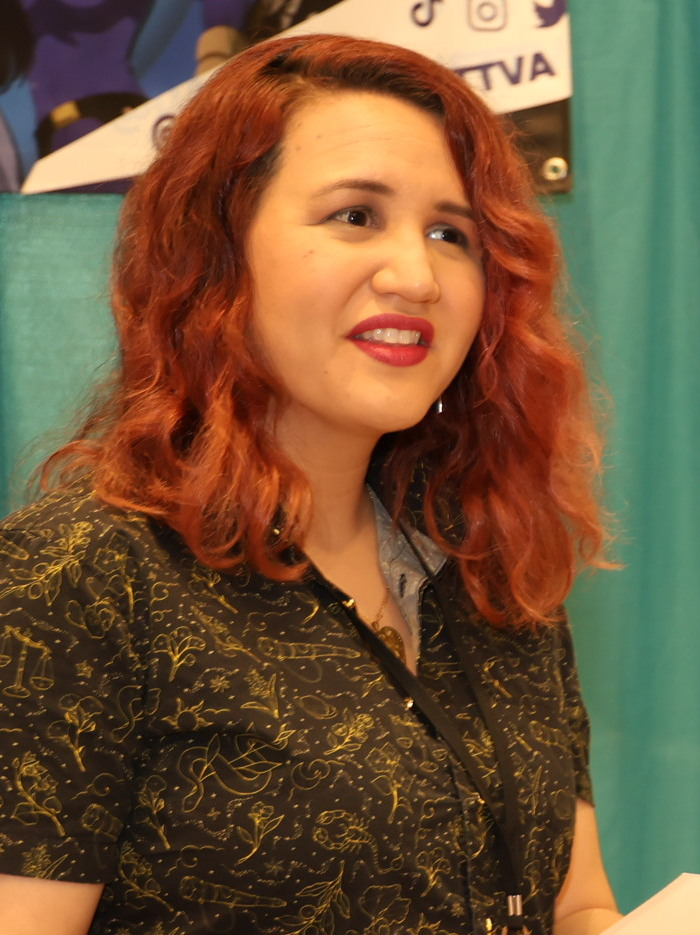
- Bennett at Animate! Raleigh in 2024
- Born: December 13, 1992 (age 33)
- Education: Berklee College of Music
- Occupation: Voice actress
- Years active: 2014–present
- Website: www.dawnmbennett.com

Dawn M. Bennett (born December 13, 1992) is an American voice actress, known for her work on English anime dubs, voicing Sody Pop in Chikn Nuggit, Zora Salazar in Epithet Erased, Nabbit in Super Mario Bros. Wonder, and Aigis in Persona 3 Reload.

== Career ==
While studying her first semester at Berklee College of Music, Bennett participated in an event in Berklee's Video Game Music Club. With voiceover as an option, she tried it and was later encouraged by the club's president to continue voice acting. Bennett went on to volunteer for engineering students' projects throughout her time in college, and shifted her focus from music to voice acting.

Bennett's first role with Funimation was announced in August 2014, when she joined the English dub cast of Fairy Tail as Frosch.

== Personal life ==
Bennett is of Filipino descent and her paternal grandfather was Ashkenazi Jewish. She has attention deficit hyperactivity disorder, anxiety, and depression. On the last day of Pride Month 2024, Bennett came out as asexual, specifically identifying as demisexual.

== Filmography ==
=== Anime series ===
List of voice performances in anime series
Year	Title	Role	Notes	Ref.
2014	Fairy Tail	Frosch	First Funimation role	
2015	Sky Wizards Academy	Rico Flamel	Main role	
2015	Shomin Sample	Sumire Kiryū		
2015	Dance with Devils	Ritsuka Tachibana	Lead role	
2016	Garo: The Animation	Esmeralda		
2016	Hundred	Karen Kisaragi		
2016	First Love Monster	Chiaki Yokouchi		
2016	Puzzle & Dragons X	Hal		
2016	Castle Town Dandelion	Reiko Saotome		
2016	Bikini Warriors	Dark Elf	Main role	
2016	Three Leaves, Three Colors	Asako Kondo, Eternal		
2016	Tales of Zestiria the X	Ganette		
2016	Touken Ranbu: Hanamaru	Hotarumaru		
2016	Keijo!!!!!!!!	Miku Kobayakawa		
2016	Show By Rock!! Season 2	A		
2016	All Out!!	Ririn		
2016	Overlord	Bukubuku Chagama		
2017	Dragon Ball Super	Kale, Kelfa, Fairy C		
2017	Chaos;Child	Mio		
2017	Akiba's Trip: The Animation	Kikuchi		
2017	Nanbaka	Noriko	Season 2	
2017	Trickster	Yoshio's Mom		
2017	ēlDLIVE	Misuzu	Main role	
2017	Masamune-kun's Revenge	Kikune Kiba		
2017	Chain Chronicle: The Light of Haecceitas	Phoena		
2017	ACCA: 13-Territory Inspection Dept.	Ébène		
2017	Sakura Quest	Yuika		
2017	Brave Witches	Flight Sergeant Shimohara Sadako		
2017	Love Tyrant	Seiji's Mother		
2017	Seven Mortal Sins	Satan		
2017	KanColle: Kantai Collection	Hiei		
2017	Hyouka	Yuasa		
2017	Restaurant to Another World	Fardania		
2017	Hina Logic – from Luck & Logic	Karen		
2017	Gamers!	Niina Oiso		
2017	Tsuredure Children	Patricia Caulfield		
2017	Konohana Kitan	Satsuki	Main role	
2017	Black Clover	Sister Lily		
2017	Anime-Gataris	Minoa	Lead role	
2018–2025	My Hero Academia	Setsuna Tokage		
2018	Tokyo Ghoul:re	Shion Satomi		
2018	Hanebado!	Nagisa	Lead role	
2018	That Time I Got Reincarnated as a Slime	Shizue		
2018	Zombie Land Saga	Tae Yamada		
2018	Ace Attorney	Maggey	Season 2	
2018	RErideD: Derrida, who leaps through time	Marie		
2018	Conception	Capri		
2019	Boogiepop and Others	Additional Voices	4 episodes	
2019	YU-NO: A Girl Who Chants Love at the Bound of this World	Ayumi Arima		
2019	Kono Oto Tomare! Sounds of Life	Kou		
2019	Sarazanmai	Nyantaro		
2019	The Helpful Fox Senko-san	Yozora		
2019	Kemono Friends	Emperor		
2020	Pokémon: Twilight Wings	Marnie, Arctozolt, Wingull		
2020	Magia Record: Puella Magi Madoka Magica Side Story	Mitama Yakumo		
2020	The Misfit of Demon King Academy	Emilia Ludowell		
2020	Assault Lily Bouquet	Kaede Johan Nouvel	Main role	
2020	Yashahime: Princess Half-Demon	Kyūki, White Tiger Kyūki		
2020	Gleipnir	Hikawa		
2021	Tamayomi: The Baseball Girls	Shiragiku		
2021	Mars Red	Misaki		
2021	Wonder Egg Priority	Neiru	Main role	
2021	Dragon Goes House-Hunting	Albert		
2021	Muhyo & Roji's Bureau of Supernatural Investigation	Kenji		
2021	How a Realist Hero Rebuilt the Kingdom	Maria		
2021	Vinland Saga	Askeladd (child)		
2021	Pokémon Evolutions	Lusamine		
2021	King's Raid: Successors of the Will	Maria		
2021	Mieruko-chan	Mao		
2022	Tokyo 24th Ward	Kanae Suido		
2022	The Rising of the Shield Hero	Eclair Seaetto		
2022	Super Cub	Reiko		
2022	Ghost in the Shell: SAC_2045	Suzuka Mizukane		
2022	The Slime Diaries: That Time I Got Reincarnated as a Slime	Shizu		
2022	To Your Eternity	Hisame	Season 2	
2023	KonoSuba: An Explosion on This Wonderful World!	Arnes		
2023	Bastard!! Heavy Metal, Dark Fantasy	Marie	Season 2	
2024	Code Geass: Rozé of the Recapture	Yoko Araki		
2024	Fairy Tail: 100 Years Quest	Frosch		
2026	Sentenced to Be a Hero	Kivia		
2026	Playing Death Games to Put Food on the Table	Hakushi		

=== Animation ===
List of voice performances in animation
Year	Title	Role	Notes	Ref.
2017; 2019–present	RWBY	Elm Ederne, Ann Ren	Also singer	
2025	Musical Pipers: The Pied Piper	Wendy Finn, Dawson	Short film; also singer	

=== Film ===
List of voice performances in films
Year	Title	Role	Notes	Ref.
2017	Fairy Tail: Dragon Cry	Riana		
2018	Planetarian: Storyteller of the Stars	Jeremiah		
2018	Free! Take Your Marks	Veronica		
2019	City Hunter: Shinjuku Private Eyes	Rui Kisugi		
2021	Girls und Panzer das Finale	Ogin		
2022	Shin Ultraman	Hiroko Asami	English dub	
2024	Mobile Suit Gundam: Silver Phantom	Azami Meggineh	VR film	
2026	Cosmic Princess Kaguya!	Iroha		
2026	The Lovers	The Sirena		

=== Video games ===
List of voice performances in video games
Year	Title	Role	Notes	Ref.
2014–2020	Yandere Simulator	Hanako Yamada (Nemesis), Aoi Ryugoku, Asu Rito, Muja Kina	Pre-release demos	
2014	Freedom Planet	Sash Lilac		
2018	Dragon Ball Xenoverse 2	Kale, Kefla		
2019	Dragon Ball Legends	Kale, Kefla		
2019	Wargroove	Tenri		
2020	Dragon Ball FighterZ	Kale, Kefla		
2020	Granblue Fantasy Versus	Ilsa		
2020	The Legend of Heroes: Trails of Cold Steel IV	Mariabell Crois		
2021	Cris Tales	Rhallus		
2021	Tales of Luminaria	Michelle Bouquet		
2022	Fire Emblem Warriors: Three Hopes	Shez (Female)		
2022	Cookie Run: Kingdom	Twizzly Gummy Cookie, Linzer Cookie		
2022	Fortnite	The Herald		
2022	Freedom Planet 2	Sash Lilac		
2022	RWBY: Arrowfell	Elm Ederne		
2022	River City Girls 2	Kuniko, Megumi		
2023	Trinity Trigger	Noire, Fasti the Chronicler		
2023	Honkai: Star Rail	Yukong		
2023	Dark Deception: Monsters & Mortals	Hanako Yamada (Nemesis)	Archive audio	
2023	Rune Factory 3 Special	Kuruna		
2023	Rhapsody II: Ballad of the Little Princess	Akurjo, Myao Karkanski		
2023	Rhapsody III: Memories of Marl Kingdom	Elliese, Myao Karkanski, Akurjo		
2023	Anonymous;Code	Rosario Rosellini		
2023	Disgaea 7: Vows of the Virtueless	Rekka		
2023	Super Mario Bros. Wonder	Nabbit		
2023	Granblue Fantasy Versus: Rising	Ilsa		
2023	Teenage Mutant Ninja Turtles: Splintered Fate	Nobody		
2024	Persona 3 Reload	Aigis		
2024	Like a Dragon: Infinite Wealth	Additional voices		
2024	Unicorn Overlord	Amalia, Mercenaries (Type C), additional voices		
2024	Sand Land	General Rosetta		
2024	Honor of Kings	Erin, Athena		
2024	The Legend of Heroes: Trails Through Daybreak	Risette Twinings		
2024	Romancing SaGa 2: Revenge of the Seven	Minerva/Imperial Guard (F)		
2025	The Legend of Heroes: Trails Through Daybreak II	Risette Twinings, citizens		
2025	Like a Dragon: Pirate Yakuza in Hawaii	Additional voices		
2025	Raidou Remastered: The Mystery of the Soulless Army	Tae Asakura		
2025	Mario Kart World	Nabbit		
2025	Destiny 2: Renegades	Aunor		
2025	Towa and the Guardians of the Sacred Tree	Saikaku, Waboku, Girl 1		
2025	Hyrule Warriors: Age of Imprisonment	Ronza		
2025	Zenless Zone Zero	Orphie Magnusson & Magus		
2025	Digimon Story: Time Stranger	Additional voices		
2026	Code Vein II	Protagonist		
2026	Fire Emblem: Fortune's Weave	Anatolia		
2026	Castlevania: Belmont's Curse	Carmilla		

=== Web series ===
Year	Title	Role	Notes	Source
2019	Epithet Erased	Zora Salazar	Main role	
2021–present	Chikn Nuggit	Sody Pop		
2024–present	The Land of Boggs	Boggo	Main role; replacing Kate Peterman	
