= Dani Chambers =

American voice actress

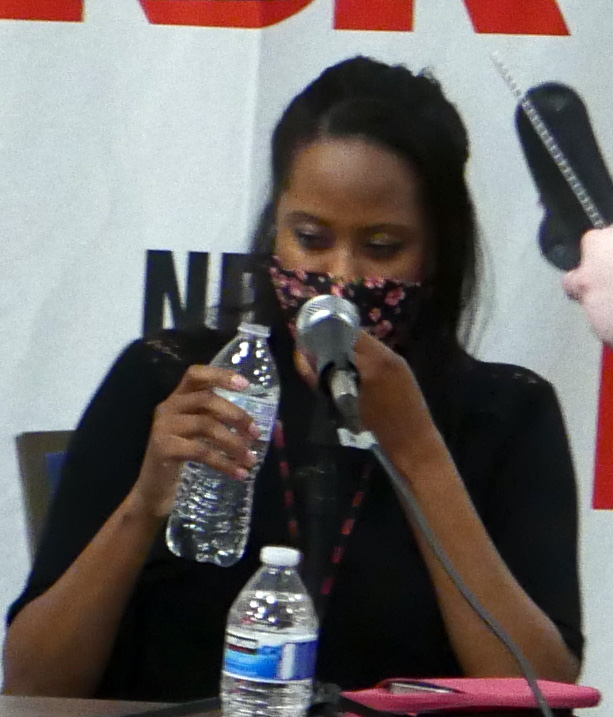
- Chambers at Nan Desu Kan 2021
- Born: July 23; San Bernardino, California, U.S.
- Occupation: Voice actress
- Years active: 2017–present
- Website: www.danidchambers.com

Dani Chambers (born July 23) is an American voice actress known for her work on anime dubs. She is best known for her roles as Chise Hatori in The Ancient Magus' Bride, Becky Blackbell from Spy × Family, Emilico in Shadows House, Hina Sato from The Day I Became a God, and Serval from Kemono Friends.

== Biography ==
Chambers was born and raised into San Bernardino, California. Growing up, Chambers was a fan of Sailor Moon and Tenchi Muyo!, as well as voice actress Cree Summer. She also got into theater and acting from a young age.

In 2013, Chambers started creating videos for YouTube, where she learned the basics of voice acting. In late 2016, she joined Funimation and was cast in her first role as Zanko Fujiwara in The Morose Mononokean.

== Filmography ==
=== Film ===
List of voice performances in film
Year	Title	Role	Notes	Source
2018	High Speed! Free! Starting Days	Mother Kirishima, Ikuya Kirishima (young)		
2020	My Hero Academia: Heroes Rising	Mahoro		
2021	Josee, the Tiger and the Fish	Mai Ninomiya		
2022	Dragon Ball Super: Super Hero	Preschool Teacher		
2022	The Seven Deadly Sins: Grudge of Edinburgh Part 1	Recela		
2024	Spy × Family Code: White	Becky Blackbell		

=== Anime series ===
List of voice performances in anime series
Year	Title	Role	Notes	Source
2017–23	The Ancient Magus' Bride	Chise Hatori	Lead role	
2017	Star Blazers: Space Battleship Yamato 2199	Miki Saijo		
2017	The Morose Mononokean	Zenko Fujiwara		
2018	Endro!	Fai		
2018	Cardcaptor Sakura: Clear Card	Naoko		
2018	Harukana Receive	Ayasa		
2018	Island	Sara		
2018	Lord of Vermilion: The Crimson King	Dux		
2018	Free! -Dive to the Future-	Ikuya Kirishima (young)		
2018	SSSS.Gridman	Tonkawa		
2018	RErideD – Derrida, who leaps through time –	Mayuka		
2018	Conception	Sagittarius		
2018	Fairy Tail	Mary		
2018	Ulysses: Jeanne d'Arc and the Alchemist Knight	Philip		
2019	The Quintessential Quintuplets	Raiha Uesugi		
2019	Ace Attorney	Dahlia Hawthorne, Iris		
2019	Kono Oto Tomare! Sounds of Life	Fumi Hanamura		
2019	Mix	Otomi		
2019, 2025	Dr. Stone	Maya Biggs, Shovel		
2019	Kemono Friends	Serval	Lead role	
2019	BEM	Bela	Lead role	
2019	Astra Lost in Space	Funicia		
2019	Arifureta: From Commonplace to World's Strongest	Suzu Taniguchi		
2019	After School Dice Club	Aya Takayashiki	Lead role	
2020	Asteroid in Love	Misa		
2020	If My Favorite Pop Idol Made It to the Budokan, I Would Die	Aya Yokota		
2020	Smile Down the Runway	Kokoro Hasegawa	Main role	
2020	Hatena Illusion	Kokomi Kikyōin		
2020	Infinite Dendrogram	Babylon		
2020	Deca-Dence	Fei		
2020	Our Last Crusade or the Rise of a New World	Risya In Empire		
2020	The Day I Became a God	Hina Sato	Lead role	
2020	Wandering Witch: The Journey of Elaina	Saya		
2021	Mushoku Tensei: Jobless Reincarnation	Lilia Greyrat		
2021	Log Horizon	Kalua	Season 3	
2021	Strike Witches: Road to Berlin	Altia		
2021–22	Shadows House	Emilico	Lead role	
2021	Black Rock Shooter	Yuu		
2021	Full Dive	Cathy		
2021	The Case Study of Vanitas	Lucius "Luca" Oriflamme		
2021, 2025	My Hero Academia	Mawata Fuwa		
2021	The World Ends with You the Animation	Rhyme		
2021	Banished from the Hero's Party, I Decided to Live a Quiet Life in the Countryside	Rit	Lead role	
2021	The Dungeon of Black Company	Demon Lord		
2022–25	My Dress-Up Darling	Nowa		
2022	Girls' Frontline	M4 SOPMOD II		
2022	Aharen-san Is Indecipherable	Aharen	Lead role	
2022	Tomodachi Game	Yutori		
2022–26	Spy × Family	Becky Blackbell		
2022	Smile of the Arsnotoria the Animation	Mell		
2022	The Slime Diaries: That Time I Got Reincarnated as a Slime	Touka		
2022	Lucifer and the Biscuit Hammer	Hanako Sorano, Yuuhi Amamiya (young)		
2023	My Clueless First Friend	Umi		
2023	Frieren: Beyond Journey's End	Linie		
2024–25	Solo Leveling	Lee Joo-hee		
2024	A Condition Called Love	Hotaru Hinase		
2024	Code Geass: Rozé of the Recapture	Catherine		
2024	Delico's Nursery	Angelico Fra		
2024	After-School Hanako-kun	Mokke C		
2025	The Ossan Newbie Adventurer	Reanette Elfelt		
2025	Zenshu	Destiny Heartwarming		
2025	Failure Frame	Seras Ashrain		
2025	Tying the Knot with an Amagami Sister	Uryu Kamihate (young)		
2025	With You and the Rain	Mimi		
2025	My Status as an Assassin Obviously Exceeds the Hero's	Lia		
2025	Let's Play	Vikki		
2025	Gachiakuta	Kyouka Nijiku		
2026	Fate/strange Fake	Tiné Chelc		

=== Video games ===
List of voice performances in video games
Year	Title	Role	Notes	Source
2021	Cris Tales	Adri		
2022	Cookie Run: Kingdom	Caramel Arrow Cookie		
2022	Genshin Impact	Nilou		
2022	Path to Nowhere	Oliver, Faye		
2023	Fire Emblem Engage	Timerra		
2023	Trinity Trigger	Firn		
2023	Honkai: Star Rail	Arlan		
2023	Arknights	Cement		
2023	Disgaea 7: Vows of the Virtueless	Additional voices		
2023	Silent Hope	Frederica		
2024	Unicorn Overlord	Mercenary (Type E)/NPC		
2025	Rune Factory: Guardians of Azuma	Additional voices		
2025	Story of Seasons: Grand Bazaar	Sylvia		
2025	Daemon X Machina: Titanic Scion	Iris		
2025	Solo Leveling: Arise	Lee Joo-hee		
2026	Zenless Zone Zero	Sigrid de L'Azur		

=== Web series ===
Year	Title	Role	Notes	Source
2019	Epithet Erased	Molly Blyndeff	Lead Role	
2022	Rainbow High	Simone Summers		
