= Epithet Erased =

American animated series

- Logo
- Genre: Action; Comedy
- Created by: Brendan Blaber
- Based on: Anime Campaign by Brendan Blaber
- Written by: Brendan Blaber
- Directed by: Brendan Blaber
- Voices of: Dani Chambers; Kyle Igneczi; Sandra Espinoza; Lindsay Sheppard; Anthony Sardinha; Zach Maher; William Sopp; Dawn Michelle Bennett; Brendan Blaber
- Theme music composer: Plasterbrain
- Opening theme: "Deadline" performed by Cassie Ewulu
- Ending theme: "Great at Crime" performed by OR30, Cassie Ewulu, Emily Fajardo, and Brendan Blaber (episodes 1–4); "Great at Cowboy" performed by Dawn M. Bennett (episodes 5–7)
- Composer: Plasterbrain
- Country of origin: United States
- Original language: English
- No. of seasons: 1
- No. of episodes: 7

Production
- Executive producers: Tom Laflin; Brad Graeber
- Producer: Rachel Citron
- Animators: Jeff Freeman; Tyler Richlen; Deanna Trudeau; John Varvir
- Editors: Francisco J. Berrones; Brendan Blaber; Emily Fajardo; Kaden Kroll; Paul Latza; Ryan E. Murphy; Mickey Nuspl; Ericsson Sambo; Rebaz Talei
- Production companies: Powerhouse Animation Studios; Scrubba Dubs; Sound Cadence Studios
- Budget: $250,000

Original release
- Network: VRV; YouTube
- Release: November 8, 2019

"Great at Crime" instrumental
The instrumental for “Great at Crime”, the closing theme for Epithet Erased

Epithet Erased is an American animated action-comedy web series created by Brendan Blaber. It premiered on VRV on November 8, 2019, and on Blaber's YouTube channel JelloApocalypse on November 22, 2019. The show uses limited 2D animation where the character's 2D sprites are operated like puppets, and many actions are accented with voice work, similar to how a Dungeons & Dragons player might describe an action their character is taking.

== Setting ==
The series takes place in Sweet Jazz City, where one out of five people are born with epithets: powers attached to their souls which stem from a word that reflects their power. People without epithets are known as Mundies.

== Plot ==
=== Museum Arc ===
A magical amulet known as the Arsene Amulet, which is rumored to be capable of stealing a person's epithet, is hidden in the Sweet Jazz Museum. While on a field trip with her class, led by Mera Salamin and her bodyguard, Indus Tarbella, and chaperoned by her father, Martin Blyndeff, Molly Blyndeff falls asleep and awakens in the now-closed Museum. The Banzai Blasters, a group of thieves led by their captain, Giovanni Potage, break into the Museum and confront Molly. Indus saves Molly from the thieves and helps Mera defeat them, but it is revealed that he and Mera are thieves who plan to steal the Arsene Amulet and imprison Molly and Giovanni. They manage to trick Indus into freeing them so that they can prevent Mera from finding the Amulet and encounter psychologist Sylvester “Sylvie” Ashling, who attacks them. However, they manage to convince her to join them to stop Mera. When they confront her, she reveals that she plans to steal the Amulet because her epithet, “Fragile”, causes her constant pain. Molly and Giovanni team up to defeat Mera and retrieve the Amulet, after which police officer Percival “Percy” King arrests Mera and Indus and Molly “dumbs” down Mera's pain with her epithet.

=== Redwood Arc ===
Giovanni makes a deal with a mysterious person, with them agreeing to meet at the Redwood Run hideout. At Redwood Run, the person is revealed to be Ramsey Murdoch; as Giovanni leaves, Bugsy Pugsler and Arnold Markdown, “vice presidents" of the Blasters, stop him and steal the Amulet. Meanwhile, Percy heads for Redwood Run to catch criminals, while Zora Salazar, who is hunting down Ramsey, threatens him to hide before she escapes. In the sheriff's office, Percy encounters Ramsey, who promises that she can catch several criminals for “the price of one”. Percy agrees and goes to a local bar, where she finds Giovanni, but is caught by Bugsy, Arnold, and the Blasters. After Giovanni and Percy defeat them, they flee without Arnold. Arnold then tells Percy and Ramsey that they planned to escape to a train station, where Percy and Ramsey are heading. While escaping, Bugsy and the Banzai Blasters encounter Zora, who turns Bugsy into a baby before fleeing. When Ramsey and Percy go to the train station, Zora attacks them and reveals that she plans to steal the Amulet because she hates epithets, considering it unfair that people without epithets train hard to succeed, only to be surpassed by those who do possess epithets. The story ends with Ramsey and Percy successfully defeating Zora.

== Characters ==
- Molly Blyndeff (voiced by Dani Chambers) – A 12-year-old girl who runs a toy emporium in place of her neglectful father, Martin, and her sister. During a school trip to the Sweet Jazz Museum, she becomes involved in the Banzai Blasters' attempt to steal the Amulet. Her Epithet, "Dumb", allows her to create a soundproof bubble to mute everything around her. She can also dumb down pain she or others feel, which can lower others' intelligence and make them highly suggestible, as well as summoned objects.
- Giovanni Potage (voiced by Kyle Igneczi) – A 19-year-old man and a leader of the Banzai Blasters. Though he considers himself to be evil, his ambitions often fail and his attempts to be cool and menacing come across as pathetic. As well, he has a soft side, as he cares for his minions and Molly, guiding her to become more independent and teaming up with her to defeat Indus and Mera. His Epithet, "Soup", allows him to make different kinds of soup. At the end of season 1, after being humiliated by his fellow Banzai Blasters, he leaves and becomes a solo villain.
- Percival "Percy" King (voiced by Sandra Espinoza) – A police detective and head of the investigation into the theft of the Arsene Amulet. As a police officer, she values order and safety, but can come off as insensitive and straightforward. She wields a sword and her Epithet, "Parapet", allows her to construct small medieval-style buildings, which can be used to attack and heal.
- Mera Salamin (voiced by Lindsay Sheppard) – The main antagonist of the Museum arc. Her Epithet, "Fragile", allows her to increase the fragility of objects until they shatter. However, this also causes her body to be in constant pain, with her seeking to steal the Amulet to negate the pain.
- Indus Tarbella (voiced by Anthony Sardinha) – Mera's loyal bodyguard and sidekick. He joined her after she challenged him to a duel and defeated him while passing through his hometown of Desert Country, with him following her as her bodyguard to learn to become strong like her. His Epithet, "Barrier", allows him to produce barriers that vary in size and can be moved around.
- Dr. Sylvester "Sylvie" Ashling (voiced by Zach Maher) – A 15-year-old psychologist who investigates interactions between epithets and the human psyche. During the trip to the Museum, he overhears Indus talking about the Amulet and decides to stay behind to find and study it. Though dedicated to research and his job, him isolating himself with his research as a child caused him to have few friends. As well, he tends to act snarky and push others away, as well as think that he is right and overthink things. Despite this, he is caring. His Epithet, "Drowsy", allows him to spread golden dust that causes those who breath it to fall asleep and bring their dreams to live. He can also summon a herd of sheep, bring people's fears to life, and put himself to sleep, bringing his dream self, Dr. Beefton, to life to fight for him.
- Ramsey Murdoch (voiced by William Sopp) – A manipulative and sly underworld appraiser and con artist who is on the run from Zora. He is laid-back and calm, but when in tough situations, becomes panicky and cowardly. His Epithet, "Goldbricker", allows him to transform objects into solid gold and back, including himself.
- Zora Salazar (voiced by Dawn M. Bennett) – The main antagonist of the Redwood arc. She is a bounty hunter who was originally sent to take down Ramsey for embezzlement and forgery before terrorist organization Bliss Ocean assigned her to retrieve the Arsene Amulet. She is malicious and selfish in the pursuit of her goals. She wields guns and her Epithet "Sundial" allows her to make process move forwards or backward, including gravity, inertia, the cycle of the sun, and even a person's lifespan.

== Production ==
Brendan Blaber began drafting the script for the series as early as Fall 2018, pitching it to VRV in October of that year. Official production is estimated to have begun sometime between March and May 2019, when the series was developed and produced up until the airing of episode 7 on VRV on December 20, 2019.

The concept of "epithets" were originally introduced in Brendan's Roll20 Tabletop RPG campaign Anime Campaign. As he liked the concept, he decided to carry over elements and characters to Epithet Erased with slight changes.

According to Blaber, Season 1 cost almost $250,000 to make, mostly raised from Patreon and by VRV.

A sequel novel, Epithet Erased: Prison of Plastic, written by Blaber and illustrated by Bo Hello, was released as a follow-up to the series on December 9, 2022. A follow-up novel, Epithet Erased: Sweet Escape, has been funded, with Blaber intending to continue the series.

== Release and reception ==
The first episode was released on VRV on 8 November 2019, exclusively in the United States. It was released internationally on YouTube on 22 November 2019, with episodes premiering two weeks after their VRV premiere.

The series has received positive reviews, with critics praising the concept, characters, and writing and criticism towards the limited animation and plot direction.

== Merchandise ==
A plush toy of the show's protagonist, Molly, was released on May 9, 2020 by the company Makeship. To produce the doll, Makeship needed 500 pre-orders, which they reached within two days.

Alongside the announcement of the doll, a soundtrack CD and Season 1 poster were also released through plasterbrain's Bandcamp and Brendan's Teespring. An advertisement featuring Molly and Giovanni discussing the products was released on the JelloApocalypse YouTube channel.
