= Kyra Kupetsky =

American animator (born 1993)

- Born: September 7, 1993 (age 33); New York, U.S.
- Occupations: Animator; cartoonist; voice actress
- Years active: 2017–present
- Known for: Chikn Nuggit; The Good Advice Cupcake

Kyra Kupetsky (born September 7, 1993) is an American animator, cartoonist, and voice actress. She is most known for creating and voicing the titular character in the TikTok and YouTube series Chikn Nuggit, which is produced by BuzzFeed.

== Life and career ==
Kupetsky was raised in New York and moved to Burbank, California, after attending the School of Visual Arts in 2015.

Kupetsky is a lesbian.

Before BuzzFeed, she worked on two shorts, Forget Me Not and Thrill of the Haunt. She is also credited as an animator for five episodes of Too Loud, though it is unclear if this was before or after she joined the site's creative team.

In 2017, she began working for the BuzzFeed Animation Lab, and worked on series such as The Good Advice Cupcake and Late Bloomicorn. In 2020, she created Chikn Nuggit, a series of shorts distributed on YouTube and TikTok. As of June 2023, the shorts have amassed a combined total of over 1 billion views.

In 2023, a Chikn Nuggit television series was announced, being co-produced by Frederator Studios, Genius Brands, and BuzzFeed Animation Lab, a subsidiary of BuzzFeed.

== Artistry ==
Kupetsky creates animation that is "cute and heartwarming", inspired by drawings she created in her childhood, and in her time between university and work.
