= The Land of Boggs =

- Genre: Comedy
- Created by: Lizz Hickey
- Showrunners: Lizz Hickey (2018–2019); Brent Sievers (2019-2025); Simeon Kondev (2024–2025); Emily Curran (2024–present)
- Voices of: Dawn M. Bennett; Kelsey Impicciche
- Country of origin: United States
- Original language: English

Production
- Animators: Emily Curran; Simeon Kondev; Kate Costello
- Production companies: BuzzFeed Animation Lab; Frederator Studios (series)

Original release
- Network: Instagram
- Release: 2018 – present

The Land of Boggs is an American animated web series created by Lizz Hickey. Produced by BuzzFeed Animation Lab, it was released on Instagram in 2018, but later also went onto TikTok, Facebook and YouTube. The series follows Boggo and Boe, two best friends who find themselves in various situations, usually to the point of absurdity.

== Synopsis ==
The Land of Boggs is about two best friends, Boggo and Boe, learning to embrace the wondrous chaos that comes with growing up, as they weave in and out of trouble.

== Voice cast and characters ==
=== Main ===
- Kate Peteman (2018–2023) and Dawn M. Bennett (2024–present) as Boggo, an introverted blue Bogg, prefers to spend time indoors, for example, reading or watching her favorite TV series.
  - Emily Curran briefly played Boggo in 2023.
- Kelsey Impicciche as
  - Boe, an extroverted transgender orange Bogg who is outgoing, friendly, and outspoken, and is also Boggo's best friend.
    - Selorm Kploanyi briefly played Boe in 2024.
  - Aiden, an orange Bogg and is Boe's younger brother.
  - Betsy, an orange Bogg and is Boe's mother.
    - Selorm Kploanyi briefly played Betsy in 2024.
  - Anna May, an anime Bogg and is Aiden's girlfriend.
- Brent Sievers as Mark, a blue Bogg who wants to be the third friend in the Boggo and Boe gang and who tries to look cool, but every time he tries, he gets ignored.
- Vivian Nweze as Tiffany, a purple Bogg who is a hopeless romantic and an astrology enthusiast.
- Simeon Kondev (until 2026) & Emily Curran as Taylor Grift, a cruel, apathetic pop singer and Boggo's Idol. She was inspired by Taylor Swift.
- Kate Costello as Blablabla, a green Bogg who is Boggo's friend and works as a barista.
- Carolina Reynoso as Boe's Grandma.

=== Guest ===
- Nate Charpentier as Iscream, a terrifying demon disguised as a cute rabbit who often kidnaps Boggo and Boe. In every one of their appearances, they parody the Saw film series, with themselves portrayed as Jigsaw. Iscream originates from Chikn Nuggit, another web series by BuzzFeed Animation Lab.

== History and production ==
Lizz Hickey created it as part of a character development initiative within the Animation Team. She based the original designs on "vintage clothes pins", which had a small round head and two pinching legs. From there, Lizz developed a sweet, fantastical series with a small team of women animators. She started posting the beginnings of "The Boggs" to several platforms, where it started gaining traction and popularity.

Around 2019-2020, Lizz Hickey voluntarily stepped back from the project to focus on her other successful project she created, called Weird Helga. Lizz allowed Brent Sievers to "showrun" The Land of Boggs, where he produced, wrote, and directed future episodes.

In February 2023, producer Frederator Studios signed a deal with BuzzFeed Animation Lab to produce a full-length series based on The Land of Boggs. Several other BuzzFeed properties are included in the deal, such as Chikn Nuggit.

In 2024, co-creator Lizz Hickey was laid off from BuzzFeed, leading to the show's animator Simeon Kondev becoming a showrunner of the series alongside Sievers.

== Related media ==
=== Video game ===
A mobile video game called The Land of Boggs: Decor Dash was released on Android and iOS on December 22, 2025.
