= DramaFever =

Defunct internet television site

- Company type: Subsidiary
- Founded: August 6, 2009; 17 years ago
- Dissolved: October 16, 2018; 7 years ago
- Successor: HBO Max
- Headquarters: New York City, {{{location_country}}}
- Key people: Seung Bak, founder & CEO; Suk Park, founder & President
- Industry: Video on demand
- Parent: Warner Bros. (2016–18)
- Website: www.dramafever.com
- Registration: Free & Subscription
- Current status: Shut down (since October 16, 2018)

DramaFever was a video streaming website owned by Warner Bros. that offered on-demand streaming video of documentaries, movies, and TV shows with subtitles. DramaFever's content offering was both ad-supported for regular users and available in high definition for premium subscribers.

DramaFever was available on a variety of devices including iPad, iPhone, Android, and Roku. The company's library of international programming was one of the largest licensed U.S. collections available online, in both English and Spanish, and comprised over 15,000 episodes from 70 content partners across 12 countries. More recently, the company branched out into co-producing television dramas, co-producing the 2013 Korean drama The Heirs and the 2014 drama Naeil's Cantabile. On February 23, 2016, it became a subsidiary of Warner Bros. DramaFever content was available on their own platform as well as via the VRV streaming service. Warner Bros. shut down the service and company on October 16, 2018. Its content was available via VRV until November 1, 2018.

== History ==
Built upon the feedback of drama fans, many of whom previously frequented pirated sites for Korean drama, the original site was in beta before going live on August 6, 2009. The founders raised approximately US$12 million from investors before the website was acquired by SoftBank in October 2014 for approximately US$100 million. Softbank sold the site to Warner Bros. in mid-2016.

DramaFever was shut down by Warner Bros. on October 16, 2018, with no advance notice to its subscribers, though, where applicable, refunds to subscribers were hinted at. All that remained on its website was the following message on its main page:

Thank you for nine great years

For nine years, DramaFever offered a place for streaming the best Korean, Chinese and Japanese dramas on-demand, straight to your device. We appreciate the passion of our fans and it's been a privilege to deliver you this content. While this decision [to shut down the service] is difficult, there are a variety of business reasons that have led to this conclusion. We appreciate each and every one of our fans and their passion for the content DramaFever was able to bring into your lives. We'd like to take this time to extend our thanks and gratitude to you, our loyal subscribers. We'll be issuing refunds as applicable, and subscribers will receive an email from us with details in the coming days.

Sincerely,

The DramaFever Team

== Audience ==
In 2013, DramaFever reported that over 80% of its estimated 3.5 million monthly viewers are non-Asian, and that the majority are young, urban and educated. As of May 2014, newly added Spanish and Latin American content was expected to increase viewership among Hispanic users. As of May 2015, the website had around 8 million monthly active users. Females made up 65% of viewers, most significantly in the 18 to 34 age range.

== Partnerships ==
In 2012, DramaFever sponsored The Supply Cup 2012, a charity soccer tournament hosted by YouTube personalities to benefit the non-profit organization The Supply, which helps build secondary schools in African slums to better provide greater possibilities for the next generation.

In 2011, Dramafever partnered with San Diego Asian Film Festival to present the first virtual on-demand Asian American film festival titled "DigiFest."

In March 2010, DramaFever unveiled a partnership with Hulu.

DramaFever also made curated selections from its collection available on Netflix and iTunes. After their first week in the iTunes store, two popular Korean romantic comedies, "Boys Over Flowers" and "Heartstrings", broke the iTunes Top 200.

== Licensing ==
DramaFever held licensing deals with all three of the major Korean TV networks: Seoul Broadcasting System, Korean Broadcasting System, and Munhwa Broadcasting Corporation. It was the first website to work with all three South Korean content providers legally, and its partners represented over 60 of the top TV networks and production companies from China, Taiwan, Japan, Philippines, Singapore, Argentina and Spain. Other licensing partners include Artear, CCTV, Imagina, RTVE, Sanlih E-Television, Shanghai Media Group and Telefe among others.

== Subscription offering ==
Consumers could choose between a free or premium subscription. Registered subscribers could watch limited videos for free with commercials while premium subscribers watched without interruptions and in high definition. Users could register on the site or with their Facebook login.

A premium subscription cost $4.99 a month or $49.99 a year in the United States. Content from Asia was available to the U.S., Canada and Latin America. Content from Latin America and Spain was only available to U.S. and Canada users due to international licensing agreements.

DramaFever reportedly had over 400,000 paying subscribers by the time it was shut down in October 2018.

== Recognition ==
On December 13, 2010, DramaFever was awarded the Korean Business of the Year Award by the Korean Creative Content Agency (KOCCA), Korean Cultural Center and Korean Ministry of Culture, Sports and Tourism for its work showcasing Korean content in the U.S.

== DramaFever Awards ==
In February 2013, DramaFever launched the first "Annual DramaFever Awards" honoring films, dramas, actors and actresses of the year through subscriber voting. The ceremony for the 3rd Annual DramaFever Awards was sponsored by Toyota and was held at the Hudson Theatre in New York City in February 2015. The 4th Annual DramaFever Awards in 2016 received a total of 1, 889, 384 votes from users and the 5th one received a total of 3,239,506 international votes.

The announcement of the winners in each category was accompanied by videos including fragments of the work of the nominees and a final segment showing the winner thanking for the award with a brief speech.

== See also ==
- List of Korean television shows
- Contemporary culture of South Korea
- Korean drama
- Korean Wave
- Max (streaming service)
  - Hooq
- Hulu
- List of streaming media services
