= Chikn Nuggit =

American animated web series

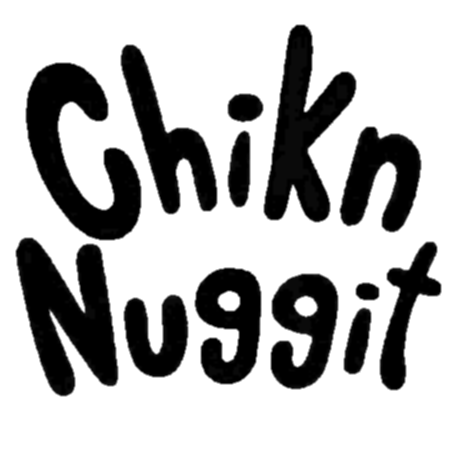
- Genre: Comedy; Fantasy
- Created by: Kyra Kupetsky
- Written by: Kyra Kupetsky; Kevie Santos; Matt Pierce (Note: Additional work done by Erin Chack, Allison Mehner, Simeon Kondev, Meredith Kesh, Brent Sievers and Brooke Burnett)
- Directed by: Kyra Kupetsky
- Voices of: Kyra Kupetsky; Vivian Nweze; Nate Charpentier; Carolina Reynoso; Cristina Vee; Dawn M. Bennett; Elisabeth Riley; Kellen Goff; Nick Butera; Joshua Waters
- Country of origin: United States
- Original language: English

Production
- Producer: Kyra Kupetsky
- Animators: Kyra Kupetsky; Kevie Santos; Matt Pierce (Note: Additional work done by Allison Mehner, Danny A. Reyes, Elizabeth Gotlieb, Emily Zullo, Meredith Kesh, and Brooke Burnett)
- Production companies: BuzzFeed Animation Lab; Frederator Studios (series)

Original release
- Network: TikTok; X (formerly Twitter); Instagram; YouTube; Bluesky
- Release: October 15, 2020 – present

Chikn Nuggit is an American animated web series on TikTok, X (formerly Twitter), Instagram and later YouTube and Bluesky created by Kyra Kupetsky for BuzzFeed. The series follows Chikn Nuggit and his group of fast food-named animal friends as they get into all sorts of mostly comedic antics. Since its initial release in October 2020, according to Genius Brands (now Kartoon Studios), Chikn Nuggit has included over three-hundred 15-20 second long shorts and over 9 million followers and a billion views on TikTok, X, YouTube and Instagram, entertaining fans worldwide with its "sweet and surreal adventures", and has even released a merchandise line.

== Synopsis ==
The series follows a long-eared yellow dog named Chikn Nuggit and his fast food-named animal friends as they embark on sweet, spooky, and often surreal comedic adventures together.

== Voice cast and characters ==
=== Main characters ===
- Kyra Kupetsky as Chikn Nuggit, a weird, but good-natured long-eared Golden Retriever-Basset Hound mix. Chikn is later revealed to be the Demigod of Chaos, destined to break the fabric of reality, but he defects from it.
- Vivian Nweze as Cheezborger "Chee", a cheerful, but sometimes shy calico cat who wears a cheeseburger hat and Chikn Nuggit's best friend. She is currently dating Cofi.
- Nate Charpentier as Iscream, a terrifying genderless demon disguised as a cute rabbit who loves causing chaos. "Iscream" is not their real name.
- Carolina Reynoso as Slushi, a kind-hearted, nerdy female Arctic fox.
- Cristina Vee as Fwench Fwy, a sweet, magical genderless wish dragon and Iscream's partner. "Fwench Fwy" is not their real name.
- Dawn M. Bennett as Sody Pop, a hyperactive red panda with explosive abilities.
- Elisabeth Riley as Cofi, a figurative and literal, mysterious sheep in wolf's clothing and Chee's girlfriend.
- Kellen Goff as Bezel, a humanoid personification of the Doomsday Clock who has come to reveal to Chikn his true nature. He formerly calls himself the "embodiment of time". Despite being a main character, he was not part of the group until 2024. He is the only main character whose name isn't a punny food-based type and to not be an anthropomorphic animal.

=== Recurring characters ===
- Nick Butera as Hawt Saus, a formerly trivial red squirrel.
- Kevie Santos as Sassparilla, Sody Pop's mother who doesn't seem to care whenever her son causes trouble and explodes.
- Kyra Kupetsky as Milkshek, Slushi's friend who can't seem to stop dating bad partners until she eventually started dating Old Pea.
- Matt Pierce as Old Pea, an old, green newt-like creature who is wealthy from his social media and is currently dating Milkshek. During his first appearance on April Fools Day 2023, he was initially made as a joke character. According to Kupetsky, Old Pea might not be as old as he looks.
- Joshua Waters as Onyn Ring, a nerdy eastern red bat and theorist who comes to Chikn's world with plans to restart Armageddon.

== History and production ==
On October 15, 2020, Kyra Kupetsky, the lead animator of BuzzFeed's Animation Lab, premiered the series on TikTok, Twitter and Instagram as a part of a few animated web series owned by BuzzFeed, such as The Land of Boggs. In 2022, the show debuted on YouTube, as part of the YouTube Shorts platform, long-form videos are occasionally exclusively posted there.

On February 4, 2023, Genius Brands International through its Frederator Networks subsidiary proposed a deal to BuzzFeed's Animation Labs that they would develop and produce a series based on the original works from BuzzFeed’s Animation Labs into an extended series, which included Chikn Nuggit in consideration because of its rapid growth in popularity, gathering over 7 million followers.

Michael Hirsh, CEO of Wow Unlimited Media, the parent company of Frederator Network, stated on the project: "We are pleased to further expand our roster of original animated series with BuzzFeed, giving the global fans of wildly popular IP, such as Chikn Nuggit, more of what they love."

Zee Myers, Head of BuzzFeed Animation Lab, also commented: "Millions of fans have let us know that they need the Chikn Nuggit animated series! We can’t wait to continue expanding our content universe for our global community in partnership with Frederator, a pioneer in animation and television."

On June 23, 2023, Genius Brands confirmed and started development on Chikn Nuggit into making it into a "premium content series." It became the second IP in development since the deal, after The Land of Boggs. A release date is yet to be announced.

On March 5, 2026, Kupetsky announced via Twitter that she could be leaving the show and stop voicing the titular character due to BuzzFeed feeding her characters to artificial intelligence, but the tweet was removed than a day after. On March 11, 2026, the conflict between Kupetsky and BuzzFeed was resolved. BuzzFeed agreed not to use Chikn Nuggit characters in AI projects and Kupetsky resumed working on Chikn Nuggit.
