= VRV (streaming service) =

Defunct video streaming service

- Website type: Video streaming service
- Founded: November 14, 2016; 9 years ago; San Francisco, California
- Dissolved: April 29, 2023; 3 years ago
- Headquarters: San Francisco, California (main); New York City, New York (secondary)
- Area served: United States
- Owners: AT&T (2016–2021); Sony (2021–2023)
- Key people: Arlen Marmel (VRV GM); Tom Pickett (Crunchyroll CEO)
- Industry: Video on demand
- Parent: WarnerMedia (2018–2021); Crunchyroll, LLC (2021–2023)
- Website: Archived official website at the Wayback Machine (archived 2023-04-04)
- Registration: Optional
- Launched: November 14, 2016; 9 years ago
- Current status: Defunct (shut down and absorbed into Crunchyroll)

VRV (officially pronounced "verve", though it is also referred to by its letters) was an American over-the-top streaming service launched in November 2016 by AT&T and the Chernin Group. The service bundled together anime, speculative fiction, educational, and gaming-related channels aimed at fans of such content.

Some of VRV's content could be streamed for free, while other content required a subscription. The subscriptions to its channels were available for purchase individually, or in a premium bundle. VRV was available only in the United States, despite some of its partnered content being available for viewing worldwide outside the platform.

In April 2023, it was announced VRV would merge with Crunchyroll, which was completed later that month.

== History ==
Ellation, owners of Crunchyroll, formally announced the launch of VRV on June 14, 2016. Its initial partners included Rooster Teeth, Seeso, Nerdist, Geek & Sundry, and Frederator's Cartoon Hangover. On September 29, Funimation, Adam Savage's Tested, RiffTrax, CollegeHumor, Machinima, Ginx TV, Shudder, and Mondo Media were announced as new partners. VRV would officially launch on November 14.

On August 9, 2017, the VRV Select channel was launched, featuring content from other sources. It was also announced that Machinima, Ginx, and Rifftrax were being dropped from the service. On the same day as VRV Select's announcement, Seeso announced via its Facebook page that it would be shutting down by the end of 2017. Though RiffTrax, Machinima and Seeso's channels were dropped, some of their content, including Seeso's The Cyanide & Happiness Show, HarmonQuest, Hidden America with Jonah Ray, and My Brother, My Brother and Me would migrate to VRV Select.

On November 21, CuriosityStream and Mubi joined VRV.

On December 12, DramaFever joined VRV.

On May 3, 2018, it was announced that Tested was being dropped, with its content moving to VRV Select.

On August 28, VRV launched NickSplat, named after the TeenNick programming block, featuring classic Nickelodeon series from the 1990s and early 2000s.

On October 12, Shout! Factory's content, such as ReBoot and Super Sentai Zyuranger, were made available to watch on VRV.

On October 18, Funimation announced that they would be leaving VRV, as their partnership with Crunchyroll ended, and all of their titles would disappear on November 9. On that same day, VRV announced that Hidive would be joining the service to replace Funimation.

On November 1, Hidive was launched on VRV and it was announced that Boomerang would be joining the service on November 13.

On November 7, season 1 of TBS's Final Space was made available to watch on VRV Select. On the same day, Otter Media announced Mike Tyson Mysteries and Jabberjaw were also going to be added to VRV in 2018.

On August 9, 2021, Crunchyroll was acquired by Sony-owned Funimation, making Sony the new owner of VRV.

On September 8, Hidive announced that it would be leaving VRV on September 30, in response to Sony's acquisition of Crunchyroll. Rooster Teeth left VRV a few months later on December 13, while Cartoon Hangover was also removed at the same time.

On March 1, 2022, it was announced that VRV would be merged into Crunchyroll itself, alongside Funimation and Wakanim. VRV ceased operations a year later on April 29, 2023.

== Channels ==
- Boomerang–Cartoons from Warner Bros. (left December 1, 2020)
- Cartoon Hangover—Web-original cartoons from Frederator Studios (left December 13, 2021)
- Crunchyroll—Anime and simulcasts (left April 29, 2023)
- CuriosityStream—Non-fiction documentaries relating to science, technology, nature, and world history (left November 19, 2019)
- DramaFever—Korean dramas (shut down on October 16, 2018, subsequently left VRV days after)
- Funimation—Japanese anime dubbed into English (left November 9, 2018)
- Geek & Sundry—Geek culture and lifestyle programming (left April 1, 2019)
- Ginx TV—Esports-related content
- Hidive—Dubbed and subtitled anime (left September 30, 2021)
- Machinima—gaming-related content (some content was still available via VRV Select)
- Mondo Media—Adult animation (left May 8, 2023)
- Mubi—Curates classic and arthouse films (left October 2018)
- Nerdist—Fandom-related news, podcasts, and comedy programming (left April 1, 2019)
- NickRewind—Television series from Nickelodeon that aired in the 1990s and early 2000s (left August 29, 2020)
- RiffTrax—MST3K-style movie commentaries (some content was still available via VRV Select)
- Rooster Teeth—Web animation and gaming-related content (left December 13, 2021)
- Seeso—original and licensed comedy programming (shut down on November 8, 2017, some original programming were migrated to VRV Select)
- Shudder—Horror films (left August 1, 2019)
- Tested (left May 3, 2018, some content was still available via VRV Select)
- VRV Select—A curated selection of movies and shows for premium subscribers (left April 29, 2023)

== Original programming ==
=== Series ===
Title	Genre	Premiere	Seasons/episodes	Status
Shadowstone Park (Note: Was available through Cartoon Hangover Select.)	Animation/Mystery	December 15, 2017	1 season, 3 episodes	Ended
Slug Riot	Animation/Comedy drama	January 5, 2018	1 season, 5 episodes	Ended
(not) Hero	Animated comedy/Adventure	February 9, 2018	1 season, 3 episodes	Ended
Paradigms: How We Know What We Know	Science documentary	March 2, 2018	1 season, 1 episodes	Ended
Chris P. Duck	Animated comedy/Slice of life	March 2, 2018	1 season, 6 episodes	Ended
Gary and His Demons (Note: Was available through Mondo's VRV channel.)	Adult animation/Comedy	April 15, 2018	1 season, 16 episodes	Moved to Prime Video (internationally) and Freevee (United States)
Daddy and the Big Boy	Adult animation/Comedy	October 16, 2018	1 season, 13 episodes	Ended
Allen's Pole	Adult animation/adventure	October 16, 2018	1 season, 4 episodes	Ended
Brogan: Master of Castles	Adult animation/Comedy	March 26, 2019	1 season, 6 episodes	Ended
Live From WZRD	Talk show	March 31, 2019	1 season, 8 episodes	Ended
Bigfoot	Adult animation/Comedy	September 29, 2019	1 season, 8 episodes	Ended
Epithet Erased (Note: Episodes were uploaded to YouTube two weeks after they premiered on VRV.)	Animated comedy/adventure	November 8, 2019	1 season, 7 episodes	Ended

=== Continuations ===
Title	Genre	Previous network	Premiere	Seasons/episodes	Status
HarmonQuest (seasons 2–3)	Adult animation/Live improvisation	Seeso	September 15, 2017	2 seasons, 20 episodes	Ended
Deep Space 69 (season 4)	Adult animation/Comedy	YouTube	December 22, 2017	1 season, 8 episodes	Ended
Bravest Warriors (seasons 3–4)	Animated comedy/Science fiction	YouTube	December 25, 2017	2 seasons, 58 episodes	Ended
Turbo Fantasy (season 2)	Adult animation/Comedy	YouTube	August 27, 2018	1 season, 3 episodes	Ended
The Cyanide & Happiness Show (season 4)	Adult animation/Comedy	Seeso	September 18, 2019	1 season, 10 episodes	Ended

== See also ==
- Anime on Demand
- Crunchyroll
- Wakanim
- List of streaming media services
