= TS4 =

TS4 may refer to:

- The Sims 4, a 2014 simulation video game
- Toy Story 4, a 2019 American film
