= Matt Melvin =

American webcartoonist (born 1984)

- Born: Matthew Melvin Schultzman; November 26, 1984 (age 41); San Diego, California, U.S.
- Occupations: Cartoonist, writer
- Notable work: Cyanide & Happiness

Matthew Melvin Schultzman (born November 26, 1984) is an American cartoonist and writer. He is known for his work on Cyanide & Happiness and his fantasy novel The Leeches Loom.

== Early life ==
Talking about his childhood, Melvin described himself as "a shy little kid [who] developed interest in various hobbies." Melvin started telling jokes and use humor in order to get over his shyness. At the age of 14, Melvin got a job at a community college computer lab, despite never having owned a computer himself and being two years below the legal working age. This was his first significant access to the Internet, and an instructor taught him how to create a webpage on GeoCities, which he populated primarily with South Park animated GIFs.

Melvin never read many comics during his childhood, except for The Far Side by Gary Larson and Life in Hell by Matt Groening. Instead, he was a big fan of sketch comedy, and pointed at The Kids in the Hall, Monty Python, Upright Citizens Brigade, and Mr. Show with Bob and David as his comedic inspirations. Melvin has also been influenced by the stand-up comedy of Lewis Black, Mitch Hedberg, David Cross, Patton Oswalt, Demetri Martin, and Sarah Silverman.

== Career ==
In collaboration with Rob DenBleyker, Matt Melvin started creating "bad stick figure death movies" in 1999 or 2000, under the title StickSuicide. The two posted these videos on Newgrounds. In 2004, Melvin started to collaborate with Fort Bridger-based Kris Wilson, Dallas-based Rob DenBleyker, and Belfast-based Dave McElfatrick to form Explosm, a group of international webcartoonists who create the Cyanide & Happiness webcomic. Generally, each page of Cyanide and Happiness is conceptualized and fully realized by one of the members, the four webcartoonists working primarily solo.

In 2014, Explosm announced that Melvin had parted ways with the rest of the group. There was disagreement within the group about the direction that Cyanide & Happiness was taking. McElfatrick stated that the members of the group "were all pulling in different directions," such as with a new website design and other new elements. "It's not been good for anyone, really. But we can just try and move on and do what we do," McElfatrick said of the split, and he noted that the Explosm team is still very supportive of Melvin's works. Melvin's last strip for Cyanide & Happiness was published on February 9, 2014.

The same year, Melvin started writing the webcomic The Last Nerds on Earth in collaboration with his girlfriend Austen, about two nerds who are trying to survive a zombie apocalypse. This webcomic was put on indefinite hiatus in 2016.

In 2020, he started work on The Leeches Loom, a free-to-read fantasy novel.

== Style ==
Melvin has described himself as "an adult with a mind of a child," being someone who finds flatulence humor highly comedic. Because of his "terrible memory", Melvin is rarely able to remember jokes, instead tending to crack jokes spontaneously during conversations. Melvin tends to write two dozen pages at once, filling the gaps in later. In an interview with Comic Book Resources, Melvin noted that a large number of his Cyanide & Happiness jokes are sexual in nature, be it about necrophilia, pedophilia, or sexually transmitted diseases. Kris Wilson comedically described Melvin as "the 'buttsex' go to guy."
