= Hidden America with Jonah Ray =

- Genre: Travel; Parody
- Presented by: Jonah Ray
- Country of origin: United States
- Original language: English
- No. of seasons: 2
- No. of episodes: 17

Production
- Running time: 30 minutes

Original release
- Network: Seeso
- Release: June 2, 2016 – May 4, 2017

Hidden America with Jonah Ray is a travel parody series that debuted on June 2, 2016 on Seeso. Parodying the style of Anthony Bourdain's travel show, viewers follow Jonah Ray as he explores and pokes fun at local restaurants, memorials and historical sites in various cities. Ray visits American cities including Boston, Austin, New Orleans and Chicago. The nine-episode first season features guests like Weird Al Yankovic, Ralph Garman, Jeff B. Davis, William Tokarsky, Randall Park, David Koechner, Conphidance and many more. On August 18, 2016 it was announced that Hidden America had been renewed for a second season.
