= Seeso =

Former subscription streaming service

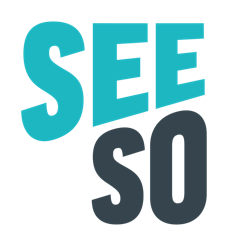
- Website type: Subsidiary
- Founded: January 7, 2016; 10 years ago
- Dissolved: November 8, 2017; 9 years ago
- Headquarters: United States
- Owner: NBCUniversal
- Services: Streaming media; Subscription service
- Current status: Shut down, superseded by Peacock

Seeso was an over-the-top subscription streaming service owned by Comcast through NBCUniversal, launched on January 7, 2016, and closed on November 8, 2017. It provided comedy content such as original and broadcast television shows.

== History ==
On December 2, 2014, Evan Shapiro joined NBCUniversal as the Executive Vice President of the newly formed NBCUniversal Digital Enterprises division of NBCUniversal Cable Entertainment Group after his job at Pivot to work on a digital project for the division.

On October 15, 2015, Seeso was officially announced with certain titles in its library. On December 3, Seeso was launched in an open beta that lasted from December 3, 2015 to January 6, 2016. Seeso was officially launched the day after.

On September 30, 2016, Seeso announced its first event called the "Stand-Up Streaming Fest", in which a title of comedy content would become available within a week, bringing a total of 12 specials for 12 weeks.

On May 3, 2017, Evan Shapiro announced his departure from the company. He was replaced by Maggie Suniewick, president of NBCU digital enterprises.

On August 9, 2017, Seeso announced via its Facebook page that the service would be shutting down by the end of 2017. On November 8, Seeso shut down its streaming service.

== Content ==
Seeso offered comedy shows, including Saturday Night Live, The Tonight Show Starring Jimmy Fallon, The Office (UK), Parks and Recreation, The Kids in the Hall, Fancy Boy, and Monty Python.

=== Original series ===
Title	Genre	Premiere	Seasons	Length	Status
The UCB Show	Sketch comedy	December 3, 2015	2 seasons, 16 episodes	30 min.	Ended; Moved to Starz
Bajillion Dollar Propertie$	Parody	February 20, 2016	3 seasons, 26 episodes	30 min.	Ended; Moved to Pluto TV
Big Jay Oakerson's What's Your F@%king Deal?!	Stand-up	March 17, 2016	2 seasons, 17 episodes	31-38 min.	Ended
Hidden America with Jonah Ray	Parody/Travel	June 2, 2016	1 season, 9 episodes	30 min.	Ended; Moved to VRV
Gentlemen Lobsters	Comedy/Adult animation	June 16, 2016	1 season, 8 episodes	14 min.	Ended
Night Train with Wyatt Cenac	Stand-up	June 30, 2016	1 season, 6 episodes	65-97 min.	Ended; Moved to Starz
HarmonQuest	Live improvisation/Adult animation	July 14, 2016	1 season, 10 episodes	25 min.	Moved to VRV
Take My Wife	Sitcom	August 11, 2016	1 season, 6 episodes	30 min.	Ended; Moved to Starz
Debate Wars	Comedy	September 22, 2016	1 seasons, 6 episodes	30 min.	Ended
The Cyanide & Happiness Show	Black comedy/Adult animation	December 9, 2016	2 seasons, 20 episodes	22 min.	Moved to VRV
My Brother, My Brother and Me	Advice/Comedy	February 23, 2017	1 season, 6 episodes	22-26 min.	Ended; Moved to VRV
Shrink	Sitcom	March 16, 2017	1 season, 8 episodes	30 min.	Ended; Moved to Hulu
Flulanthropy	Sitcom	July 13, 2017	1 season, 1 episode	28 min.	Ended

=== Co-productions ===
These shows have been commissioned by Seeso in cooperation with a partner from another country.

Title	Partner/Country	Genre	Premiere	Seasons	Length	Status	Language	Seeso Exclusive Regions
Flowers	Channel 4/United Kingdom	Black comedy	May 5, 2016	1 season, 6 episodes	30 min.	Ended	English	United States
Funny as Hell (season 6)	The Movie Network/Canada	Stand-up	December 15, 2016	1 season, 6 episodes	30 min.	Ended	English	United States

=== Specials ===
Title	Genre	Premiere
Cameron Esposito: Marriage Material	Stand-up	March 24, 2016
Doug Stanhope: No Place Like Home	Stand-up	September 15, 2016
Brian Posehn: Criminally Posehn	Stand-up	September 23, 2016
Jena Friedman: American Cunt	Stand-up	October 20, 2016
Janeane Garofalo: If I May	Stand-up	October 27, 2016
Schtick or Treat: Hollywood Stand Up Special	Stand-up	October 27, 2016
Mo Mandel: Negative Reinforcement	Stand-up	November 3, 2016
ADD Presents: Tyree Elaine	Stand-up	November 10, 2016
ADD Presents: Robert Powell	Stand-up	November 10, 2016
Dan Levy: Lion	Stand-up	November 17, 2016
Aries Spears: Comedy Blueprint	Stand-up	November 24, 2016
McSweeney's Internet Tendency Live!	Stand-up	November 24, 2016
Joe Matarese: Medicated	Stand-up	December 1, 2016
Lachlan Patterson: Live at Venice Beach	Stand-up	December 1, 2016
Andy Richter's Home for the Holidays	Holiday special	December 20, 2016
Nick Thune: Good Guy	Stand-up	December 22, 2016
Ian Harvie: May the Best Cock Win	Stand-up	December 29, 2016
Laurie Kilmartin: 45 Jokes About My Dead Dad	Stand-up	December 29, 2016
Brian Posehn: 25x2	Stand-up	January 2, 2017
Adam Newman: Fuzzies	Stand-up	January 26, 2017
Sasheer Zamata: Pizza Face	Stand-up	March 30, 2017
Doug Stanhope: The Comedians' Comedian's Comedians	Stand-up	June 22, 2017

Approximately coinciding with the August announcement of Seeso's impending shutdown, four of its originals – The Cyanide & Happiness Show, HarmonQuest, Hidden America with Jonah Ray, and My Brother, My Brother and Me were removed and transferred to the VRV streaming service. There's... Johnny!, a sitcom which had been produced for Seeso but not yet aired, was transferred to Hulu.

== See also ==
- List of streaming media services
