= Guest comic =

A guest comic (or guest strip) is an issue of a comic strip that is created by a different person (or people) than usual. The practice is especially common in webcomics.

== Guest comics in webcomics ==
Guest comics are usually requested of other artists by the usual creator of a webcomic. This may be done for a variety of reasons:

- The creators are friends.
- The usual creator will be unable to update the comic for some length of time, so they use guest comics to fill in the gap.
- The usual creator enjoys (or thinks the audience will enjoy) seeing how other artists draw their characters.
- A major phase of the plot has ended and the creator wants to take a break but keep the audience entertained.

Guest comics are usually not meant to be canonical with the normal comic; their purpose is primarily entertainment.

Sometimes, guest comics are not published as if they were regular comics, but instead exhibited on the comic's website in a separate section; e.g. White Ninja Comics. Webcomic creators that are in the same webcomic syndicate (e.g. Dayfree Press) frequently do guest comics for each other, sometimes simultaneously.
