= Jessica McKenna =

American actress, comedian and singer

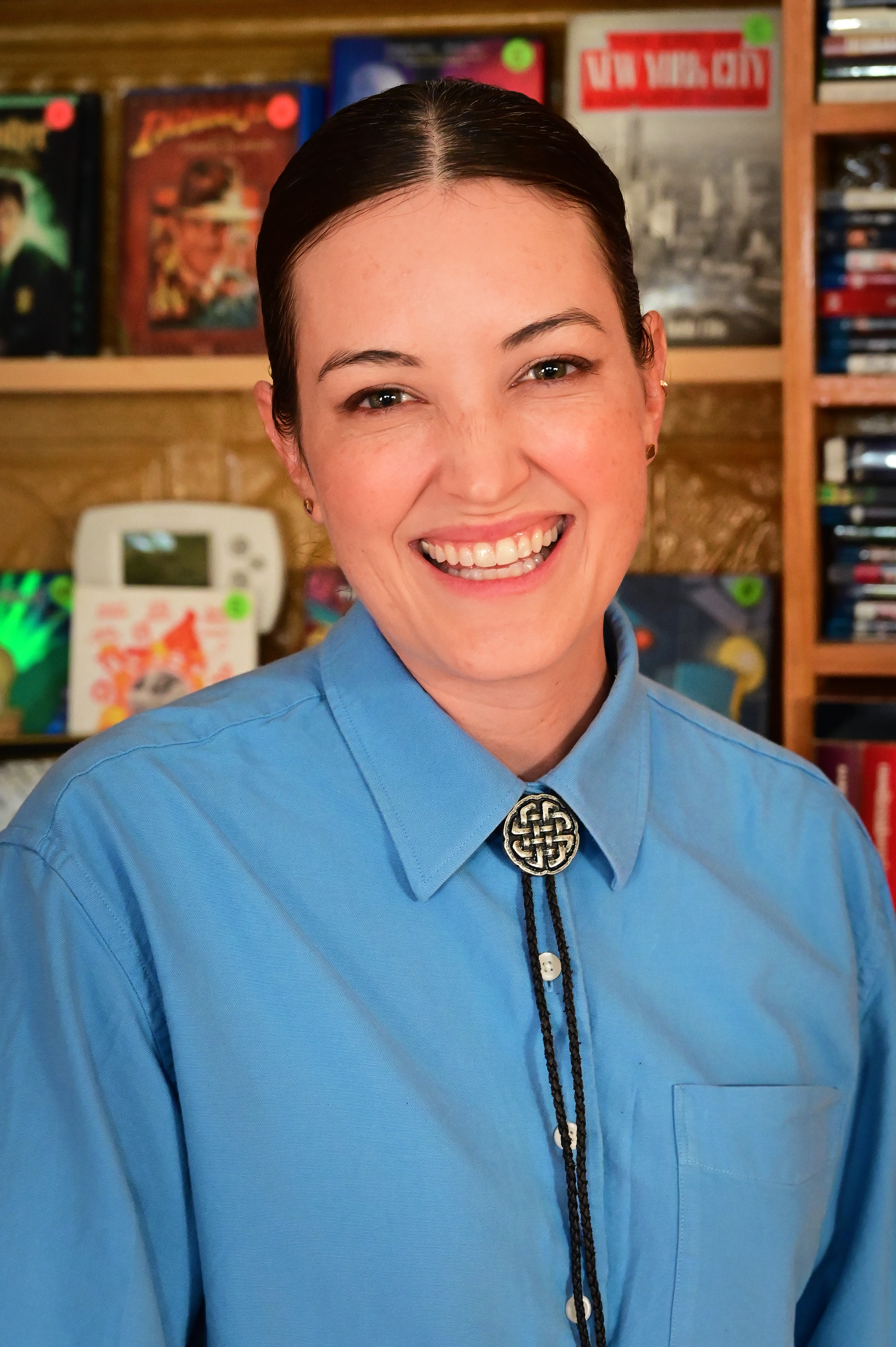
- McKenna in 2026
- Born: Yorba Linda, California, U.S.
- Education: Northwestern University
- Occupations: Actress; comedian; singer
- Years active: 2012–present

Jessica McKenna (sometimes credited as Jess McKenna) is an American actress, comedian and singer. McKenna trained with The Groundlings and at the Upright Citizens Brigade Theatre, where she regularly performs. McKenna was one of the stars of Fox's Party Over Here, alongside Nicole Byer and Alison Rich, and hosts the podcast Off Book: The Improvised Musical.

== Early life ==
McKenna was born in Yorba Linda, California. She received a bachelor's degree in theater from Northwestern University.

== Career ==
=== Theater ===
McKenna began training at the Upright Citizens Brigade Theatre after college, and became a regular performer in 2012. She regularly performs with the musical improv house teams, Magic to Do and Baby Wants Candy. McKenna is also a frequent performer at the Upright Citizens Brigade Theatre's long-running improv show, ASSSSCAT. McKenna has performed improv comedy at festivals including South by Southwest, SF Sketchfest, Edinburgh Fringe, the Del Close Marathon, Bumbershoot, and Chicago Sketch Fest.

=== Television, film, and web series ===
In 2014, McKenna was a regular cast member on Fox's improv-based game show, Riot, until its cancellation. In 2016, McKenna starred alongside fellow Upright Citizens Brigade (UCB) alumnae Nicole Byer and Alison Rich in Fox's sketch comedy show, Party Over Here, which was produced by The Lonely Island and Paul Scheer. Party Over Here was cancelled after one season. McKenna has appeared in episodes of Modern Family and The Goldbergs.

McKenna often collaborates with UCB alumnus Zach Reino. McKenna and Reino have worked together on musical sketches for Funny or Die, BuzzFeed, and Nickelodeon. In 2016, McKenna and Reino wrote and starred together in ABC's web series, Serious Music. Along with Zeke Nicholson, the pair also featured in a 2021 episode of Dropout series Game Changer titled "The Official Cast Recording", in which they improvised a short musical based on host Sam Reich's prompts. This was later adapted into a full series on Dropout titled Play It By Ear the following year. In 2026, McKenna and Reino wrote and composed Dropout's MP3.

McKenna also works as a voice actress. McKenna voices the lead character, Lennon, on Amazon's Little Big Awesome. It was originally announced that McKenna would voice the lead character on Billy Dilley's Super-Duper Subterranean Summer; however, creator Aaron Springer ultimately was cast in that role.

In 2022, McKenna, along with Neil Casey, Zach Reino, and Niccole Thurman, won the Writers Guild of America Award in the category "Quiz and Audience Participation" for her work on the series Baking It. In 2023, she was nominated again for the same award together with the other writers of Baking It.

In 2026, McKenna and Reino wrote, executive produced, directed, and featured in their original movie Mock Trial with Thundercane Productions.

=== Podcasts ===
Since 2017, McKenna and Reino have hosted the musical comedy podcast Off Book: The Improvised Musical, which was initially on the Earwolf network. In 2023, she appeared as one of the main characters in the children's podcast Sound Detectives. McKenna is also a regular guest on the podcast version of Comedy Bang! Bang!, where she is known for characters such as Beth, the Power Wheels–obsessed eight-year-old, This Is Your Boy Troy, and Park Ranger Margery Kershaw. McKenna has also appeared on Improv4Humans, Doughboys, The JV Club, and Hollywood Handbook.

== Filmography ==
=== Film ===
Year	Title	Role	Notes
2015	Beta	Lauren	Short film
2017	Gleep-Glorp & Lasertag	Gleep-Glorp	Voice; Short film
2017	Lane Woods Finds Love		
2018	Song of Back and Neck	Dawn	
2023	Craig Before the Creek	Handlebarb	Voice
2026	Gail Daughtry and the Celebrity Sex Pass	Actress playing Flight Attendant	
2026	Mock Trial	Kate	

=== Television ===
Year	Title	Role	Notes
2013–2016	Comedy Bang! Bang!	Various	3 episodes
2014	The Goldbergs	Waiter	Episode: "The Age of Darkness"
2015	The Hotwives	Mackenzie	2 episodes
2015	Adam Ruins Everything	Jess	Episode: "Adam Ruins Restaurants"
2015	Filthy Preppy Teen$	Macauley	Episode: "The Return of the Prodigal Teens"
2016	Party Over Here	Various	10 episodes
2016	American Dad!	Various voices	Episode: "Gifted Me Liberty"
2016	Legendary Dudas	Employee	Episode: "King Sam/Karate Kids"
2016–2017	The UCB Show	Various	2 episodes
2017	Voltron: Legendary Defender	Various voices	2 episodes
2018	Little Big Awesome	Lennon / various voices	13 episodes
2018	Modern Family	Nurse Tami	Episode: "The Escape"
2018–2025	Big City Greens	Various voices	4 episodes
2018–2023	Craig of the Creek	Handlebarb / Jake (voice)	14 episodes
2019	HarmonQuest	Flairence Sparrow	Episode: "Ad Quod Damnum"
2019	Sunnyside	Andromeda Burrff	Episode: "Pants Full of Sandwiches"
2019–2021	DC Super Hero Girls	Aqualad (voice)	18 episodes
2020	Space Force	Participant #2	Episode: "Proportionate Response"
2020	Trick Moon	Trickshot (voice)	TV pilot
2020–2024	Star Trek: Lower Decks	Ensign Barnes, various voices	19 episodes
2020–2022	The Mighty Ones	Rocksy (voice)	40 episodes
2021	Amphibia	Gabby (voice)	Episode: "Hop 'Til You Drop/Turning Point"
2021	Curb Your Enthusiasm	Waiter	Episode: "Irma Kostroski"
2021, 2025–2026	Game Changer	Herself	Episodes: "The Official Cast Recording", "Samalamadingdong", "Earwigs", "Last Talent Standing"
2021–2023	Ten Year Old Tom	Mrs. Band / various voices	14 episodes
2022	We Baby Bears	Baby Panda (singing voice)	Episode: "High Baby Fashion"
2022	Duncanville	Various voices	Recurring role
2022–2026	The Loud House	Boy Jordan, various voices	3 episodes
2022–2026	Make Some Noise	Herself	5 episodes
2022–2023	Play It by Ear	Various	16 episodes
2023	Strange Planet	Blanket Cape / Being #4 (voice)	Episode: "Greyscale Finger Bandit"
2023	Frasier	Kiki	Episode: "Blind Date"
2025	Goldie	Goldie (voice)	Main role
2025	Universal Basic Guys	Envy (voice)	Episode: "Down the Shore"
2026	Strip Law	(voice)	Episode: "Crypt Law Presents: Fearacle on 31st Day"
2026	MP3	Otterdrop / various	

=== Video games ===
Year	Title	Role
2020	Fallout 76: Steel Dawn	Maximo Leone
