= White Ninja =

White Ninja may refer to:

== People ==
- Kazuo Sakurada (1948–2020), Japanese professional wrestler who used the ring name "White Ninja"
- Keiji Muto (born 1962), Japanese professional wrestler who used the ring name "White Ninja"

== Arts and entertainment ==
- White Ninja (webcomic), by Scott Bevan and Kent Earl
- White Ninja, a 1990 novel by Eric Van Lustbader
- Zane (Ninjago), also known as the "White Ninja", a fictional character in the animated television series Ninjago

== See also ==
- Black Ninja (disambiguation)
