= Jeff Galfer =

American actor

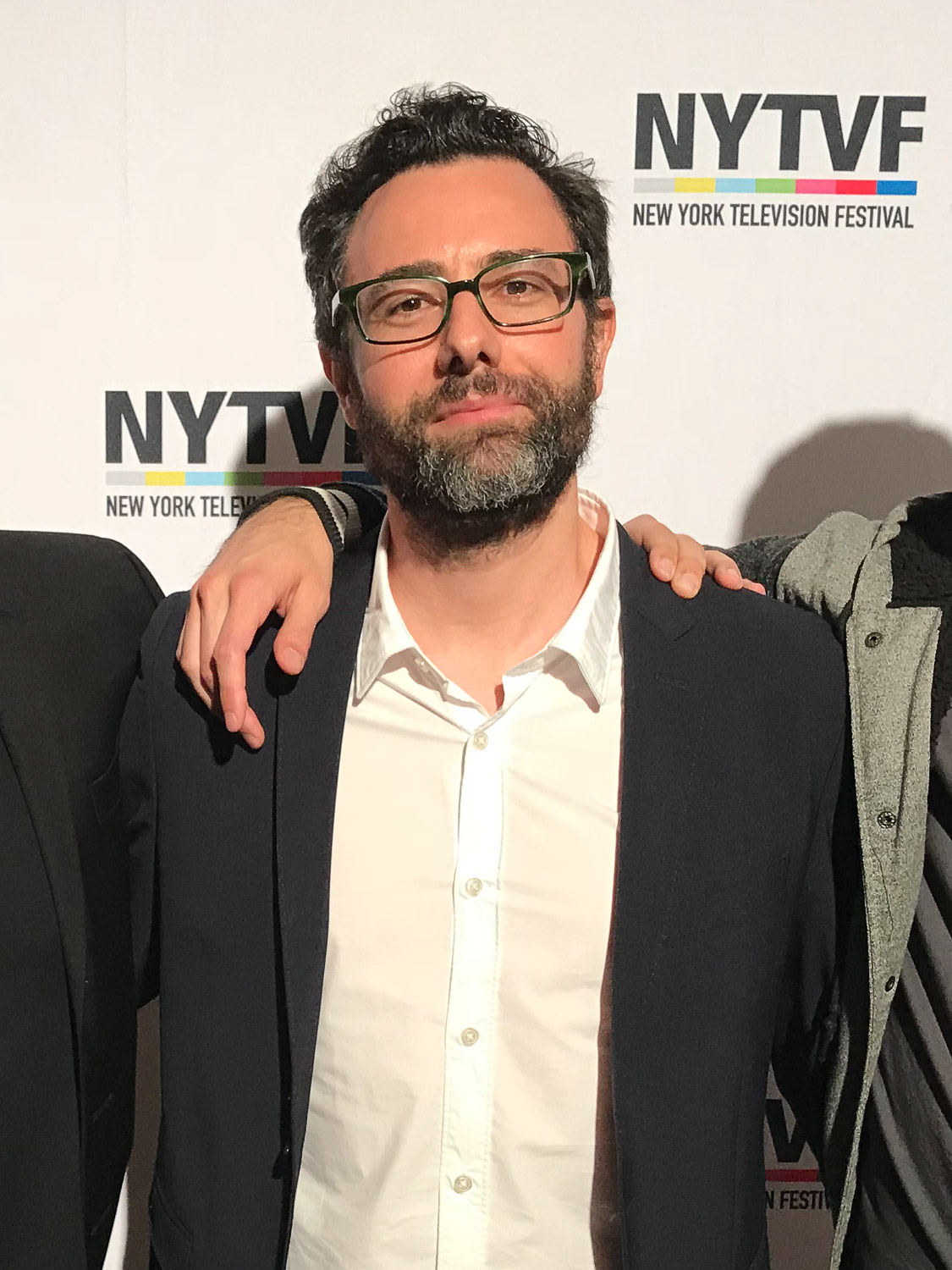
- Galfer at the New York Television Festival
- Born: October 18, 1979 (age 46); Barrington, Illinois, U.S.
- Education: University of Evansville (BS); American Conservatory Theater (MFA)
- Occupations: Actor, producer, writer, entrepreneur
- Years active: 2005–present
- Spouse: Cody Elderkin

Jeff Galfer (born October 18, 1979) is an American actor, producer, writer, and entrepreneur who has appeared on television shows such as Homeland, Hawaii Five-0, Steven Spielberg and Jason Blum's The River, the CBS series Scorpion, and the Titmouse, Inc. animated series Little Big Awesome, where he voiced multiple characters.

In 2011, Galfer captured the recurring role of Sammy Kirsch in ABC's The River. A few years later, he landed the recurring role of Dr. Quincy Berkstead - the annoying, psychologist husband of Amy Berkstead (played by Shooter star Shantel VanSanten) and hated nemesis of Toby Curtis (played by American Pie film series star Eddie Kaye Thomas in the CBS series Scorpion.

During this time, Galfer raised $25,000 on Kickstarter to produce his first, short film Buried Treasure directed by longtime TV actress and director Leslie Hope. The film starred a number of recognizable folks including Eloise Mumford, Gregg Henry, and Crista Flanagan.

In 2016, Galfer (along with his creative partners Sky Soleil and Andrew Fleischer) created the absurdist web series Jeff's Place, which was accepted as a finalist to the independent pilot competition at Denver's Seriesfest and to the New York Television Festival (NYTVF) pilot competition, where Galfer won Best Actor in a Comedy and the show's director/editor Kent Lamm won Best Editor.

Shortly after, Galfer was recognized as an Alumni Legend of Barrington High School (Illinois), where he attended school and participated heavily in the theater department in the late 1990s.

Galfer helmed the La Quinta How To Win @ Business campaigns and the 1893 Pepsi-Cola Company campaigns, where he played an irreverent, soda sommelier. The 1893 campaign ultimately drew strong praise for its marketing success.

In 2023, Galfer founded Gladfellow, an everyday carry brand focused on curated heritage goods; in February 2026, the brand was relaunched under the name Last Manner, as covered by men's lifestyle publication The Coolector.

== Personal life ==
Galfer was born in Barrington, Illinois, a suburb of Chicago. He graduated from the University of Evansville in Indiana and went to American Conservatory Theater where he obtained a graduate degree in acting. He is married to Los Angeles-based interior designer Cody Elderkin.

== Filmography ==
=== Film ===
Year	Title	Role	Notes
2012	Buried Treasure	Mark	
2014	Love & Mercy	Hipster #2	
2015	6 Ways to Die	Hunter	

=== Television ===
Year	Show	Role	Notes
2005-2006	Guiding Light	Chicago Cop	
2005-2011	All My Children	Dr. Burke	
2006	Law & Order (TV series)	Dr. Brooks	
2008	Z Rock	Paramedic	
2009	Numb3rs	Bus Tech	
2011	The River	Sammy Kirsch	
2011	Castle	Henry Barnett	
2014	NCIS	CIA Case Officer Victor Hodge	
2015-2018	Scorpion	Quincy Berkstead	
2016	Jeff's Place	Jeff	
2017	Chance	Atticus	
2018	Little Big Awesome	Radish Dad/Ash Tree/Street Light/The Projector/Bottle Rockets/Happy Tourist	
2019	Hawaii Five-0	Jim Walker	
2020	All American	Dr. Elijah Evert	
2020	Homeland	Paul Bachman	
2022	The Patient	David Strauss	
2023	Your Honor	Fred Grayson	
2023	I Think You Should Leave with Tim Robinson	Roger Beeboo	
2024	Griselda	Kevin	
2024	The Corps	Brayden Husk	
2025	9-1-1	Soren	
2025	The Morning Show	Kenneth Stockton	
