= Paul Scheer =

American comedian (born 1976)

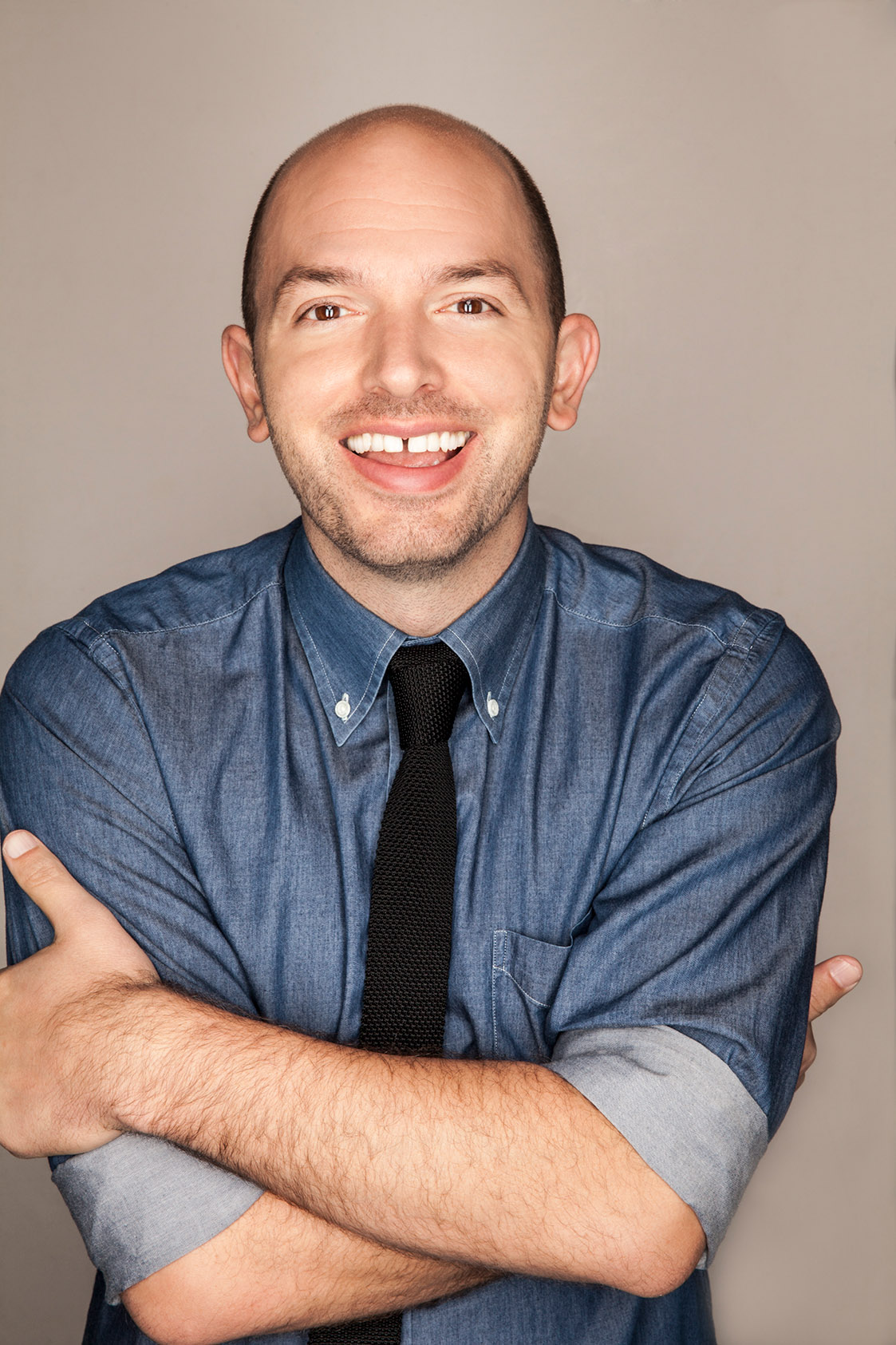
- Scheer in 2016
- Born: Paul Christian Scheer; January 31, 1976 (age 50); Huntington, New York, U.S.
- Other name: Tall John Scheer
- Education: New York University (BA)
- Occupations: Comedian; actor; podcaster; writer; director; producer
- Years active: 1998–present
- Spouse: June Diane Raphael (m. 2009)
- Children: 2
- Website: paulscheer.com

Paul Christian Scheer (born January 31, 1976) is an American comedian, actor, filmmaker, and podcaster. Scheer is best known for his roles in FX/FXX's The League and Showtime's comedy series Black Monday. Scheer also co-created and starred in MTV's Human Giant and Adult Swim's series NTSF:SD:SUV::, and has had recurring roles on ABC's Fresh Off the Boat and HBO's Veep. He is also known for voicing Chip Whistler in Disney’s Big City Greens.

Away from his acting work, Scheer also co-hosts two film discussion podcasts: How Did This Get Made?, alongside his wife June Diane Raphael and longtime collaborator Jason Mantzoukas, and Unspooled with film critic Amy Nicholson.

Scheer is the author of a memoir, Joyful Recollections of Trauma, which was published by HarperCollins in May 2024, and became a New York Times Bestseller.

== Early life and education ==
Scheer was born in Huntington, New York, to Gail Ann (Decarlo) and William Paul Scheer. Scheer attended Catholic schools during his childhood and graduated from St. Anthony's High School. Scheer began performing in high school with Chicago City Limits, a New York-based short-form improv group. He later attended New York University, where he majored in communication and education. Scheer often speaks about his early life on the How Did This Get Made? podcast.

== Career ==
=== Live performances ===
In 1995, Scheer became a member of New York City's longest-running Off-Broadway comedy show, Chicago City Limits. As a member of their touring company, Scheer extensively traveled throughout the United States and overseas.

In 1998, while at NYU, Scheer started performing at the Upright Citizens Brigade Theater in New York City. Scheer performed in multiple weekly shows, including Talk Show, The Real Real World and the house team Respecto Montalban. The group included Rob Riggle, Rob Huebel, Jack McBrayer, and Dannah Feinglass. They performed long-form improvisation to sold-out crowds every Saturday night for over five years and starred in a political sketch comedy show called George Bush is a Motherfucker.

In 2002, Scheer created and starred in Automatic Vaudeville at the Ars Nova theater, which The Hollywood Reporter called "one of the top five shows in the country".

In 2006, Scheer moved to Los Angeles and has been a regular performer at Upright Citizens Brigade Theatre in Los Angeles (UCBTLA). He performed an improvised show based on audience members' Facebook profiles called FACEBOOK. The show was named the "Best Improv Show" by Los Angeles magazine and has been profiled on Good Morning America. Cast members include McBrayer, Riggle, and Huebel.

=== Television ===
In 2003, Scheer was hired as a writer and performer for Oxygen’s Meow TV. Meow TV was a project by Meow Mix that aired programming for cats and their owners.

==== Best Week Ever ====
From 2004 to the conclusion of the show’s first run in 2009, Scheer was a regular cast member on VH1’s Best Week Ever. Scheer was selected to be part of a live tour featuring comedians from the show in 2005. Other panelists included Nick Kroll, John Mulaney, and Patton Oswalt.

==== Human Giant ====
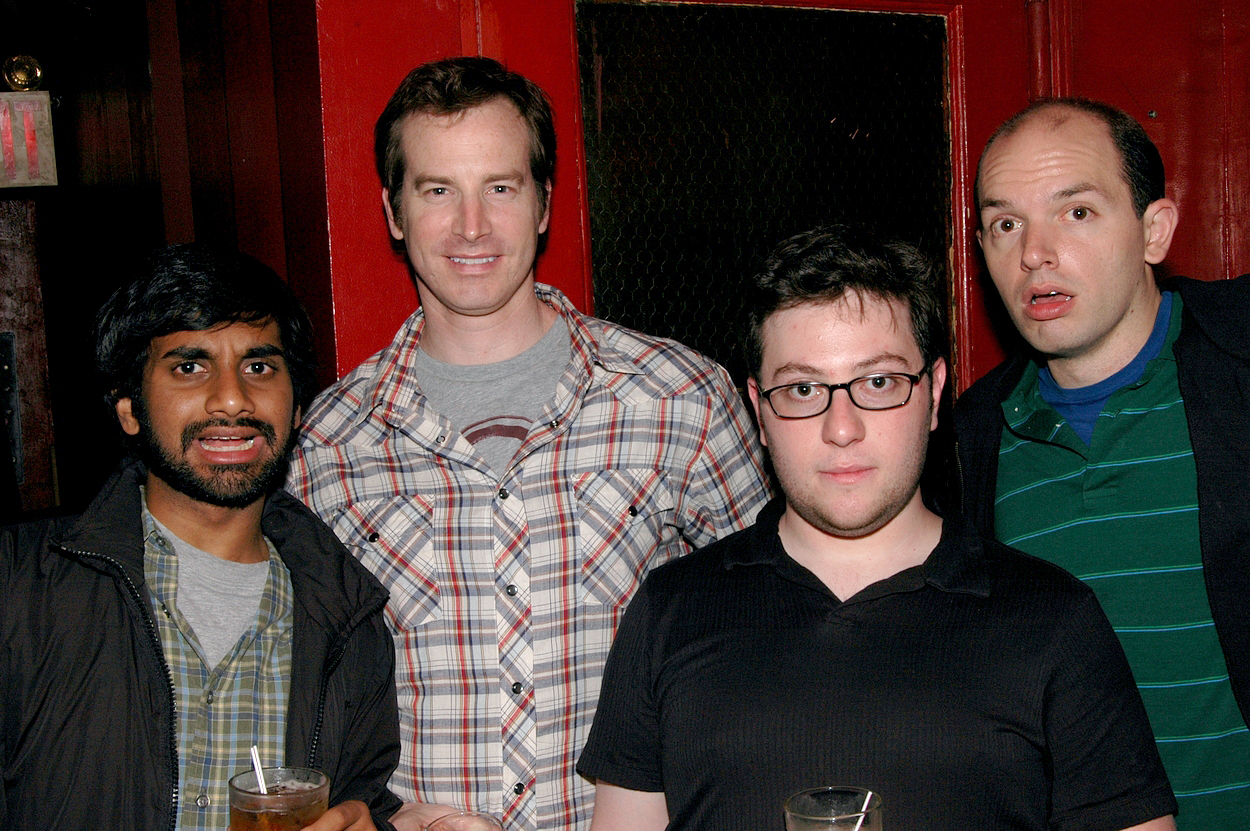
Human Giant's Aziz Ansari, Rob Huebel, Jason Woliner and Paul Scheer in May 2007

In 2005, Scheer began collaborating with comedians Rob Huebel, Aziz Ansari, and Jason Woliner on short films. Their first videos were Shutterbugs and Illusionators. Shutterbugs saw Huebel and Ansari play talent agents for child actors, and llusionators, starred Ansari and Scheer as Criss Angel-style magicians. In mid-2006, MTV greenlit a sketch series from the trio, called Human Giant. The series debuted April 5, 2007, and ran for two seasons from 2007 to 2008, exploring comedic aspects of modern life and pop culture.

==== The League ====
In 2009, Scheer joined the semi-scripted FX comedy, The League, from Jeff and Jackie Marcus Schaffer about a group of friends in a fantasy football league. Scheer plays Dr. Andre Nowzick, a rich plastic surgeon whose naivete makes him the butt of many jokes. Scheer co-scripted a handful of episodes: "The Anniversary Party," "Expert Witness," "The Out of Towner," and "Tailgate" with co-star Nick Kroll; he co-wrote the episode "Bringer Show" with Stephen Rannazzisi and was the sole credited writer of episode 81, "The Block." The series premiered on October 29, 2009, and ran for seven seasons through December 2015.

==== NTSF:SD:SUV:: (National Terrorism Strike Force: San Diego: Sport Utility Vehicle) ====
In 2009, Scheer created a 15-minute spoof commercial for an action series called NTSF:SD:SUV:: (National Terrorism Strike Force: San Diego: Sport Utility Vehicle), that aired on Adult Swim. Shortly after airing, it was picked up as a series and ran for three seasons (40+ episodes). Scheer played Trent Hauser. The cast included Kate Mulgrew, Rebecca Romijn, Martin Starr, June Diane Raphael (Scheer's wife), Rob Riggle, Brandon Johnson, and the voice of Peter Serafinowicz as S.A.M. Scheer served as executive producer, writer, director, and actor. It was produced by Abominable Pictures, Inc. and Scheer's 2nd Man on the Moon Productions. The show concluded with a special “movie event” shot in London, which was made to look like San Diego.

==== Fresh Off the Boat ====
In 2015, Scheer joined the cast of Fresh Off the Boat, an ABC comedy loosely based on a memoir by chef Eddie Huang. Scheer played the recurring role of Mitch, whom Eddie Huang hired to be the host at a steakhouse restaurant. He appeared in 26 episodes over the show's six seasons.

==== Veep ====
In 2017, Scheer joined the sixth season of Veep as the character Stevie, the producer of CBS Morning News Show. He won a SAG Award for an Outstanding Performance by a Cast or Ensemble in a Comedy Series. In 2020, Scheer returned to the cast of Veep along with other special guests, including Don Cheadle, Mark Hamill, Beanie Feldstein, Stephen Colbert, and Bryan Cranston in a live table read playing multiple roles to support turnout for the Georgia runoff elections.

==== Black Monday ====
In 2018, Scheer joined the Showtime pilot for Black Monday. The show is an ensemble period comedy about the Wall Street crash in 1987 and premiered on Showtime on January 20, 2019. Scheer plays Keith, a closeted stockbroker who was originally scripted to die in the first season. That plotline was later altered. Black Monday aired for three seasons, concluding in 2021. Scheer's performance was named in the Hollywood Reporter's "top 30 best supporting characters on TV" in 2019.

==== Other work ====
Scheer has appeared in recurring roles on 30 Rock, The Good Place, Future Man, I'm Sorry, and the Nick Jr. Channel series Yo Gabba Gabba!. Scheer also had recurring animated series appearances on Star Trek: Lower Decks, Big City Greens, Big Mouth, and Adventure Time. Scheer and Jack McBrayer made semi-regular appearances on Yo Gabba Gabba!, during a segment called "Knock Knock Joke of the Day". They were featured as themselves in the Yo Gabba Gabba! comic book, and made appearances on the Yo Gabba Gabba! live tour. In 2012, Scheer appeared as a villainous Cowboy Android in an episode of The Aquabats! Super Show!, another series from the creators of Yo Gabba Gabba!

Scheer appeared as a contestant on the second season of Nailed it! Holiday. He won the competition, but chose not to keep the $10,000 prize, and instead split it between the other two contestants. In August 2015, Scheer and Rob Huebel created a comedy special on a moving bus, Crash Test, produced by Paramount and released on Comedy Central. In 2017, he appeared on Celebrity Family Feud and lost to his wife, June.

=== Producing ===
In addition to acting, Scheer has produced The Hotwives for Hulu, Party Over Here for Fox, Drive Share for Go90, Filthy Preppy Teen$ for FullScreen, The Amazing Gayle Pyle for Seeso, and Unsend for Comedy Central. In 2016, in addition to executive producing Party Over Here, Scheer created and directed segments for the late-night sketch comedy series with The Lonely Island. It starred Nicole Byer, Alison Rich, and Jessica McKenna.

Scheer and Jonathan Stern are executive producers on the Hulu comedy series The Hotwives. Scheer also co-stars in the series.

=== Internet and streaming projects ===
Scheer and Rob Huebel are co-creators and directors on the Go90 comedy series Drive Share. Scheer also co-created Filthy Preppy Teen$ with Curtis James Gwinn and Jon Stern.

In 2013, upon the return of The Arsenio Hall Show, Scheer launched a web series for JASH called The ArScheerio Paul Show. In each episode, Scheer re-creates interviews from Arsenio Hall's original show, including the famous Bill Clinton episode, with Will Arnett playing Clinton. Scheer sports a comically enlarged flat-top haircut to resemble Hall.

In 2014, Scheer co-wrote and co-starred in multiple episodes of the Adult Swim mockumentary, The Greatest Event in Television History, detailing the recreation of famous television show openings. In 2015, Scheer launched a follow-up web series with JASH to Arscheerio Paul called, ScheeRL, which recreates interviews from MTV's Total Request Live hosted by Carson Daly, with Scheer playing the role of Daly and various comedians playing the musician guests.

In 2016 Scheer lent his voice to the first Vine animated series White Ninja as the titular character. In 2017 Scheer produced and starred in Playdates, the first independent pilot to debut at Sundance Group, alongside Carla Gallo.

In 2020, Scheer started the FriendZone Channel on Twitch, where he and other comedians put on weekly shows. Their streams have raised money for charities like Miles for Migrants & Feeding America. In 2021, Scheer's YouTube web series, Marvel Presents The World's Greatest Book Club, won an honorary Webby for best reality program.

=== Podcasting ===
How Did This Get Made? a podcast hosted by Scheer, his wife June Diane Raphael, and Jason Mantzoukas launched in 2010 on Earwolf. Each episode has a celebrity guest/comedian and features the deconstruction and mockery of terrible films. In 2011, iTunes selected How Did This Get Made? as its favorite comedy podcast of the year. In 2012, LA Weekly named the show "The Best Comedy Podcast." Guests have included Kevin Smith, Damon Lindelof, "Weird" Al Yankovic, Danny Trejo, Vanilla Ice, Adam Scott, Tatiana Maslany, and Nick Kroll. In 2022 and 2024, How Did This Get Made? won the iHeartRadio Podcast Award for best TV & film podcast. The podcast also won the 2022 and 2024 Ambie Award for Best Comedy Podcast.

In 2018, Scheer started Unspooled, a podcast dedicated to watching and discussing all 100 films on the American Film Institute's top movies of all time, with co-host Amy Nicholson. Unspooled was well received by the press, earning top reviews from Esquire, Vanity Fair, Town & Country, Vulture, and Rolling Stone. In 2021, Scheer was involved with HBO Max's scripted podcast, Batman: The Audio Adventures.

Scheer also co-founded Wolfpop which later merged with Earwolf.

=== Comics ===
In 2014, Scheer ventured into comics with writing partner Nick Giovannetti to create a 5-part Boom mini-series, ALIENS vs. PARKER. In 2015, he appeared in The Astonishing Ant-Man #4 by Nick Spencer and Ramon Rosanas, after co-writing a team-up between Ant-Man and Drax the Destroyer in Guardians Team-Up #7.

Scheer and Giovanetti continued their collaboration with Marvel Comics, where they penned Deadpool Bi-Annual #1, a Guardians Team Up, which were released September 2014 and 2015. More recently, they wrote for Marvel "Spider-Man-Deadpool" (2017) and "Cosmic Ghost Rider Destroys Marvel History" (2019).

Scheer and Giovanetti have also written for DC Comics: Harley Quinn: Black + White + Redder, #1 (Get Gaggy); The Harley Quinn short story "It's a Horrible Life" which he co-wrote with Nick Giovanetti, Steve Lieber, Marissa Louise, and Carlos M. Mangual; and Batman: The Audio Adventures Special, a prequel to the podcast series Scheer voiced. Other writers for the comic include Dennis McNicholas, Bobby Moynihan and Heidi Gardner.

=== Author ===
In May 2024, Scheer released his memoir Joyful Recollections of Trauma, which quickly became a New York Times Bestseller for Hardcover Nonfiction. Scheer explores the trauma that occurred in his childhood and the impact these experiences had on his life and career. Scheer combines dark anecdotes with self-deprecating humor, offering readers an engaging and uplifting narrative. The memoir also highlights Scheer's journey to self-acceptance and his reflections on fatherhood and family life, providing a look at his personal growth. Critics have praised the book for its balance of humor and sincerity, making it a compelling read for fans of both comedy and memoirs.

== Philanthropy and activism ==
In 2008, along with fellow comedians Rob Riggle, Horatio Sanz, and Rob Huebel, Scheer completed four USO comedy shows for American troops in Iraq.

In 2010, Scheer organized a charity event with Ben Stiller called A Night of 140 Tweets, in which he got 140 comedians and actors to appear on stage at the UCB Theater in Los Angeles, each of them reading a single tweet. The performers included Stiller, Will Ferrell, Ashton Kutcher, Demi Moore, Aziz Ansari, the cast of It's Always Sunny in Philadelphia, Dane Cook, Wilmer Valderrama, John Cho, Mindy Kaling, and Sasha Grey. The event, released as a charity DVD and online download, raised over $500,000 for Haiti.

In 2019, Scheer was arrested during Jane Fonda’s Fire Drill Friday demonstration on the Capitol steps in Washington DC. Scheer also helped organize The Big 100, a program that asked Americans to take progressive actions in the 100 days following President Donald Trump's inauguration.

On November 2, 2022, Scheer told Twitter followers that his mail-in ballot had not arrived and thanked nonpartisan voter advocate organization VoteRiders for letting him know what credentials he needed to vote in person.

In 2023, Scheer co-hosted "The Give Back-ular Spectacular," a live telethon-style fundraiser at the Orpheum Theatre in Los Angeles, which raised funds to support TV and film crew members affected by the WGA and SAG-AFTRA strikes. Scheer and June Diane Raphael hosted the 2024 Humanitas Prizes event, supporting writers who explore the human condition and raising funds for programs like the New Voices Fellowship and College Screenwriting Awards.

Scheer also directed and starred in a public service announcement titled "Fake Happy" for Oklahoma’s 988 Mental Health Lifeline during Super Bowl LVIII, emphasizing the importance of mental health awareness.

== Personal life ==
Scheer is married to actress-writer June Diane Raphael. In October 2009, Scheer and Raphael married at the Santa Barbara Museum of Natural History, where Scheer's best man was a Jack Nicholson impersonator. They have two sons. Scheer has frequently vacationed at Walt Disney World since childhood; in 2020, he said he had outgrown the reliance he had on the park when he was younger, but said that it remained "such a part of my life, for better or worse" and that he enjoyed visiting with his children. He is a fan of the Los Angeles Clippers, having begun following the team when he moved to Los Angeles from New York in 2006.

== Filmography ==
=== Film ===
Year	Title	Role	Notes
2004	Blackballed: The Bobby Dukes Story	Lenny Pear	
2006	School for Scoundrels	Little Pete	
2007	Watching the Detectives	Know It All Customer	
2007	Slice	Tucker Taylor	Short film
2008	The Onion Movie	Bates Computer Salesman Dirk	
2008	Meet Dave	Lieutenant Kneecap	
2009	Bride Wars	Ricky Coo	
2009	The Smallest Co%k in Porn	Ryan French	Video short
2009	Year One	Bricklayer	
2010	Weird: The Al Yankovic Story	Club MC	Video short
2010	Piranha 3D	Andrew Cunningham	
2010	Tron: Legacy	Hopper	Uncredited cameo
2011	The Valet	The Valet	Video short
2011	Kung Fu Panda: Secrets of the Masters	Master Thundering Rhino	Voice; video short
2012	Piranha 3DD	Andrew Cunningham	
2013	Hell Baby	Ron	
2013	Ass Backwards	Strip Club Owner	
2013	Escape from Planet Earth	Cameraman	Voice
2013	Rapture-Palooza	Security Wraith	
2013	OJ: The Musical	Dr. Love	
2014	Jason Nash Is Married	Bill Morrison	
2014	Repeat Stuff	Agent	Video short
2015	Hell and Back	Paul the Demon	Voice
2015	Daddy's Home	The Whip	
2016	Donald Trump's The Art of the Deal: The Movie	Roy Cohn	
2016	Nerdland	Marvin Masterson	Voice
2016	Popstar: Never Stop Never Stopping	Wolf Handler	
2016	Opening Night	Ron	
2016	Army of One	Pickles	
2017	The Disaster Artist	Raphael Smadja	
2017	Best F(r)iends	Malmo	
2018	A Futile and Stupid Gesture	Paul Shaffer	
2018	Summer '03	Ned	
2018	Slice	Jack	
2019	Long Shot	Wembley News Anchor #2	
2020	Have a Good Trip: Adventures in Psychedelics	Himself	Documentary
2020	Emperor	Duvane Henderson	
2020	Archenemy	Krieg	
2020	For Madmen Only: The Stories of Del Close	The Rat	
2020	The Last Blockbuster	Himself	Documentary
2021	How It Ends	Dave	
2021	Happily	Val	
2023	Family Switch	Steven	
2024	The Gutter	Crantley	
2024	Twisters	Airport Traffic Police	
2026	Stop! That! Train!	Male Passenger 1	

=== Television ===
Year	Title	Role	Notes
1998–2000	Upright Citizens Brigade	Multiple Roles	6 episodes
2001	Burly TV	Various	Episode: "Impostor"
2004	Crossballs: The Debate Show	Additional Characters	
2005–2007	Shutterbugs	Sugarplums Agent / Nasim	4 episodes
2006	Starveillance	Ashton Kutcher	Pilot episode
2007	Raines	Motel Clerk	Pilot episode
2007–2008	Human Giant	Paul / Various	21 episodes, also creator, writer, executive producer
2007–2008	30 Rock	Donny Lawson	2 episodes
2008	10 Items or Less	Francis	Episode: "The Bromance"
2008–2013	Yo Gabba Gabba!	Himself	8 episodes
2009	Reno 911!	Various	3 episodes
2009	Parks and Recreation	Keef Slertner	Episode: "Kaboom"
2009–2015	The League	Andre	84 episodes, also writer
2010	The Sarah Silverman Program	Producer	Episode: "A Slip Slope"
2010	Players	Tony Maroni	Episode: "Krista's Mom"
2010	Party Down	Joel Munt	Episode: "Joel Munt's Big Deal Party"
2010	Pretend Time	Dr. Bruce	Episode: "Monday Morning Meltdown"
2010–2011	Funny or Die Presents	Barry / Lionel	6 episodes
2010–2016	Childrens Hospital	Sir Tinkle Button	4 episodes, also writer and director
2011	Traffic Light	Glenn G.	Episode: "No Good Deed"
2011	The Problem Solverz	Tony Marv (voice)	Episode: "Funny Facez"
2011–2012	Happy Endings	Avi	2 episodes
2011–2013	NTSF:SD:SUV::	Trent Hauser	39 episodes, also creator, writer, director, executive producer
2012	The Life & Times of Tim	Mitch (voice)	Episode: "Strip Club Hostage Situation/Game Night"
2012	The Aquabats! Super Show!	The Cowboy Android Sheriff	Episode: "Cowboy Android!"
2012	Bob's Burgers	Larry (voice)	Episode: "Food Truckin'"
2012	Electric City	Walter LaFong (voice)	21 episodes
2012	Modern Family	Costco Manager	Episode: "When a Tree Falls"
2012	Tron: Uprising	Hopper (voice)	5 episodes
2012–2013	Burning Love	Robby Z / Kip	8 episodes
2012–2013	The Greatest Event in Television History	Trace Goron / Protester	3 episodes, also executive producer
2012–2015	Comedy Bang! Bang!	Various	3 episodes
2013	Whitney	Phillip	Episode: "Alex, Meet Lily"
2013	The ArScheerio Paul Show	ArScheerio Paul	9 episodes, also creator
2013	The Arsenio Hall Show	ArScheerio Paul	1 episode
2013	Clear History	Dinner Friend	Television film
2013	Paranormal Roommates	Bigfoot (voice)	Pilot
2013–2017	Adventure Time	Toronto / Bath Boy Gang Leader (voice)	5 episodes
2014	Next Time on Lonny	Gun Store Clerk	Episode: "Lonny's Best Friend"
2014	The Hotwives of Orlando	Matty Green	7 episodes, also executive producer
2014	Gravity Falls	Gary (voice)	Episode: "Soos and the Real Girl"
2014	The Birthday Boys	Mayor	Episode: "Snobs and Slobs"
2014–2018	Drunk History	Various	3 episodes
2015	Kroll Show	Marc XYZ	Episode: "Gigolo H-O-R-S-E"
2015	Scheer-RL	Carson Daly	7 episodes, also creator
2015	Wet Hot American Summer: First Day of Camp	Dave	2 episodes
2015	Regular Show	Cat Masterson (voice)	Episode: "Cat Videos"
2015	The Hotwives of Las Vegas	Vance Storm / Matty Green	7 episodes, also executive producer
2015	Crash Test: With Rob Huebel and Paul Scheer	Paul	Television film; also writer and producer
2015–2019	Fresh Off the Boat	Mitch	25 episodes
2016	Animals	White Horse (voice)	Episode: "Rats."
2016	Once Upon a Time	The Scarecrow (voice)	Episode: "Our Decay"
2016	Party Over Here	Chris Harrison / Binoculars Dad	2 episodes, also creator, director, executive producer
2016	Bajillion Dollar Propertie$	Reverend Coyne	Episode: "Happy Ending"
2016	Filthy Preppy Teen$	Mr. Lapierre	Episode #1.5, also creator, writer, director, executive producer
2016	Grace and Frankie	Kyle	Episode: "The Loophole"
2016	Blunt Talk	Barry	3 episodes
2016	Ultimate Spider-Man	Quentin Beck (voice)	Episode: "The Moon Knight Before Christmas"
2016–2018	The Amazing Gayl Pile	Terrin	5 episodes, also executive producer
2016–2021	Apple & Onion	Hot Dog / Various (voice)	18 episodes
2017	Drive Share	Driver / Apocalyptic Passenger	4 episodes, also creator, writer, director, and executive producer
2017	Workaholics	Fest Manager	Episode: "Party Gawds"
2017	Wet Hot American Summer: Ten Years Later	Dave	3 episodes
2017	HarmonQuest	Sensodyne	Episode: "Into the Abyss"
2017	Lady Dynamite	Gayle	Episode: "Fridge Over Troubled Daughter"
2017	Do You Want To See a Dead Body?	Himself	Episode: "A Body and an Ex-Roommate"
2017	Brooklyn Nine-Nine	Devin Cathertaur	Episode: "Game Night"
2017–2019	Veep	Stevie	9 episodes Screen Actors Guild Award for Outstanding Performance by an Ensemble in a Comedy Series
2017–2019	I'm Sorry	Todd	2 episodes
2017–2019	Future Man	Paul / Man at Video Game Store	4 episodes
2017–2025	Big Mouth	Kurt Bilzerian / Various (voice)	13 episodes
2018	Another Period	Pablo Picasso	Episode: "Lucky Chang's"
2018	Rob Riggle's Ski Master Academy	Gary	8 episodes
2018	Little Big Awesome	Raymond (voice)	Episode: "Snow Day / Rootin' for Change"
2018–2025	Big City Greens	Chip Whistler (voice)	Recurring role
2019	Rise of the Teenage Mutant Ninja Turtles	Ben Sando (voice)	Episode: "The Evil League of Mutants"
2019	Desus & Mero	Keith	Episode: "On Deckington"
2019	American Dad!	Possum Dave (voice)	2 episodes
2019	Nailed It!	Himself	Episode: "Shalo-many Fails!"
2019–2020	The Good Place	Chuck	4 episodes
2019–2020	The Real Bros of Simi Valley	Dr. Pissing	2 episodes
2019–2021	Black Monday	Keith Shankar	30 episodes
2020	Curb Your Enthusiasm	Frank	Episode: "The Spite Store"
2020	Marvel's 616	Himself	Episode: "Lost and Found", also director
2020–2021	Crank Yankers	Shawn Collins / Mitch (voice)	2 episodes
2020–2024	Star Trek: Lower Decks	Lieutenant Commander Andy Billups (voice)	25 episodes
2021	The Goldbergs	Garrison Whitby	Episode: "Cocoon"
2021	Archibald's Next Big Thing Is Here	Sarge (voice)	Episode: "Singing Tele-Grammers"
2021	Q-Force	Carter Doppelbaum (voice)	Episode: "The Secretaries' Ball"
2021	Fast & Furious Spy Racers	Commander White (voice)	Episode: "Incineration Day"
2021–2024	The Loud House	Gus (voice)	4 episodes
2022	The Good Fight	Matt Brittel	Episode: "The End of Ginni"
2023	History of the World, Part II	Bot Seed Vendor	Episode: "I"
2023	Moon Girl and Devil Dinosaur	Marty Muzzler (voice)	Episode: "Like Mother, Like Moon Girl"
2023	The Afterparty	Leonard Vurr	Episode: "Danner's Fire"
2024	Night Court	Carnes	Episode: "Hold the Pickles, Keep the Change"
2024	Knuckles	Gary N. Sinclair III Esq.	2 episodes
2024	Batman: Caped Crusader	Aaron and Ronald Cobblepot (voice)	Episode: "In Treacherous Waters"
2024	Dinner Time Live with David Chang	Himself (guest)	Episode: "Japanese Convenience Store"
2024	Krapopolis	Eurynomos (voice)	Episode: "Hades Nuts"
2025	St. Denis Medical	Ruben	Episode: "No Wonder His Kidney Wants Out"
2026	Adventure Time: Side Quests	Prophet Gnome / Toronto (voice)	Episode: ''The Prophecy"
2026	Is It Cake? Halloween	Himself (Judge)	Episode: "Scaring up a winner"
