= Rob Riggle's Ski Master Academy =

- Genre: Sitcom
- Created by: Rob Riggle; Bennett Webber; Chris Pizzi
- Starring: Dave (Gruber) Allen; Britt Baron; Eliza Coupe; Samm Levine; Rizwan Manji; Billy Merritt; Alison Rich; Carl Tart; Rob Riggle
- Theme music composer: Darren Leader
- Country of origin: United States
- Original language: English
- No. of seasons: 1
- No. of episodes: 8

Production
- Executive producers: Bennett Webber; Chris Pizzi; Tom Lesinski; Jenna Santoianni; Keith Quinn; Jonathan Stern; Rob Riggle
- Producers: Franny Baldwin; David Soldinger
- Cinematography: Frank Barrera
- Editors: Nicholas Gallucci; Daniel Fleshler
- Camera setup: Single-camera
- Running time: 22 minutes
- Production companies: Abominable Pictures; Haunted Steel Mill; Sonar Entertainment

Original release
- Network: Crackle
- Release: August 23, 2018

Rob Riggle's Ski Master Academy is an American sitcom starring Rob Riggle that premiered on August 23, 2018 on Crackle.

== Premise ==
Rob Riggle's Ski Master Academy follows Rob Riggle, "who is mostly known for his legendary ski master movies, has invested all of his money and reputation into an Academy celebrating America’s truest art form – personal watercraft riding. Rob, his legendary stunt man commandant Dirk Hamsteak and their entire staff of instructors spend a semester defending their beloved Academy at all costs. No matter how many people criticize it...go missing...or die!"

== Cast and characters ==
=== Main ===
- Dave (Gruber) Allen as Gil
- Britt Baron as Brit Brit Hamsteak
- Eliza Coupe as Preggers
- Samm Levine as Jeb
- Rizwan Manji as Todd
- Billy Merritt as Dirk Hamsteak
- Alison Rich as Chandler
- Carl Tart as Chauncy
- Rob Riggle as himself

=== Recurring ===
- Paul Scheer as Gary
- Brian Urlacher as himself
- Tim Meadows as Lake Commissioner
- Dermot Mulroney as himself
- Christopher McDonald as Jim Bassman
- Noël Wells as Karen the Mermaid
- David Arquette as himself
- Haley Joel Osment as Gaston Lebone
- Richard "Cheech" Marin as Condor de Bogota

=== Guest ===
- Jackée Harry as Hog Queen ("Hog Hunt")
- Jamie-Lynn Sigler as herself ("Hog Hunt")
- Jamie Chung as Ghost Skier ("Big Timed")
- Beth Dover as C.A.R.O.L. / Goody

== Episodes ==
No.	Title	Directed by	Written by	Original release date
1	"Big Timed"	Alex Fernie	Story by : Rob Riggle, Bennett Webber, & Chris Pizzi; Teleplay by : Duncan Birmingham	August 23, 2018
2	"The Bassman Cometh"	Lauren Ludwig	Sean O'Connor	August 23, 2018
3	"Into The Reeds"	Alex Fernie	Tim Neenan	August 23, 2018
4	"Midterms"	Alex Fernie	Tim Neenan, Sean O'Connor, & Bennett Webber	August 23, 2018
5	"Hog Hunt"	Chris Pizzi	Rob Riggle & Bennett Webber	August 23, 2018
6	"R.I.G.G.L.E. Day"	Chris Pizzi	Jonathan Stern & Bennett Webber	August 23, 2018
7	"Cream Dream"	Lauren Ludwig	Kerry O'Neill	August 23, 2018
8	"Vindication"	Alex Fernie	Jonathan Stern	August 23, 2018

== Production ==
=== Development ===
On January 14, 2018, it was announced that Crackle was developing a new half-hour comedy series written and executive produced by Rob Riggle entitled Rob Riggle's Jet Ski Academy.

On March 29, 2018, it was announced that Crackle had given the show, now titled Rob Riggle's Ski Master Academy, a series order consisting of a first season of eight episodes. The show was created and written by Riggle who is also set to serve as an executive producer alongside Jonathan Stern, Keith Quinn, Bennett Webber, and Chris Pizzi. Production companies involved in the series include Sonar Entertainment and Abominable Pictures. On July 10, 2018, it was announced that the series would premiere on August 23, 2018.

=== Casting ===
Alongside the series order announcement, it was confirmed that the main cast would include Riggle, Billy Merritt, Britt Baron, Eliza Coupe, Dave (Gruber) Allen, Alison Rich, Carl Tart, Samm Levine, and Rizwan Manji. On July 10, 2018, it was announced that Dermot Mulroney, Christopher McDonald, Noël Wells, David Arquette, Jamie-Lynn Sigler, Jamie Chung, and Haley Joel Osment would guest star in the series.

=== Filming ===
Principal photography for the first season took place in Malibu, California.

== Release ==
On July 27, 2018, the first trailer for the series was released.

== Reception ==
In a positive review, Decider's Joel Keller praised the series saying, "Rob Riggle’s Ski Master Academy is a loopy combination of self-awareness, improv craziness, and meta metaness. Does it work all the time? No. But there’s a reason why shows of this ilk, starring Riggle, Scheer, or any combination of their early-’00s UCB alumni buddies is usually good for a guffaw or two: these folks have been doing improv together for 20 years, and the chemistry and ease is always apparent when they perform together."
