= Unspooled =

Film and television commentary podcast

- Genre: Film; History
- Format: Podcast (via streaming or downloadable MP3)
- Language: English

Cast and voices
- Hosted by: Amy Nicholson; Paul Scheer

Music
- Theme music composed by: Mike Cassady

Production
- Length: 1–2 hours

Publication
- Original release: May 17, 2018
- Provider: Earwolf

Related
- Website: www.unspooledpodcast.com

Unspooled is a film podcast on the Earwolf network. It is hosted by film critic Amy Nicholson and actor/comedian Paul Scheer. Initially, the podcast covered the American Film Institute (AFI) Top 100 films. Later episodes of the podcast have covered other classic movies, with the ultimate goal of creating a list of the 100 best movies of all time.

== Format ==
Each episode of Unspooled covers a single film and analyzes its artistic, thematic, and historical significance. Episodes begin with facts about the year the film was released and a summary of the cast and plot. As the hosts debate what works and what doesn't about each movie, they include audio excerpts from the film to illustrate their points, plus supplemental clips such as interviews with the director and cast. Scheer has described the podcast as a "book club where we are watching movies once a week."

Episodes wrap up with a negative review of the film from the time it was released. In Season 1, the show included clips of The Simpson's parodies of the film, if available, to demonstrate the film's continued cultural relevance. In Season 2, the show includes a clip of the top song on the Billboard charts the week of the film's release to examine the film's connection to the zeitgeist.

== Reception ==
Unspooled debuted at number 1 on iTunes Film & TV podcast rankings and number 4 on the iTunes overall top chart.

The podcast has garnered many positive reviews in the popular press. Esquire called it one of the best podcasts of 2019. Rolling Stone wrote that the show was "wildly entertaining" and ranked the show as one of the best podcasts of 2020. Town & Country Magazine lauded it as a "sharp, funny series…[with] charming chemistry," and Vanity Fair noted that the show's "fresh and intriguing takes on venerable movies make for entertaining listening." Vulture called it "funny and accessible." Another article in Vulture noted that "Unspooled is definitely among the best of [the good-film appreciation podcasts]." The A.V. Club described it as "both serious and silly," and The Hollywood Reporter listed the show as an essential film history podcast. IndieWire said that the podcast "provides an interesting context for what does or doesn't remain timeless in the movie world." Discover Pods referred to the show as "slightly more highbrow" than Scheer's companion podcast, How Did This Get Made?, while Emily St. James in Vox complemented its "entertaining segments … [while being] dedicated to placing these movies in their proper historical context."

Other critics have noted that the podcast is as an "absolute joy ... Scheer and Nicholson usually treat even the movies they don't care for with a measure of respect."

The podcast has been recognized for its willingness to take a critical eye to respected classics. One review commented that the show "fuels discussions of whether these movies are truly brilliant, or simply just respected because no one has ever questioned them." Another stated more directly, "Amy and Paul are not afraid to make the point: Do you really need so many movies about Vietnam?"

== Episodes ==
=== Season 1, the AFI list ===
The show began by going through each of the 2007 AFI's 100 Years...100 Movies beginning with Citizen Kane. For the first half of season 1, films were chosen by a random roll of a polyhedral die. At the end of the season, the hosts eliminated 60 films from the AFI list. Many were eliminated because of repeated directors or genres, particularly war films and Westerns. Other films were rejected because the director is believed to have made a better film that should fill the slot instead, such as replacing William Friedkin's The French Connection with The Exorcist. The trimmed list was published as the API List, an acronym of the hosts' names Amy and Paul.

=== Season 2 and beyond ===
Following seasons of Unspooled have grouped films into thematic miniseries. Movies are chosen by the hosts and listeners with the goal of expanding the initial list to represent a more diverse, multi-faceted overview of cinema.

=== Specials, mini-episodes and live episodes ===
Unspooled has produced annual episodes covering each year's Oscars and year-in-review series about the best films of that year. Other special episodes include live shows taped at film festivals and at the Alamo Drafthouse Cinema.

Unspooled also has an ongoing series of mini-episodes called Top 3. On Top 3, a guest is interviewed about the three movies they would add to the top 100 list.

=== List ===
Unspooled episodes

EP#	Title	Release Date
	Season 1	
1	Citizen Kane	May 16, 2018
2	Ben-Hur	May 23, 2018
3	The Wizard of Oz	May 30, 2018
4	Swing Time	June 6, 2018
5	The French Connection	June 13, 2018
6	Titanic	June 20, 2018
7	2001: A Space Odyssey	June 27, 2018
8	Bonnie and Clyde	July 4, 2018
9	Platoon	July 11, 2018
10	The General	July 18, 2018
11	The Shawshank Redemption	July 26, 2018
12	King Kong	August 1, 2018
13	All About Eve	August 8, 2018
14	Double Indemnity	August 16, 2018
15	Singin' In The Rain	August 22, 2018
16	The Sixth Sense	August 30, 2018
17	Taxi Driver	September 6, 2018
18	E.T. The Extra Terrestrial	September 12, 2018
19	High Noon	September 19, 2018
20	Apocalypse Now	September 26, 2018
21	The Lord of the Rings: The Fellowship of the Ring	October 3, 2018
22	Psycho	October 10, 2018
23	Raiders of the Lost Ark	October 17, 2018
24	The African Queen	October 25, 2018
25	Duck Soup	October 31, 2018
26	Listener Questions Special	November 7, 2018
27	Mr. Smith Goes to Washington	November 14, 2018
28	Sophie's Choice	November 21, 2018
29	A Clockwork Orange	November 28, 2018
30	Rocky	December 6, 2018
31	Schindler's List	December 12, 2018
32	It's a Wonderful Life	December 19, 2018
33	In the Heat of the Night	December 26, 2018
34	The Searchers	January 2, 2019
35	Unforgiven	January 9, 2019
36	The Last Picture Show	January 16, 2019
37	Sunset Boulevard	January 23, 2019
38	One Flew Over The Cuckoo's Nest	January 31, 2019
39	Best of 2018: Blockbusters	February 6, 2019
40	Best of 2018: Critic's Picks	February 14, 2019
41	Best of 2018: Listener's Picks	February 20, 2019
42	BONUS: 2019 Oscars	February 25, 2019
43	The Graduate	February 27, 2019
44	Saving Private Ryan	March 7, 2019
45	A Night at the Opera	March 13, 2019
46	West Side Story	March 21, 2019
47	City Lights	March 27, 2019
48	Snow White and the Seven Dwarfs	April 4, 2019
49	All the President's Men	April 10, 2019
50	The Treasure of the Sierra Madre	April 17, 2019
51	Chinatown	April 24, 2019
52	Tootsie	May 1, 2019
53	The Silence of the Lambs	May 8, 2019
54	To Kill A Mockingbird	May 15, 2019
55	Vertigo	May 22, 2019
56	Halfway There Special	May 30, 2019
57	Horror & The AFI List: Live from the Overlook Film Festival	June 6, 2019
58	Midnight Cowboy	June 12, 2019
59	Toy Story	June 19, 2019
60	Do The Right Thing	June 26, 2019
61	The Deer Hunter	July 3, 2019
62	Gone With The Wind	July 11, 2019
63	Who's Afraid of Virginia Woolf	July 17, 2019
64	Pulp Fiction	July 25, 2019
65	Bringing Up Baby	August 1, 2019
66	Nashville	August 8, 2019
67	The Maltese Falcon	August 14, 2019
68	The Philadelphia Story	August 21, 2019
69	Network	August 29, 2019
70	Lawrence of Arabia	September 4, 2019
71	On The Waterfront	September 11, 2019
72	North By Northwest	September 19, 2019
73	Spartacus	September 25, 2019
74	Some Like It Hot	October 3, 2019
75	BONUS REEL: Shea Serrano	October 8, 2019
76	American Graffiti	October 9, 2019
77	BONUS REEL: Joker & Taxi Driver	October 14, 2019
78	The Godfather	October 16, 2019
79	The Godfather Part II	October 23, 2019
80	The Grapes of Wrath	October 30, 2019
81	Forrest Gump	November 6, 2019
82	The Best Years of Our Lives	November 13, 2019
83	BONUS REEL: Lorene Scafaria	November 18, 2019
84	Annie Hall	November 20, 2019
85	BONUS REEL: Rian Johnson	November 25, 2019
86	Raging Bull	November 27, 2019
87	Best of the Decade Pt. 1	December 4, 2019
88	Best of the Decade Pt. 2	December 11, 2019
89	Star Wars	December 18, 2019
90	Best of the Decade Pt. 3	December 25, 2019
91	Best of the Decade Pt. 4	January 1, 2020
92	Dr. Strangelove, or: How I Learned to Stop Worrying and Love the Bomb	January 9, 2020
93	The Gold Rush	January 15, 2020
94	The Wild Bunch	January 22, 2020
95	The Apartment	January 29, 2020
96	2020 Oscars Preview	February 5, 2020
97	The Sound of Music	February 13, 2020
98	Parasite	February 19, 2020
99	LAPOCALYPSE ( Live from Alamo Drafthouse)	February 26, 2020
100	M*A*S*H	March 4, 2020
101	Sunrise	March 12, 2020
102	Rear Window	March 18, 2020
103	12 Angry Men	March 25, 2020
104	Sullivan's Travels	April 1, 2020
105	Easy Rider	April 8, 2020
106	Cabaret	April 16, 2020
107	Yankee Doodle Dandy	April 22, 2020
108	Intolerance	April 29, 2020
109	Goodfellas	May 7, 2020
110	Spool Party: House Party	May 13, 2020
111	The Bridge On The River Kwai	May 20, 2020
112	A Streetcar Named Desire	May 27, 2020
113	Blade Runner	June 4, 2020
114	Shane	June 10, 2020
115	Modern Times	June 17, 2020
116	It Happened One Night	June 24, 2020
117	Jaws	July 1, 2020
118	Butch Cassidy and the Sundance Kid	July 8, 2020
119	Casablanca	July 15, 2020
120	Wrapping Up The AFI 100	July 22, 2020
	Season 2	
121	Coming 8/20: Unspooled Season 2	July 24, 2020
122	Mean Girls	August 19, 2020
123	Stand and Deliver	August 26, 2020
124	The 400 Blows	September 2, 2020
125	Rebel Without A Cause	September 9, 2020
126	Cooley High	September 16, 2020
127	Fast Times At Ridgemont High	September 23, 2020
128	Dazed and Confused	September 30, 2020
129	Frankenstein	October 7, 2020
130	The Babadook	October 14, 2020
131	Night of the Living Dead	October 21, 2020
132	Ganja & Hess	October 28, 2020
133	The Thing	November 4, 2020
134	Raising Arizona	November 11, 2020
135	Tokyo Story	November 18, 2020
136	Eve's Bayou	November 25, 2020
137	The Royal Tenenbaums	December 2, 2020
138	Guess Who's Coming To Dinner	December 9, 2020
139	BONUS: THE GODFATHER, CODA: THE DEATH OF MICHAEL CORLEONE	December 10, 2020
140	BONUS: Screen Test Rattle My Chains	December 14, 2020
141	The Farewell	December 16, 2020
142	Home Alone	December 23, 2020
143	Dogtooth	January 6, 2021
144	When Harry Met Sally	January 13, 2021
145	Chungking Express	January 20, 2021
146	Groundhog Day	January 27, 2021
147	A Place in the Sun	February 3, 2021
148	BONUS: Promising Young Woman	February 9, 2021
149	Eternal Sunshine of the Spotless Mind	February 10, 2022
150	Love and Basketball	February 17, 2021
151	Brokeback Mountain	February 24, 2021
152	The Princess Bride	March 3, 2021
153	Mike Nichols (with Mark Harris)	March 10, 2021
154	Hoosiers	March 17, 2021
155	Brian's Song	March 24, 2021
156	Cool Runnings	March 31, 2021
157	Chariots of Fire	April 7, 2021
158	A League of Their Own	April 14, 2021
159	2021 Oscar Special	April 21, 2021
160	Hoop Dreams	April 28, 2021
161	A Trip to the Moon	May 5, 2021
162	Galaxy Quest	May 12, 2021
163	Spool Party: Big (featuring Lauren Lapkus)	May 19, 2021
164	Screen Test: Darkness In The Force	May 26, 2021
165	Spool Party: Clueless	June 2, 2021
166	Contact	June 9, 2021
167	Alien	June 16, 2021
168	Solaris	June 24, 2021
169	Top 3: Daveed Diggs	June 28, 2021
170	Aliens	June 30, 2021
171	Top 3: Tom Scharpling	July 6, 2021
172	Apollo 13	July 7, 2021
173	Top 3: Karen Gillan	July 13, 2021
174	The State of Summer Blockbusters	July 14, 2021
175	Jurassic Park	July 21, 2021
176	Bonus: Vaccination Hesitation w/ Dr. Kate Grossman	July 28, 2021
177	Men in Black	July 28, 2021
178	Top 3: Steve Zahn	August 3, 2021
179	Back To The Future	August 4, 2021
180	Speed	August 11, 2021
181	The Fugitive	August 18, 2021
182	The Hangover	August 25, 2021
183	Bridesmaids	September 1, 2021
184	Inception	September 8, 2021
185	Mad Max: Fury Road	September 15, 2021
186	Season 2 Finale	September 22, 2021
	Season 3	
187	Top 3: Melanie Lynskey	September 26, 2021
188	The Exorcist	September 29, 2021
189	The Cabinet of Dr. Caligari	October 7, 2021
190	The Texas Chain Saw Massacre	October 13, 2021
191	Top 3: Tim Blake Nelson	October 18, 2021
192	Raw	October 20, 2021
193	Top 3: Ed Brubaker	October 25, 2021
194	The Blair Witch Project	October 27, 2021
195	A Nightmare on Elm Street	November 3, 2021
196	The Nightmare Before Christmas	November 10, 2021
197	Grease	November 17, 2021
198	Chicago	November 24, 2021
199	Lagaan	December 1, 2021
200	Little Shop of Horrors	December 8, 2021
201	Love Actually	December 15, 2021
202	The Matrix	December 22, 2021
203	A Christmas Story	December 29, 2021
204	Fargo	January 12, 2022
205	Scream	January 19, 2022
206	Frozen	January 26, 2022
207	Top 3: Brian Cox	January 31, 2022
208	The Grand Budapest Hotel	February 2, 2022
209	Jackass	February 9, 2022
210	Force Majeure	February 16, 2022
211	Remembering Ivan Reitman	February 21, 2022
212	The Shining	February 23, 2022
213	Talladega Nights: The Ballad of Ricky Bobby	March 2, 2022
214	BONUS: Batman On Film	March 8, 2022
215	Boogie Nights	March 9, 2022
216	The Piano	March 16, 2022
217	Best of 2021/Oscars Preview	March 23, 2022
218	The Green Knight	March 30, 2022
219	Monty Python and the Holy Grail	April 7, 2022
220	Shrek	April 14, 2022
221	Conan the Barbarian	April 21, 2022
222	Gauging Nicolas Cage (with Keith Phipps)	April 24, 2022
223	Adaptation	April 27, 2022
224	Akira	May 5, 2022
225	Wallace & Gromit: The Curse of the Were-Rabbit	May 12, 2022
226	Porco Rosso	May 19, 2022
227	Top Gun	May 26, 2022
228	Spider-Man: Into the Spider-Verse	June 2, 2022
229	BONUS: Top Gun: Maverick, Chip 'N Dale, and Doctor Strange 2	June 7, 2022
230	Superman	June 9, 2022
231	RRR	June 16, 2022
232	Supercop	June 23, 2022
233	Paddington 2	June 30, 2022
234	Blade	July 7, 2022
235	RoboCop	July 14, 2022
236	Top 3: Patton Oswalt & Meredith Salenger	July 21, 2022
237	Starship Troopers	July 28, 2022
238	The Three Musketeers & The Four Musketeers (with Quentin Tarantino and Roger Avary)	August 4, 2022
239	Fatal Attraction	August 11, 2022
240	The Night of the Hunter	August 18, 2022
241	Training Day	August 25, 2022
242	Top 3: Scott Aukerman & Shaun Diston	August 26, 2022
243	White Heat	September 1, 2022
244	Heat	September 8, 2022
245	The Dark Knight	September 15, 2022
246	Season 3 Finale	September 22, 2022
	Season 4	
247	Bonus: Summer Movie Wrapup	September 23, 2022
248	Midsommar	September 29, 2022
249	Hellraiser	October 6, 2022
250	Jennifer's Body	October 13, 2022
251	Halloween	October 20, 2022
252	Ringu	October 27, 2022
253	Goldfinger	November 3, 2022
254	Austin Powers: International Man of Mystery	November 10, 2022
255	Casino Royale	November 17, 2022
256	Planes, Trains and Automobiles	November 24, 2022
257	Thelma & Louise	December 1, 2022
258	Bonus: The 2022 Sight & Sound 100	December 7, 2022
259	Black Swan	December 8, 2022
260	Avatar	December 15, 2022
261	Die Hard	December 22, 2022
262	Jeanne Dielman, 23 quai du Commerce, 1080 Bruxelles	January 12, 2023
263	Blue Velvet	January 19, 2023
264	Star Wars: The Last Jedi	January 26, 2023
265	Bonus: 2023 Oscar Nominations	January 27, 2023
266	Crash	February 2, 2023
267	The Notebook	February 9, 2023
268	Top 3: Smriti Mundhra	February 14, 2023
269	Magic Mike	February 16, 2023
270	Top 3: Chapo Trap House	February 23, 2023
271	Hollywood Shuffle	March 2, 2023
272	Best of 2022 & Oscars Preview	March 9, 2023
273	Creed	March 16, 2023
274	Bonus Reel: Creed III, Magic Mike's Last Dance, and Scream VI	March 17, 2023
275	John Wick	March 23, 2023
276	In Bruges	March 30, 2023
277	Top 3: Bruce Campbell	April 4, 2023
278	El Mariachi	April 6, 2023
279	Evil Dead II	April 13, 2023
280	Top 3: Karina Longworth	April 20, 2023
281	What We Do in the Shadows	April 27, 2023
282	Young Frankenstein	May 4, 2023
283	Bonus: Sex Scenes In Film (with Dan Savage)	May 9, 2023
284	Blazing Saddles	May 11, 2023
285	Willy Wonka & the Chocolate Factory	May 18, 2023
286	The Little Mermaid	May 25, 2023
287	Top 3: Adam McKay	June 1, 2023
288	Labyrinth	June 8, 2023
289	Inside Out	June 15, 2023
290	Talking Trek (with Tawny Newsome & Paul F. Tompkins)	June 22, 2023
291	Indiana Jones and the Temple of Doom	June 29, 2023
292	Who Framed Roger Rabbit	July 6, 2023
293	Hot Fuzz	July 13, 2023
294	There Will Be Blood	July 20, 2023
295	Children of Men	July 27, 2023
296	The Listener's Choice Winner Revealed	August 3, 2023
297	Pee-wee's Big Adventure	August 10, 2023
298	Barbie & Oppenheimer (with Jamie Loftus)	August 17, 2023
299	Legally Blonde	August 24, 2023
300	Ranking the Mission: Impossible Films (with Light the Fuse)	August 31, 2023
301	American Psycho	September 7, 2023
302	Bullitt	September 14, 2023
303	The Karate Kid	September 21, 2023
304	Imitation of Life	September 28, 2023
305	Saw	October 5, 2023
306	Hairspray	October 12, 2023
307	The Wolf of Wall Street	October 19, 2023
308	The Rocky Horror Picture Show	October 26, 2023
309	Election	November 2, 2023
310	Fight Club	November 9, 2023
311	The Hunger Games	November 16, 2023
312	Ferris Bueller's Day Off	November 23, 2023
313	Concert Films	November 30, 2023
314	Scott Pilgrim vs. the World	December 7, 2023
315	The Emperor's New Groove	December 14, 2023
316	Edward Scissorhands	December 21, 2023
316	2023 Holiday Party	December 28, 2023
317	Space Finalists: Season 4	January 4, 2024
	Season 5	
318	Terminator 2: Judgment Day	January 11, 2024
319	Wayne's World	January 19, 2024
320	Out of Sight	January 25, 2024
321	Jackie Brown	February 1, 2024
322	Amadeus	February 8, 2024
323	American Beauty	February 15, 2024
324	The Sting	February 22, 2024
325	Dune (2021)	February 29, 2024
326	2024 Oscars Special	March 7, 2024
327	The Martian	March 14, 2024
328	Moon	March 21, 2024
329	Jesus Christ Superstar	March 28, 2024
330	Moonstruck w/ David Sims	April 4, 2024
331	Lost in Translation w/ Rico Gagliano	April 11, 2024
332	Her	April 18, 2024
333	Call Me by Your Name	April 25, 2024
334	Point Break	May 2, 2024
335	Carrie (1976)	May 9, 2024
336	The Goonies	May 16, 2024
337	Mad Max	May 23, 2024
338	The Adventures of Priscilla, Queen of the Desert (w/ Jamie Loftus)	June 6, 2024
339	Sweet Smell of Success (w/ Sean Fennessey)	June 13, 2024
340	Movie Round Up	June 20, 2024
341	Dune: Part Two	June 27, 2024
342	Independence Day	July 4, 2024
343	Godzilla Minus One	July 11, 2024
344	Twister (1996)	July 18, 2024
345	Edge of Tomorrow	July 25, 2024
346	This Is the End	August 1, 2024
347	Dawn of the Planet of the Apes	August 8, 2024
348	Airplane!	August 15, 2024
349	Armageddon	August 22, 2024
350	Deadpool & Wolverine, It Ends with Us, Trap	August 29, 2024
351	Shaun of the Dead	September 5, 2024
352	Beetlejuice	September 12, 2024
353	Batman Returns	September 19, 2024
354	Office Space	September 26, 2024
355	The Jerk	October 3, 2024
356	Folie à Deux: Taxi Driver & Joker	October 10, 2024
357	2024 Horror Movie Roundup	October 24, 2024
358	Seven	October 31, 2024
359	Heathers	November 14, 2024
360	Gladiator	November 21, 2024
361	The Big Lebowski	December 5, 2024
362	Magnolia	December 12, 2024
363	Eyes Wide Shut	December 19, 2024
	Season 6	
364	Interstellar	January 16, 2025
365	The Social Network	January 23, 2025
366	WALL-E	January 30, 2025
367	Captain Condor (Captain America: The Winter Soldier & Three Days of the Condor)	February 6, 2025
368	10 Things I Hate About You	February 13, 2025
369	Mulholland Drive	February 20, 2025
370	2025 Oscars Special	February 27, 2025
371	Anora	March 6, 2025
372	Movie Madness: 2005	March 13, 2025
373	The 40-Year Old Virgin	March 20, 2025
374	Pretty Woman	March 27, 2025
375	Being John Malkovich	April 3, 2025
376	Crouching Tiger, Hidden Dragon	April 10, 2025
377	Life of Brian	April 17, 2025
378	Trainspotting	April 24, 2025
379	No Spoilers: Sinners and Minecraft	April 29, 2025
380	The Empire Strikes Back	May 1, 2025
381	The Big Sleep	May 8, 2025
382	Basic Instinct	May 15, 2025
383	Wet Hot American Summer	May 22, 2025
384	John Wick: Chapter 4	May 29, 2025
385	But I'm a Cheerleader	June 5, 2025
386	Tommy Boy	June 12, 2025
387	28 Days Later	June 19, 2025
388	Speed Racer	June 26, 2025
389	NYT Top 100 Films	July 1, 2025
390	Air Force One	July 3, 2025
391	Superman Revisited	July 10, 2025
392	Waterworld	July 17, 2025
393	Borat	July 24, 2025
394	The Naked Gun	July 31, 2025
395	Summer Movie Recap 2025	August 7, 2025
396	They Live	August 14, 2025
397	Donnie Darko	August 21, 2025
398	Memento	August 28, 2025
399	The Breakfast Club	September 4, 2025
400	Clue	September 11, 2025
401	Celebrating Robert Redford	September 17, 2025
402	Spinal Tap	September 18, 2025
403	Dog Day Afternoon	September 25, 2025
404	One Battle After Another	September 29, 2025
405	Minority Report	October 2, 2025
406	Dead Poets Society	October 9, 2025
407	Remembering Diane Keaton	October 14, 2025
408	Pan's Labyrinth	October 16, 2025
409	Misery	October 23, 2025
410	The Conjuring	October 30, 2025
411	Prey	November 6, 2025
412	The Wiz	November 20, 2025
413	Reel Confessions: Kareem Rahma	November 25, 2025
414	2025 Thanksgiving Special	November 27, 2025
415	Anchorman	December 4, 2025
416	Brick	December 11, 2025
417	Reel Confessions: Molly Lambert	December 16, 2025
418	Remembering Rob Reiner	December 17, 2025
419	The Muppet Christmas Carol	December 18, 2025
420	Top 100 Comedies of All Time	January 1, 2026
421	Kill Bill	January 8, 2026
422	Napoleon Dynamite	January 15, 2026
423	Reel Confessions: Sarah Marshall	January 19, 2026
424	Uncut Gems	January 22, 2026
425	Shakespeare in Love	January 29, 2026
426	Brazil	February 5, 2026
427	Before Sunrise	February 12, 2026
428	Reel Confessions: Nicole Byer	February 17, 2026
429	Reality Bites	February 19, 2026
430	Twilight	February 26, 2026
431	Harold and Maude	March 5, 2026
432	2026 Oscars Special	March 12, 2026
433	Reel Confessions: Chris Ryan	March 17, 2026
434	Sinners	March 19, 2026
435b	Project Hail Mary	March 23, 2026
435	Arrival	March 26, 2026
436	Team America: World Police	April 2, 2026
437	The Truman Show	April 9, 2026
438	Total Recall	April 16, 2026
439	Reel Confessions: Mike Mitchell	April 21, 2026
440	The Devil Wears Prada	April 23, 2026
441	Jerry Maguire	April 30, 2026
442	The Secret Life of Walter Mitty	May 7, 2026
443	Summer Movie Preview 2026	May 14, 2026
444	Reel Confessions: Lauren Lapkus	May 19, 2026
445	Top Secret! (with Ed Helms)	May 21, 2026
446	The Baby-Sitters Club (with Rob Anderson)	May 28, 2026
447	Josie and the Pussycats (with Joanna Robinson)	June 4, 2026
448	Die Hard 2 (with Jorma Taccone)	June 11, 2026
449	Close Encounters of the Third Kind	June 18, 2026
450	Nope	June 26, 2026
451	Gremlins	July 2, 2026
452	The Muppet Movie (with BenDavid Grabinski)	July 9, 2026
453	Superbad	July 16, 2026
454	An American Tail	July 23, 2026
455	The Odyssey (with Lucas Matthew Herchenroeder)	July 25, 2026
456	Drive	July 30, 2026
457	Reel Confessions: David Wain	August 7, 2026
458	O Brother, Where Art Thou?	August 13, 2026
459	Reel Confessions: Josh Greenbaum	August 20, 2026
450	Interview with the Vampire	August 27, 2026
451	Hudson Hawk (with David Hughes)	September 3, 2026
452	Summer Movie Recap 2026	September 10, 2026
453	Beyond the Valley of the Dolls (with Julie Klausner)	September 17, 2026
454	Almost Famous (with Alan Sepinwall)	September 24, 2026
455	Salt (with Ira Madison III)	October 1, 2026
456	Hereditary (with David Ehrlich)	October 8, 2026
457	Spirited Away	October 15, 2026
458	Fast Five	October 22, 2026
459	The Witch	October 29, 2026
460	In Bruges	November 9, 2026
461	There's Something About Mary	November 12, 2026
462	You Can See Everything	November 19, 2026

== The API List ==
At the conclusion of Season 1, the hosts eliminated 60 movies from the AFI list and kept 40, publishing these selections as the core of their own "API" list (the "Amy and Paul Institute"), with the goal of again expanding the new list to 100 films, this time with an eye to gathering a more diverse representation of film creators and subjects than the AFI list offers. In the following seasons, additional films have been viewed and discussed, and added to the list. The hosts maintain that the collection, when complete, will be "shot into space" so that humanity's artistic endeavors can be shared with alien civilizations.

The API list currently includes 76 films and 2 tentative additions; 40 of which were retained from the AFI list in the final episode of Season 1, 18 of which were added in the final episode of Season 2, 13 of which were added in the final episode of Season 3, replacing 3 previously added films, 2 of which were added in the Listener's Choice episode mid-season 4, replacing 1 previously added film, and 7 of which were added in the final episode of Season 4.

Notably, the hosts have attempted to include no more than one film by any particular director, but due to the variety and quality of their work three directors are currently featured twice: Alfred Hitchcock, Stanley Kubrick, and Billy Wilder.

=== The API List ===
Position	Title	Season Added	Notes
1	Citizen Kane	1	
2	The Wizard of Oz	1	
3	Casablanca	1	
4	Modern Times	1	
5	2001: A Space Odyssey	1	
6	Singin' in the Rain	1	
7	Do the Right Thing	1	
8	The Godfather	1	Included as a trilogy
9	Sunrise: A Song of Two Humans	1	
10	All About Eve	1	
11	It's a Wonderful Life	1	
12	Lawrence of Arabia	1	
13	The Apartment	1	
14	Taxi Driver	1	
15	Rear Window	1	
16	Titanic	1	
17	The Treasure of the Sierra Madre	1	
18	Who's Afraid of Virginia Woolf?	1	
19	Duck Soup	1	
20	Pulp Fiction	1	
21	E.T. The Extra Terrestrial	1	May be replaced pending review of additional Steven Spielberg films
22	12 Angry Men	1	
23	Star Wars	1	Included as a trilogy
24	Annie Hall	1	
25	The Best Years of Our Lives	1	
26	Sullivan's Travels	1	
27	The Silence of the Lambs	1	
28	A Streetcar Named Desire	1	
29	Bonnie and Clyde	1	
30	Cabaret	1	
31	King Kong	1	
32	The Last Picture Show	1	
33	Intolerance	1	
34	Dr. Strangelove	1	May be replaced pending review of additional Stanley Kubrick films
35	Vertigo	1	May be replaced pending review of additional Alfred Hitchcock films
36	The Lord of the Rings	1	Included as a trilogy
37	Double Indemnity	1	May be replaced pending review of additional Film Noir films
38	Nashville	1	May be replaced pending review of additional Robert Altman films
39	To Kill a Mockingbird	1	
40	The General	1	Possibly replaced by the Jackass Films in Season 3 Finale, with a plan to watch more Buster Keaton and stunt-heavy films
	Back to the Future	2	Replaced by Who Framed Roger Rabbit in Episode 296, Listener's Choice Winner Revealed
41	Night of the Living Dead	2	
42	The Princess Bride	2	
43	Fast Times at Ridgemont High	2	
44	Mad Max: Fury Road	2	
45	Tokyo Story	2	
46	Hoop Dreams	2	Pending a discussion of whether documentaries belong on the list
47	A League of Their Own	2	
48	Bridesmaids	2	
49	A Trip to the Moon	2	
50	Groundhog Day	2	
51	Eternal Sunshine of the Spotless Mind	2	
52	Ganja and Hess	2	
	Raising Arizona	2	Replaced by Fargo in Season 3 Finale
	The Royal Tenenbaums	2	Replaced by The Grand Budapest Hotel in Season 3 Finale
	Inception	2	Replaced by The Dark Knight in Season 3 Finale
53	The Thing	2	May be replaced pending review of additional John Carpenter films
54	The 400 Blows	2	
55	The Matrix	3	
56	The Night of the Hunter	3	
57	Boogie Nights	3	May be replaced pending review of additional Paul Thomas Anderson films
58	The Dark Knight	3	Replaced Inception as a Christopher Nolan film on the API List
59	The Grand Budapest Hotel	3	Replaced The Royal Tenenbaums as a Wes Anderson film on the API List
60	Grease	3	May be replaced pending review of additional Musical films
61	RoboCop	3	Listener-voted for a Paul Verhoeven film on the API List, over Starship Troopers
62	Monty Python and the Holy Grail	3	May be replaced pending review of Monty Python's Life of Brian
63	The Texas Chain Saw Massacre	3	Listener-voted for a Horror film on the API List, over The Blair Witch Project
64	The Jackass Films	3	Included as a tetralogy
65	The Piano	3	
66	Fargo	3	Replaced Raising Arizona as a Coen Brothers film on the API List
67	Spider-Man: Into the Spider-Verse	3	May be replaced pending review of additional Animated, Superhero, and Spider-Man films
68	Who Framed Roger Rabbit	4	Replaced Back to the Future as a Robert Zemeckis film on the API List
69	Children of Men	4	
70	Die Hard	4	
71	Election	4	
72	Blazing Saddles or Young Frankenstein	4	Listener's Choice vote TBD for a Mel Brooks film on the API List
73	Edward Scissorhands or Pee-wee's Big Adventure	4	Listener's Choice vote TBD for a Tim Burton film on the API List
74	Blue Velvet	4	May be replaced pending review of additional David Lynch films
75	The Karate Kid	4	Unspooled crew talked about Karate Kid replacing Rocky, but Rocky was eliminated in Season 1
76	Thelma and Louise	4	
*	RRR	3	Tentative, too new and might remove once RRR fever dies down
*	Jeanne Dielman, 23 quai du Commerce, 1080 Bruxelles	4	Tentative, might remove once Jeanne Dielman fever dies down from 2022 Sight and Sound poll

== Spinoffs ==
=== Screen Test ===
Screen Test is an Unspooled film-themed game show hosted by Paul Scheer and Amy Nicholson. Contestants are tested on their "wits, bravado, and collaboration—the three necessities if you want to make it in Hollywood". The show launched in October 2020 on Stitcher, with some episodes airing live on Paul Scheer's Twitch Channel, FriendZone.

=== Spool Party ===
Spool Party is a live stream that focuses on fan favorite films with special guests. Episodes premiere live on YouTube. Shows have featured the films Big, Clue, and Clueless. One episode featured a House Party reunion with director Reginald Hudlin and Christopher "Play" Reid.
