= Drones (2013 film) =

- Directed by: Rick Rosenthal
- Written by: Matt Witten
- Produced by: Trent Broin; James C. Hart; M. Elizabeth Hughes; Nathan Kelly; Bert Kern; Nick Morton; Rick Rosenthal; Matt Witten
- Starring: Matt O'Leary; Eloise Mumford; Whip Hubley; William Russ
- Cinematography: Noah Rosenthal
- Edited by: Michelle M. Witten
- Music by: Cody Westheimer
- Production companies: Khaos Digital; Whitewater Films
- Distributed by: Phase 4 Films
- Release dates: October 19, 2013 (London Film Festival); June 27, 2014 (United States)
- Running time: 82 minutes
- Country: United States
- Language: English

Drones is a 2013 American thriller film directed by Rick Rosenthal and starring Eloise Mumford and Matt O'Leary.

== Plot ==
Two Airmen are tasked with deciding the fate of a terrorist with a single push of a button. As the action plays out in real time, their window to use a deadly military drone on the target slowly closes. With time running out, the Airmen begin to question what the real motives are behind the ordered lethal attack.

== Cast ==
- Eloise Mumford as Susan "Sue" Lawson
- Matt O'Leary as Jack Bowles
- Whip Hubley as Colonel Wallace
- William Russ as General Lawson
- Amir Khalighi as Mahmoud Khalil

== Reviews ==
On Rotten Tomatoes it got 33% rating based on reviews from 6 critics.

== See also ==
- List of films featuring drones
