= Little Big Awesome =

- Genre: Adventure; Comedy; Surreal comedy Slapstick
- Created by: Tomi Dieguez
- Developed by: Ben Gruber
- Directed by: Bryan Newton; Anthony Chun; Kim Arndt; Sung Jin Ahn; Angelo Hatgistavrou
- Voices of: Jessica McKenna; Fred Tatasciore
- Composer: Eban Schletter
- Country of origin: United States
- No. of episodes: 13 (26 segments)

Production
- Executive producers: Ben Gruber; Chris Prynoski; Shannon Prynoski
- Producer: Ben Kalina
- Editor: Felipe Salazar
- Running time: 24 minutes (12 minutes per segment)
- Production companies: Amazon Studios; Titmouse, Inc.

Original release
- Network: Amazon Video
- Release: April 26 – November 8, 2018

Little Big Awesome is an American animated television series created by Tomi Dieguez and developed for Amazon by Ben Gruber, in 2016. The series centers on characters Gluko, a shapeshifting pink bouncy jelly blob, and Lennon, Gluko’s beanie-toting best friend. The series incorporates various forms of mixed media, including puppets, 2D animation, and live-action, all against an animated backdrop. It is based on the 2010 Argentinian pilot Gluko and Lennon.

== Cast ==
- Fred Tatasciore as Gluko, Kitty Num-Nums, additional characters
- Jessica McKenna as Lennon (TV series), additional characters
- James Arnold Taylor as Lennon (pilot)
- Alex Jayne Go as Little Bubble
- Dana Snyder as Grandma, additional characters
- Roger L. Jackson as Mr. Sprinkles, additional characters
- Brendon Small as Pointy Things
- Jon Luke Thomas as Mayor, Leon, additional characters
- Jeff Galfer as additional characters
- Lonny Ross as Cricket, additional characters
- Sean Schemmel as additional characters
- Betsy Sodaro as Puddin Peggy, additional characters
- "Weird Al" Yankovic as Mr. Sun (live-action)
- Kat Palardy as Ho Cho Jo, additional characters
- Lennon Parham as Claude, additional characters
- Ennis Esmer as Stuhven, additional characters
- Aimee Mann as The Moon (live-action)
- Mike Mitchell as Gluko's Bed, Lyle
- Kate Micucci as Geremy, Hair Lady
- Dave Franco as Dave
- Yuri Lowenthal as Mord and Gord
- JB Blanc as Derby, Guy with Slide Projector Head, additional characters
- Cissy Jones as Frescha, Hot Chocolate, additional characters
- Richard Steven Horvitz as additional characters
- Helen Slayton-Hughes as Penelope Pitt-Plebop III, additional characters
- Nicole Byer as Puppy Num-Nums, Ho Cho Flo
- Derek Stephen Prince as Kunu, additional characters
- June Diane Raphael as Sheena
- Paul Scheer as Raymond the Cloud (live-action)
- Ben Gruber as Biff
- Michael Bolton as himself (live-action)

== Episodes ==
No. overall	Part no.	Title	Directed by	Written by	Original release date
Part 1
1a	1a	"City Day"	Bryan Newton	Dan Schofield	April 26, 2018
Gluko and Lennon love Townopolis so much they make a commercial about it. The ad attracts huge crowds that clog the town, forcing them to make more ads to try to deter the visitors.
1b	1b	"Let's Get to That Thing!"	Anthony Chun	Amalia Levari & Ben Gruber	April 26, 2018
It's the last day to pet the softest animal at the petting zoo. The boys must get to the zoo before it closes, but keep running into friends who need their help.
2a	2a	"Sorry Mr. Sun"	Kim Arndt	Dani Michaeli	April 26, 2018
Lennon offends the sun, which causes a blackout in Townopolis. Both Gluko and Lennon must work on their apologies to save the town and soothe their consciences.
2b	2b	"What's the Trouble Bubble"	Sung Jin Ahn	Ben Gruber	June 17, 2016 (original version); April 26, 2018 (revised version)
Gluko and Lennon must get Little Bubble back home to Bubble Land, while making it back in time with Kitty Num Nums to stop a group of adorable, yet naughty kittens from messing up Grandma's house.
3a	3a	"Bed Follows"	Bryan Newton	Andy Goodman	April 26, 2018
Gluko decides to avoid making his bed in favor of doing other fun things with Lennon. It's smooth sailing until Gluko's bed chases the boys to Freedomto - a town where everything is only halfway done.
3b	3b	"Gotta Get a Gimmick"	Kim Arndt	Dani Michaeli	April 26, 2018
When Gluko and Lennon meet a guy with a super sweet gimmick, they decide to adopt their own gimmicks in order to fit in with the cool crowd.
4a	4a	"Space Kittens for Now"	Mark Brooks	Ben Gruber	April 26, 2018
After learning his fellow cats are aliens, Mr. Sprinkles decides to travel with them to their home planet. Gluko and Lennon try to get him to the kitten spaceship before blast off.
4b	4b	"Blupo and Glendon"	Kim Arndt	Kaz	April 26, 2018
Gluko and Lennon get into a fight and separate. Realizing they can't function without one another, they secretly take on new personas so they can continue hanging out.
5a	5a	"Living the Dream"	Anthony Chun	Adeline Colangelo	April 26, 2018
In a misguided attempt to do the right thing, Gluko and Lennon help Geremy follow his dreams.
5b	5b	"Oh No, Ho Cho Jo!"	Anthony Chun	Kevin Kramer	April 26, 2018
Gluko and Lennon offer to watch Ho Cho Jo's shop while she runs an errand, but struggle with the pressure of keeping all customers happy.
6a	6a	"Puppy Shower"	Angelo Hatgistavrou	Adeline Colangelo	April 26, 2018
The citizens of Townopolis gather to observe the highly anticipated Centennial Puppy Shower. When the puppies don't show up, Gluko and Lennon join expert Penelop Pitt-Plebop to find the legendary puppies.
6b	6b	"Claude the Buff Hamster"	Anthony Chun	Kevin Kramer	April 26, 2018
After Gluko and Lennon make the world's heaviest pizza, they consult fitness guru Claude the Buff Hamster to get in shape so that they can lift a slice.
Part 2
7a	1a	"No Throwing Disc Left Behind"	Bryan Newton	Ben Gruber	November 8, 2018
When Gluko and Lennon accidentally throw their friend Sheena into the scariest place ever, Gluko encourages Lennon to face his fears in order to save her.
7b	1b	"Happy Birthday, Here's a Goat!"	Kim Arndt	Jillian Goldfluss	November 8, 2018
Gluko gets a goat for his Steenth Birthday, and must learn to care for it, in order to receive the Great Prize. When Gluko neglects the goat, Lennon secretly steps in to help.
8a	2a	"Snow Day"	Angelo Hatgistavrou	Julia Prescott	November 8, 2018
Gluko and Lennon offer to shovel Townopolis after a massive snowstorm, but are frozen solid before they can finish. They emerge from the ice in a future where high-waisted pants have taken over, and must find a way to go back in time to prevent the pants' oppressive reign.
8b	2b	"Rootin' for Change"	Anthony Chun	Kevin Kramer	November 8, 2018
While Gluko preps for his pickling license exam, Lennon struggles with a changing friend.
9a	3a	"No Sleep til 8 O'clock"	Bryan Newton	Jeff Trammell	November 8, 2018
After Gluko stays up all night to binge-watch his favorite TV show, Lennon is determined to get back on the same sleep schedule so they can hang out again.
9b	3b	"Gluko's Jelly Jam"	Kim Arndt	Kaz	November 8, 2018
Lennon brings Gluko to Jellyopolis, so he can refill his jelly. When they arrive, Lennon discovers that Jelly Giants are afraid of solids, and must conceal his identity in order to help.
10a	4a	"Return of the Murple's"	Angelo Hatgistavrou	Andy Goodman	November 8, 2018
When Gluko and Lennon's annoying new neighbors turn out to be Lennon's rival from Mashball Camp, Lennon must confront his past and beat his old nemesis at a sport he swore he'd never play again.
10b	4b	"Lyle in Charge"	Anthony Chun	Dani Michaeli	November 8, 2018
Stuhven leaves after accusing Lennon of taking him for granted. Now Lennon must find a replacement who can learn how to navigate the labyrinth inside Lennon's hat.
11a	5a	"The Great Tofu Drive"	Kim Arndt	Kevin Kramer	November 8, 2018
Gluko, Lennon, Ho Cho Jo, and Frescha are charged with getting a herd of tofu blocks to pasture before a big storm hits.
11b	5b	"The Big Jump"	Bryan Newton	Katie Mattila	November 8, 2018
Gluko teaches a reluctant Lennon how to cloud jump. Their fun is short lived as a mean dolphin named Big Nimbus mocks Lennon.
12a	6a	"Cosmic Communications"	Anthony Chun	Jeff Trammell	November 8, 2018
Gluko and Lennon try to help Mr. Sun and the Moon catch up in-person by covering their shifts in the sky. Unable to handle being separated, Gluko and Lennon inadvertently unleash a wave of chaos.
12b	6b	"A Bad Case of the Sherris"	Angelo Hatgistavrou	Kevin Kramer	November 8, 2018
Gluko and Lennon are quarantined inside due to an annoying sentient sickness, and must find a way to get through the next 24 hours without losing their minds.
13a	7a	"Friendiversary"	Bryan Newton	Adeline Colangelo	November 8, 2018
On the occasion of their 300th Friendiversary, Gluko and Lennon recount how they first met.
13b	7b	"Flower Power"	Kim Arndt	Ben Gruber	November 8, 2018
When Gluko and Lennon accidentally drive all the flowers out of town, they ask all of Townopolis to help bring them back.

== Awards and nominations ==
Year	Award	Category	Nominee	Result	Ref
2019	Annie Awards	Best Animated Television/Broadcast Production For Children	For episode Puppy Shower	Nominated	
2019	Daytime Emmy Awards	Outstanding Main Title and Graphic Design for an Animated Program		Nominated	
