= Standing Up, Falling Down =

2019 film by Matt Ratner

- Theatrical release poster
- Directed by: Matt Ratner
- Screenplay by: Peter Hoare
- Produced by: Chris Mangano; Matt Ratner; Rick Rosenthal; John Hermann; Gabrielle Nadig
- Starring: Billy Crystal; Ben Schwartz; Eloise Mumford
- Cinematography: Noah M. Rosenthal
- Edited by: Shayar Bhansali
- Production companies: Tilted Windmill Productions; Mangano Movies & Media; Whitewater Films; Face Productions
- Distributed by: Shout! Studios
- Release dates: April 25, 2019 (Tribeca); February 21, 2020 (United States)
- Running time: 91 minutes
- Language: English

Standing Up, Falling Down is a comedy drama film directed by Matt Ratner and written by Peter Hoare. The film stars Billy Crystal, Ben Schwartz, and Eloise Mumford. It premiered at the 2019 Tribeca Film Festival and was released in theaters and on demand on February 21, 2020.

== Premise ==
When a stand-up comedian is forced to move back to Long Island, he forms an unlikely friendship with an alcoholic dermatologist.

== Cast ==
- Billy Crystal as Marty
- Ben Schwartz as Scott
- Eloise Mumford as Becky
- Nate Corddry as Adam
- Grace Gummer as Megan
- John Behlmann as Owen
- Jill Hennessy as Vanessa
- David Castañeda as Ruis
- Caitlin McGee as Taylor
- Debra Monk as Jeanie Rollins
- Kevin Dunn as Gary Rollins

== Production ==
Standing Up, Falling Down was filmed in Long Beach, New York.

== Reception ==
On Rotten Tomatoes, the film holds an approval rating of 87% based on 60 reviews, with an average rating of 6.9/10. The website's critics consensus reads: "A familiar story entertainingly told, Standing Up, Falling Down is elevated by the warm chemistry between Billy Crystal and Ben Schwartz." On Metacritic the film has a weighted average score of 70 out of 100, based on 15 critics, indicating "generally favorable reviews".
