= Lone Star (TV series) =

- Also known as: Midland
- Genre: Drama
- Created by: Kyle Killen
- Starring: James Wolk; Adrianne Palicki; Bryce Johnson; David Keith; Eloise Mumford; Alexandra Doke; Jon Voight; Mark Deklin
- Composer: Danny Lux
- Country of origin: United States
- Original language: English
- No. of seasons: 1
- No. of episodes: 7

Production
- Executive producers: Amy Lippman; Chris Keyser; Kerry Kohansky Roberts; Kyle Killen; Paul Weitz
- Running time: 44 minutes
- Production companies: Keyser/Lippman Productions; Depth of Field Productions; 20th Century Fox Television

Original release
- Network: Fox
- Release: September 20 – September 27, 2010

Lone Star is an American drama television series which originally ran on Fox from September 20, 2010 to September 27, 2010.

== Premise ==
Robert Allen (James Wolk), a Texan con-man, leads a secret double life. As "Bob", he is married to Cat and living in Houston while working for his oil-tycoon father-in-law. Four hundred miles away in Midland, he is "Robert" in a second life with girlfriend Lindsey. As he schemes to take control of the oil business and finds himself torn between the love of two women, he must fight to keep his web of lies from falling apart.

== Development and production ==
In October 2009, Fox made a script-plus-penalty commitment with writer Kyle Killen. In mid-January 2010, Fox placed a cast-contingent pilot order under the working title Midland. Marc Webb was signed to direct the pilot episode. In early February, Amy Lippman, Chris Keyser, Kerry Kohansky Roberts, and Paul Weitz were all named as executive producers.

Casting announcements began in mid-February 2010. James Wolk was the first actor cast, in the lead role of Robert Allen. Next to sign on was Eloise Mumford, as Allen's girlfriend, Lindsay. In March, Adrianne Palicki and Bryce Johnson were cast as siblings Cat and Drew Thatcher. Cat is married to Robert. Jon Voight was cast as Clint Thatcher, and David Keith cast as John Allen, to portray the patriarchs of their respective families. Mark Deklin and Hannah Leigh rounded out the main cast at the end of March. Deklin filled the role of Trammell, an elder brother to Cat and Drew, while Leigh played Cat's daughter, Grace.

The pilot was filmed in Dallas, Texas, during the second half of March 2010. Fox green-lit the project to series in mid-May under the new name Lone Star. At the network's upfront presentation, Fox announced that the series would be part of the Fall 2010–11 television schedule, airing on Mondays at 9 pm. The series was filmed in Dallas and Fort Worth, Texas. Lippman and Keyser served as showrunners for the series, which began filming additional episodes in late July 2010.

In August 2010, it was reported that Andie MacDowell and Rosa Blasi would join the cast.

== Cast ==
=== Main ===
- James Wolk as Robert "Bob" Allen, a Texas con man married to Cat, the daughter of one of his marks in Houston, while simultaneously maintaining a relationship with Lindsay in Midland, Texas. He is in love with both women and begins to wish for a normal life.
- Adrianne Palicki as Cat Thatcher, Clint's daughter. At a young age, she married her boyfriend from high school and had a daughter with him. Their marriage ended in divorce. She later married Bob Allen, seeing in him the qualities that were lacking in her ex.
- Eloise Mumford as Lindsay, Robert Allen's unsuspecting girlfriend in Midland.
- David Keith as John Allen, Robert Allen's father. He raised his son to be a con man.
- Bryce Johnson as Drew Thatcher, the youngest of Clint's three children. He admires his brother-in-law.
- Mark Deklin as Trammell Thatcher, Clint's elder son and Blake's husband. Unlike his brother, he is suspicious of Bob's motives.
- Alexandra Doke as Grace Thatcher, Cat's daughter from her first marriage to Harrison.
- Jon Voight as Clint Thatcher, a Texas oil tycoon and father of Cat, Drew, and Trammell.

=== Recurring ===
- Andie MacDowell as Alex, an art appraiser. Clint becomes romantically interested in her; however, she proves more dangerous than anyone realizes.
- Rosa Blasi as Blake, the Lady Macbeth–esque trophy wife of Trammell.
- Chad Faust as Harrison, Cat's ex-husband and her high-school mistake. Roguish and unfaithful, he returns to Houston claiming he has changed.

== Reception ==
As of July 9, 2010, Metacritic reports that "if this isn't the best-received pilot of the season, it's close", with many early reviews suggesting that the show is "unlike anything else currently on TV." The A.V. Club graded its pilot an "A", calling it "the best network pilot of the year", and possibly the best since Friday Night Lights.

In spite of its widespread critical praise, the series premiere only drew 4.1 million viewers, and the future of the show seemed to hang in the balance. Series creator Kyle Killen had stated that:

For us to survive we're going to have to pull off a minor miracle. Statistically, new shows tend to lose viewers in their second week. We're aiming to gain them. In fact, screw it, let's just double our audience. The good news is, our audience was so small that if my Mom AND my Dad watch it we'll pretty much be there.

The show was canceled after its second episode, becoming the first official cancellation of the 2010–11 television season.

== Episodes ==
No.	Title	Directed by	Written by	Original release date	Prod. code	US viewers (millions)
1	"Pilot"	Marc Webb	Kyle Killen	September 20, 2010	1ASE79	4.06
2	"One in Every Family"	Peter Horton	Kyle Killen	September 27, 2010	1ASE01	3.2
3	"Unveiled"	Scott Winant	Chris Black	Unaired	1ASE02	N/A
4	"Small Time"	Steven Robman	Chris Levinson	Unaired	1ASE03	N/A
5	"Near Mrs."	Dan Lerner	Christopher Keyser & Amy Lippman	Unaired	1ASE04	N/A
6	"Reverse"	Billy Gierhart	Kyle Killen	Unaired	1ASE05	N/A
7	"Cost of Living"	Billy Gierhart	Kyle Killen	Unaired	1ASE06	N/A
