= Off Book: The Improvised Musical =

Musical theatre and comedy improv podcast

- Genre: Musical improvisation
- Language: English

Cast and voices
- Hosted by: Jessica McKenna; Zach Reino

Publication
- Original release: July 25, 2017
- Provider: Earwolf (2017–2021); Art19 Media (2021–2023)

Off Book: The Improvised Musical is a musical theatre podcast hosted by Jessica McKenna and Zach Reino. The show improvises a new musical every episode based on their guests' introduction. The show headlined at the 6th annual SteelStacks Improv Comedy Festival.

== Background ==
Zach Reino and Jessica McKenna met in 2011 at the Upright Citizens Brigade Theatre in Los Angeles, California and went on to create Off Book: The Improvised Musical. During each show, McKenna, Reino, and a guest improvise an entire narrative musical while Scott Passarella plays the piano. Each week, the musical is borne from the host's opening conversation with their guest, and the rest of the show works to tell a compelling musical, with included details from the starting conversation. Sometimes the guests do not have a background or experience with singing.

From May 29, 2018, the instrumental ensemble expanded from solely Passarella (piano) to Dana Wickens (drum kit) from episode "46. Princess LiveJournals (w/ Mano Agapion)" (May 29, 2018) and Brett Morris (bass guitar) from episode "64. Law & Order: Restaurant Unit (w/ Scott Aukerman, Paul F. Tompkins, Lauren Lapkus)" (October 2, 2018) onwards. The trio are collectively known as the "Fam Band", and feature as both musicians and microphoned "guests" in later episodes where a guest was unavailable for the weekly episode, discussing in more regular podcast fashion, interspersed with songs inspired by their collective conversation. The podcast was produced by Earwolf, but in 2021 the show moved to Art19 Media.

== Live events ==
The show has been performed in front of live audiences on numerous occasions.

The show was first performed live at the Charlotte Martin Theatre in Seattle during Bumbershoot on September 1, 2018. It was later performed live on October 4, 2018 at the Dallas Comedy House in Deep Ellum, and the following day at Station Theatre's Trill Fest in Houston, Texas.

On January 25, 2019 in Bethlehem, Pennsylvania, the show headlined the 6th annual SteelStacks Improv Comedy Festival A live performance was held later in the year at the Kansas City Improv Festival on August 16, 2019. There was also a performance in 2019 at the London Podcast festival.

== Reception ==
Tom Rainey praised the live episode titled "Forecast: Puberty Live! (With Nicole Byer and John Gemberling)" in Vulture saying that "the charm, charisma, and serious improv skills on display helped blow the roof off". The podcast was included on IndieWire's list of best podcasts in 2018 and 2019.
