= Black Ninja =

Black Ninja may refer to:

== People ==
- Cocoa Samoa, (1945–2007), American Samoan professional wrestler who used the ring name "Black Ninja"
- Kazuo Sakurada, (1948–2020), Japanese professional wrestler who used the ring name "Black Ninja"
- Keiji Muto (born 1962), Japanese professional wrestler who used the ring name "Black Ninja"
- Tori (wrestler), (born 1964), American bodybuilder and wrestler who used the ring name "Black Ninja"

== Arts and entertainment ==
- The Black Ninja, a 2003 American martial arts film
- Black Ninjas, fictional characters in the video game Destroy All Humans! 2
- Cole (Ninjago), also known as the "Black Ninja", a fictional character in the animated television series Ninjago

== See also ==
- White Ninja (disambiguation)
