= Party Over Here =

American comedy television series

- Genre: Sketch comedy
- Created by: Paul Scheer; Andy Samberg; Akiva Schaffer; Jorma Taccone
- Starring: Nicole Byer; Jessica McKenna; Alison Rich
- Country of origin: United States
- Original language: English
- No. of seasons: 1
- No. of episodes: 10

Production
- Executive producers: Andy Samberg; Akiva Schaffer; Jorma Taccone; Billy Rosenberg; Paul Scheer
- Running time: 18-20 minutes
- Production companies: 2nd Man on the Moon; The Lonely Island; Kablamo!

Original release
- Network: Fox
- Release: March 12 – May 21, 2016

Party Over Here is an American sketch comedy television series created by Paul Scheer and The Lonely Island, who serve as executive producers. It premiered on Fox on March 12, 2016, and was cancelled after one season on August 9, 2016.

It was the first original live-action program carried in Saturday late night by Fox after the cancellation of The Wanda Sykes Show. As of 2026, it is the last late night show on Saturday late night on Fox, excluding the temporary FIFA World Cup on Fox After Hours with James Corden. This was also the second female-led sketch comedy show to be aired on Fox; the first was The Tracey Ullman Show in 1987.

== Cast ==
- Nicole Byer
- Jessica McKenna
- Alison Rich

=== Featured players ===
- Marques Ray
- Carl Tart

== Development and production ==
On December 3, 2014, it was announced that Paul Scheer and The Lonely Island created a new sketch series for Fox called Party Over Here as a part of The Lonely Island's overall development deal with the network. On February 4, 2016, Fox announced that the half-hour series would debut on Saturday, March 12, and that Scheer would serve as show runner and as one of the directors of the series. Nicole Byer, Jessica McKenna and Alison Rich were cast.

=== Crew ===
Writers

- Nick Wiger - Head writer
- Heather Anne Campbell
- Lauren McGuire
- Ryan Perez
- Yamara Taylor

Directors

- Danny Jelinek
- Rachel Goldenberg - Segment director
- Paul Scheer - Segment director

== Broadcast ==
In most markets the scheduling of the series at 11 p.m. ET/PT, 10 p.m. CT/MT means it would have, specifically by producer's preference, not have gone against Saturday Night Live (the other half-hour of Fox's late night timeslot would carry a repeat of Cooper Barrett's Guide to Surviving Life), with the members of The Lonely Island receiving the blessing of SNL creator Lorne Michaels to bring the show forward under that condition. However, in markets where the local Fox affiliate carries a late local newscast at 11 p.m ET./10 p.m. CT, the series was delayed to air within the first half-hour of SNL.

== Episodes ==
No.	Title	Original release date	Prod. code
1	"Suffragettes"	March 12, 2016	101
2	"The Low Loud Cheer"	March 19, 2016	102
3	"Saying Goodnight to the Frumpets"	March 26, 2016	103
4	"AlisONE"	April 2, 2016	104
5	"Party Favorites"	April 16, 2016	109
6	"Antelope"	April 23, 2016	105
7	"Aaron Peaches"	April 30, 2016	106
8	"Assassin Reunion"	May 7, 2016	107
9	"You're A Wizard, Alison"	May 14, 2016	108
10	"Party Favorites 2"	May 21, 2016	110
