= The River (American TV series) =

American television series

- Genre: Action; Adventure; Horror
- Created by: Oren Peli; Michael R. Perry
- Starring: Bruce Greenwood; Joe Anderson; Leslie Hope; Eloise Mumford; Paul Blackthorne; Thomas Kretschmann; Daniel Zacapa; Shaun Parkes; Paulina Gaitán
- Composer: Graeme Revell
- Country of origin: United States
- Original language: English
- No. of seasons: 1
- No. of episodes: 8

Production
- Executive producers: Oren Peli; Jason Blum; Steven Schneider; Darryl Frank; Justin Falvey; Zack Estrin; Michael Green; Steven Spielberg
- Producers: Samantha Thomas; Robert D. Simon; Jaume Collet-Serra; Ryan DeGard (assoc); Hilton H. Smith (co.)
- Production locations: Puerto Rico (pilot); Oahu, Hawaii
- Cinematography: John Leonetti
- Editors: Alan Cody; Tim Alverson
- Running time: 43 minutes
- Production companies: Haunted Movies; Amblin Television; ABC Studios; J.A. Green Construction Corp.

Original release
- Network: ABC
- Release: February 7 – March 20, 2012

The River is a 2012 American found-footage supernatural action horror television series that ran from February 7, 2012 to March 20, 2012, on ABC. Broadcast as a mid-season replacement, the first season has eight episodes.

On May 11, 2012, ABC canceled the series after one season. After that, Netflix was in talks with ABC Studios about possibly continuing the series on its video-on-demand digital distribution service, though they ultimately passed.

== Synopsis ==
Famed explorer Dr. Emmet Cole (Bruce Greenwood) went looking for "magic" deep in the uncharted Amazon basin and never returned. The shocking truth about his disappearance is out there, somewhere, just waiting to be discovered. To the millions of children who grew up watching his nature show, Dr. Cole was a hero. To his own son, Lincoln (Joe Anderson), he was more of an enigma. Now, six months after he vanished, Lincoln is finally ready to bury the past when Dr. Cole's emergency beacon suddenly goes off. At the urging of his mother, Tess (Leslie Hope), Lincoln reluctantly joins her on a search for his father. To fund the rescue, they agree to let Dr. Cole's cagey ex-producer, Clark (Paul Blackthorne), film the mission documentary-style. The mixed crew of old friends and new acquaintances includes the missing cameraman's daughter, Lena Landry (Eloise Mumford), ship's mechanic Emilio Valenzuela (Daniel Zacapa), and private security bodyguard Captain Kurt Brynildson (Thomas Kretschmann).

== Cast and characters ==
=== Main ===
- Bruce Greenwood as Dr. Emmet Cole, a famed explorer and TV personality
- Joe Anderson as Lincoln Cole, a medical student and Emmet's son
- Leslie Hope as Tess Cole, Emmet's wife and Lincoln's mother
- Eloise Mumford as Lena Landry, Lincoln's childhood friend and Russ' daughter
- Paul Blackthorne as Clark Quietly, Emmet's producer
- Thomas Kretschmann as Capt. Kurt Brynildson, a private security bodyguard hired to protect Clark's group
- Daniel Zacapa as Emilio Valenzuela, the ship's mechanic and Jahel's father
- Shaun Parkes as A.J. Poulain, Clark's lead cameraman
- Paulina Gaitán as Jahel Valenzuela, Emilio's daughter

=== Guest ===
- Scott Michael Foster as Jonas Beckett, the second cameraman of Emmet's expedition
- Katie Featherston as Rosetta "Rabbit" Fischer, a camera operator in Emmet's expedition
- Lee Tergesen as Russ Landry, Emmet's longtime lead cameraman and Lena's father
- Jeff Galfer as Sammy Kirsch, Clark's second cameraman
- Jose Pablo Cantillo as Manny Centeno, a camera operator in Emmet's expedition
- Don McManus as Patrick, the leader of crew trapped on a ghost ship
- Karen LeBlanc as Annabele, a crew member trapped on the ghost ship
- Walter Perez as Soup, a crew member trapped on the ghost ship
- Kelemete Misipeka as Malosi, a crew member trapped on the ghost ship
- Lili Bordán as Hanna, Kurt's fiancée

== Production ==
Oren Peli and Michael R. Perry created the series about a documentary crew searching the Amazon for a beloved scientist-explorer-television host. Peli told The Hollywood Reporter that producer Steven Schneider "became obsessed with this idea of nature run [amok] and animals taking over humans." Peli stated: "I started developing the idea of a missing documentary reporter who went to this weird place in the rainforest where strange things would happen". He added, "We were developing it as a low budget movie, but ... I had a meeting with Steven Spielberg". Spielberg suggested doing a television show with Peli. Perry added his thoughts, saying: "Why waste [the idea for The River] on a movie, when you can do a TV show where every season they go to a different place". Then, they pitched the whole pilot to Spielberg. In September 2010, ABC won a bidding war against NBC for the rights to the project. In February 2011, after a re-write by Michael Green, ABC green-lit the production of the pilot. In May 2011, ABC committed to produce eight episodes, announcing that the show would premiere in the 2011–12 mid-season.

The pilot episode was filmed in Puerto Rico and the next seven episodes were produced in Hawaii.

== Release ==
The River premiered in the U.S. and Canada (on CTV) on February 7, 2012. The series aired in South Africa on DStv on February 21, 2012. In India, the series started airing on STAR World on March 3, 2012.

In the United Kingdom, the series has been picked up by Syfy on October 9, 2012 after being premiered on iTunes on February 8, 2012.

On May 22, 2012, ABC and DreamWorks/Amblin released the first season of The River in DVD format on to the United States and its territories, Canada, and Bermuda. Entitled "The River – The Complete First Season", the package includes all eight episodes in their entirety and features deleted scenes and episode audio commentaries.

== Episodes ==
No.	Title	Directed by	Written by	Original release date	U.S. viewers (millions)
1	"Magus" (Part 1)	Jaume Collet-Serra	Story by : Oren Peli & Michael R. Perry; Teleplay by : Michael Green and Michael R. Perry	February 7, 2012	7.59
Six months ago, Emmet Cole, adventurer and host of The Undiscovered Country, disappeared while on an expedition deep in the uncharted waters of the Amazon River. The fruitless search and subsequent 'memorial service' left thousands of fans in shock at the loss of their icon. Now, his emergency beacon had been activated, and his wife Tess, who reluctantly faced reality, organizes a search party to find him. The team comprises her estranged son Lincoln, who was more than ready to leave the past behind; Emmet's long-time friend and Undiscovered Country producer Clark Quietly; Magus mechanic Emilio Valenzuela and his daughter Jahel; Lena Landry, daughter of cameraman Russ Landry who has disappeared along with Cole; and ex-forces Captain Kurt Bryndilson, who provides security for the expedition. What the team does not know is that this journey will take them to a place where magic comes alive and things are never what they seem. The paranormal entity they encountered in this episode is a corpo seco.
2	"Marbeley" (Part 2)	Jaume Collet-Serra	Michael Green & Zack Estrin	February 7, 2012	7.59
When Jahel becomes possessed by Emmet Cole's spirit, Tess becomes undeterred from her goal of finding clues to her husband's whereabouts. The team then discovers a tree draped in children's dolls, and an old legend reminds them that the tree of dolls is an offering site to "La Dejada, the abandoned one", as mentioned by Lena, in this case a spirit of a girl who drowned in the river. Tess was suddenly dragged away to drown and Lincoln has to find a way to appease the spirit.
3	"Los Ciegos"	Michael Katleman	Glen Morgan	February 14, 2012	4.96
When the Magus crew discover a clue that Dr Emmet Cole may have visited a nearby cave, they decide to investigate, hiking through the jungle to follow this most recent lead. They soon realize they have entered the territory of the Morcegos, a tribe of warriors known as "The Guardians of the Forest" who bear judgement on the crew of the Magus, whether they are worthy to pass through their lands or not. The team, with the exception of cave-phobic cameraman AJ Poulain, enter the cave, accidentally disturbing a colony of bats dwelling within. Later that night, they are visited by the stealthy Morcegos, who place markings around their tents and somehow infect the eyes of the team members who entered the cave with an unidentified toxin. One by one, they lose their sight. Now, camera operator AJ must face his fear and find a cure before the team succumbs to permanent blindness.
4	"A Better Man"	Dean White	Aron Eli Coleite	February 21, 2012	4.80
The Magus team encounters Jonas, one of Emmet's cameramen who had disappeared with him six months ago, and discover that he's been the victim of a mystical curse. Jahel, the daughter of the ship's mechanic is uneasy with Jonas' presence. A lot of times "El Colgado" appears on her tarot readings, the hanging man. Soon, this discovered curse becomes a matter of life and death, not just for Jonas, but for the rest of the crew as well. When the others plan to jettison Jonas and continue the mission, Lincoln must face this challenge and be the moral compass.
5	"Peaches"	Rob Bailey	Wendy Battles	February 28, 2012	4.04
The Magus finds itself stranded and in need of some parts, when another ship comes to their rescue. However, the new ship's crew of environmentalists are far more dangerous than they appear, despite seeming friendly. Lena and Jonas discover the other ship has Lena's father, missing cameraman Russ, chained in the hull of their ship. Once more, the Magus's crew is in danger.
6	"Doctor Emmet Cole"	Michelle MacLaren	Michael Green	March 6, 2012	4.21
After finding Emmet's camera bag during a trek to the Sahte Falls, the Magus crew examines the tapes and finds footage of Emmet alongside camera operators Manny Centeno and Rosetta "Rabbit" Fischer looking for "The Source"; a tribe living in the jungle who have powers to heal or achieve anything. As a mysterious demon follows them, killing Manny and causing Rabbit leave, Emmet is left by himself. In the jungle, he realises that he might have made a mistake coming out here. As he progresses through the jungle alone, hungry and weak, the mysterious demon follows him, and as it is about to take Emmet's life, tribesmen come and save him. They heal him, and take him to a research facility in the jungle, before hurrying off. People from the base see Emmet and rush towards him to help. The Magus crew realise that he is alive and trek the jungle to find the facility, only to discover it is abandoned.
7	"The Experiment"	Kenneth Fink	Soo Hugh	March 13, 2012	4.09
Beginning where the previous episode ends—Emmet Cole's last known location—the research facility, the Magus crew not only discovers that it is abandoned, but also that there has been illegal research and experiments occurring, with the inhabitants of the forest being used as test subjects. The research went wrong and turned the inhabitants and workers into cannibals who begin to stalk the crew. One of the researchers-turned-zombie is Hanna, Kurt's fiancée, and the reason for his secrecy is finally revealed. The crew finds Rabbit, who abandoned Cole some months prior to the episode, and also discover a room in the facility with an unconscious Emmet Cole concealed in a cocoon. They cut him out and travel back to the ship, only to be followed by the cannibals, which leads to Rabbit being killed by Hanna before Kurt is forced to put her down and Emmet Cole waking up.
8	"Row, Row, Row Your Boat"	Gary Fleder	Story by : Zack Estrin; Teleplay by : Aron Eli Coleite & Michael Green	March 20, 2012	3.99
After Lincoln is shot dead by a member of the Magus, Jahel disobeys her father and Emmet by calling upon the river's spirit for help. With the help of Tess, Jahel performs a ritual which brings Lincoln back to life. Lincoln tells the crew that Kurt shot him, when later it is revealed to be Jonas. With an evil spirit inside him, Lincoln kills Jonas. Clark discovers Jonas' body and the crew realize the truth about what is happening—the Boiuna's spirit is living inside Lincoln. Emmet asks Lena to help force the evil spirit out of his son and they perform an exorcism. When it does not work, Emmet asks Kurt to help, who tells him that he needs to talk to his son, not the spirit. Emmet does so, which results in the spirit leaving. The crew then tries to follow the map out of the Boiuna to a fishing village for supplies, but find that it is not there when they arrive. Clark sends up the heli-cam to inspect the surroundings. On a monitor, the crew sees that the river and terrain are changing, to which Lincoln explains that the Boiuna will not let them leave.

== Broadcast ==
The River premiered in the U.S. and Canada (on CTV) on February 7, 2012. The series aired in South Africa on DStv on February 21, 2012. In the United Kingdom the series was not initially picked up by a traditional broadcaster and instead premiered on iTunes on February 8, 2012. However, Syfy announced that it would air The River starting October 9, 2012 at 10pm.

== Critical reception ==
On review aggregator Rotten Tomatoes, the series has an overall approval rating of 63% based on 27 reviews, with an average rating of 6.4/10. The website's critical consensus reads: "Despite its gimmicky premise and occasionally silly storylines, The River is a moderately scary and clever supernatural thriller." The show holds a 65/100 on Metacritic, based on reviews from 29 critics, indicating "generally favorable reviews". Matt Roush of TV Guide called the show "a terrifying heart-stopper, a cleverly cinematic supernatural adventure that takes us on a wild ride into an exotic heart of darkness." USA Today's Robert Bianco stated: "There are moments when The River, with its curse-around-every-corner setup, threatens to topple over into farce. But a strong cast and that things-that-go-bump-in-the-night shooting style so far keep the show on course". However, Mike Hale of The New York Times rated the show poorly, saying: "The mixture of Lost storytelling and Paranormal Activity style is neither intriguing nor particularly scary, and it doesn't help that there's hardly a glimmer of humor".
