= Eloise Mumford =

American actress (born 1986 or 1987)

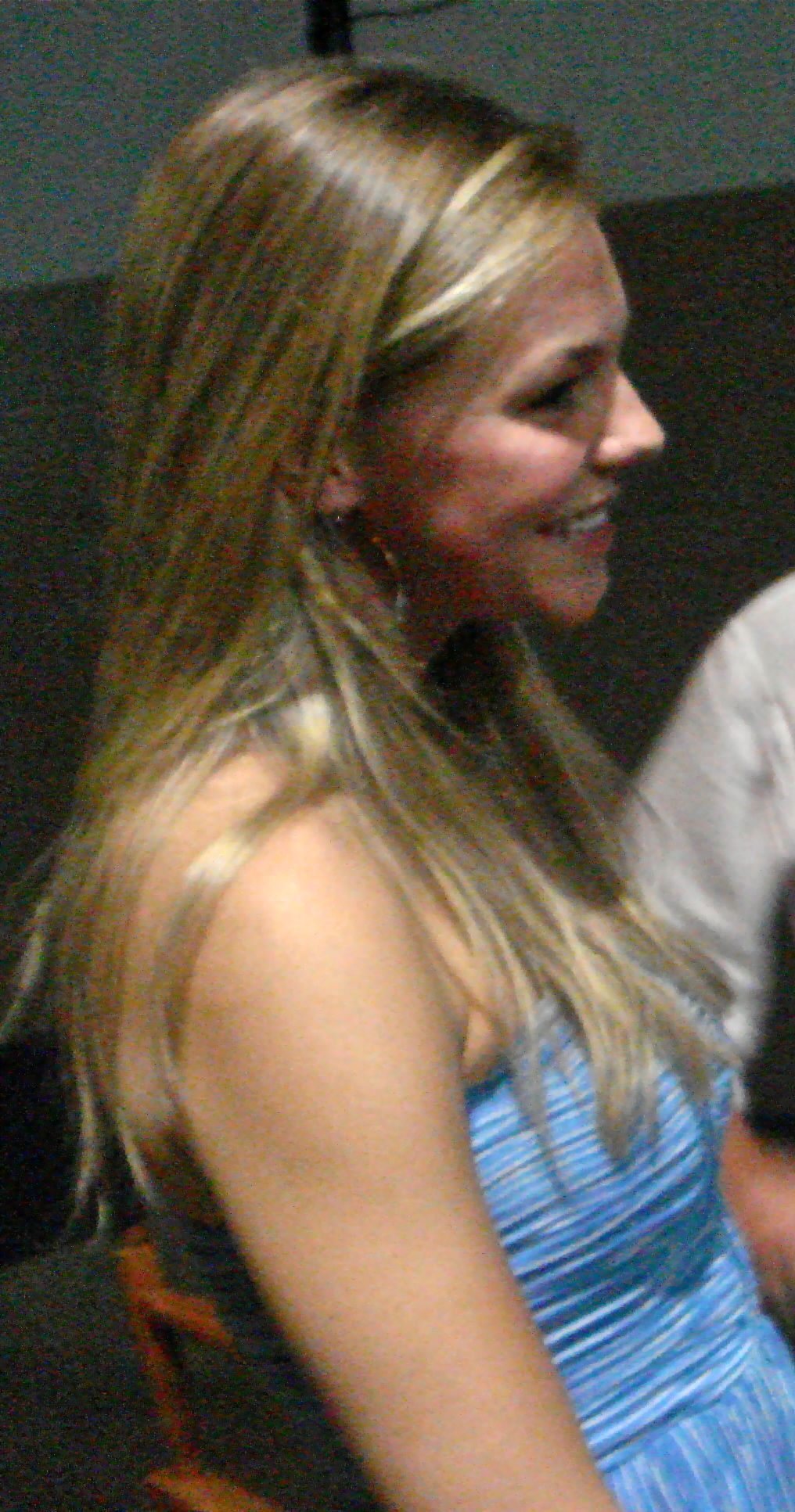
- Born: 1986 or 1987 (age 39–40); Olympia, Washington, U.S.
- Education: New York University (BA)
- Occupation: Actress
- Years active: 2008–present

Eloise Mumford (born 1986 or 1987) is an American actress known for her roles on the television series Lone Star, The River, The Right Stuff, and Cross. She appeared as Katherine "Kate" Kavanagh in the Fifty Shades of Grey film series.

== Early life and education ==
Mumford, the middle child of parents Tom Mumford and Nancy Smith, was born and raised in Olympia, Washington, where she was home-schooled through fifth grade. After homeschooling, she attended Nova Middle School. She later attended Annie Wright Schools in Tacoma, Washington and Capital High School in Olympia. She has an older sister, Anna, and a younger brother, Kai. Inspired at age seven by a local production of South Pacific, Mumford performed in high school plays and at Olympia's Capital Playhouse.

She graduated in 2009 from New York University's Tisch School of the Arts. She also is an alumna of the Atlantic Acting School. While in college, she starred with Jesse Eisenberg in director Maggie Kiley's well-received short film "Some Boys Don't Leave". She understudied Elisabeth Moss in the Broadway production of Speed the Plow.

== Career ==
Mumford starred as Lena Landry on the ABC paranormal series The River in 2012 and on the Fox series Lone Star in 2010, in which she was cast during her first pilot season after college. She was the female lead in the Blumhouse Productions feature Not Safe For Work for Universal Pictures, and the female lead in the indy Drones alongside Matt O'Leary, directed by Rick Rosenthal.

In February 2012, she was cast as the female lead in an ABC drama pilot titled Reckless. She played Anastasia Steele's roommate, Kate Kavanagh, in the Fifty Shades of Grey film (2015), and reprised the role in the sequels Fifty Shades Darker and Fifty Shades Freed.

She starred alongside Billy Crystal and Ben Schwartz in the indy Standing Up, Falling Down (2019). In 2020 she played Trudy Cooper, the female lead in the Disney+ streaming TV series The Right Stuff. In 2024 she appeared in eight episodes of Amazon Prime’s Cross as Shannon Whitmer, a woman abducted by a serial killer.

== Filmography ==
=== Television ===
Year	Title	Role	Notes
2008	Crash	Megan Emory	4 episodes
2009	Law & Order: Special Victims Unit	Vanessa	Episode: "Sugar"
2009	Mercy	Hannah	Episode: "Some of Us Have Been to the Desert"
2010	Lone Star	Lindsay Holloway	Main cast
2012	The River	Lena Landry	Main cast
2012	Christmas with Holly	Maggie	TV movie
2015	Just in Time for Christmas	Lindsay	TV movie
2017, 2019	Chicago Fire	Hope Jacquinot	Recurring role (seasons 6, 8)
2018	A Veteran's Christmas	Captain Grace Garland	TV movie
2020	The Right Stuff	Trudy Cooper	
2021	The Baker's Son	Annie McBride	TV movie
2021	One December Night	Quinn Allan	TV movie
2022	The Presence of Love	Joss	TV movie
2023	Sweeter Than Chocolate	Lucy Sweet	TV Movie
2024	Cross	Shannon Whitmer	Main cast
2025	Villa Amore	Liara Taylor	TV Movie

=== Film ===
Year	Title	Role	Notes
2009	Some Boys Don't Leave	The Girl	Short film
2012	So Undercover	Sasha Stolezinsky/ Suzy Walters	Direct-to-video
2013	Drones	Sue Lawson	
2014	Not Safe for Work	Anna Newton	
2014	In the Blood	Sandy Grant	
2015	The Night Is Young	Sid	
2015	Fifty Shades of Grey	Katherine "Kate" Kavanagh	
2017	Fifty Shades Darker	Katherine "Kate" Kavanagh	
2018	Fifty Shades Freed	Katherine "Kate" Kavanagh	
2019	Standing Up, Falling Down	Becky	
