= Alison Rich =

American actress, writer, and director

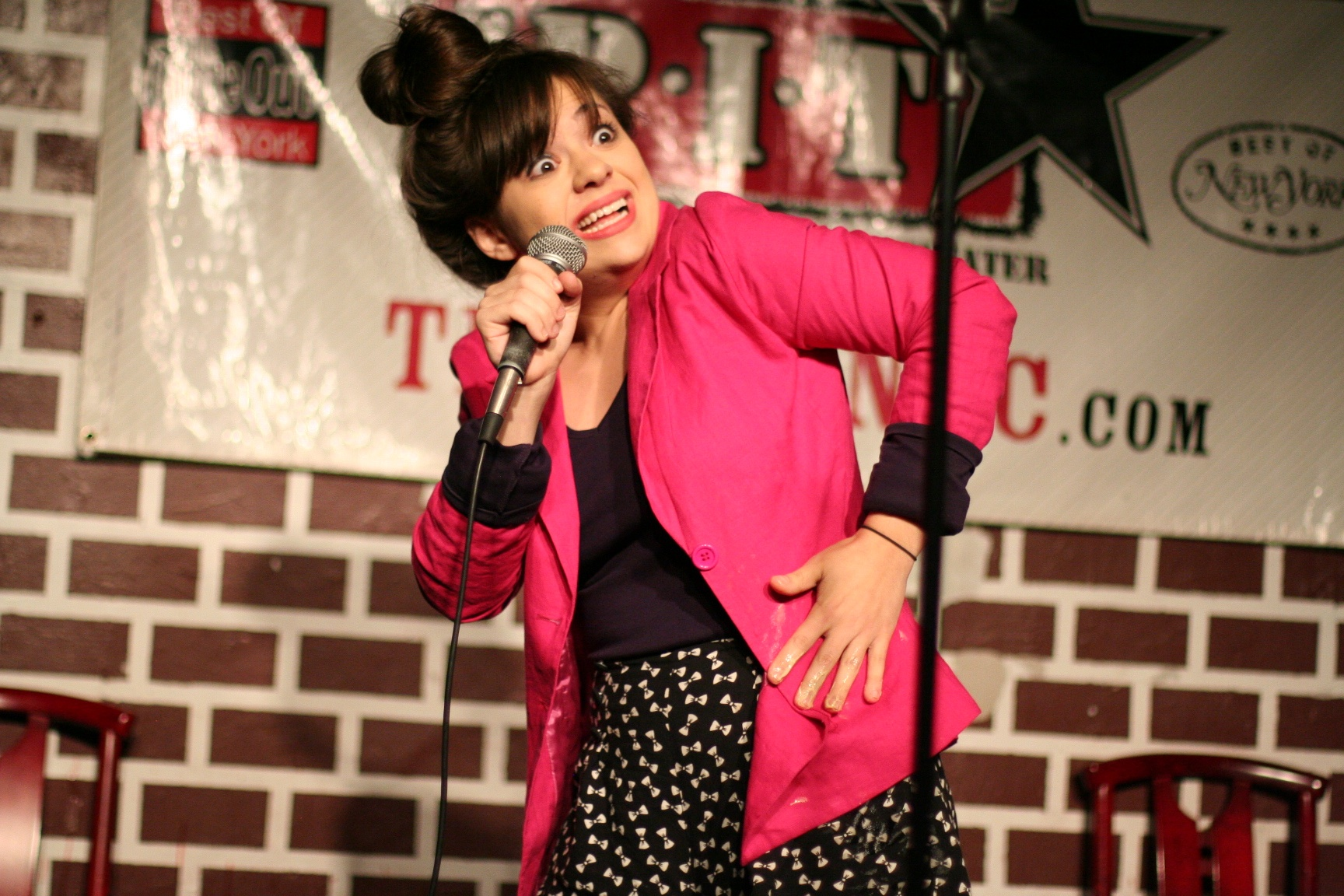
- Rich performing in 2011
- Education: Harvard University
- Occupations: Writer, actress, director
- Years active: 2010–present
- Known for: The Goldbergs, The Other Two

Alison Rich is an American actress, writer, and director. She is best known for her acting on The Goldbergs and The Other Two and for her short films that have been screened at the Sundance Film Festival and SXSW.

== Life and career ==
Rich was raised in Port Washington, Long Island, New York. She received her bachelor's degree from Harvard University.

Rich trained in improv and sketch comedy at UCB Theatre in New York. She joined the Saturday Night Live writing staff in 2014. She later wrote for Billy on the Street, and appeared on Best Week Ever, Late Night with Jimmy Fallon, Drunk History, Tuca & Bertie, Angie Tribeca, and 2 Broke Girls. Rich was a main cast member of the sketch comedy series Party Over Here (2016), and Rob Riggle's Ski Master Academy (2018). She was a series regular on Resident Advisors (2015) and a recurring character on The Other Two (2021). Rich has been a supporting cast member on The Goldbergs since 2017, where she was also a writer for several years.

Rich wrote and starred in her directorial debut short film, The Other Morgan, which premiered at SXSW in 2021. Her second short film, Training Wheels, premiered at the 2022 Sundance Film Festival. Her third short film, Pathological, premiered at the 2024 Sundance Film Festival.

== Filmography ==
=== Television ===
Year	Title	Role	Notes
2012	Incognito	Alison	Web series; also creator
2012–2015	CollegeHumor Originals	Various	Web series; also director
2013–2014	Fast Food Heights	Ginny	Main role
2015	Resident Advisors	Amy	Main role
2015	Life in Pieces	Kalliope	Episode: "Sleepy Email Brunch Tree"
2016	2 Broke Girls	Leslie	Episode: "And You Bet Your Ass"
2016	Angie Tribeca	Detective Smalls	Recurring role
2016	Adam Ruins Everything	Mr. Bitey	Episode: "Adam Ruins Animals"
2016	Comedy Bang! Bang!	Cracker Aukerman	Episode: "Ben Folds Wears a Black Button Down and Jeans"
2016	Party Over Here	Various	Main role
2017	The UCB Show	Dr. David Tennyson	Episode: "We Will Explore Distant Galaxies"; also writer
2017	Rhett and Link's Buddy System	Vanessa	Recurring role
2017–2023	The Goldbergs	Valley Erica	Recurring role; also writer
2018	Drunk History	Herself	Episode: "Drunk Mystery"
2018	An Emmy for Megan	Alison	Episode: "Rules"
2018	Ghost Story Club	Alex	Main role
2018	Rob Riggle's Ski Master Academy	Chandler	Main role
2021	Tuca & Bertie	Nighttime Friend (voice)	Episode: "Nighttime Friend"
2021-2023	The Other Two	Melanie	Recurring role

=== Film ===
Year	Title	Role	Notes
2016	Other People	Melanie	
2016	Popstar: Never Stop Never Stopping	Crazy Fan	
2021	The Mitchells vs. The Machines	Jill (Woman in pod) (voice)	
2021	The Other Morgan	Morgan 1	Short film; also writer and director
2022	Training Wheels	Enid	Short film; also writer and director
2024	Pathological	Juliet	Short film; also writer and director

== Awards and nominations ==
- 2013 – IFC Out of the Box Award, New York Television Festival (for Incognito)
- 2013 – Best Actress Award, Independent Pilot Competition, New York Television Festival (for Incognito)
- 2016 – Writers Guild of America Awards, Comedy/Variety Sketch Series, Nominee (for Saturday Night Live)
- 2021 – Grand Jury Award, SXSW Film Festival, Nominee (for The Other Morgan)
- 2022 – Short Film Grand Jury Prize, Sundance Film Festival, Nominee (for Training Wheels)
