= White Ninja (webcomic) =

Webcomic by Scott Bevan and Kent Earl

- Author(s): Scott Bevan and Kent Earle
- Website: White Ninja
- Current status/schedule: Active (as a webseries) Ended (as a webcomic) Every Monday, Wednesday, and Friday (Formerly)
- Genre: Surreal humour
- Preceded by

White Ninja is an animated webseries created by Scott Bevan and Kent Earle from Saskatoon, Saskatchewan, Canada. It was previously a webcomic that ran from 2002 to 2012 as part of the National Lampoon Humor Network. The comic was also part of Dayfree Press and ran exclusive strips on Cracked.com between August 2008 and April 2009. The comics were rebooted as a webseries, launched in 2015.

The White Ninja comic series had over 1,300 comics in the archive and over 2,000 fan-art submissions.

The comic went on hiatus after March 21, 2012. One new comic appeared on July 13, 2012, followed by another on August 14, though none have since followed.

A year later, on August 14, 2013, an announcement was posted on the White Ninja homepage stating that the series was "officially on hiatus" with an "official apology coming soon". It also stated, however, that the comic archive will remain open during the hiatus.

A year after that, in August 2014, the site officially went offline and replaced with a text saying "New comics coming soon". In September 2014, the URL redirected to another webcomic, Soopah, drawn by Tank T. Thomas.

In 2015, White Ninja was rebooted as an animated webseries, with original creator Bevan partnering with North of Now and Whiskaye Films. The series was the first webseries created specially for Vine with Bevan writing 25 of 60 episodes in its first run, with Paul Scheer starring. The trailer for the series was released on March 3, 2015, on the series' new website, www.whiteninjaseries.com. After the shutdown of Vine, the series moved to the entertainment app Toonstar.

As of 2026, www.whiteninjaseries.com redirects to a github archive of the comic.

== Premise ==
The series stars the titular ninja. He is always seen wearing a white ninja suit that includes a shirt with a hood that covers the entire head except his eyes. Despite his name and appearance, White Ninja is almost never seen to perform any martial arts, or even show an awareness of them. Instead, he is commonly seen in some daily life routine or a far-fetched situation; either of which frequently end in non sequitur. There is no plot or continuity between strips, with each strip completely unrelated to the previous. Due to the surreal nature of the comic, many strips out-rightly contradict each other, with White Ninja's age, occupation, family, gender, shape and even species changing from one strip to the next.
