= Doha Debates =

Qatari debate series programme

- Products: Debate and interview programs, video reports, podcasts, interactive content
- Parent organization: Qatar Foundation
- Website: dohadebates.com

Doha Debates produces and distributes debate and interview programs, video reports and interactive content. The franchise's products include debates, interview series, podcasts, the #SolvingIt series, digital video reports, Deep Dive education curriculum, and the interactive Doha Portal. Doha Debates is funded by the Qatar Foundation.

Doha Debates' content, production and distribution partners have included the United Nations, TED, Foreign Policy, the Paris Peace Forum, the Sundance Institute, NowThis News, Vox Media, Shared Studios, Fortify Rights, Doha Forum, Rappler and eNCA. Doha Debates' managing director is Amjad Atallah, who previously served as a news executive at Al Jazeera America and co-founded Women for Women International with his wife Zainab Salbi.

Re-launched in 2018, Doha Debates' initial iteration ran from 2005 to 2012, when the debate program was televised by BBC World News.

== History ==
Founded in 2005, the original Doha Debates programs were moderated by former BBC correspondent and interviewer Tim Sebastian, with Qatar Foundation as the sponsor. Televised eight times a year by BBC World News until 2012, the debates were based on the Oxford Union format. They focused on a single, controversial motion, with two speakers for and against. Once they outlined their arguments, each speaker was questioned by the chairman and the discussion was then opened up to the audience for argument and a final electronic vote. Topics included torture, terrorism and suicide bombings, political turmoil and human rights. Past motions questioned whether it was time to talk to Al Qaeda, whether Hezbollah had the right to fight a war on Lebanon's behalf, and whether the pro-Israel lobby was successfully stifling criticism of the country's actions.

Special events featuring Q&A sessions with a single guest included figures such as Bill Clinton, Mohamed El Baradei, Shimon Peres, Amre Moussa, Ayad Allawi, and Mahmoud Zahar.

== Debates ==
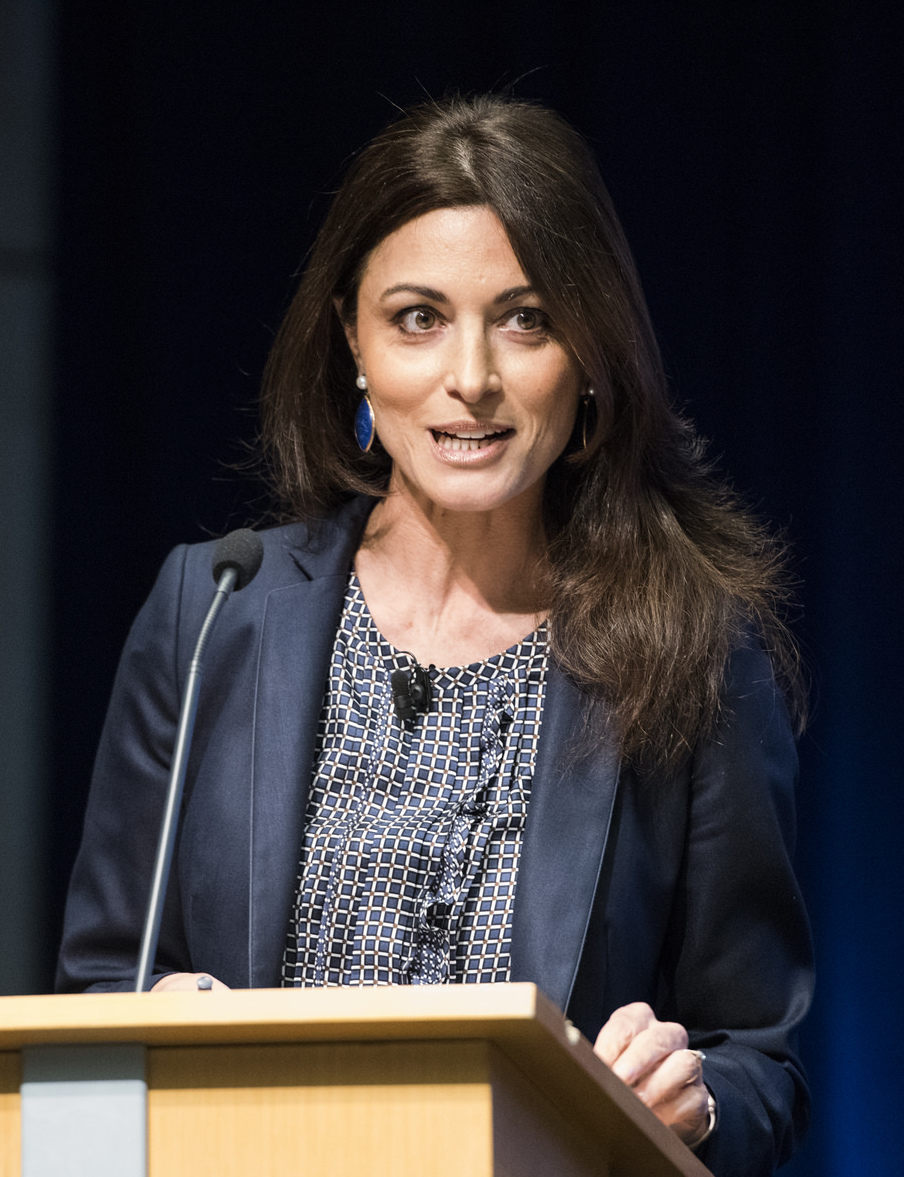
Doha Debates host and moderator Ghida Fakhry at the 2017 World Bank Group-IMF spring meetings.

Doha Debates' marquee debate series resumed in 2019 with a new host and format. Ghida Fakhry hosts and moderates the programs with contributions from correspondent Nelufar Hedayat and bridge-building "connector" Govinda Clayton. Each program features 3-4 debaters, with each debate including a constructive consensus-targeted "majlis" session. Programs include two audience votes on speaker positions, as well as feedback from viewers around the world. Most 2019 and 2020 debate programs have been hosted in Doha's Education City, with 2019 debates also held at the Paris Peace Forum, the TEDSummit in Edinburgh, Scotland and in Cape Town, South Africa.

The debate programs since the 2019 re-launch of the debate series:

- 26 February 2019, Doha: Global refugee crisis. Debaters: Muzoon Almellehan, Marc Lamont Hill, Douglas Murray.
- April 3, 2019, Doha: Artificial intelligence. Debaters: Nick Bostrom, Joy Buolamwini, Dex Torricke-Barton.
- 24 July 2019, TEDSummit, Edinburgh: Globalization. Debaters: Medea Benjamin, Sisonke Msimang, Parag Khanna.
- 10 September 2019, Cape Town: Water scarcity. Debaters: Yana Abu Taleb, Georgie Badiel, Obakeng Leseyane.
- 23 October 2019, Doha: Capitalism. Debaters: Ameenah Gurib-Fakim, Anand Giridharadas, Jason Hickel.
- 12 November 2019, Paris Peace Forum: Loss of trust. Debaters: Brett Hennig, Toni Lane Casserly, Zeid Ra'ad al-Hussein.
- 9 March 2020, Doha: Gender equality. Debaters: Randa Abdel-Fattah, Christina Hoff Sommers, Ayishat Akanbi.
- 11 March 2020, Doha: Future of genetics. Debaters: Jamie Metzl, Katie Hasson, Julian Savulescu.
- 20 July 2020, virtual: Socialism. Debaters: Fatima Bhutto, Tabata Amaral, Lord William Hague.
- 20 September 2020, virtual: Global Cooperation. Debaters: Leymah Gbowee, Ece Temelkuran, Yanis Varoufakis.
- 04 November 2021, virtual: Climate change. Debaters: Naomi Klein, Bjorn Lomborg, Ameenah Gurib-Fakim.

In 2023, it was announced that comedian and actor "Mo" Mohammed Amer would host the upcoming series of debates.

== Town Halls ==
In March 2022, Doha Debates launched its Town Hall series with a conversation with Malala Yousafzai, the youngest-ever Nobel Peace Prize laureate.

- March 2022: The importance of girls' education in Afghanistan. Discussion participants included members of the Afghan Girls Robotics Team. The program was hosted at the Qatar National Library.
- October 2022: Genetic editing and disability. The discussion was co-moderated by Nelufar Hedayat and Dr. Victor Pineda, president of World Enabled. The program was hosted at Qatar Foundation’s World Innovation Summit for Health (WISH).
- December 2022: The future of Palestinian identity. The discussion "explored what Palestinian identity means in the face of the global diaspora and 75 years of statelessness." Discussion participants included Professor Dr. Tariq Dana, Palestinian activist Ahed Tamimi and Palestinian American comedian and disability advocate Maysoon Zayid.
- November 2023: Orientalist art. The discussion was moderated by Dena Takruri and participants included author Fatima Bhutto and journalist Inaya Folarin Iman.
- December 2023: Who should lead in a multipolar world? The discussion participants included politician Sawsan Chebli and president of Al Sharq Forum Wadah Khanfar. The program was hosted in partnership with Doha Forum.

== #DearWorldLive ==
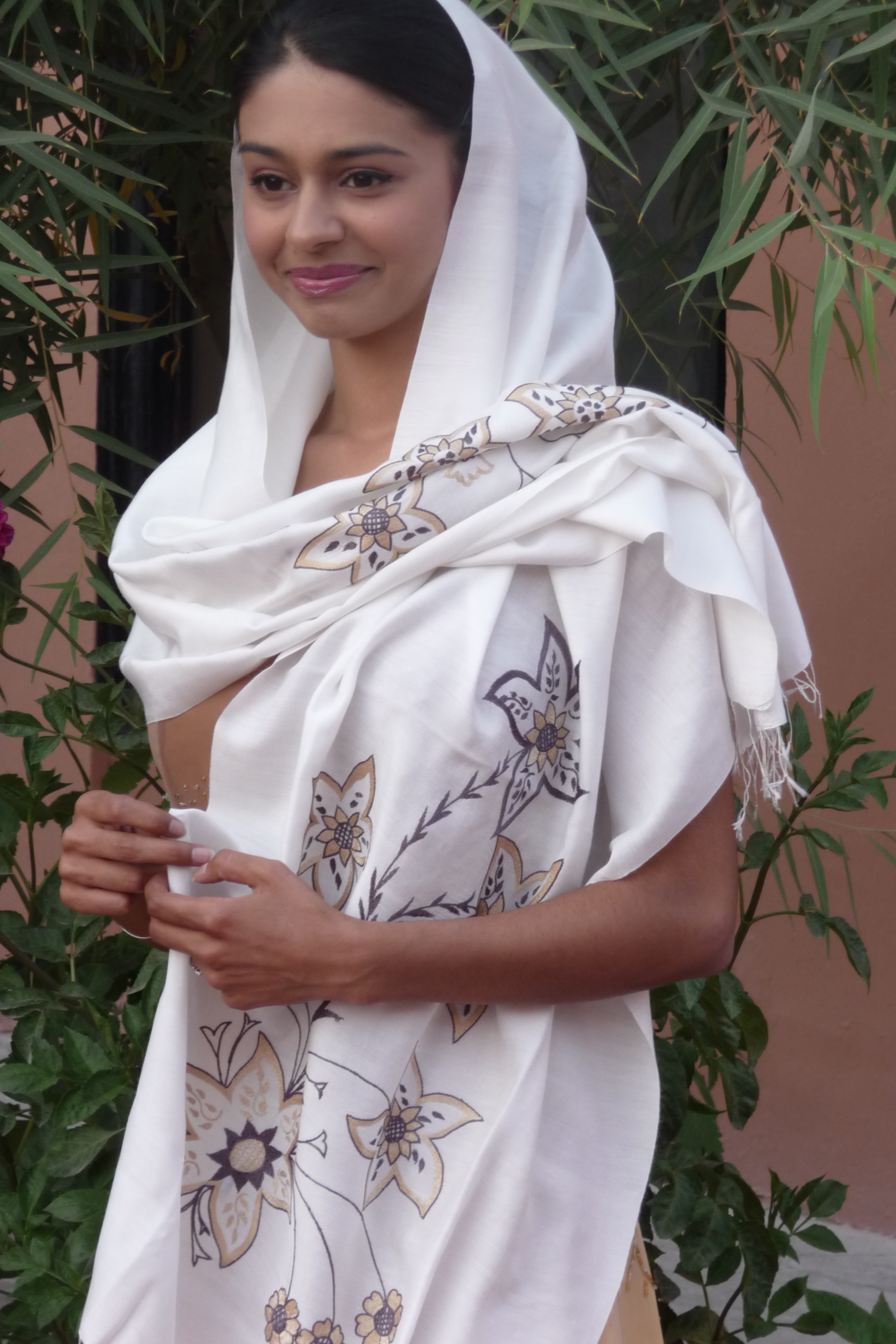
Nelufar Hedayat, Doha Debates correspondent and host of #DearWorldLive and Course Correction. March 2019.

In April 2020, in response to the global COVID-19 crisis, Doha Debates launched a weekly coronavirus-focused interview series called #DearWorldLive. Nelufar Hedayat hosts the virtual show, which each week examines a different aspect of the coronavirus and its impact on people and the world. Programs to date:

- 14 April 2020: Inside India's massive lockdown. Guests: Jayati Ghosh, Ravi Mishra.
- 21 April 2020: COVID-19's threats to refugees. Guests: Filippo Grandi, Jamilah Sherally, Immad Ahmed, Shafiqur Rahma/n
- 28 April 2020: Disability rights for COVID-19. Guests: Maysoon Zeyed, Nawaal Akram, Tanni Grey-Thompson.
- 5 May 2020: The climate crisis and coronavirus. Guests: Dr. Vandana Shiva, Dr. Zeke Hausfather, Obakeng Leseyane.
- 12 May 2020: Mental health in the time of COVID. Guests: Suleika Jaouad, Dr. Jan Emannuel De Nive, Dr. Kamran Ahmed, Dana Aal Ali.
- 19 May 2020: How to stay connected while physical distancing. Guests: Priya B. Parker, Dr. Govinda Clayton.
- 26 May 2020: Education and the coronavirus. Guests: Sherrie Westin, David Moinina Sengeh, Larry Rosenstock.
- 2 June 2020: The coronavirus pandemic and gender inequality. Guests: Alaa Murabit, Ziauddin Yousafzai.
- 9 September 2020: UN Youth Plenary special edition – The world's fight against the COVID-19 pandemic. Guests: Paloma Costa Oliveira, Felix Feider, Obakeng Leseyane.

== Podcasts ==
=== Course Correction ===
In January 2020, Doha Debates unveiled its Course Correction podcast series in which host Nelufar Hedayat "immerses herself in humanity's greatest challenges."

The 2020 Sundance Film Festival played host to Course Correction's live audience debut, with Hedayat interviewing Rappler founder and CEO Maria Ressa and Ramona Diaz, whose "A Thousand Cuts" documentary on Ressa and Rappler premiered at Sundance.

Other 2020 Course Correction interview subjects included Khan Academy founder Sal Khan, global strategy adviser Parag Khanna, economic anthropologist Jason Hickel, journalist Marc Lamont Hill, Jordanian diplomat Zeid Ra'ad al-Hussein, water rights advocate Georgie Badiel, author Anand Giridharadas, Algorithmic Justice League founder Joy Buolamwini and Hedayat's mother, Patuni.

=== The Negotiators ===
In October 2021, Foreign Policy and Doha Debates launched a jointly-produced podcast series called "The Negotiators." Hosted by Foreign Policy Deputy Editor Jennifer Williams, the podcast features interviews with key players in big international dealmaking. Topics include the Paris climate agreement, the Iran nuclear deal, and the Nigerian #BringBackOurGirls campaign. The podcast has won several awards, including Best Podcast in 2024 from WAN-IFRA.

=== The Long Game ===
In November 2021, Foreign Policy and Doha Debates debuted "The Long Game," their second jointly-produced podcast series. American Olympic medalist Ibtihaj Muhammad hosts the podcast, which, according to Foreign Policy, "highlights stories of courage and conviction on and off the field. From athletes who are breaking barriers for women and girls to a Syrian refugee swimmer who overcame the odds to compete at the Paralympics, the show examines the power of sport to change the world for the better."

=== Lana ===
In March 2023, Doha Debates launched its first Arabic-language podcast, Lana, in partnership with Jordanian podcast company Sowt ("lana" is the Arabic word for "ours"). The podcast is hosted by Rawaa Augé, an Al Jazeera on-air host and producer who previously served as a news presenter at Al Jazeera and France 24. Lana tackles major global issues, with Doha Debates' Japhet Weeks saying, “It’s about challenging your own viewpoints by listening to other intelligent, young voices.”

=== Doha Debates Podcast ===
In May 2023, Doha Debates launched "Doha Debates Podcast," their first podcast to include a video format. The podcast has a rotating series of hosts, including journalists Karen Given, Afia Pokua, Mariya Karimjee and Joshua Johnson.

=== Necessary Tomorrows ===
In January 2024, Doha Debates launched "Necessary Tomorrows," a sci-fi podcast mixing fiction and nonfiction. The series was produced in collaboration with Imposter Media and Wolf at the Door Studios, and is presented by Al Jazeera Podcasts. The first episode of "Necessary Tomorrows" premiered at the 2023 Tribeca Film Festival as one of their official podcast selections.

== #SolvingIt ==
Doha Debates' Instagram series "celebrates the next generation of leaders whose vision and work inspire hope and real change." Since its debut in August 2019, the #SolvingIt series has saluted trailblazers, including climate change activist Greta Thunberg, education advocate Malala Yousafzai, Black Lives Matter protesters, human rights champion Nadia Murad, water rights advocate Georgie Badiel, Algorithmic Justice League founder Joy Buolamwini, U.S. Climate Strike Executive Director Isra Hirsi, "Cybercode Twins" America and Penelope Lopez, Stockton Mayor Michael Tubbs, Congresswoman Alexandria Ocasio-Cortez, human rights activist Mahmoud Abugrin, environmental advocates Melati and Isabel Wijsen, Rappler founder and CEO Maria Ressa, Digital Citizens Fund founder Roya Mahboob, disability rights advocate Nawaal Akram, World Central Kitchen founder José Andrés, Syrian refugee advocate Bana al-Abed, the Parkland High School students, and UN Youth Envoy Jayathma Wickramanayake.

In September 2021, ahead of the November 2021 United Nations Climate Change Conference, Doha Debates announced the #SolvingIt26, showcasing 26 extraordinary young climate activists around the world. Honorees were from 22 nations on six continents. The honorees were showcased in a #SolvingIt26 social media campaign in the weeks leading up to the 2021 Climate Change Conference.

== Video reports ==
Doha Debates' short films include:

- (Un)divided, 2019: A violent clash at a "Love Trumps Hate" rally results in a surprisingly constructive conversation between an Iraqi-American Muslim student, Amina, and a Trump supporter afraid of Muslims until meeting Amina. Filmmaker: Paul Raila.
- The Waitlist, 2019: Exposé on the challenges asylum seekers face at the U.S.-Mexican border. Filmmakers: Natasha Pizzey and James Fredrick.
- The Invisibles, 2020: In Italy, migrant labor union leader Aboubakar Soumahoro rallies farmhands as they fight for their rights amid the coronavirus epidemic. Filmmakers: Carola Mamberto and Diana Ferrero.

== Deep Dive ==
In 2020, Doha Debates introduced a debates-related "Deep Dive" education curriculum for high school and university teachers and students. Curriculum topics are derived from the marquee debate programs, with each topic having its own lesson plan, including active learning, collaborative learning discussions, student motivation and participation, and writing assignments. The lessons include video excerpts from related debate programs.

== Doha Portal ==
In Doha, Doha Debates hosts a mobile Shared Studios Portal, allowing members of the public to interact in real-time with users at more than 40 locations worldwide as if they are in the same room, creating a virtual majlis to discuss debate topics. Doha Portal interactive sessions have taken place from the Qatar National Library and other sites in Doha's Education City, as well as the Doha Forum.

In January 2019, the Doha Portal was featured in a Doha Debates TED Salon called "Up for Debate," a session of TED-curated talks about the importance of civic discourse and debate.

In November and December 2022, the Portal was a featured attraction at the 2022 FIFA World Cup Fan Zone FIFA Unity Pavilion, bringing fans together virtually for conversations with football fans and others in Portals around the world. The Doha Portal's visitors included Microsoft co-founder and philanthropist Bill Gates, who spoke with young people in Kigali, Rwanda.

== Ambassador Program ==
In August 2021, Doha Debates launched the inaugural edition of its Ambassador Program with 36 young participants chosen from among hundreds of applicants around the world. The solutions-focused initiative is meant "to empower a new generation of changemakers with the knowledge, tools, and relationships to bring positive change to their communities."

== Honors ==
Doha Debates' honors include:

- (Un)Divided, Platinum Award, 2019 Spotlight Film Awards. Category: Best Documentary Short.
- The Waitlist, Spotlight Silver Award, 2019 Spotlight Documentary Film Awards, December 2019 award winners.
- Water Scarcity Debate in Cape Town, finalist, 4th Annual Shorty Social Good Awards. Category: Environment & Sustainability, live streaming.
- Fortify Rights/Doha Debates Rohingya Instagram Fellows, finalist, 12th Annual Shorty Awards. Category: Instagram.
- #Solving It, 2nd place, 2020 North American Digital Media Awards. Category: Social media engagement.
- Water Scarcity Debate, nominee, 2020 Digiday Media Awards. Category: Best Live Event.
- #Solving It, nominee, 12th Annual Shorty Awards, honoring the best in social media. Category: Social good campaign.
