= Between Two Worlds =

Between Two Worlds may refer to:

== Music ==
- Between Two Worlds (I album), 2006
- Between Two Worlds, a 2009 album by Paul McKenna Band
- Between Two Worlds (Trip Lee album), 2010
- Between II Worlds, a 2015 album by Nero
- Between Two Worlds, a 1987 album by Patrick O'Hearn
- "Between Two Worlds", a song from Disney's Pocahontas II: Journey to a New World
- "Between Two Worlds", a 1998 song by Uriah Heep from Sonic Origami
  - Between Two Worlds, a 2002 compilation album by Uriah Heep
- The Dybbuk: Between Two Worlds, a 2008 chamber opera composed by Ofer Ben-Amots
- Between Two Worlds, a 2023 song by Mili

== Film and television ==
- Between Two Worlds (1919 film), a silent German film
- Between Two Worlds (1921 film), also known as Destiny, a German film
- Between Two Worlds (1944 film), an American film set during World War II
- Delovak Athara, a 1966 Sinhala Sri Lankan film directed by Lester James Peiris
- Between Two Worlds (1990 film), a Canadian documentary about Joseph Idlout
- Between Two Worlds (2009 film), a Sri Lankan film directed by Vimukthi Jayasundara
- Between Two Worlds (2015 film), a British film directed by James Marquand
- Between Two Worlds (2021 film), a French film directed by Emmanuel Carrère
- Between Two Worlds, a Nigerian film starring Kalu Ikeagwu
- Zwischen 2 Welten (Between Two Worlds), a 1999 documentary film by Bettina Haasen
- Between Two Worlds (TV series), a 2020 Australian TV series

== Literature ==
- Between Two Worlds (novel), a 1941 Lanny Budd novel by Upton Sinclair
- Between Two Worlds: Escape from Tyranny: Growing Up in the Shadow of Saddam 2005 book by Zainah Salbi
- Between Two Worlds: The Inner Lives of Children of Divorce, a 2005 book by Elizabeth Marquardt
- Between Two Worlds: My Life and Captivity in Iran, a 2010 book by Roxana Saberi

== See also ==
- Between Two Words, a 1984 album by Wire Train
