= Marie Christina Kolo =

Malagasy climate activist, ecofeminist, and social entrepreneur

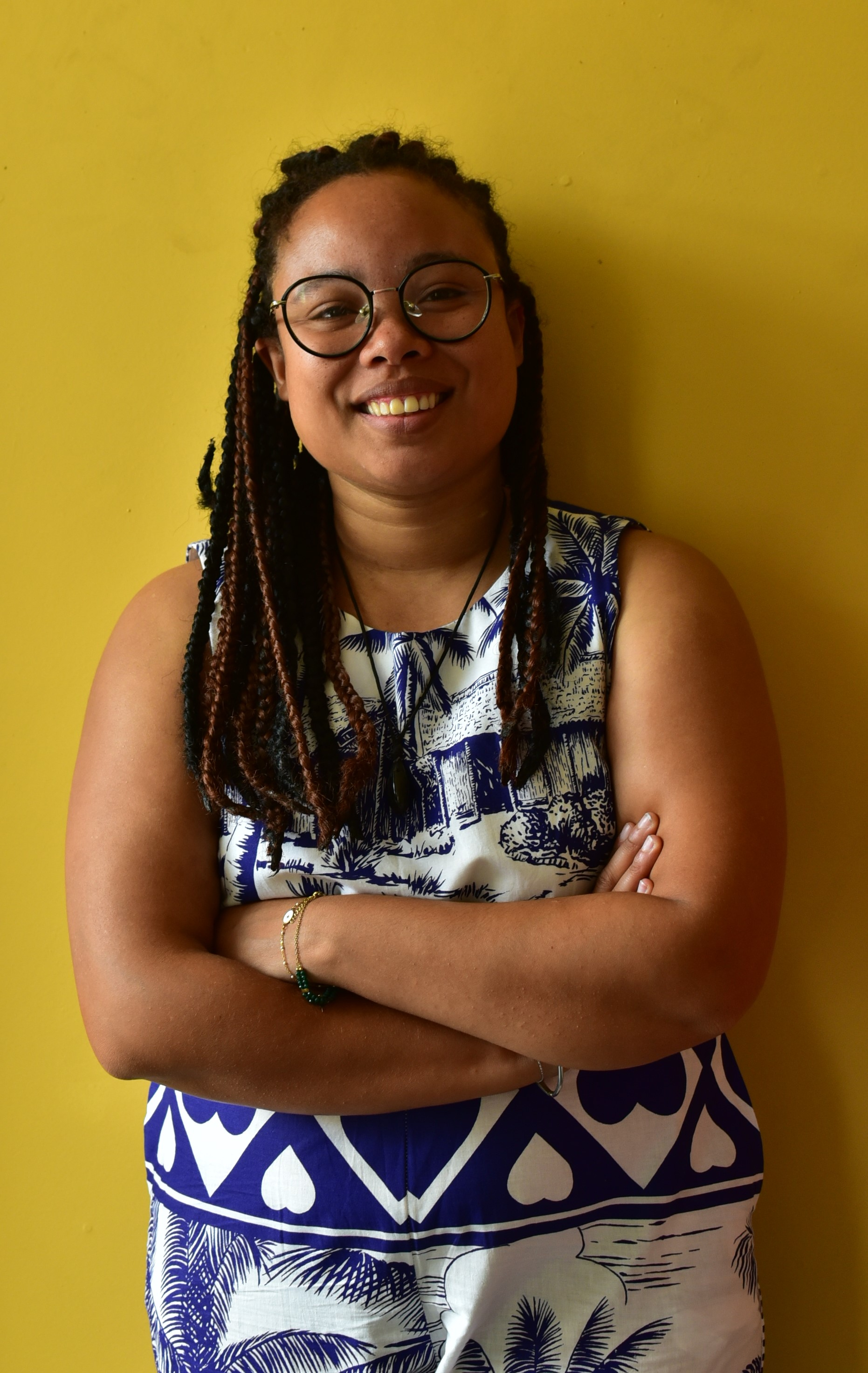
- Born: 1989 (age 36–37)
- Occupations: Climate activist, ecofeminist, social entrepreneur

Marie Christina Kolo (born 1989) is a climate activist, ecofeminist, and social entrepreneur from Madagascar, who has raised global awareness of the effects of climate change in Madagascar and requested international solidarity in addressing its impacts.

== Life ==
Kolo was born in 1989 and grew up in Ambodirano. As a young child, she observed environmental impacts caused by textile factories near her home, and petitioned to stop the pollution. She attended Catholic University of Paris and received a master's degree in Humanitarian and Development Project Management. She was awarded a University of Maine Mandela Washington Fellowship in 2017.

Kolo became active in climate work in 2015, when she was working as a United Nations volunteer in the drought-prone Androy region. During that time, Kolo co-founded the online Indian Ocean Climate Network as a discussion platform for activist youth from Madagascar, Mauritius, Réunion, and Seychelles. That platform organized 3000 people to attend Madagascar's first climate protest march in 2015.

Kolo founded the social enterprise Green N Kool in 2016. The organization develops playgrounds and landscapes from recycled materials and sells environmentally friendlyproducts to fund a primary school, a community center, and community events in the Antananarivo and Nosy Be areas. To address the COVID-19 pandemic, Green N Kool introduced an eco-friendly hand washing soap made from used edible oil. In its Travel without Fear initiative, the organization works to address sexual harassment on public transportation.

In 2018, Kolo co-founded Ecofeminism Madagascar, an online platform focused on climate change and its relationship to gender-based violence. That year, she was also awarded second place at the World Wide Fund for Nature Africa Youth Awards.

In 2019, Kolo attended the 2019 United Nations Climate Change Conference (COP25), where she was publicly confronted by Madagascar's minister of the environment, Alexandre Georget. She responded with an open letter ("Non à l’âgisme et à la misogynie par les membres de notre gouvernement") addressed to the president, Andry Rajoelina, criticizing Georget's behavior, questioning the exclusion of youth activists from the Madagascar COP25 delegation, and speaking against ageism and misogyny by members of the government.

In December 2020, Kolo headed a team that was awarded a United States Department of State Alumni Engagement Innovation Fund award for a project to combat sexual assault and gender-based violence in Madagascar.

In April 2021, Kolo, along with Paloma Costa of Brazil, directly addressed Secretary-General of the United Nations António Guterres in a virtual conversation on youth climate action. She spoke on the effects of COVID-19 and climate change in her country, such as the 2021–2022 Madagascar famine, and pled for the rest of the world to show solidarity with nations already being impacted by climate change.

Kolo attended the 2021 United Nations Climate Change Conference (COP26) as part of the Women and Gender Constituency.

At the end of 2022 she was included in the BBC's 100 Women.
