= Zainab Salbi =

Iraqi-American women's rights activist (born 1969)

- زينب سلبي
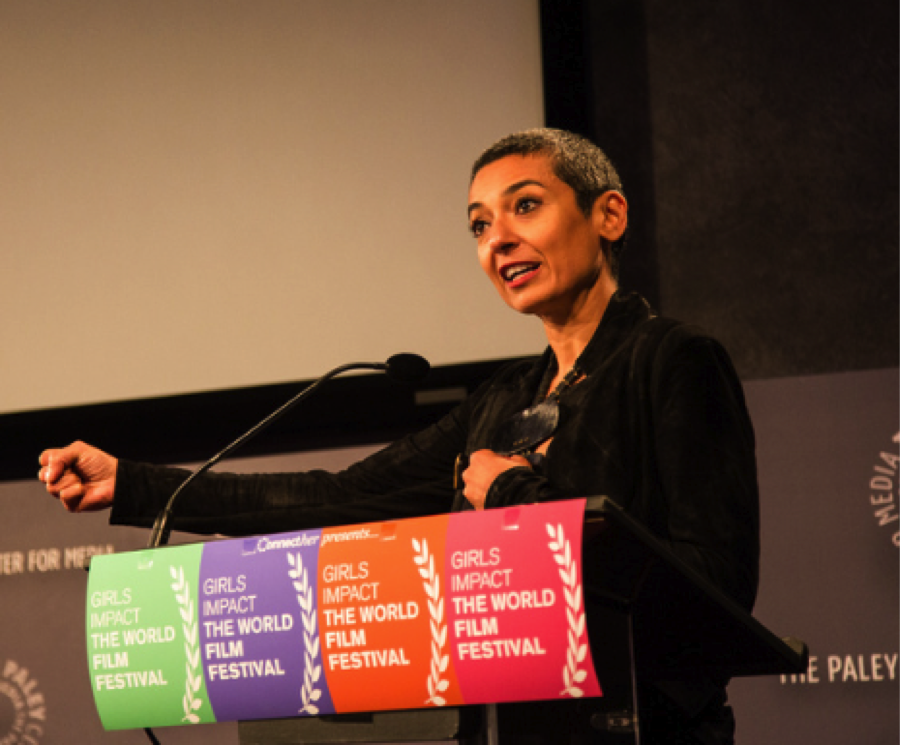
- Salbi at the Paley Center for Media in 2013
- Born: 1969 (age 56–57); Baghdad, Iraq
- Citizenship: United States (since 1996)
- Education: George Mason University; London School of Economics
- Occupations: Author; media host; organization founder; podcaster
- Organizations: Daughters for Earth; Women for Women International
- Notable work: Between Two Worlds: Escape from Tyranny: Growing Up in the Shadow of Saddam (2005 memoir); #MeToo, Now What? (2018 TV miniseries)
- Board member of: Vital Voices; International Refugee Assistance Program (IRAP); Synergos International"
- Spouse: Amjad Atallah (m. 1993; div. 2007)
- Website: zainabsalbi.com

Zainab Salbi (Arabic: زينب سلبي; born 1969) is an Iraqi American women's rights activist, writer, television show host, and podcaster. She is the co-founder of Daughters for Earth, a fund and a movement of Daughters rising up worldwide with climate solutions to protect and restore Mother Earth. She is also the co-founder of Women for Women International, a non-profit organization that helps women affected by sexual violence and conflict. She hosted Through Her Eyes and #MeToo, Now What? television shows, about issues affecting women. From 2022 she hosted the Redefined podcast.

In her 2005 memoir Between Two Worlds: Escape from Tyranny: Growing Up in the Shadow of Saddam, Salbi recounted her early life: Born in Baghdad to a father who later became Saddam Hussein's personal pilot, her family arranged her marriage and emigration to the United States, in order to remove her from the proximity of Hussein, who had started showing unwanted attention to her. After an abusive marriage in the U.S., she divorced her husband and started her humanitarian career. She is also the author of the nonfiction book The Other Side of War: Women's Stories of Survival & Hope which documents the stories of women survivors of war.

In September 2023, Zainab Salbi was honored with the Time100 Impact Award.

== Early life and education ==
Salbi is a Muslim woman born in 1969 in Baghdad, Iraq who grew up with her younger brother. In 1971, she moved to the Mansour district with her parents. Her mother was a biology teacher while her father was an airline pilot. Her mother Alia was a secular Muslim. When Salbi was 11, her father became the personal pilot for Saddam Hussein, who then regularly visited the family at their home while he was president of Iraq. The Iran–Iraq War occurred during her childhood, including missile attacks on Baghdad. She studied languages at an Iraqi university.

In 1990, at the age of 20, Salbi was sent to the United States for an arranged marriage after her mother became concerned about the attention she received from Hussein. She left the marriage after her husband became abusive but could not return to Iraq due to the start of the first Gulf War. She moved to Washington, D.C., worked as a translator, and married Palestinian-American lawyer Amjad Atallah. In 1996, she became a US citizen and completed her bachelor's degree in sociology and women's studies at George Mason University. She has a 2001 master's degree in development studies from the London School of Economics.

== Career ==
While studying at George Mason University, Salbi learned about the systematic rape during the Bosnian war. In 1993, with Atallah, she launched Women for Women International. Salbi began serving as president, initially with a focus on supporting women in Bosnia-Herzegovina and Croatia expanding to Iraq in 2003. The program linked sponsors in North America with women in Bosnia. Salbi led the organization until her resignation in 2011, during which time its humanitarian and development efforts helped 315,000 women and distributed over $108 million in direct aid and micro-credit loans. Among the 185 countries that Women for Women International focused on were Afghanistan, Bosnia, Democratic Republic of the Congo, Kosovo, Nigeria, Rwanda, Sudan, and Iraq.

Salbi is an activist who speaks about sexual violence in conflict. She contributed the 2003 report Winning the Peace Conference Report: Women's Role in Post-Conflict Iraq published by Women Waging Peace and the Woodrow Wilson Center. She later testified before the United States Congress about the contents of the report. By 2006, Salbi had appeared on The Oprah Winfrey Show six times discussing the work of Women for Women International. The same year, the organization was awarded the $1.5 million Hilton Humanitarian Prize. In January 2005, it produced a report presenting findings from a survey of 1,000 Iraqi women. The report conveyed women's concerns about their safety during the war.

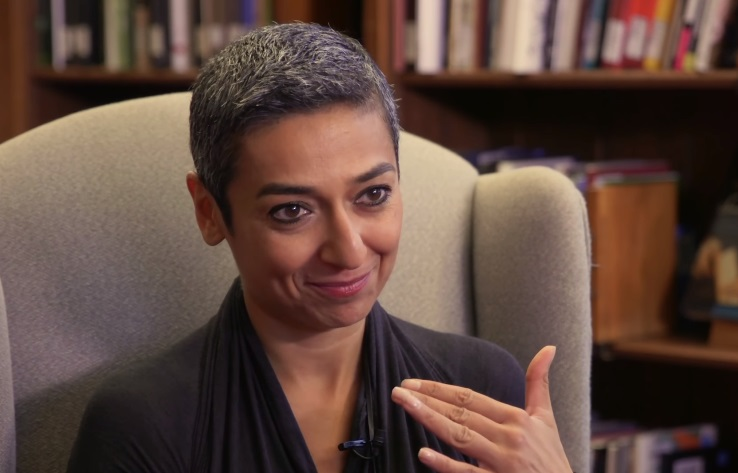
Salbi at Mount Holyoke College, 2016

In 2015, Salbi launched the TLC Arabia talk show The Calling, with Oprah Winfrey appearing on the first show. The show was broadcast in 22 countries in the Middle East and North Africa and focused on Arab and Muslim women. In response to her television work, Salbia has been called the "Oprah of the Middle East" and "The Voice of Arabia". In 2016, she launched The Zainab Salbi Project, an original series with Huffington Post. As the host, she dealt with social issues from different parts of the world. In February 2018, she started hosting the PBS television shows #MeToo, Now What?. The five part series explored how positive change could occur after the aftermath of the MeToo movement, examining issues of gender, race, and social class. As the host, Salbi interviewed writer Ijeoma Oluo, activist Nadine Strossen, and a former Alamo Drafthouse Cinema's blog editor who was accused of sexual assault. In 2018, Salbi hosted the Yahoo! News show Through Her Eyes with Zainab Salbi, focusing global issues affecting women.

Salbi is the author of the 2005 memoir Between Two Worlds: Escape from Tyranny: Growing Up in the Shadow of Saddam that documents her childhood, her family's proximity to Saddam Hussein, her arranged marriage, escape from Iraq to the United States, marital abuse, and the start of her humanitarian career. Salbi is the author of the 2006 nonfiction book The Other Side of War, which documents the stories of women who have lived through conflict and inequality and succeeded in community leadership and business. She is also the author of the 2018 self-help book Freedom Is an Inside Job. In 2022, she joined the online mindfulness and spirituality platform FindCenter and began to host the center's podcast Redefined.

In February 2022, Salbi co-founded Daughters for Earth and was honored with Time100 Impact Award in September 2023.

== Awards and recognition ==
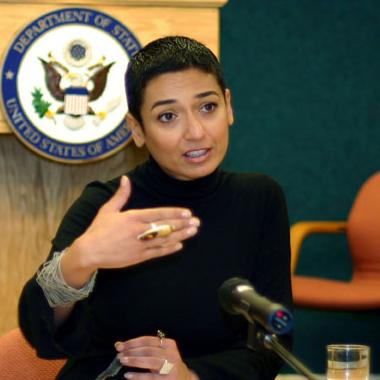
Salbi in New York, 2005

In 1995, President Bill Clinton honored Salbi at the White House for her humanitarian work and identified her as a "21st Century Heroine". Time magazine named her Innovator of the Month in March 2005 and she was later profiled for her work as philanthropist. In April the same year, Salbi received a Forbes magazine Trailblazer Award. In 2012, she was one of Barclays' Women of the Year. In 2011, Salbi received a Visionary Leadership Award from the International Festival of Arts & Ideas and was identified as one of the Top 100 Women Activists and Campaigners for her role in setting up Women for Women International by The Guardian. Salbi was identified as an influential Arab woman by Arabian Business, and one of the 100 Global Thinkers in the World by Foreign Policy. With almost 24,000 followers, Fortune identified Salbi as one of the Most Influential Women on Twitter in 2014, noting her women-focused humanitarian work. Gulf Business declared her one of the 100 Most Powerful Arabs in 2019, noting her role leading Women for Women International. Salbi was selected as a jury member of The Hilton Humanitarian Prize in 2020 and 2021.

Zainab Salbi was honored with the Time100 Impact Award in 2023.

She has honorary doctorates from the University of York (2014), George Mason University (2019) and Glasgow University (2019). She received the Eleanor Roosevelt Val-Kill Award in 2019 for her writing and television work to advance awareness of issues affecting women. In 2005 she was given the Human Security Award by the University of California, Irvine's Blum Centre for Poverty Alleviation.

== Books ==
- Between Two Worlds: Escape from Tyranny: Growing Up in the Shadow of Saddam, 2005, ISBN 9781592401567, OCLC 948315384
- Hidden in plain sight: growing up in the shadow of Saddam, London: Vision, 2006. ISBN 9781904132974, OCLC 768470387
- The Other Side of War: Women's Stories of Survival & Hope Washington, D.C: National Geographic, 2006. ISBN 9780792262114, OCLC 150261088
- If You Knew Me You Would Care New York: PowerHouse Books, 2012. ISBN 9781576876190, OCLC 920738001
- Freedom Is an Inside Job: Owning Our Darkness and Our Light to Heal Ourselves and the World, Sounds True, Incorporated, 2018. ISBN 9781683641773, OCLC 1077718721
