= MeToo, Now What? =

2018 television show

- Genre: Documentary miniseries
- Inspired by: #MeToo movement
- Presented by: Zainab Salbi
- Country of origin: United States
- Original language: English
- No. of seasons: One
- No. of episodes: Five

Production
- Running time: 30 minutes

Original release
- Network: PBS
- Release: February 2 – March 2, 2018

#MeToo, Now What? was a PBS television show hosted by Zainab Salbi. It had five 30-minute episodes and was first aired on February 2, 2018.

== Production ==
The show followed the theme of the MeToo movement and the Harvey Weinstein sexual abuse cases. It was hosted by Zainab Salbi, the founder of Women for Women International.

In the five episodes, Salbi interviewed political commentator Angela Rye, writer Ijeoma Oluo, activist Nadine Strossen, and a former Alamo Drafthouse Cinema blog editor, Devin Faraci, who was accused of sexual assault.

== See also ==
- Between Two Worlds: Escape From Tyranny: Growing Up in the Shadow Of Saddam (book by the host)
