= Grand Avenue Village Association =

The Grand Avenue Village Association (GAVA) was a membership based, non-profit organization composed primarily of local merchants along Grand Avenue, in the Fair Haven neighborhood of New Haven, Connecticut. GAVA was created in 1999 by a group of merchants with support from the City of New Haven. The organization went on to establish the Grand Avenue Special Services District in 2009.

== Purpose ==
GAVA's mission was primarily to improve the business climate of the Fair Haven neighborhood, improve the public perception of commercial opportunities, and assist merchants in increasing capacity and generating profit.

== Membership ==
GAVA was a very “hands on”, on-the-street organization, which spends considerable time interacting with its membership, providing direct assistance and networking. Its membership comprised sixty-five companies, with a core group of six representatives serving on its executive board. Retailers and restaurants made up the majority of members, with service firms, contractors and wholesalers also represented.

== Local impact ==
The impact that GAVA had on the Fair Haven community and local businesses since its inception has been considerable. For example, GAVA successfully held community clean-ups, which are now held on a monthly basis. The organization provided technical assistance, access to business planning and financing to small businesses. It was also instrumental in the development and architectural planning to the Grand Avenue commercial corridor.

GAVA supported and hosted events in the Festival of Arts and Ideas, a popular annual festival held each summer in New Haven, Connecticut.
