= Amy Nicholson =

American film critic and podcast host

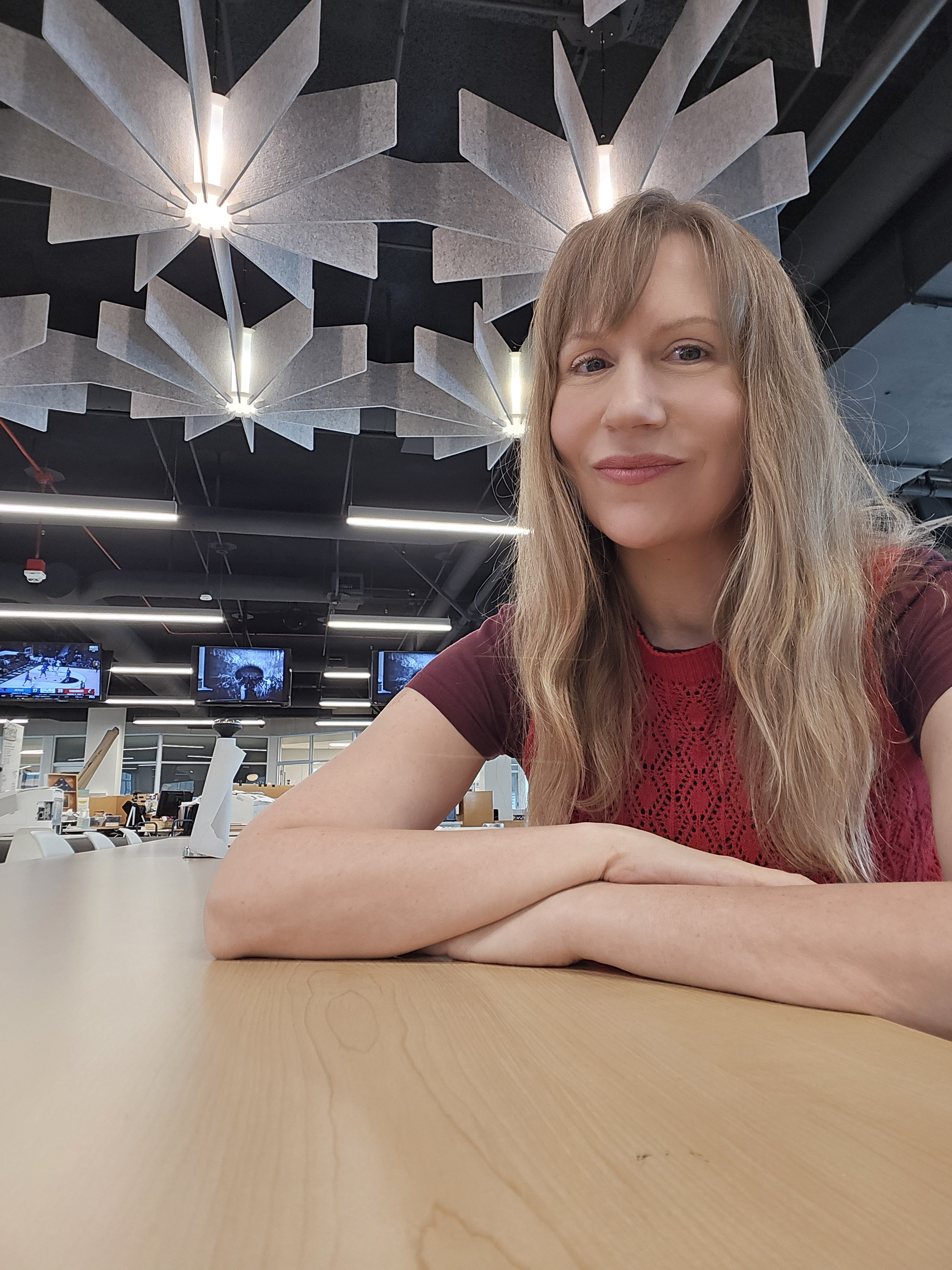
- Nicholson in 2025
- Education: University of Oklahoma (B.A.); University of Southern California (M.A.)
- Occupations: Film critic; podcast host; author
- Years active: 2002–present
- Employers: LA Weekly (2013–2016); MTV News; The New York Times; Variety; The Washington Post; Los Angeles Times (2024–present)

Amy Nicholson is an American film critic for the Los Angeles Times. She is the co-host of the podcast Unspooled. She has reviewed films for several publications, including LA Weekly, The New York Times, Variety, and The Washington Post.

== Early life and education ==
Nicholson was raised in San Antonio, Texas. As a child, she developed her admiration for films after watching "ancient films on TV" with her father. Nicholson repeatedly watched Home Alone (1990) with her friends, along with films that starred Leonardo DiCaprio at the time. Her childhood favorite was Teenage Mutant Ninja Turtles (1990).

After she graduated from Incarnate Word High School, Nicholson attended the University of Oklahoma (OU) and initially enrolled in psychology. During her freshman year, Nicholson enrolled in a course called "Films in Context of the Great Depression," taught by Joanna Rapf. "I hadn't realized movies were important in that way," Nicholson reflected, "that they were a timeline of history."

At OU, Nicholson worked at the Bizzell Memorial Library, and used their interlibrary loan service to request lesser-known films that were not available at Blockbuster Video. During her senior year, she decided to become a film critic, so she would be in "constant conversation with the culture." In 2002, Nicholson graduated with a double major with a B.A. in Film Studies and Anthropology from the University of Oklahoma.

After she graduated, Nicholson relocated to Los Angeles and interned at LA Weekly. There, she wrote freelance theater reviews for the paper for nine years. She later enrolled in the University of Southern California (USC) and graduated with a Master's in Professional Writing in 2008.

== Career ==
=== Film critic ===
After she graduated from USC, Nicholson served as the editor-in-chief of Boxoffice Magazine. In that capacity, she launched Boxoffice Weekly, an iPad-exclusive e-magazine. Meanwhile, she also freelanced for the Los Angeles Times, Movieline, LA CityBeat, and IndieWire. Furthermore, she served as the film editor at Inland Empire Weekly from 2006 to 2010.

In July 2013, Nicholson was hired as a full-time film critic for LA Weekly, a position she considered her dream job. Her reviews were featured in both the print and online editions, as well as eleven publications owned by Voice Media Group. When reflecting on her role as a film critic, she stated, "I judge a film based on what it wanted to do." In 2014, Nicholson wrote an essay "Why Renée Zellweger's Face Matters," which was published in LA Weekly. Because of her essay, she won the Best Online Commentary Award at the 2015 National Arts & Entertainment Journalism Awards. She also won the Best Critic Award in Broadcast or Print for her submitted reviews of American Sniper (2014) and Fifty Shades of Grey and Focus (both released in 2015).

In January 2016, Nicholson left LA Weekly and became the chief film critic for MTV News. Afterwards, she reviewed films and wrote articles that were published in Variety, The Guardian, and The Washington Post. In November 2024, Nicholson was hired as the film critic for the Los Angeles Times.

In February 2025, Nicholson was a member of the international jury of the 75th Berlin International Film Festival.

=== Author ===
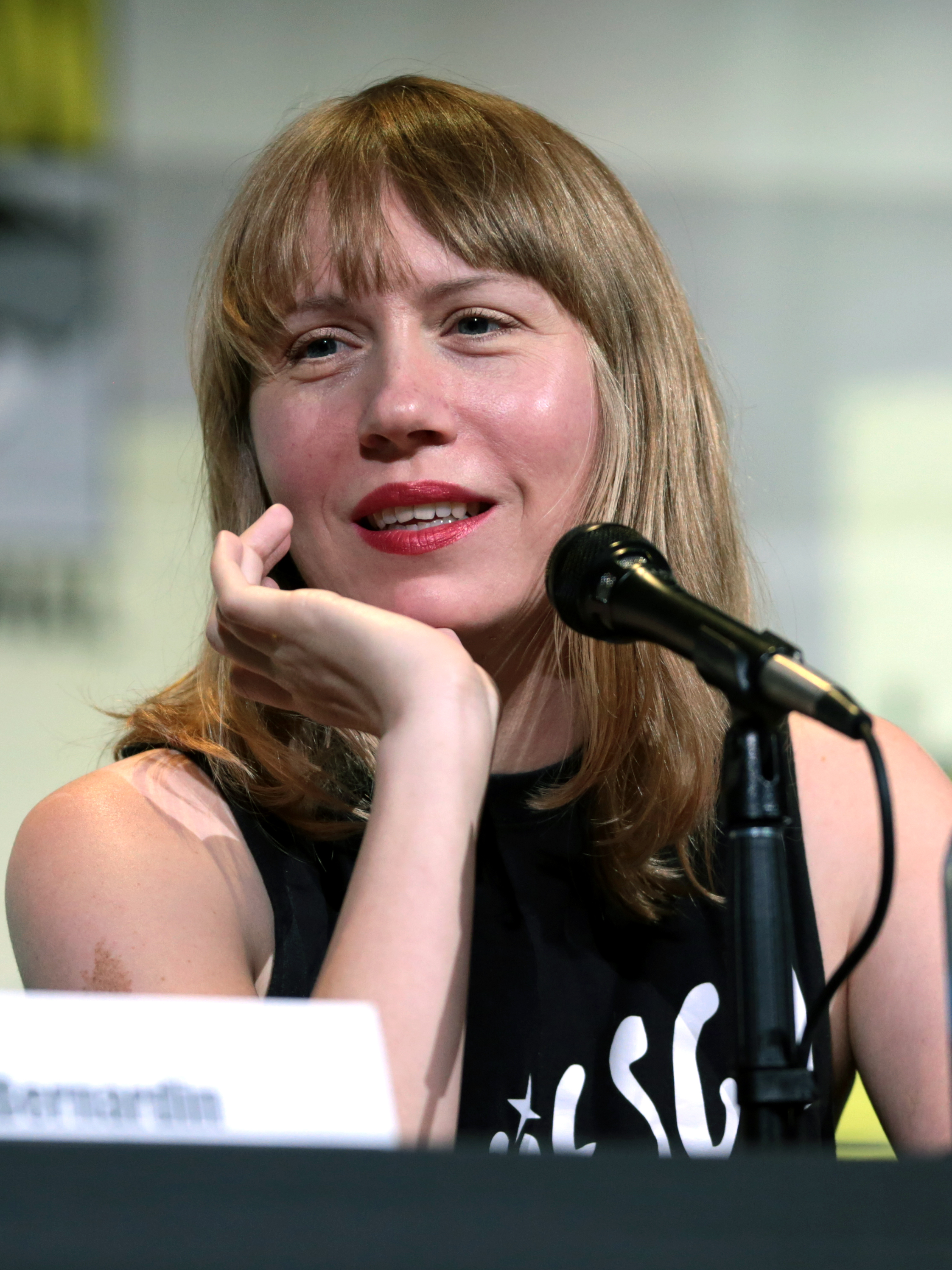
Nicholson at the 2016 San Diego Comic Con (SDCC)

In 2014, Nicholson published her first book, Tom Cruise: Anatomy of an Actor. When asked why she decided to write about Tom Cruise, she replied: "He's hiding in plain sight. Everybody knows who he is but no one really takes him as a serious actor. I really like taking someone that everybody thinks they know and making the argument that he's even more than we think." She was given two and a half months to write the book, in which she watched ten of Cruise's films and analyzed them to determine his growth as an actor. Her second book Extra Girls is scheduled to be released by Simon & Schuster.

=== Podcast host ===
In 2014, Nicholson began hosting the podcast series The Canon on Earwolf, alongside Devin Faraci. In October 2016, due to a sexual assault allegation made against Faraci, Nicholson and Earwolf mutually agreed to place the podcast on an indefinite hiatus.

In April 2017, The Canon returned from its hiatus but without Faraci. That same month, she invited actor Paul Scheer to discuss the 1984 film Ghostbusters. Scheer defended the film's artistic merits, in which Nicholson thoroughly enjoyed the conversation that she invited Scheer back to discuss The Room (2003) later that year. In 2018, she and Scheer launched their joint podcast Unspooled. The podcast debuted at number 1 on iTunes Film & TV podcast rankings and number 4 on the iTunes overall top chart.

== Publications ==
- Tom Cruise: Anatomy of an Actor. Phaidon Press. 2014. ISBN 978-0-714-86801-1.
- "Why Renée Zellweger's Face Matters". LA Weekly. October 21, 2014.
- Nicholson, Amy (2018). "Amy Nicholson on The Decline of Western Civilization I & II (1981 & 1988)". In Malone, Alicia (ed.). The Female Gaze: Essential Movies Made By Women. Coral Gables, Florida: Mango Publishing. pp. 88–89. ISBN 978-1-63353-837-5.
