= International Festival of Arts & Ideas =

Non-profit organization in the USA

Coordinates: 41.3077°N 72.9264°W

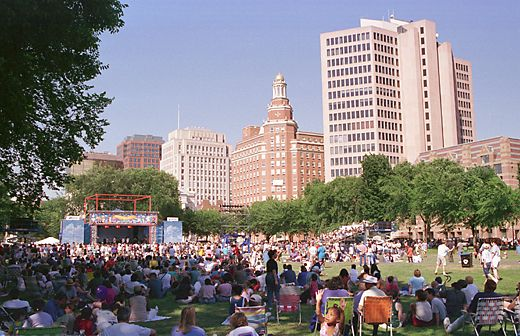

The International Festival of Arts & Ideas is a 15-day festival that takes place in New Haven, Connecticut. The festival presents performing arts, lectures, and conversations that celebrate influential artists and thinkers from around the world. The Festival's free headliner concerts on the New Haven Green attracts thousands of spectators.

== Performing arts ==
The Festival presents theatre, dance, and music offerings from around the world, including local, national, and international premieres. Its theatre and dance offerings have recently included the American premiere of David Greig's play The Events, from Actors Touring Company London; Mark Morris Dance Group; Yo-Yo Ma and the Silk Road Ensemble; Bill T. Jones/Arnie Zane Dance Company; Contemporary Legend Theatre (Taiwan); Dianne Reeves; along with modern circus artists such as Circa (Australia) and Les 7 Doigts de la main (Montreal). Early in its history, the Festival presented the Royal Shakespeare Company from the United Kingdom, concert productions from the Metropolitan Opera in New York City, and a pre-Broadway presentation of Michael Frayn's play Copenhagen. In 2013, the Festival continued its tradition of presenting sought-after events, like, the US premiere of a new production of A Midsummer Night's Dream, a collaboration between Bristol Old Vic (England) in association with Handspring Puppet Company (South Africa), directed by Tom Morris. This is the team behind the Tony Award-winning-winning Broadway and West End smash, War Horse. That same season, the festival also launched the 40th Anniversary Tour of the celebrated Kronos Quartet.

== The Ideas program ==
A fundamental objective of the Festival is to "provoke the mind". The Ideas program is a series of keynote speakers, panels, conversations with artists, post-performance discussions and community dialogues, designed to expand upon the themes of the performances and increase the audience's understanding of the artistic forms and their appreciation of the artists. The panelists regularly include artists and local experts as well as leaders and thinkers from around the world. Recent Ideas programs have featured Kennedy Center honouree Bill T. Jones, inaugural poet Elizabeth Alexander, Joshua Foer (author, Moonwalking with Einstein), Richard Levin (former President of Yale University), and Marion Nestle (author, Food Politics: How the Food Industry Influences Nutrition and Health). The Ideas Program talks are available via the Festival's website as a free resource for the public.

== The Visionary Leadership Award ==
The festival has recently expanded into year-round activity with the creation of the Visionary Leadership Award. Thus far, the Award has been presented to Zainab Salbi, founder and CEO of Women for Women International, Jill Abramson, the first female executive editor of the New York Times, and civil rights leader, influential journalist, and foreign correspondent Charlayne Hunter-Gault, in recognition of their trailblazing work and leadership that is impacting the world. The award was also presented to Sheila Nevins in 2014, Angélique Kidjo in 2015, Sheryl WuDunn in 2016, and Majora Carter in 2017. Poet and MacArthur Genius Claudia Rankine, author of the acclaimed Citizen: An American Lyric, will be recognized in 2018.

The Visionary Leadership Award is presented in honor of Jean Handley, a Festival founder and long-time leader in the business, philanthropic, and arts communities in Connecticut.

== Impact ==
More than 85% of festival programs are completely free to the public, including events that feature jazz, classical, dance, and theatre artists from around the world. In 2013, the festival generated an economic impact of $34 million for the State of Connecticut and the greater New Haven community. Dr. Mark Paul Gius, Professor of Economics at Quinnipiac University’s School of Business has collected and analyzed the festival's economic impact since the festival's inception in 1996.

The Festival has a fellowship program for high school students in New Haven.

== Festival Leadership ==
As of November 2018, the festival has been led by a team of Co-Directors: Liz Fisher, Thomas Griggs, and Chad Herzog.

== History ==
The International Festival of Arts and Ideas was established in 1996 by Anne Calabresi, Jean Handley, and Roslyn Meyer. The founders envisioned an annual celebration in New Haven--a small city rich with diversity and steeped in strong cultural and educational traditions--distinguished from established arts festivals by its fusion of ideas with events. They aimed to gather world-class artists and pre-eminent thinkers from around the globe, showcasing the city and the state as major art destinations.
