= Between Two Worlds: Escape from Tyranny: Growing Up in the Shadow of Saddam =

2005 memoir by Zainab Salbi

- Author: Zainab Salbi
- Genre: Non-fiction
- Publisher: Gotham Books
- Publication date: 2005
- Pages: 272
- ISBN: 978-1-59240-156-7

Between Two Worlds: Escape from Tyranny: Growing Up in the Shadow of Saddam is a 2005 memoir by Zainab Salbi.

The book documents Salbi's childhood in Baghdad, Iraq where her father was the private pilot for president Saddam Hussein. It was praised for giving readers insight into the character of Saddam.

== Publication ==
Between Two Worlds in an autobiography, written by Iraqi-American author Zainab Salbi with help from journalist Laurie Becklund, and published in 2005. It has eleven chapters and 272 pages and was published by Gotham Books.

== Synopsis ==
The autobiographical book tells the story of how the author's parents were "complicit in their own oppression." Most of the book is set in Baghdad, Iraq and covers the period of the Zainab Salbi's childhood. When the author is eleven years old her father becomes the private pilot of Saddam Hussein, who becomes a family friend. In order to protect her from Hussein, at the age of 19, Salbi has an arranged marriage and is sent to the United States. Her Iraqi-American husband turns out to be abusive and she escapes him and founds Women for Women International organisation. Even in the US, Hussein's influence prevents her from speaking about the Iraqi people's suffering.

== Critical reception ==
Publishers Weekly praised the book for giving the reader an accurate insight into the inner circle of Saddam Hussein.

Sadiq Alkoriji, writing in Library Journal, described the book's observations on Hussein's character as "very important" and the author's description of Hussein as vivid.

== See also ==
- MeToo, Now What? (television show hosted by the author)
