= The Canon (podcast) =

Film podcast

- Genre: Film
- Language: English

Cast and voices
- Hosted by: Devin Faraci (2014–2016); Amy Nicholson

Production
- Length: 40–90 minutes

Publication
- No. of episodes: 163
- Original release: November 3, 2014 – July 16, 2018
- Provider: Earwolf
- Updates: Weekly

Related
- Website: www.earwolf.com/show/the-canon/

The Canon was a weekly audio podcast on Earwolf which began airing on November 3, 2014 and ended on July 16, 2018. Each week, Devin Faraci and Amy Nicholson, of MTV News, discussed films they believed to be worthy of The Canon. The Canon is a list of films that the audience votes to decide whether it is one of "the greatest films of all time", similar to the Western canon. Some episodes compare two films head-to-head.

Due to an allegation brought against Faraci of sexual assault, Nicholson and Earwolf mutually agreed to put the podcast on an indefinite hiatus. Nicholson appeared on an episode of fellow Earwolf podcast Denzel Washington Is The Greatest Actor of All Time Period and confirmed that she would be bringing back The Canon in "early spring" 2017. In an announcement on April 10, 2017, Amy said Devin "won't be coming back for this version" but that "when and if he is ready to come back, the door is open." The Canon returned on April 17, 2017, featuring Nicholson and a different co-host for every episode.

== Format ==
At the beginning of the podcast, Devin Faraci and Amy Nicholson tell whether last week's film was voted to be added to The Canon. They then introduce the film of the week, typically with some background information and a brief bit on the film. For the rest of the podcast, Devin and Amy discuss whether the film should be in The Canon; typically, the hosts pick opposite positions on its being added. After the podcast, listeners can go and vote on the film's being included in The Canon, on The Canon forum.

== Episodes ==
#	Date	Guests	Movie(s)	In the Canon	Description	Ref
1	November 4, 2014	n/a	Goodfellas	Yes		
2	November 14, 2014	n/a	Indiana Jones and the Temple of Doom	No		
3	November 17, 2014	n/a	Romeo + Juliet	No		
4	November 24, 2014	n/a	Jerry Maguire	No		
5	December 1, 2014	n/a	Star Wars vs.	Yes		
5	December 1, 2014	n/a	The Empire Strikes Back	No (Note: Was considered to be added in to The Canon in episode 50 after initial rejection, rejected again. According to hosts to be its last chance.)		
6	December 8, 2014	n/a	Inception	No		
7	December 15, 2014	n/a	The Lion King vs.	No		
7	December 15, 2014	n/a	Beauty and the Beast (1991)	Yes		
8	December 22, 2014	n/a	It's A Wonderful Life	Yes		
9 (Note: The first episode to not have the either of the movies nominated in the title, focusing on the best films of the year instead.)	December 29, 2014	n/a	The Grand Budapest Hotel vs.	Yes		
9	December 29, 2014	n/a	Guardians of the Galaxy	No		
10	January 5, 2015	n/a	The 400 Blows	Yes		
11	January 12, 2015	n/a	Forrest Gump	No		
12	January 19, 2015	n/a	The Shawshank Redemption	No		
13	February 9, 2015	n/a	Clerks	Yes		
14	February 16, 2015	n/a	E.T. vs.	Yes		
14	February 16, 2015	n/a	Close Encounters of the Third Kind	No		
15	February 23, 2015	Jeremy Smith	Blow Out	Yes		
16	March 2, 2015	n/a	Blade Runner	Yes		
17	March 9, 2015	Amber Benson	The Nights of Cabiria	Yes		
18	March 16, 2015	n/a	There's Something About Mary	Yes		
19	March 23, 2015	Matt Gourley	Casino Royale (2006)	Yes		
20	March 30, 2015	Kumail Nanjiani	Alien vs.	Yes		
20	March 30, 2015	Kumail Nanjiani	Aliens	No		
21	April 6, 2015	n/a	The Rocky Horror Picture Show	Yes		
22	April 13, 2015	n/a	Annie Hall vs.	Yes		
22	April 13, 2015	n/a	Manhattan	No		
23	April 20, 2015	Karina Longworth	The Godfather	Yes		
23	April 20, 2015	Karina Longworth	The Godfather Part II	Yes		
23	April 20, 2015	Karina Longworth	The Godfather Part III	No		
24	April 27, 2015	n/a	Saturday Night Fever	Yes		
25	May 4, 2015	n/a	Pretty In Pink	No		
26	May 11, 2015	Joe Lynch	Evil Dead II	Yes		
27	May 18, 2015	n/a	The Sound of Music	No		
28	May 25, 2015	n/a	Mad Max: Fury Road vs.	Yes		
28	May 25, 2015	n/a	Mad Max 2: The Road Warrior	No		
29	June 1, 2015	n/a	Do the Right Thing	Yes		
30	June 8, 2015	n/a	King Kong (1933) vs.	Yes		
30	June 8, 2015	n/a	Jurassic Park	No (Note: Is the only current movie to be initially rejected and later added into The Canon in episode 50.)		
31	June 15, 2015	Noah Segan	Two-Lane Blacktop	Yes		
32	June 22, 2015	n/a	All About Eve	Yes		
33	June 29, 2015	n/a	Animal House vs.	Yes		
33	June 29, 2015	n/a	Revenge of the Nerds	No		
34	July 6, 2015	n/a	Battle Royale	Yes		
35	July 27, 2015	n/a	Double Indemnity	Yes		
36	August 3, 2015	n/a	Mission: Impossible	No		
37	August 10, 2015	Bobcat Goldthwait; Barry Crimmins	The Candidate	Yes		
38	August 17, 2015	n/a	Reservoir Dogs	Yes		
39	August 24, 2015	Sasha Stone	The Hurt Locker	No		
40	August 31, 2015	n/a	Let the Right One In vs.	Yes		
40	August 31, 2015	n/a	Let Me In	No		
41	September 7, 2015	n/a	Freaks	Yes		
42	September 15, 2015	n/a	Waltz with Bashir	Yes		
43	September 21, 2015	n/a	The Searchers	Yes		
44	September 28, 2015	n/a	The Fly (1986) vs.	No		
44	September 28, 2015	n/a	The Thing (1982)	Yes		
45	October 5, 2015	n/a	Sunrise	Yes		
46	October 12, 2015	n/a	Pan's Labyrinth	Yes		
47	October 19, 2015	Jake Fogelnest	Fast Times at Ridgemont High	Yes		
48	October 26, 2015	Sam Zimmerman	Cannibal Holocaust	Yes		
49	November 2, 2015	Peyton Reed; Dana Gould	Planet of the Apes	Yes		
50	November 9, 2015	n/a	The Empire Strikes Back vs.	No	Rematch of two previous vote losers	
50	November 9, 2015	n/a	Jurassic Park	Yes (Note: The only film so far to not be decided by the audience, instead was decided by Elijah Wood in Episode 51.)	Rematch of two previous vote losers	
51	November 16, 2015	Elijah Wood	The Goonies	No		
52	November 23, 2015	n/a	Rocky	Yes		
52	November 23, 2015	n/a	First Blood	No		
53	November 30, 2015	n/a	American Beauty	No		
54	December 7, 2015	n/a	Rebel Without a Cause	Yes		
55	December 15, 2015	n/a	The Decline of Western Civilization vs.	No		
55	December 15, 2015	n/a	The Decline of Western Civilization Part II: The Metal Years	Yes		
56	December 21, 2015	Henry Rollins	Apocalypse Now	Yes		
57	December 28, 2015		Creed vs.	No	Best of 2015	
57	December 28, 2015		Chi-Raq	Yes	Best of 2015	
58	January 4, 2016	n/a	Gunga Din	Yes		
59	January 11, 2016	n/a	Sex, Lies, and Videotape	Yes		
60	January 18, 2016	n/a	The Getaway (1972) vs.	No		
60	January 18, 2016	n/a	The Wild Bunch	Yes		
61	January 25, 2016	n/a	Working Girl	Yes		
62	February 1, 2016	n/a	Oldboy (2003)	Yes		
63	February 8, 2016	n/a	O Brother, Where Art Thou?	Yes		
64	February 15, 2016	n/a	Broadcast News	No		
65	February 22, 2016	Paul Rust	Election	Yes		
66	February 28, 2016	n/a	Fail Safe	Yes		
67	March 7, 2016	n/a	Lolita (1962)	No		
68	March 14, 2016	Michael Lerman	Antichrist	Yes		
69	March 21, 2016	n/a	The Passion of the Christ vs.	No		
69	March 21, 2016	n/a	The Last Temptation of Christ	Yes		
70	March 28, 2016	n/a	Batman vs.	No		
70	March 28, 2016	n/a	Superman	Yes		
71	April 4, 2016	n/a	Slacker	Yes		
72	April 11, 2016	Bryan Cogman	The Adventures of Robin Hood	Yes		
73	April 18, 2016	n/a	The Lost Weekend	No		
74	April 25, 2016	n/a	Pather Panchali	Yes		
75	May 2, 2016	n/a	Brokeback Mountain	Yes		
76	May 9, 2016	n/a	Marathon Man	Yes		
77	May 16, 2016	n/a	Se7en	Yes		
78	May 23, 2016	n/a	Boyz n the Hood	Yes		
79	May 30, 2016	n/a	The Usual Suspects	Yes		
80	June 11, 2016	n/a	Gentlemen Prefer Blondes vs.	No		
80	June 11, 2016	n/a	Some Like It Hot	Yes		
81	June 13, 2016	Jonah Ray	Ed Wood	Yes		
82	June 20, 2016	n/a	They Live	Yes		
83	June 27, 2016	Film Crit Hulk	Kiki's Delivery Service	Yes		
84	July 4, 2016	n/a	Re-Animator	Yes		
85	July 11, 2016	n/a	Boogie Nights vs.	No		
85	July 11, 2016	n/a	There Will Be Blood	Yes		
86	July 18, 2016	n/a	Breakfast at Tiffany's	Yes		
87	August 1, 2016	n/a	The General	Yes		
88	August 8, 2016	n/a	A Hard Day's Night	Yes		
89	August 15, 2016	n/a	Blazing Saddles	Yes		
90	August 22, 2016	n/a	Pennies from Heaven	Yes		
91	August 29, 2016	n/a	Labyrinth	No		
92	September 5, 2016	n/a	Stand By Me	Yes		
93	September 12, 2016	Simon Barrett	The Blair Witch Project	Yes		
94	September 19, 2016	n/a	The King of Comedy	Yes		
95	September 26, 2016	Dave Schilling	Star Trek II: The Wrath of Khan	Yes		
96	October 3, 2016	Eva Faye Anderson	The Bad Seed	Yes		
97	October 9, 2016	n/a	A Face in the Crowd	Yes		
98	April 17, 2017	Paul Scheer	Ghostbusters	Yes		
99	April 25, 2017	Armond White	Sign o' the Times vs.	No		
99	April 25, 2017	Armond White	Stop Making Sense	Yes		
100	May 1, 2017	Franklin Leonard; Kate Hagen	Juno vs.	Yes		
100	May 1, 2017	Franklin Leonard; Kate Hagen	Whiplash	No		
101	May 8, 2017	David Ehrlich	Shakespeare in Love	No		
102	May 15, 2017	Joanna Robinson; David Chen	The Lord of the Rings: The Fellowship of the Ring vs.	Yes		
102	May 15, 2017	Joanna Robinson; David Chen	The Lord of the Rings: The Return of the King	No		
103	May 22, 2017	Pat Healy	Where the Sidewalk Ends	No		
104	May 29, 2017	Jake Fogelnest	Female Trouble	Yes		
105	June 5, 2017	Michael Nordine	Eraserhead vs.	No		
105	June 5, 2017	Michael Nordine	Blue Velvet	Yes		
106	June 12, 2017	Heather Matarazzo	Fatal Attraction	No		
107	June 19, 2017	Justin Chang	Black Orpheus vs.	Yes		
107	June 19, 2017	Justin Chang	City of God	No		
108	June 26, 2017	Edgar Wright	The Driver	Yes		
109	July 3, 2017	Ira Madison III	Raising Arizona	Yes		
110	July 10, 2017	Richard Lawson	Z	Yes		
111	July 17, 2017	Stephanie Zacharek	Lost in Translation vs.	Yes		
111	July 17, 2017	Stephanie Zacharek	Marie Antoinette	No		
112	July 24, 2017	Bryan Cogman	Footlight Parade	Yes		
113	July 31, 2017	Seth Stevenson	Putney Swope	No		
114	August 7, 2017	Alan Scherstuhl	9 to 5 vs.	Yes		
114	August 7, 2017	Alan Scherstuhl	The Best Little Whorehouse in Texas	No		
115	August 14, 2017	Carina Chocano	The Stepford Wives	Yes		
116	August 21, 2017	Matt Zoller-Seitz	Seconds	Yes		
117	August 28, 2017	Tom Reimann & Abe Epperson	Top Gun vs.	Yes		
117	August 28, 2017	Tom Reimann & Abe Epperson	Minority Report	No		
118	September 4, 2017	Jason Zinoman	Real Life	Yes		
119	September 11, 2017	Ben Westhoff	Friday	Yes		
120	September 18, 2017	Alison Willmore	Last Tango in Paris	No		
121	September 25, 2017	Cameron Esposito	The Matrix	Yes		
122	October 2, 2017	Witney Seibold	The Tingler	No		
123	October 9, 2017	Adam Egypt Mortimer	Martyrs	Yes		
124	October 16, 2017	Roxanne Benjamin	Suspiria	Yes		
125	October 23, 2017	Owen Shiflett	The Host	No		
126	October 30, 2017	Kier-La Janisse	The Brood	Yes		
127	November 6, 2015	Evan Dickson	Back to the Future	Yes		
127	November 6, 2015	Evan Dickson	Back to the Future Part II	No		
127	November 6, 2015	Evan Dickson	Back to the Future Part III	No		
128	November 13, 2017	Jordan Hoffman	Starship Troopers	Yes		
129	November 20, 2017	Brett Morgen	Fast, Cheap & Out of Control	Yes		
130	November 27, 2017	Paul Scheer	The Room	Yes		
131	December 4, 2017	Chris Klimek	The Philadelphia Story vs.	Yes		
131	December 4, 2017	Chris Klimek	His Girl Friday	No		
132	December 11, 2017	Molly Lambert	Carnal Knowledge	No		
133	December 18, 2017	April Wolfe	American Psycho	Yes		
134	December 25, 2017	Michael H. Weber	Love Actually	No		
135	January 1, 2018	Graham Skipper	Monty Python and the Holy Grail vs.	Yes		
135	January 1, 2018	Graham Skipper	Monty Python's Life of Brian	No		
136	January 8, 2018	Engineer Sam (call-in show)	The Florida Project vs.	No	Best of 2017	
136	January 8, 2018	Engineer Sam (call-in show)	Get Out vs.	Yes	Best of 2017	
136	January 8, 2018	Engineer Sam (call-in show)	Lady Bird vs.	No	Best of 2017	
136	January 8, 2018	Engineer Sam (call-in show)	mother! vs.	No (Note: This episode featured the first appearance from former co-host Devin Faraci since he left the show in the form of a call in to throw his support to mother! as well as the show in its current form.)	Best of 2017	
136	January 8, 2018	Engineer Sam (call-in show)	Star Wars: The Last Jedi	No	Best of 2017	
137	January 15, 2018	David Scarpa	The Hustler	Yes		
138	January 22, 2018	Nate DiMeo	Being There vs.	No		
138	January 22, 2018	Nate DiMeo	Harold and Maude	Yes		
139	January 29, 2018	David Nadelberg	The Neverending Story	No		
140	February 5, 2018	Russ Fischer	My Fair Lady vs.	No	Oscar Best Picture nominee rematches	
140	February 5, 2018	Russ Fischer	Mary Poppins	Yes	Oscar Best Picture nominee rematches	
141	February 12, 2018	Russ Fischer	Midnight Cowboy vs.	Yes	Oscar Best Picture nominee rematches	
141	February 12, 2018	Russ Fischer	Butch Cassidy and the Sundance Kid	No	Oscar Best Picture nominee rematches	
142	February 19, 2018	Russ Fischer	Driving Miss Daisy vs.	No	Oscar Best Picture nominee rematches	
142	February 19, 2018	Russ Fischer	Field of Dreams	Yes	Oscar Best Picture nominee rematches	
143	February 26, 2018	Russ Fischer	Gladiator vs.	No	Oscar Best Picture nominee rematches	
143	February 26, 2018	Russ Fischer	Crouching Tiger, Hidden Dragon	Yes	Oscar Best Picture nominee rematches	
144	March 5, 2018	Ruben Östlund	Fat Girl	Yes		
145	March 12, 2018	Dallas Sonnier	The Lost Boys	No		
146	March 19, 2018	Emily Yoshida	Punch-Drunk Love	Yes		
147	March 26, 2018	Jen Yamato	The Umbrellas of Cherbourg	Yes		
148	April 2, 2018	Andrew Barker	Point Break	No		
149	April 9, 2018	Marc Bernardin	Boomerang	No		
150	April 16, 2018	Jenelle Riley	The Avengers	Yes		
151	April 23, 2018	Thomas Lennon	The Exorcist vs.	Yes	Live from the Overlook Film Festival (nominations not announced in advance)	
151	April 23, 2018	Thomas Lennon	The Exorcist III	No	Live from the Overlook Film Festival (nominations not announced in advance)	
152	April 30, 2018	Christy Lemire	The Breakfast Club	Yes		
153	May 7, 2018	Lloyd Kaufman	Cry Uncle!	No		
154	May 14, 2018	Andrew Ti	Infernal Affairs vs.	Yes		
154	May 14, 2018	Andrew Ti	The Departed	No		
155	May 21, 2018	Larry Karaszewski	The Fountainhead	No		
156	May 28, 2018	Kendra Jones	Legends of the Fall	No		
157	June 4, 2018	Adam Egypt Mortimer	Grease vs.	No		
157	June 4, 2018	Adam Egypt Mortimer	Hairspray	Yes		
158	June 11, 2018	Tom Bissell	The Talented Mr. Ripley	Yes		
159	June 18, 2018	Alex Schmidt	Caddyshack	No		
160	June 25, 2018	David Fear	Tommy	Yes		
161	July 2, 2018	Alissa Wilkinson	Grey Gardens	Yes		
162	July 8, 2018	Benjamin Lee	Scream	Yes		
163	July 16, 2018	Engineer Sam (call-in show)	Zodiac vs.	No	Listener nominated season finale	
163	July 16, 2018	Engineer Sam (call-in show)	Magnolia vs.	No	Listener nominated season finale	
163	July 16, 2018	Engineer Sam (call-in show)	Shaun of the Dead	Yes	Listener nominated season finale	
