= Devin Faraci =

American film critic, blogger, podcaster and writer

- Born: United States
- Occupations: Film critic, writer, blogger, podcaster
- Spouse: Brittany Knupper (m. 2023; died 2023)

Devin Faraci is an American film critic, blogger, podcaster, writer and former editor-in-chief of the film website Birth.Movies.Death., previously known as Badass Digest, and published by Alamo Drafthouse. Faraci got his start writing for CHUD.com, he left in 2010 to form Birth.Movies.Death. with financing from Alamo Drafthouse.

In 2014, Faraci and film critic Amy Nicholson hosted a weekly audio podcast on Earwolf called The Canon. Faraci has been featured in such films as Dylan Dog: Dead of Night Jodorowsky's Dune and Heckler.

== Controversy ==
Faraci stepped down as the head of Birth.Movies.Death. after being accused of sexual assault in 2016. In 2017, Faraci was fired for a second time by Alamo Drafthouse after it was revealed that CEO Tim League quietly rehired Faraci as a copywriter 10 months after the sexual assault allegations. Faraci later said he felt suicidal after the assault charges were made. Faraci was interviewed about his sexual assault charges for the 2018 PBS television series MeToo, Now What? about the MeToo movement.

== Later life ==
In February 2018, Faraci revealed the start of a new cinematic website, Cinema Sangha, described as "film from an occasionally Buddhist perspective." Faraci also hosts the podcast Marvelvision.

== Personal life ==
In 2023, Faraci wrote an op-ed for The Washington Post about how his life had been affected by his wife Brittany Knupper's cancer diagnosis.
