= Earwolf =

American podcasting network

Earwolf Media, LLC
- Trade name: Earwolf
- Type: Subsidiary
- Industry: Podcasting
- Founded: August 2010
- Founders: Jeff Ullrich; Scott Aukerman
- Defunct: September 1, 2025
- Headquarters: Los Angeles, California, U.S.
- Area served: Worldwide
- Key people: Erik Diehn (CEO); Sarah van Mosel (Chief revenue officer); Scott Aukerman (CCO)
- Products: Comedy Bang! Bang! Conan O'Brien Needs a Friend; Kevin Pollak's Chat Show; How Did This Get Made?
- Number of employees: 21
- Parent: SiriusXM
- Website: www.earwolf.com

Earwolf was an American comedy podcasting network founded by Scott Aukerman and Jeff Ullrich in August 2010. Initially built around the Comedy Death-Ray Radio podcast, the network grew to include many podcasts on diverse subjects. The Earwolf studios were in Los Angeles, California, United States.

In November 2014, Earwolf launched a sister network, Wolfpop, led by Paul Scheer. In March 2016, most of Wolfpop's programs were merged into Earwolf.

Howl was a podcasting app launched in 2015 by Midroll Media, whose premium version featured the entire back catalogue of Earwolf podcasts, along with several comedy specials and many limited-run podcasts. Howl was discontinued in 2019, with its programming made available on Stitcher Premium, until it too was discontinued in 2023.

Following the acquisition of Midroll Media by SiriusXM in July 2020, Earwolf slowly began dropping shows from its lineup, with podcasts like Hollywood Handbook and Office Ladies moving to other networks. In September 2025, Earwolf's four remaining podcasts, Comedy Bang! Bang!, How Did This Get Made?, Conan O'Brien Needs a Friend, and Scam Goddess, dropped the Earwolf branding in favor of SiriusXM branding, with the website becoming dormant.

== History ==
Earwolf podcasting network was founded by Scott Aukerman and Jeff Ullrich in August 2010. In 2011, they announced a partnership with Funny Or Die.

In 2014, Earwolf merged with podcast advertising network The Mid Roll, a separate company founded by Ullrich, to form Midroll Media. Midroll was acquired by the E. W. Scripps Company in 2015.

In July 2020, SiriusXM acquired Midroll Media, which includes Stitcher Radio and Earwolf, for $325 million.

=== Wolfpop ===
In November 2014, Earwolf launched a sister network, Wolfpop, led by Paul Scheer. Wolfpop's podcast lineup included The Black List Table Reads, The Canon, Cardboard! With Rich Sommer, Crybabies, Denzel Washington Is the Greatest Actor of All Time Period, Get Up on This, Happy Sad Confused, I Was There Too, Maltin on Movies, Nerd Machine's Picking Favorites, Off Camera, OMFG!, Reading Aloud, Rotten Tomatoes, and The Sylvester Stallone Show. On March 7, 2016, the majority of Wolfpop's programs were folded over into Earwolf.

=== Howl ===
Howl was a podcasting app launched by Midroll Media in 2015. The premium version of the app featured the entire back catalogues of Earwolf podcasts, as well as several comedy specials and all episodes of WTF with Marc Maron. Howl also featured many limited-run podcasts exclusive to the premium version of the app, including Atlas Obscura Day, I Know It Sounds Crazy, Colt Cabana Presents: The Gathering of the Juggalos, Good Question, Hardcore Game of Thrones, Psychic Pshow with Lauren Lapkus, Spalding Gray: Great Live Performances, Superego: Forgotten Classics, The Complete Woman, The Mysterious Secrets Of Uncle Bertie's Botanarium, What's Wrong With Me?, Wild Horses: The Perspective, and Words of the Years. In 2019, Howl was discontinued, its programming still being available on Stitcher Premium.

== Location ==
The Earwolf studios were in Los Angeles, California, United States.

== Comedy programming ==
Bitch Sesh: A Real Housewives Breakdown

A podcast where Casey Wilson and Danielle Schneider discuss shows from The Real Housewives franchise. They often have special guests, who have previously included Andy Cohen, June Diane Raphael, Michael Rapaport, Adam Pally, and Retta.

Comedy Bang! Bang!: The Podcast

Comedy Bang! Bang! (previously Comedy Death-Ray Radio) is Earwolf's flagship podcast. It is hosted by Scott Aukerman and was originally an extension of his weekly live Comedy Death-Ray show. The weekly podcast features guests from the world of comedy, including Paul F. Tompkins, James Adomian, Tim Heidecker, Bob Odenkirk, and others. The show is known for improvised conversations between Aukerman and his guests, some of whom perform impressions or original characters. The show celebrated its second anniversary during its May 2 show and changed its name to Comedy Bang Bang: The Podcast. The A.V. Club listed the show as one of the top comedy podcasts of 2010.

In 2012, IFC began airing a television version of the show, called Comedy Bang! Bang! The first season ran for ten episodes, it was renewed for a 20 episode second season, and began airing its third season in May 2014. IFC picked up the show for a 40 episode fourth season on March 20, 2014. The series lasted for a total of five seasons.

Conan O'Brien Needs a Friend

Launched in 2018, Conan O'Brien Needs a Friend is a podcast in which retired late-night television host Conan O'Brien hangs out with "people he enjoys most" and tries to find "real friendship" along the way.

Earwolf Presents

Earwolf Presents showcases new podcasts from Earwolf as well as one-off specials.

How Did This Get Made?

How Did This Get Made?, hosted by Paul Scheer, June Diane Raphael and Jason Mantzoukas, is a biweekly podcast. Each show, which has a new guest, features the deconstruction and mockery of terrible films. Not only are jokes made, but attempts to unscramble plots are often begun before being abandoned. During the show's off week a ".5" episode is uploaded featuring Scheer announcing the next week's movie as well as challenges for the fans.

improv4humans with Matt Besser

An improvised podcast led by Matt Besser, a founding member of the Upright Citizens Brigade. Besser and various improvisers use one-word suggestions from Twitter, listener calls, videos from YouTube, and occasional musical guests as basis for improvised scenes. Musical acts that have appeared on the podcast have included Frank Turner, Dan Deacon, Lucero, The Staves, The Family Crest, and more.

Scam Goddess

Host Laci Mosley and guests discuss scams, cons, robbery, and fraud. Topics have included Caroline Calloway, Fyre Fest, and Don Larpe.

The Neighborhood Listen

An improvised podcast hosted by Paul F. Tompkins and Nicole Parker, in the characters of Burnt Millipede and Joan Pedestrian, citizens of the fictional town of Dignity Falls. In each episode improvised comedy occurs based on posts from the neighborhood-based social network Nextdoor. Guests such as Maria Blasucci, Ryan Gaul, Nicole Byer, and Bobby Moynihan have all appeared as characters.

U Talkin' U2 To Me? / R U Talkin' R.E.M. RE: ME? / U Talkin' Talking Heads 2 My Talking Head? / U Springin' Springsteen On My Bean?

The U Talkin' series features Scott Aukerman and Adam Scott discussing their mutual admiration for an artist, discussing one album per episode. The podcast started as U Talkin' U2 to Me on February 26, 2014. Guests included Harris Wittels, Lance Bangs, Paul F. Tompkins, Jimmy Pardo, Todd Glass, Doug Benson, U2, Phoebe Robinson, and Andy Daly. In 2018, the podcast was rebranded as R U Talkin' R.E.M. RE: ME?, discussing the band R.E.M. In 2020, the podcast was again rebranded as R U Talkin' RHCP RE: ME?, discussing the band Red Hot Chili Peppers for one episode, where in the second episode it was discussed that both hosts would much rather do a show about Talking Heads and was rebranded yet again as U Talkin' Talking Heads 2 My Talking Head? In 2023 the podcast began discussing Bruce Springsteen under the title U Springin' Springsteen On My Bean?

== Lifestyle programming ==
Wrong Turns with Jameela Jamil

Formerly known as I Weigh with Jameela Jamil when it was a body-positive podcast where host Jameela Jamil interviews guests about identity and body image. Guests have included Billy Porter, Reese Witherspoon, and iO Tillett Wright.

== Culture programming ==
Unspooled

Unspooled is a film podcast co-hosted by Amy Nicholson and Paul Scheer. Season 1 explores the AFI Top 100 while season 2 explores Scheer and Nicholson's top 100 films.

== Former programming ==
Affirmation Nation with Bob Ducca

A self-improvement podcast hosted by Seth Morris as his character Bob Ducca.

Analyze Phish

On Analyze Phish, Harris Wittels attempted to convince Scott Aukerman to like the band Phish. The first episode aired in August 2011. Ten episodes aired, with the final installment, "Fuego," posted on July 10, 2014.

The Andy Daly Podcast Pilot Project

A podcast where Andy Daly and Matt Gourley sort through various podcast pilots that have been sent to Earwolf.

The Apple Sisters

A mostly scripted podcast featuring The Apple Sisters. The show features original songs and stars three singing sisters who set their act in 1943.

Attitudes!

In Attitudes!, formerly known as Throwing Shade, hosts Erin Gibson and Bryan Safi discuss issues concerning women's rights, LGBTQ rights and progressive politics laced with humor. They also consider important issues like grocery shopping, cotton candy grapes, annoying neighbors, and skin care.

Beautiful/Anonymous

A podcast officially known as Beautiful Stories from Anonymous People where Chris Gethard speaks on the phone to anonymous people. The callers can hang up at any time, but Gethard must stay on the line with them for at least an hour. In August 2023, Beautiful/Anonymous left Earwolf and went independent after over seven years with the network.

Best Friends with Nicole Byer and Sasheer Zamata

Comedians Nicole Byer and Sasheer Zamata discuss friendship, culture, and life. While the show continues, the show is now produced by Headgum as of 2025, having left Earwolf.

Big Grande Teachers' Lounge

Big Grande Teachers Lounge ran from September 2017 to June 2020 and featured Drew Tarver, Dan Lippert, Jon Mackey, and Ryan Rosenberg as bumbling teachers at the fictional Hamilton High School.

The Black List Table Reads

A podcast where The Black List founder Franklin Leonard presents unproduced scripts read by a rotating group of actors.

Bonanas for Bonanza

Launched in April 2020, Bonanas for Bonanza is the first podcast picked up by Earwolf from The Andy Daly Podcast Pilot Project. Hosts Dalton Wilcox (Andy Daly), Amy Sleeverson (Maria Bamford), and Mutt Taylor (Matt Gourley) watch the television show Bonanza.

By the Way, In Conversation with Jeff Garlin

A live podcast recorded at Largo in LA, featuring a casual conversation between a guest and Jeff Garlin. Guests have included JJ Abrams, Henry Rollins, Lena Dunham, Will Ferrell, Zach Galifianakis and Larry David.

The Canon

In The Canon, Amy Nicholson and a different co-host (formerly Devin Faraci) discuss a new movie every week and whether it deserves to be "canon," though the final decision is left to listeners' votes.

The Cracked Podcast

Hosted by Alex Schmidt, The Cracked Podcast is an extension of the discussions that drive articles published on the website Cracked.

Crybabies

A podcast where Sarah Thyre, Susan Orlean, and a guest discuss what makes them cry.

Culture Kings

Comedians Jacquis Neal and Edgar Momplaisir discuss blackness and popular culture. The podcast of was previously part of the iHeart Radio network but moved to Earwolf in January 2020.

Cyber Thug Radio

Cyber Thug Radio was a part of Earwolf for two weeks before being discontinued. It was hosted by Jerry Minor (as "Cyber Thug") with co-host "Miles Archer". Together they talked about hip-hop, athletics, and other urban topics. It launched in November 2010 and was formally announced canceled on December 28, 2010. The Earwolf store released a special third episode in March 2012.

The David Gregory Show

An interview podcast hosted by David Gregory.

Denzel Washington Is the Greatest Actor of All Time Period

A podcast where W. Kamau Bell and Kevin Avery discuss a new movie starring Denzel Washington each week.

Doing Great with Vicky Vox

Drag queen Vicky Vox interviews guests using tarot cards. Guests have included Detox, Alaska Thunderfuck, Bob the Drag Queen, and Betsy Sodaro.

Dr. Gameshow

A podcast where Jo Firestone and Manolo Moreno play listener-submitted games with comedian friends and listener call-ins. The podcast was on Earwolf from 2017 to 2018, but now can be found on Maximum Fun.

Eardrop

On March 14, 2011, Earwolf premiered Eardrop. Calling it an "Audio Twitter", Eardrop features a collection of comedians calling and leaving messages to an Earwolf answering machine, and those message then being played with sound effects between.

Earwolf Challenge

Billed as "America's first reality podcast", the Earwolf Challenge premiered July 11, 2011, and follows ten podcasts through a reality television-style elimination competition to win a year-long contract with Earwolf. The show is hosted by Matt Besser. It was won by the Totally Laime podcast, hosted by the Los Angeles–based husband and wife duo of Elizabeth Laime and Andy Rosen. After attracting few listeners, Earwolf Challenge is not returning for a second season.

Factually! with Adam Conover

Comedian Adam Conover of Adam Ruins Everything and The G Word, interviews experts on science, politics, and current events.

Fake the Nation

A podcast where Negin Farsad discusses politics with her funny friends.

The Fogelnest Files

Jake Fogelnest brings on a guest to discuss YouTube videos.

Full Release with Samantha Bee

Full Frontal host Samantha Bee speaks with journalists and experts about current events and issues. Guests have included Jelani Cobb, Soledad O'Brien, and Dr. Jen Gunter.

Get Up On This

Get Up On This was a podcast that ran from November 2014 to February 2019, Jensen Karp and Matthew Robinson introduced listeners to TV shows, musicians, and other things they should be familiar with. Ali Segel and Erin Mallory Long took over as hosts of Get Up On This 2.0 in November 2019.

Getting Curious with Jonathan Van Ness

Jonathan Van Ness's podcast to discuss timely cultural topics with special guests such as Melinda Gates, Reese Witherspoon and Katie Couric, as well as Jonathan's co-hosts from Queer Eye.

Glitter in the Garbage with Drew Droege

Hosted by Drew Droege of Planet Unicorn and launched on December 7, 2010, Glitter in the Garbage is "a celebration of all thing fancy" that takes the shape of improvised sketches and monologues with Droege and his guests playing "obscure celebrities who celebrate, fight, feast upon, and polish the filth." Notable guests have included Saturday Night Live alums Melanie Hutsell, Michaela Watkins, and Casey Wilson; comedians James Adomian, June Diane Raphael and Groundlings member Stephanie Courtney who is best known for playing Flo in the Progressive Insurance commercials.

Happy Sad Confused

An interview podcast where Josh Horowitz has conversations with actors and filmmakers.

Hard Nation

A politics-themed comedy podcast hosted by Mike Still and Paul Welsh featuring comedians impersonating famous politicians. Splitsider called Hard Nation the "Best Political Comedy Podcast" of the 2016 U.S. presidential election. The show came to an end in March 2018, under the narrative auspices that Jeff Foxworthy had purchased their fictional radio station.

Hello From The Magic Tavern

Featuring Adal Rifai, Arnie Niekamp, and Matt Young, Hello From The Magic Tavern follows the story of Arnie Niekamp, who falls through a dimensional portal into the magical land of Foon. He uploads a podcast each week from the land's tavern the Vermilion Minotaur.

History: The Shequel

Host Erin Gibson "is joined each week by a cool teen" to discuss women's history. Subjects have included Ida B. Wells, March Fong Eu, and Deborah Sampson.

Hollywood Handbook

Hollywood Handbook is a podcast about learning and growing and having fun with your friends, hosted by comedian/writer duo The Boys, which consists of Hayes Davenport and Sean Clements. The show is supposed to mimic and mock reality programs that deal with trivial celebrity gossip and making it in Hollywood. The hosts go on long tangential riffs about show-biz and Hollywood. Each week they have a guest for an interview, preceding the interview there are comedy segments in which Davenport and Clements discuss different things in their highly satirical fashion. Guests have included Donald Glover, Ellie Kemper, Aubrey Plaza, Kumail Nanjiani, Nick Kroll, Pauly Shore, and Sharon Horgan.

Homophilia

A podcast where Dave Holmes and Matt McConkey interview LGBT celebrities.

The Hooray Show with Horatio

A podcast featuring sketches and interviews with host Horatio Sanz. The Hooray Show left Earwolf after 26 episodes.

How To Be Less Old

In How To Be Less Old (formerly OMFG!), Emily Foster and Deanna Cheng educate themselves and others on youth culture.

I Was There Too

A podcast where Matt Gourley interviews people involved with some of the most famous movies and TV shows of all time.

In Bed With Nick and Megan

A podcast hosted by Nick Offerman and Megan Mullally, who record the podcast from their own bed and interview friends and celebrities while also discussing their careers and personal lives. It debuted in November 2019 and guests have included Retta, Lisa Kudrow, Bill Hader and Will Forte.

Inside Conan: An Important Hollywood Podcast

Late Night with Conan O'Brien writers Mike Sweeney and Jessie Gaskell offer a behind the scenes look at production on Late Night.

James Bonding

A podcast where Matt Gourley and Matt Mira discuss the James Bond film series. The show has been on hiatus since January 2020.

Katie Couric

An interview podcast hosted by Katie Couric.

Kevin Pollak's Chat Show

Long-form interviews with luminaries from the worlds of comedy, film, and television, hosted by actor/comedian Kevin Pollak.

Kondabolu Brothers

In Kondabolu Brothers, Ashok and Hari Kondabolu discuss cultural matters and pop culture.

The Longest Shortest Time

The Longest Shortest Time is a parenting podcast hosted by Hillary Frank.

Love, Dad

A parenting podcast hosted by Earwolf founder Jeff Ullrich and comedian/actor David Koechner.

Maltin On Movies

A podcast where Leonard Maltin and Baron Vaughn discuss films on a different theme each week. In July 2016, Maltin On Movies moved to Nerdist.

Mike Detective

A send up of hardboiled detective stories starring Rob Huebel as the metaphor spouting title character, Grey DeLisle as Stephanie Client and featuring Neil Campbell as the announcer. After premiering as a backdoor pilot during Comedy Death-Ray Radio, the first season lasted from January 4 to April 11, 2011.

Nerd Poker: Dungeons & Dragons with Brian Posehn and Friends

Comedian Brian Posehn hosted a weekly Dungeons & Dragons session, featuring stand-up comedians Blaine Capatch, Steve Agee, Dan Telfer, and actor Ken Daly. Guests (stand-in players) included Rick Remender and Dave Anthony. Original players who later moved on include Posehn's Deadpool co-writer Gerry Duggan, Sarah Guzzardo, and Scott "Mr. Sark" Robison. Nerd Poker has since left the network and become independent, with Guzzardo rejoining the regular cast.

Never Not Funny

A podcast featuring freeform conversations between Jimmy Pardo, Matt Belknap, and a guest. Never Not Funny joined Earwolf in January 2014.

Nocturnal Emotions

An interview podcast hosted by musician Har Mar Superstar.

Office Ladies

In Office Ladies, best friends and former cast members of The Office Jenna Fischer and Angela Kinsey review past episodes of the show, providing behind the scenes information and answering fan questions.

Off Book: The Improvised Musical

In Off Book, Jessica McKenna, Zach Reino, and a guest improvise an entire musical in each episode.

Pistol Shrimps Radio

A podcast where Matt Gourley and Mark McConville give an absurdist running commentary on games played by the Los Angeles–based women's basketball team the Pistol Shrimps.

Professor Blastoff

The Professor Blastoff podcast premiered in May 2011 and finished in July 2015 after 217 episodes. Hosted by Tig Notaro, Kyle Dunnigan, and David Huntsberger. Professor Blastoff focused on science, philosophy, and humanities. They have had guests such as Sarah Silverman, Amy Schumer, Bill Burr and many more comedians. Other guests include Molly Ringwald and Taylor Dayne. The evolution of Notaro's career is mapped over the 4 years of the podcast's airing, including her struggle with breast cancer.

Queery with Cameron Eposito

Standup comedian Cameron Esposito interviews LGBTQ+ celebrities, activists, and thinkers.

Question of the Day

A podcast where Stephen J. Dubner and James Altucher answer a question every Tuesday, Wednesday, and Thursday.

Rafflecast

A podcast hosted by Jon Daly where he does sketches and what he wants like making a song with Har Mar Superstar or calling Rob Huebel. Guests have included Honus Honus from Man Man, Brendon Small, Davin Wood of Heidecker And Wood, Doug Lussenhop, Adam Pally, Paul Scheer, Howard Kremer, Matt Besser, John Gemberling of Fat Guy Stuck in Internet, and Brian Huskey.

Raised By TV

In Raised By TV, Jon Gabrus and Lauren Lapkus discuss the television from their childhoods.

Reading Aloud

A reading podcast where Nate Corddry plays host to live renditions of interesting works of literature.

Ronna & Beverly

A podcast hosted by two characters — two Jewish women in their 50s. They often give unwanted advice to their guests.

The Room Where It's Happening

In The Room Where It's Happening, Travon Free and Mike Drucker bring on guests to discuss the musical Hamilton.

Seth Godin's Startup School

A business podcast hosted by author and marketing guru Seth Godin.

Shortwave

An interview podcast hosted by musician Grant-Lee Phillips.

Sklarbro Country

Sklarbro Country was the first show to be added to the Earwolf roster. It is hosted by Randy and Jason Sklar and is a sports-themed comedy program notably geared towards people that may not necessarily care about or follow sports. The brothers cover sports-related stories from around the world that normally would fall through the cracks of most sports news shows. In addition to The Sklars, voice actor Chris Cox often performs as various characters including Jerry Jones, Tiger Woods, Sam Elliott, and "Racist Vin Scully." Other characters are often played by Dan Van Kirk, James Adomian and Jason Nash. The show has featured a long list of famous guests, including Glenn Howerton and Kaitlin Olson from It's Always Sunny in Philadelphia, Jeffrey Ross, Patton Oswalt, and Jon Hamm, discussing specific sports stories or general themes of sports in the news. The title is a parody of Scarborough Country, a former opinion show on MSNBC hosted by former congressman Joe Scarborough.

The show ended when the Sklars migrated to Feral Audio in July 2017 and started Dumb People Town.

Spanish Aquí Presents

Spanish Aquí Presents is a comedy podcast hosted by Oscar Montoya, Raiza Licea, Tony Rodriguez, and Carlos Santos.

Spontaneanation

An improv podcast with host Paul F. Tompkins. Based upon an interview with a special guest, Tompkins and several "improvisational friends" (often co-stars from the Thrilling Adventure Hour or Superego podcasts, or co-stars from Tompkins' Seeso program Bajillion Dollar Propertie$) perform narrative improv set in a location provided by the guest.

The Three Questions with Andy Richter

An interview podcast where Andy Richter asks guests three questions: where they come from, where they are going, and what they have learned.

Threedom

Co-hosts Lauren Lapkus, Paul F. Tompkins, and Scott Aukerman spend quality time together and discuss their lives.

Topics

Topics is a satirical podcast hosted by Michael Ian Black and Michael Showalter. The two Michaels play fictionalized versions of themselves, having overly pretentious conversations about serious subjects, such as "Does God Exist?" and "Gender".

Totally Laime

Elizabeth Laime and "Psychic" Andy Rosen interview comedians every week. The first episode aired in February 2010, and the last premiered in January 2015. Features The Oprah Game and Laime or Totally Rapid-fire.

Urgent Care with Joel Kim Booster and Mitra Jouhari

Hosts Joel Kim Booster and Mitra Jouhari answer listener requests for relationship advice.

Voyage to the Stars

Voyage to the Stars is a comedic space exploration podcast featuring Felicia Day, Janet Varney, Steve Berg, and Colton Dunn.

Who Charted?

Who Charted? launched on December 7, 2010, focus on pop culture by analyzing various film box office and record charts. Each week Howard Kremer, with former co-host Kulap Vilaysack (2010–2018), host a guest from the comedy or music field to review the week's charts and discuss their feelings on them. Towards the end of the episode the guest will play one of a variety of games.

With Special Guest Lauren Lapkus

A podcast where every week a new person assumes hosting duties and the guest is Lauren Lapkus as an original character.

The Wolf Den

A business and media podcast hosted by Lex Friedman and Chris Bannon (previously Adam Sachs and Jeff Ullrich), focusing on the business of podcasting and digital media.

We Called Your Mom

Co-hosted by Beth Stelling and her mother Diane, We Called Your Mom features interviews with the mothers of popular artists and comedians.

WOMP It Up!

A "school project podcast" with Jessica St. Clair and Lennon Parham as their characters Marissa Wompler and Charlotte Listler.

Yo, Is This Racist?

A spin-off of the popular Tumblr blog of the same name, hosted by Andrew Ti, later joined by co-host Tawny Newsome. The show continued after leaving Earwold but was eventually ended in 2026, replaced by a Star Trek podcast entitled Starter Trek, also hosted by Ti and Newsome alongside producer and YouTuber Jessie Gender.
