= Nelufar Hedayat =

British-Afghan broadcast journalist and documentary presenter

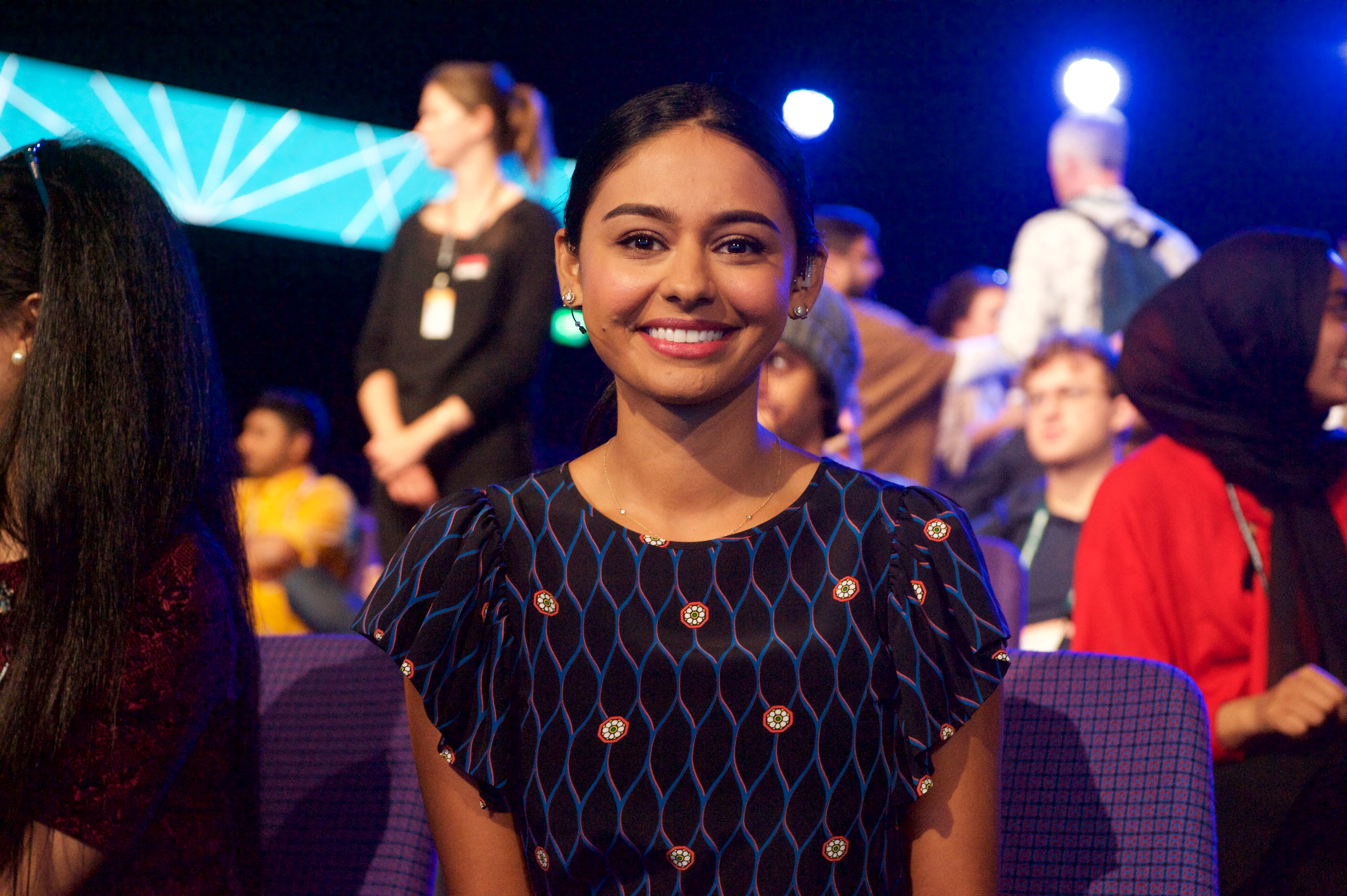
- Hedayat at Doha Debates
- Born: 1 January 1988 (age 38); Kabul, Republic of Afghanistan
- Other name: Nel
- Citizenship: United Kingdom; Afghanistan
- Education: University of Westminster
- Occupations: Journalist, correspondent, Presenter
- Years active: 2010–present

Nelufar Hedayat is a British-Afghan broadcast journalist, documentary presenter, and director. She has reported, produced, and presented international documentaries for the BBC, Channel 4, Fusion TV, Netflix, PBS, Scripps News, Rakuten TV, and National Geographic. Hedayat is known for fronting investigative and current affairs programmes including The Traffickers (2016), Food Exposed (2018), Generation C (2020–2025), and Plastic Time Bomb (2023), the latter of which won a National News & Documentary Emmy Award. Her work has covered global issues such as conflict, climate change, human rights, and cultural heritage, and has been recognised with awards including a Gracie Award and the British Asian Media Awards.

== Early life ==
Hedayat was born in Kabul, Afghanistan, and fled the country with her family during the civil war. They sought asylum in the United Kingdom when she was a child, settling in north London. She has spoken publicly about her experiences as a refugee and how they shaped her interest in journalism, and has said: "As a refugee I felt compelled to tell the stories that were surrounding me." Hedayat is of Kashmiri background.

== Career ==
Hedayat began her career with the BBC, presenting and reporting on current affairs documentaries for BBC Three, CBBC Newsround and Channel 4. Her early works include presenting Women, Weddings, War and Me (2010, directed by Ruhi Hamid), Music, Money & Hip Hop Honeys (2011) and Riots and Revolutions: My Arab Spring Journey (2012). She later reported on international documentaries such as The Children of Kabul: An Uncertain Future (2014), Vietnam's Dog Snatchers (2014) and Vaccination Wars (2015).

In 2016, she presented The Traffickers, an eight-part investigative series for Fusion TV, Netflix and Fremantle Media, which explored global smuggling networks and won Journalist of the Year and Best Investigation at the British Asian Media Awards. For her work on the series, she won the 2017 Reporter/Correspondent Gracie Award (presented by the Alliance for Women in Media), and was named Journalist of the Year at the Asian Media Awards.

She went on to host Food Exposed with Nelufar Hedayat (2018), an environmental and food documentary series, before presenting Flash Forward (Rakuten, 2021), a science and technology docuseries.

From 2020 to 2025, she executive produced and hosted Generation C: Rising Up in a Changed World, a four-part series examining the impact of the COVID-19 pandemic on young people.

Her subsequent work with Scripps International included producing and directing The God Thieves (2022), which investigated the illicit trade in cultural artifacts, and Plastic Time Bomb (2023), a science documentary that won the National News & Documentary Emmy Award for Outstanding Science, Technology or Environmental Coverage.

She also co-directed Culture’s Climate Crisis (2024), filmed across Tanzania and Alaska, and Museum on Fire (2025) for PBS and Scripps, which documented threats to UNESCO world heritage sites.

In 2025, she produced Binni's Blades, an observational documentary set in Birmingham, and began working as a Development Producer for Firecrest Films and Channel 4.

== Awards ==
- 2023 – News & Documentary Emmy Award: Plastic Time Bomb (Scripps News)
- 2016 – British Asian Media Awards: Journalist of the Year; Best Investigation (for The Traffickers)
- 2017 – Gracie Award, Reporter/Correspondent (Local or National TV)
- 2010 – Broadcast Digital Award: Women, Weddings, War and Me (BBC Three)

== Filmography ==
| Year | Title | Role | Broadcaster / Distributor |
|---|---|---|---|
| 2010 | Women, Weddings, War and Me | Presenter | BBC Three |
| 2011 | Music, Money & Hip Hop Honeys | Presenter | BBC Three |
| 2012 | Riots and Revolutions: My Arab Spring Journey | Presenter | BBC Three |
| 2013 | Shot for Going to School | Reporter | BBC Three |
| 2014 | The Children of Kabul: An Uncertain Future | Presenter | CBBC Newsround |
| 2014 | Vietnam's Dog Snatchers | Reporter | Channel 4 |
| 2015 | Vaccination Wars | Reporter | Channel 4 |
| 2016 | The Naked Truth: Standing Rock | Reporter | Fusion TV |
| 2016 | The Traffickers | Presenter | Fusion TV / Netflix / Fremantle |
| 2017 | The Naked Truth: Black Mama’s Matter/Death by Delivery | Presenter | Fusion TV |
| 2018 | Food Exposed with Nelufar Hedayat | Presenter & Co-producer | Fusion TV / Fremantle |
| 2018 | India’s Love Cheat Detectives | Reporter | Channel 4 |
| 2019 | The Story of God | Contributor | National Geographic / Netflix |
| 2020 | Criminal Planet: Toxic Mafia | Reporter | Viceland / Channel 4 |
| 2020–2025 | Generation C: Rising Up in a Changed World | Executive Producer & Presenter | SVT / Storyfire |
| 2021 | Flash Forward | Presenter | Rakuten TV |
| 2022 | The God Thieves | Producer & Co-director | Scripps / Newsy |
| 2023 | Plastic Time Bomb | Producer & Director | Scripps / Newsy |
| 2023 | Safety Versus Freedom in El Salvador | Correspondent | Scripps Longform |
| 2024 | Culture’s Climate Crisis | Producer & Co-director | Scripps International |
| 2025 | Pilgrimage (TV series) | Pilgrim | BBC |
| 2025 | Museum on Fire | Co-director & Correspondent | PBS / Scripps |
| 2025 | Binni’s Blades | Producer & Director | UK (independent/Scripps) |

=== Podcasts ===
| Year(s) | Title | Role | Platform |
|---|---|---|---|
| 2019–2021 | Course Correction | Host & Writer | Doha Debates |
