= Elizabeth Marquardt =

Elizabeth Marquardt is author of Between Two Worlds: The Inner Lives of Children of Divorce (Crown, 2005) which reports the first national study in the United States of grown children of divorce. In 2001, she co-authored (with Norval Glenn) a national study titled "Hooking Up, Hanging Out, and Hoping for Mr. Right: College Women on Dating and Mating Today." In 2010, she co-authored with Norval Glenn and Karen Clark the study "My Daddy's Name is Donor: A New Study of Young Adults Conceived Via Sperm Donation."

Marquardt appeared on news programs including NBC's Today, CNN, ABC, FOX, CBS, and PBS, BBC World News and national and local NPR stations. She published opinion pieces in the New York Times, Washington Post, Los Angeles Times, Slate, Huffington Post, and The Atlantic online. Her peer-reviewed single authored and co-authored chapters appeared in Social Science Research, John Marshall Law Review, and Sociology of Religion, and in volumes from New York University Press and Paradigm Press. She was a scholar at the Institute for American Values from 2000 to 2013. In spring 2013, she was a lecturer in American Studies at Lake Forest College.

Marquardt holds master's degrees in divinity and international relations from the University of Chicago and a B.A. in history with a minor in women's studies from Wake Forest University. She grew up in North Carolina.
