= Georgie Badiel =

Burkinabe model (born 1985)

- Born: February 7, 1985 (age 41); Burkina Faso
- Occupations: Model, activist
- Notable work: The Water Princess

Georgie Badiel Paulinha Borges (born February 7, 1985) is a Burkinabé model and activist. Badiel was Miss Burkina Faso in 2003 and Miss Africa 2004.

== Biography ==
Badiel was born on February 7, 1985 in Burkina Faso. She won the title of Miss Burkina Faso in 2003 and Miss Africa in 2004. She runs the Georgie Badiel Foundation, which is dedicated to increasing the available drinking water in her West African homeland. She co-wrote the children's picture book The Water Princess with Peter H. Reynolds and Susan Verde. The book was published by Penguin Random House in 2016.

== Personal life ==
Badiel lives in New York City.
