= Paloma Costa =

Brazilian climate activist

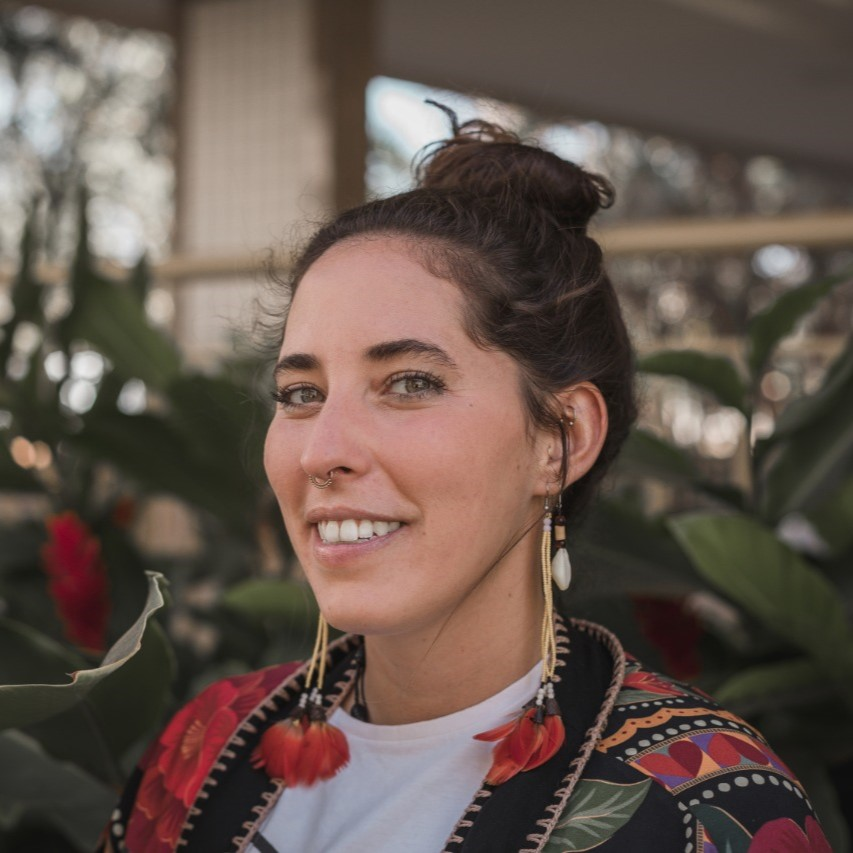

Paloma Costa Oliveira is a Brazilian law student, socioenvironmentalist, cycling activist, climate educator and youth mobiliser. She is one of the seven young climate leaders (aged 18–28) appointed by United Nations Secretary-General António Guterres to a Youth Advisory Group on global action to tackle the climate crisis and avert climate change.

== Activism ==
In 2019, alongside the activist Greta Thunberg, Paloma delivered a speech at the opening of the Climate Action Summit, in New York City. The speech drew criticism at her statement that 'We don't need prayers, we need action', which was understood by some as unreligious. 'My point', she clarified, 'was that it is worthless to keep posting #prayforamazonia on Twitter, while never ceasing to eat the meat that comes from deforestation'. Costa felt positive about the experience, but disappointed overall: 'There's just hardly any commitment...nothing really touched my heart.' She reported having spoken briefly with Angela Merkel and Michelle Bachelet, whilst no representatives from her own country's Bolsonaro administration would be willing to entertain her for a chat.

In an interview, Costa declares she would 'not for all the money in the world' work for a company that facilitates deforestation in the Amazon. Moreover, she decided to stop eating meat as soon as she learned about the relationship between the beef supply chain and deforestation. She also says she uses a bicycle for her daily commute whenever she can, as well as to go to parties sometimes.

Costa is a former exchange student to a Chilean university and has been an intern with Chile's Supreme Court. She is associated with Instituto Socioambiental (Socio-environmental Institute), youth-led organization Engajamundo, Ciclimáticos project, which she co-founded and #FreeTheFuture movement.
