= Women for Women International =

Nonprofit humanitarian organization

- Abbreviation: WfWI
- Formation: 1993; 33 years ago
- Founders: Zainab Salbi and Amjad Atallah
- Headquarters: Washington, D.C., U.S.
- International CEO: Thelma Ekiyor
- Award: Hilton Humanitarian Prize (2006)
- Website: womenforwomen.org

Women for Women International (WfWI) is a nonprofit humanitarian organization that provides practical and moral support to female survivors of war. WfWI helps such women rebuild their lives after war's devastation through a year-long tiered program that begins with direct financial aid and emotional counseling and includes life skills (e.g., literacy, numeracy) vocational training, rights awareness education, health education, and small business development.

== History ==
In 1993, Women for Women International was co-founded by husband and wife Amjad Atallah and Zainab Salbi; Salbi is an Iraqi American who is a survivor of the Iran–Iraq War.

They were motivated to act after learning of the plight of women in rape camps during the Yugoslav Wars and the slow response of the international community.

In its first year, Women for Women International worked with eight women, distributing about $9,000 in direct aid. As the organization gained experience, its staff came to understand that financial assistance alone was not a sufficient response for women who had lost everything. Women survivors of war, especially those left widowed, also needed to cultivate an understanding of their rights and potential as women, develop marketable skills, and find a way to generate stable income.

From 2012 to 2014, WfWI was led by Afshan Khan, a long-time former executive with UNICEF who became WfWI's first new CEO since founder Zainab Salbi stepped down to devote more time to her writing and lecturing. Laurie Adams served as CEO from 2016-2025. Current Global CEO, Thelma Ekiyor, began her tenure in October of 2025.

Headquartered in Washington, DC, WfWI also has executive/fundraising offices in London, UK and Hamburg, Germany and programmatic offices in eight conflict-affected countries: Bosnia and Herzegovina (1994); Democratic Republic of Congo (2004); Iraq (2003); Kosovo (1999); Nigeria (2000); Rwanda (1997); South Sudan (2006); and Palestine (2023); After 25 years serving in Afghanistan (2002), Women for Women International was forced to suspend operations.

As of 2025, the charity has helped roughly 616,184 marginalized women in countries affected by war.

In September 2006, Women for Women International was the first women's organization to receive the Hilton Humanitarian Prize, the world's largest humanitarian prize of $1.5 million. Amartya Sen, Nobel Laureate and Hilton Prize juror also commented on the selection saying women of war is a neglected issue and WfWI has identified the need and has gone on to protect millions of lives.

== Activities ==
Women for Women International connects donors with individual women in conflict zones in a sponsorship model called Stand With Her. The participants enroll in holistic program designed to help them gain the skills, confidence, psychological healing, and mutual support needed to rebuild their lives after war. After the program they become leaders in their communities.The program is paid for through a mix of individual "sister to sister" direct sponsorships and grants from governmental, multilateral, foundation, corporate, and individual donors.

Since 2016, WfWI has held an annual charity sale to raise money for women survivors of war. The 2017 sale raised over US$224,000.
