= List of The League episodes =

The League is an American comedy series created by Jeff Schaffer and Jackie Marcus Schaffer. It premiered on the FX Network on October 29, 2009 and concluded its first season of 6 episodes on December 10, 2009. A second season consisting of 13 episodes began airing on September 16, 2010 and concluded with a double-episode on December 9, 2010. The third season also of 13 episodes ran from October 6 to December 22, 2011 and the fourth season of 13 episodes ran from October 11 to December 20, 2012. On March 28, FX announced that the show would be renewed for a sixth season, along with its move to the new channel, FXX, starting with the fifth season. The series' 13 episode seventh and final season premiered September 9, 2015. The 84th and final episode of The League aired December 9, 2015.

== Series overview ==
Season	Episodes	Originally released		
Season	Episodes	First released	Last released	Network
1	6	October 29, 2009	December 10, 2009	FX
2	13	September 16, 2010	December 9, 2010	FX
3	13	October 6, 2011	December 22, 2011	FX
4	13	October 11, 2012	December 20, 2012	FX
5	13	September 4, 2013	November 20, 2013	FXX
6	13	September 3, 2014	November 19, 2014	FXX
7	13	September 9, 2015	December 9, 2015	FXX

== Episodes ==
=== Season 1 (2009) ===
No. overall	No. in season	Title	Directed by	Written by	Original release date	Production code	US viewers (millions)
1	1	"The Draft"	Jeff Schaffer	Jeff Schaffer & Jackie Marcus Schaffer	October 29, 2009	LE01001	0.994
A group of friends from Chicago begins their annual fantasy football league by preparing the league draft, but three-time defending champ Pete has a problem: his wife Meegan doesn't want him to play this season.
2	2	"The Bounce Test"	Jeff Schaffer	Jeff Schaffer & Jackie Marcus Schaffer	November 5, 2009	LE01002	1.41
Pete's split with Meegan intrudes on Ruxin's marriage, as Sofia is neglecting him sexually as she helps Meegan deal with the breakup. Meanwhile, Jenny reveals to Sofia the sexual secrets that ensure that Kevin will never leave her.
3	3	"Sunday at Ruxin's"	Jeff Schaffer	Jeff Schaffer & Jackie Marcus Schaffer	November 12, 2009	LE01003	1.03
Ruxin invites everyone over on Sunday to watch the games, see the baby, and have lunch. His guests get much more lunch than they expected when Ruxin and Sofia forbid the gang from watching football during their meal.
4	4	"Mr. McGibblets"	Jeff Schaffer	Jeff Schaffer & Jackie Marcus Schaffer & Craig DiGregorio	November 19, 2009	LE01004	0.859
The guys join Pete on what was supposed to be his 5th-anniversary spa trip. Meanwhile, Kevin gets Taco to dress up as Mr. McGibblets to scare his daughter Ellie away from her new toy, which she loves and he hates.
5	5	"The Usual Bet"	Jeff Schaffer	Jeff Schaffer & Jackie Marcus Schaffer	December 3, 2009	LE01005	1.05
Pete and Kevin get stuck at a terrible Christmas party instead of watching the playoffs; Ruxin and Taco go to Chinatown on a very special mission; Andre is secretly dating Shiva.
6	6	"The Shiva Bowl"	Jeff Schaffer	Jeff Schaffer & Jackie Marcus Schaffer	December 10, 2009	LE01006	1.20
On Shiva Bowl Sunday, the guys try to hide the Shiva Trophy from their former high-school classmate—the actual Shiva; Taco gets a "real-person job" at a Volkswagen dealership.

=== Season 2 (2010) ===
No. overall	No. in season	Title	Directed by	Written by	Original release date	Production code	US viewers (millions)
7	1	"Vegas Draft"	Jeff Schaffer	Jeff Schaffer & Jackie Marcus Schaffer	September 16, 2010	XLE02001	1.71
Andre plans an extravagant trip to Vegas, complete with Chad Ochocinco as MC, for the league's 2010 fantasy draft, but the group credits Pete to mess with Andre; when a spot on the league opens up during the trip, the gang must choose between Jenny and Ruxin's creepy brother-in-law Rafi.
8	2	"Bro-Lo El Cuñado"	Jeff Schaffer	Jeff Schaffer & Jackie Marcus Schaffer	September 23, 2010	XLE02002	1.05
The married men atone for Vegas with an adult weekend for Kevin and Jenny and "Terrific Lady Day" for Ruxin and Sofia; Rafi continues to plague the league with his abrasive personality and creepy mannerisms.
9	3	"The White Knuckler"	Jeff Schaffer	Jeff Schaffer & Jackie Marcus Schaffer	September 30, 2010	XLE02003	0.899
Andre brings in a new partner to expand his medical practice; Ruxin uses a sick child to meet Cleveland Browns WR Joshua Cribbs (who appears as himself); Pete deals with the complications of dating Kevin's ex-girlfriend (Lake Bell).
10	4	"The Kluneberg"	Jeff Schaffer	Jeff Schaffer & Jackie Marcus Schaffer	October 7, 2010	XLE02004	0.822
Jenny and the guys catch up with their old friend Russell (Rob Huebel); the guys all try to get Rafi out of the league by pretending that it's ending; Taco finds a toilet seat in a dumpster; and Andre buys an "interesting" expensive painting.
11	5	"The Marathon"	Jackie Marcus Schaffer	Craig DiGregorio	October 14, 2010	XLE02005	0.856
Pete keeps taunting Andre after he announces that he's running a marathon; Kevin and Jenny seek balance between their conflicting roles as spouses and league adversaries; Taco's new venture as a notary might help Ruxin when he offends a colleague.
12	6	"The Anniversary Party"	Jeff Schaffer	Nick Kroll & Paul Scheer	October 21, 2010	XLE02006	0.616
Ruxin throws Sofia an anniversary party—thanks to Taco, whom Ruxin believes did this to get inside his head—on the same day as Jenny's birthday. Meegan (Leslie Bibb) returns with a "plus one" (Jamey Sheridan).
13	7	"Ghost Monkey"	Jeff Schaffer	Jeff Schaffer & Jackie Marcus Schaffer	October 28, 2010	XLE02007	0.668
On Halloween, Kevin wants to intertwine child and adult Halloween themes into one big mash-up. Meanwhile, Pete has given Ruxin the privilege of selecting his opponent's team for their upcoming match; and Taco feels responsible for events relating to a petting-zoo monkey.
14	8	"The Tie"	Jackie Marcus Schaffer	Dan O'Keefe	November 4, 2010	XLE02008	1.01
Andre and Ruxin refuse to accept a tie, adding to Kevin's current frustrations as league commissioner; Pete has a connection for great Bears tickets, but the gang warns him about what he might need to provide in return; Taco discovers Western medicine.
15	9	"The Expert Witness"	Jeff Schaffer	Nick Kroll & Paul Scheer	November 11, 2010	XLE02009	1.00
Andre prepares for his turn as an expert witness in Ruxin's big case but thinks Pete is trying to steal his thunder. Meanwhile, the courtroom judge has a thing for Ruxin, who tries to ferret out collusion between Kevin and Jenny; and Taco needs a nude portrait to impress the courtroom artist (Alia Shawkat).
16	10	"High School Reunion"	Jeff Schaffer	Jeff Schaffer & Jackie Marcus Schaffer	November 18, 2010	XLE02010	1.04
At the guys' high school reunion, Andre is excited to show off his success and Ruxin is excited to show off his hot wife; Pete needs a name for the new last-place trophy; everyone learns the history of the Shiva blast; and Taco tries to capture a "Vinegar Stroke."
17	11	"Ramona Neopolitano"	Jeff Schaffer	Jeff Schaffer & Jackie Marcus Schaffer & Dan O'Keefe	December 2, 2010	XLE02011	0.982
During the last week before the playoffs, Andre's special diet makes him exceptionally emotional about his matchup; Kevin gets in a fight with fantasy-football gurus John Hansen and Adam Caplan; Ruxin begs the guys to cover for him when he lies to Sofia; and Pete might lose his job if he doesn't help his snooty boss get into the playoffs.
18	12	"Kegel the Elf"	Jeff Schaffer	Jeff Schaffer & Jackie Marcus Schaffer	December 9, 2010	XLE02012	1.05
It's Christmas—and, more importantly, it's the playoffs—so tension runs high. While Ruxin's revenge gift to Kevin goes terribly awry, Ellie suddenly acts up at school, causing Jenny to worry that all this attention to fantasy football is making her a bad mom. Meanwhile, Taco's eggs turn one year old; and Pete dates Ellie's teacher, with devastating results.
19	13	"The Sacko Bowl"	Jeff Schaffer	Jeff Schaffer & Jackie Marcus Schaffer	December 9, 2010	XLE020013	1.05
At season's end, Jenny and Ruxin vie for the Shiva while Andre and Taco duel to avoid the Sacko; Kevin learns to read lips by watching porn; and Pete buys a Crown Vic and is mistaken for a cop.

=== Season 3 (2011) ===
No. overall	No. in season	Title	Directed by	Written by	Original release date	Production code	US viewers (millions)
20	1	"The Lockout"	Jeff Schaffer	Jeff Schaffer & Jackie Marcus Schaffer	October 6, 2011	XLE03001	1.29
The dark reign of Ruxin as League Champion continues while the guys devise a grand plan with Rafi and Dirty Randy (Seth Rogen) for Andre's final Sacko punishment.
21	2	"The Sukkah"	Jeff Schaffer	Jeff Schaffer & Jackie Marcus Schaffer	October 13, 2011	XLE03002	0.947
Everyone is disappointed with their draft, but no one trusts anyone else enough to trade; Jenny returns to work as a realtor; Ruxin tries to get Baby Geoffrey into a Jewish preschool.
22	3	"The Au Pair"	Jeff Schaffer	Jeff Schaffer & Jackie Marcus Schaffer	October 20, 2011	XLE03003	1.05
Ruxin hires a hot au pair (Brie Larson) for Baby Geoffrey and is afraid Taco will sleep with her; Andre explores online dating; Kevin cheats on Jenny with ESPN fantasy-football analyst Matthew Berry.
23	4	"Ol' Smoke Crotch"	Jeff Schaffer	Jeff Schaffer & Jackie Marcus Schaffer	October 27, 2011	XLE03004	0.907
Ruxin tries to get rid of his useless au pair; Kevin worries over gray pubes.
24	5	"Bobbum Man"	Jeff Schaffer	Dan O'Keefe	November 3, 2011	XLE03005	1.17
Kevin is haunted by Pete's imaginary character, the "Bobbum Man," which takes on a life of its own through Taco's offline social network called "MyFace"; Ruxin gets Andre kicked out of yoga.
25	6	"Yobogoya!"	Jeff Schaffer	Jeff Schaffer & Jackie Marcus Schaffer	November 10, 2011	XLE03006	0.872
Jenny jeopardizes Ruxin's chance to work on a big case with his boss, Mr. Hudabega (Ray Liotta); Taco competes in a jingle contest for a fast-food restaurant; Pete has a grudge against a traffic cop.
26	7	"Carmenjello"	Jeff Schaffer	Justin Hurwitz	November 10, 2011	XLE03007	0.872
Kevin and Jenny search for the perfect paint color; Sofia accuses Ruxin of "breast favoritism"; Andre accidentally upsets a black janitor with a racist comment and donates money to the high school; Pete tries to defend his high-school pole-vaulting record.
27	8	"Thanksgiving"	Jeff Schaffer	Jeff Schaffer & Jackie Marcus Schaffer	November 17, 2011	XLE03008	0.857
Ruxin's father (Jeff Goldblum) shows up unexpectedly for Thanksgiving, during which Andre's sister (Sarah Silverman) is on the prowl; Taco makes an edible investment; Kevin and Jenny have a problem with Ellie's class pet.
28	9	"The Out of Towner"	Jeff Schaffer	Nick Kroll & Paul Scheer	December 1, 2011	XLE03009	1.01
The group's old buddy Chuck (Will Forte) returns as a sober man, but his sobriety is quickly put in jeopardy. Meanwhile, Taco goes on a diet and is in jeopardy of getting evicted by his landlord unless Ruxin has a great reason he should stay, but Ruxin is tripping on painkillers he stole from Andre after pulling his hamstring.
29	10	"The Light of Genesis"	Jackie Marcus Schaffer	Craig DiGregorio & David King	December 8, 2011	XLE03010	1.03
Kevin suspects that his Krav Maga teacher Kristen (Eliza Dushku) is hitting on him; Ruxin joins a cult to gain their Fantasy Football knowledge; Andre fails to keep a secret.
30	11	"The Guest Bong"	Jeff Schaffer	Jeff Schaffer & Jackie Marcus Schaffer & Dan O'Keefe	December 15, 2011	XLE03011	1.01
Pete's new girlfriend Danielle (Allison Williams) wants to help him with his lineup; Kevin's past at the DA's office has him running scared; Ruxin runs afoul of his company's email policies; and auto-correct gets everybody in trouble.
31	12	"St. Pete"	Jackie Marcus Schaffer	Jeff Schaffer & Jackie Marcus Schaffer	December 22, 2011	XLE03012	0.980
Kevin and Jenny make a bold bet on the play-offs; Taco enlists Ruxin to get more involved with Taco Corp; Pete has a devilish plan to send Ruxin to the Sacko.
32	13	"The Funeral"	Jeff Schaffer	Jeff Schaffer & Jackie Marcus Schaffer	December 22, 2011	XLE03013	0.889
In the season finale, the race is on for the Shiva and the Sacko. Taco teams up with Chicago Bears' Running Back Matt Forte, and Ruxin is unable to manage his own team for the big game, leaving the others to figure out who will run it for him.

=== Season 4 (2012) ===
No. overall	No. in season	Title	Directed by	Written by	Original release date	Production code	US viewers (millions)
33	1	"Training Camp"	Jeff Schaffer	Jeff Schaffer & Jackie Marcus Schaffer	October 11, 2012	XLE04001	0.907
The League awaits the draft--and the birth of Jenny and Kevin's son; Taco's latest business venture gets them invited to Dallas Cowboys training camp.
34	2	"The Hoodie"	Jeff Schaffer	Jeff Schaffer & Jackie Marcus Schaffer & Dave King	October 18, 2012	XLE04002	0.935
Kevin and Jenny bet on their son's circumcision; Pete and Taco compete over a newly-single woman; Ruxin expands his commissioner duties; everyone wants to know how and if Andre is circumcised.
35	3	"The Freeze Out"	Jeff Schaffer	Jeff Schaffer & Jackie Marcus Schaffer	October 25, 2012	XLE04003	0.759
Kevin and Jenny try to break her one-day sex record while attending kids' birthday parties; Pete gets frozen out while paintballing with Taco and Rafi; Ruxin is uneasy with a white sushi chef (Timothy Olyphant).
36	4	"The Breastalyzer"	Jeff Schaffer	Jeff Schaffer & Jackie Marcus Schaffer	November 1, 2012	XLE04004	0.860
Jenny deals with her annoying mother-in-law (Julia Duffy); Taco realizes he's in a relationship; Ruxin has Rafi pose as him during Baby Geoffrey's swimming lesson.
37	5	"Judge MacArthur"	Jeff Schaffer	Jeff Schaffer & Jackie Marcus Schaffer	November 8, 2012	XLE04005	0.831
Kevin meets Buffalo Bills quarterback Ryan Fitzpatrick at a charity event; the guys try to find out who is the smartest of the group.
38	6	"The Tailgate"	Jeff Schaffer	Nick Kroll & Paul Scheer	November 15, 2012	XLE04006	0.773
A trip to a Bears game goes from bad to worse when Andre messes up the tailgate and the guys face off with their high-school rivals.
39	7	"The Vapora Sport"	Jeff Schaffer	Justin Hurwitz	November 29, 2012	XLE04007	0.870
Pete fights with a guy in a wheelchair (JB Smoove) over a pair of running shoes; Kevin regrets buying Ellie a piano; Taco accidentally conditions a dog to bark at the scent of sex.
40	8	"The Anchor Baby"	Jackie Marcus Schaffer	Dan O'Keefe	December 6, 2012	XLE04008	0.726
Ruxin fears that Sofia plans to leave him; Peter tries to avoid a "douchey" acquaintance; Jenny backstabs Kevin on a trade with Ruxin; Taco moves into a dead psychologist's apartment and takes over his practice; the gang learns Andre's innermost secrets.
41	9	"Bro-Lo El Cordero"	Jeff Schaffer	Jeff Schaffer & Jackie Marcus Schaffer	December 6, 2012	XLE04009	0.726
Andre and Kevin disagree over the legitimacy of a trade made right after Kevin's colonoscopy; Pete's grandfather moves into a retirement home and uses the freedom to attempt adultery.
42	10	"Our Dinner With Andre"	Jeff Schaffer	Jeff Schaffer & Jackie Marcus Schaffer	December 13, 2012	XLE04010	0.722
Pete runs into his old high-school crush (Brooklyn Decker) who humiliated him, and Andre helps him woo her; Ellie's boyfriend blackmails Kevin; Taco offers Ruxin a meal to help his low sperm count.
43	11	"12.12.12"	Jeff Schaffer	Jeff Schaffer & Jackie Marcus Schaffer	December 13, 2012	XLE04011	0.722
Andre dates his interior decorator (Jayma Mays), and Deion Sanders thinks about buying Andre's house; Kevin gets a concussion trying to claim Michael Bush off waivers; Andre takes the guys out fashion-shopping; Pete continues to date his high-school crush.
44	12	"A Krampus Carol"	Jeff Schaffer	Jeff Schaffer & Jackie Marcus Schaffer	December 20, 2012	XLE04012	0.816
Rupert Ruxin (Jeff Goldblum) has an offer for his son; Taco tries to convince the mall manager (Bob Odenkirk) that the mall should have the frightful German Santa-counterpart Krampus in addition to a Santa; Kevin and Jenny try to appease Shiva.
45	13	"The Curse of Shiva"	Jeff Schaffer	Jeff Schaffer & Jackie Marcus Schaffer	December 20, 2012	XLE04013	0.816
Ruxin tries to survive Scrote Season; Pete crosses paths with Adrian Peterson; Taco throws a New Year's party to unveil a new invention.

=== Season 5 (2013) ===
No. overall	No. in season	Title	Directed by	Written by	Original release date	Production code	US viewers (millions)
46	1	"The Bachelor Draft"	Jeff Schaffer	Jeff Schaffer & Jackie Marcus Schaffer	September 4, 2013	XLE05001	0.786
The League visits Los Angeles for Andre and Trixie's wedding; Ruxin quits to avoid his Sacko punishments, while the rest of the League--including out-of-towner Ted (Adam Brody)--secretly drafts during the bachelor party.
47	2	"The Von Nowzick Wedding"	Jeff Schaffer	Jeff Schaffer & Jackie Marcus Schaffer	September 11, 2013	XLE05002	0.595
Andre's wedding is put in jeopardy when the bride discovers that the League used the weekend as an opportunity to draft.
48	3	"Chalupa vs. The Cutlet"	Jeff Schaffer	Jeff Schaffer & Jackie Marcus Schaffer	September 18, 2013	XLE05003	0.502
Kevin and Jenny try to befriend Jay and Kristin Cutler when they realize their kids go to the same preschool; Pete tries to cheer up Andre with a visit from Taco's Eskimo brother.
49	4	"Rafi and Dirty Randy"	Jeff Schaffer	Jason Mantzoukas & Seth Rogen	September 25, 2013	XLE05004	0.445
Rafi steals Kevin's car to head to Los Angeles with Dirty Randy to avenge their friend's murder.
50	5	"The Bye Week"	Jeff Schaffer	Jeff Schaffer & Jackie Marcus Schaffer	October 2, 2013	XLE05005	0.424
Ruxin misses his business trip and decides to hide out in Chicago; Taco turns Uncle Frank's handicap van into a food truck; Kevin and Jenny's sexiversary ends badly for Jenny.
51	6	"Heavy Petting"	Jeff Schaffer	Jeff Schaffer & Jackie Marcus Schaffer & Justin Hurwitz	October 9, 2013	XLE05006	0.415
Taco turns his van into a puppy-petting zoo; Kevin rebels against Jenny's mandate to eat healthier; Pete turns Andre into a "trade maid"; Ruxin fights with a neighbor over pee spots in her lawn.
52	7	"The Bringer Show"	Jeff Schaffer	Stephen Rannazzisi & Paul Scheer	October 16, 2013	XLE05007	0.523
Andre tries stand-up comedy; Jenny joins the Lucrative Ladies Club and Taco crashes a meeting; Kevin pours his feelings into his workout diary; Ruxin starts his team two players short against Pete.
53	8	"Flowers for Taco"	Jeff Schaffer	Dan O'Keefe	October 23, 2013	XLE05008	0.420
Taco gets not-high and becomes sharp for the first time in years; Jenny finds that she no longer arouses Ruxin's dog; Kevin accidentally teaches Chalupa Batman his first word; Andre has never been pooped on by a bird.
54	9	"The Automatic Faucet"	Jeff Schaffer	Jeff Schaffer & Jackie Marcus Schaffer	October 30, 2013	XLE05009	0.363
Kevin has trouble washing his hands; Andre is sued for medical malpractice; Pete applies his fantasy-football skills to the workplace; Rafi plots Kevin's death to get an early inheritance.
55	10	"The Near Death Flex-perience"	Jackie Marcus Schaffer	Justin Hurwitz	November 6, 2013	XLE05010	0.477
Taco opens Pubercuts, a groin salon; Kevin gets in trouble with Jenny when he sees a vision of Greg Jennings during a near-death experience; Andre works with an ALS patient whose speech computer sounds exactly like Ruxin.
56	11	"The Credit Card Alert"	Jeff Schaffer	Jeff Schaffer & Jackie Marcus Schaffer & Dan O'Keefe	November 13, 2013	XLE05011	0.509
Pete makes a new friend (Ali Larter) in a fine-clothing store, but she's got baggage; Taco becomes a fan of security; Jenny sends Kevin to talk to their daughter's basketball coach (Erin Heatherton).
57	12	"Baby Geoffrey Jesus"	Jeff Schaffer	Jeff Schaffer & Jackie Marcus Schaffer	November 20, 2013	XLE05012	0.411
Andre plays a long-con on Pete using a fake Vernon Davis Twitter account; Ruxin and Sofia debate over which religion Geoffrey should follow; Jenny and Kevin fight about her "lineup cheating" fiasco.
58	13	"The 8 Defensive Points of Hanukkah"	Jeff Schaffer	Jeff Schaffer & Jackie Marcus Schaffer	November 20, 2013	XLE05013	0.368
Jenny plays Andre for the Shiva; Dr. Hector Rocha (Aziz Ansari) cons Andre into going to El Salvador; Rafi tries to sleep with Ruxin's sister (Lizzy Caplan); Taco starts the Eskimo Brothers Database.

=== Season 6 (2014) ===
No. overall	No. in season	Title	Directed by	Written by	Original release date	Production code	US viewers (millions)
59	1	"Sitting Shiva"	Jeff Schaffer	Jeff Schaffer & Jackie Marcus Schaffer	September 3, 2014	XLE06001	0.604
After Ted's untimely death, the League drafts at his funeral; Jenny delights in Kevin's Sacko punishment; no insult will stick to Andre; Taco takes up golf.
60	2	"Tefl-Andre"	Jeff Schaffer	Jeff Schaffer & Jackie Marcus Schaffer & David Parker	September 10, 2014	XLE06002	0.491
Russell joins the League; Andre gets help from Jay Glazer; Ruxin gives Geoffrey an unfair advantage in Little League.
61	3	"The Height Supremacist"	Jeff Schaffer	Jeff Schaffer & Jackie Marcus Schaffer	September 17, 2014	XLE06003	0.572
Banished to South Korea, Ruxin remains in touch with the League; Pete enlists Taco Corp in helping get a raise at work; Andre anticipates a punishment that does not exist; Ellie takes Darren Sproles to her Sadie Hawkins dance.
62	4	"When Rafi Met Randy"	Jeff Schaffer	Jason Mantzoukas & Seth Rogen	September 24, 2014	XLE06004	0.539
Rafi and Randy's tragic origins are revealed, including their stint at--and escape from--a mental hospital. Back in the present day, Rafi's post-gunshot fate is revealed.
63	5	"The Hot Tub"	Jeff Schaffer	Jeff Schaffer & Jackie Marcus Schaffer & Markham O'Keefe	October 1, 2014	XLE06005	0.485
Kevin and Jenny buy a hot tub; Pete's new girlfriend (Brenda Song) causes a hand-holding epidemic; Jenny shows houses to Taco; Andre takes advice from too many people; Kevin tries new pants.
64	6	"Breast Awareness Month"	Jackie Marcus Schaffer	Justin Hurwitz	October 8, 2014	XLE06006	0.399
Kevin learns that his urologist is gay; Jenny uses a bandana to her advantage; Taco starts a charity; Pete tries to stop people from thinking he has "an Asian thing."
65	7	"The Heavenly Fouler"	Jeff Schaffer	Dan O'Keefe	October 15, 2014	XLE06007	0.461
Ellie fears for her parents' souls; Pete must choose between a legendary prank on Andre and a spectacular girlfriend (Anna Camp); Taco's EBDB is compromised.
66	8	"Man Land"	Jeff Schaffer	Jeff Schaffer & Jackie Marcus Schaffer	October 22, 2014	XLE06008	0.331
The gang spends the night in the forest and Kevin proves to his father-in-law Bruce that he is, in fact, a man; Andre and Russell decide to open their own wine bar, and not on the greatest of terms.
67	9	"Taco Standard Time"	Jeff Schaffer	Jeff Schaffer & Jackie Marcus Schaffer & Justin Hurwitz	October 29, 2014	XLE06009	0.401
The group's acquaintance Lane (Zach Woods) becomes suicidal; Andre finds himself in an abusive relationship with his cat; Taco proposes an alternative to Daylight Saving Time.
68	10	"Epi Sexy"	Jeff Schaffer	Jeff Schaffer & Jackie Marcus Schaffer & Nathaniel Stein	November 5, 2014	XLE06010	0.366
Pete's girlfriend has epileptic seizures during sex; Andre claims he needs glasses; Jenny must cook chow mein for Ellie's class.
69	11	"EBDBBnB"	Jeff Schaffer	Jeff Schaffer & Jackie Marcus Schaffer	November 12, 2014	XLE06011	0.648
Ruxin tries to solve the mystery of a toothbrush in the bathroom; Pete develops a gluten allergy; Andre invites everybody to watch the games at his wine bar while Taco invites everybody to his new bed-and-breakfast.
70	12	"Menage a Cinq"	Jeff Schaffer	Jeff Schaffer & Jackie Marcus Schaffer	November 19, 2014	XLE06012	0.323
Andre and Russell (Rob Huebel) open their wine bar; Pete dates one of Andre's plastic-surgery patients; Taco gets addicted to a new kind of herb.
71	13	"The Beach House"	Jeff Schaffer	Jeff Schaffer & Jackie Marcus Schaffer	November 19, 2014	XLE06013	0.276
Everybody travels to Laguna Beach to settle the season and determine the winner of Ted's beach house; Ruxin befriends NFL superagent Tom Condon; Jenny can't part with the Shiva.

=== Season 7 (2015) ===
One month after the conclusion of the 6th season, FXX announced that they had renewed The League for a seventh and final season. It premiered on September 9, 2015.

No. overall	No. in season	Title	Directed by	Written by	Original release date	Production code	US viewers (millions)
72	1	"That Other Draft"	Jeff Schaffer	Jeff Schaffer & Jackie Marcus Schaffer	September 9, 2015	XLE07001	0.720
Pete bumps into his ex-wife; Jenny is a VIP during the draft in Chicago, while Kevin runs into the Seahawks' general manager; Marshawn Lynch attends Taco Corp's annual board meeting.
73	2	"The Draft of Innocence"	Jeff Schaffer	Jeff Schaffer & Jackie Marcus Schaffer	September 16, 2015	XLE07002	0.382
Nobody likes Andre's idea of a themed draft; Pete isn't speaking to Andre; the League agrees to an auction draft and meets huge problems.
74	3	"The Blind Spot"	Jeff Schaffer	Jeff Schaffer & Jackie Marcus Schaffer	September 23, 2015	XLE07003	0.547
Taco launches EBDBPrime; Ruxin thinks he has the house to himself; everybody argues over where to watch games.
75	4	"Deflategate"	Jeff Schaffer	Justin Hurwitz	September 30, 2015	XLE07004	0.634
Jenny turns to Green Bay wide receiver Randall Cobb for relationship advice; Frank The Body Gibbiati sues Andre.
76	5	"The Bully"	Jeff Schaffer	Nathaniel Stein	October 7, 2015	XLE07005	0.368
Ellie's new sex-education class makes Kevin uncomfortable; Taco starts a program at EBDBBnB called Little Eskimo Brothers.
77	6	"The Beer Mile"	Jeff Schaffer	Jeff Schaffer & Jackie Marcus Schaffer	October 14, 2015	XLE07006	0.440
Taco coaches Pete to run the Beer Mile; Jenny plays Andre and Meegan to secure victory in her match-up against Andre; Kevin obsesses over where the gardener relieves himself.
78	7	"Trophy Kevin"	Jeff Schaffer	Jeff Schaffer & Jackie Marcus Schaffer & David Parker	October 21, 2015	XLE07007	0.329
Andre uses the EBDBBnB for farming; Taco acquires a drone; Pete's new referee friend unsettles Kevin.
79	8	"The Last Temptation of Andre"	Jeff Schaffer	Dan O'Keefe	October 28, 2015	XLE07008	0.405
Andre joins a Korean church for the parking; Detroit Wide Receiver Golden Tate flips the script when he and Taco create a fantasy workplace league and draft the others.
80	9	"The Yank Banker"	Jeff Schaffer	Jeff Schaffer & Jackie Marcus Schaffer & Markham O'Keefe	November 4, 2015	XLE07009	0.452
Pete is unsure he wants to commit to Libby; Taco embraces his dayjob in the banking world; Andre's patient is a college crush.
81	10	"The Block"	Jeff Schaffer	Paul Scheer	November 11, 2015	XLE070010	0.337
Concussions make Taco retire from sex; Andre's one-night stand with an Uber driver backfires; Pete binge-watches 7 seasons of "The Block"; Ruxin and Sofia use the Internet to keep their sex life going while she's in Puerto Rico.
82	11	"Adios y Bienvenidos"	Jeff Schaffer	Jeff Schaffer & Jackie Marcus Schaffer	November 18, 2015	XLE07011	0.373
Sofia dies in surgery. Rafi and Dirty Randy journey to Puerto Rico to bring her body back to Chicago so Ruxin can say goodbye.
83	12	"The 13 Stages of Grief"	Jeff Schaffer	Jeff Schaffer & Jackie Marcus Schaffer	December 2, 2015	XLE07012	0.406
Kevin must run the League old-school when they're kicked off their fantasy-football Website; Jenny deals with loss; Rafi counsels Ruxin; Andre tries to co-opt Ruxin's dinner reservation.
84	13	"The Great Night of Shiva"	Jeff Schaffer	Jeff Schaffer & Jackie Marcus Schaffer	December 9, 2015	XLE07013	0.456
Andre throws a baby shower; Ruxin discovers a dirty secret and contemplates whether to reveal it while the League members battle for the Shiva in a highest-score-wins format; Jenny and Kevin make a side bet with a new trophy; Taco struggles with the possibility that he's in legal trouble; Andre elopes.
