= Scotty Doesn't Know =

2004 song performed by Lustra

Single by Lustra

from the album Eurotrip and Left for Dead
- Released: February 24, 2004
- Recorded: 2003
- Genre: Pop-punk
- Length: 2:55
- Label: XOFF
- Songwriters: Jason Adams; Christopher Graham Baird; Nicholas Cloutman; Bruce Fulford
- Producer: Scott Riebling

Lustra singles chronology
"Porno Getaway" (2000)	"Scotty Doesn't Know" (2004)	"I'm Having Santa for Christmas" (2007)

"Scotty Doesn't Know" is a song written and performed by the American rock band Lustra. Originally written for the 2004 film EuroTrip, the song contains numerous mocking sexual references to how Scotty's girlfriend, Fiona, has been cheating on him for an extended period of time, although Scotty remains oblivious. Lyrically, the song is inspired by the real-life story of the band's high school friend Sheridon, whose middle name was Scotty, and is written from the perspective of the person with whom she is having the affair. The song was eventually released on Lustra's 2006 album Left for Dead. The song peaked at #53 on the U.S. Billboard Pop chart, #39 on the Digital Songs chart and at #75 on the Hot 100, mainly due to the high number of digital downloads.

== EuroTrip ==
In the film EuroTrip, Scotty (Scott Mechlowicz) is dumped by his girlfriend Fiona (Kristin Kreuk) for a band's lead singer (Matt Damon). The band performs the song at a party Scotty is attending and the song is praised by many characters in the film (including Scotty's parents and eventually Scotty himself) as being "catchy". The song becomes something of a popular phenomenon, appearing on the radio and across the world; in Bratislava, the song has been remixed and is playing in a popular nightclub. By the end of the film, it has become so widespread and popular that Scotty's best friend Cooper is able to use it as his cell phone ring tone.

== Writing ==
EuroTrip film director Jeff Schaffer described "Scotty Doesn't Know" as "what's the most embarrassing thing you could do that could happen to you after graduation?" Film writer David Mandel, members of Lustra, and Damon attended Harvard College together. The producers chose Lustra's version over another song written by Matt Mahaffey of Self, in which "Scotty Doesn't Know" also repeats in the chorus.

== Legacy ==
While EuroTrip was not successful in theaters, "Scotty Doesn't Know" helped the film to become popular on home video as a cult classic. In 2006 "Scotty Doesn't Know" hit the Billboard Hot 100, making Lustra among the first unsigned bands, other than Lisa Loeb, to appear on a record chart. Matt Damon stated that fans would often come up to him and say "Scotty Doesn't Know".

On October 18, 2018, the Prime Minister of Australia, Scott Morrison, had his personal website taken over as a prank after his ownership of it was apparently allowed to lapse. Instead of displaying information about the Prime Minister and his policies, the page displayed an image of Morrison with the song "Scotty Doesn't Know" playing on repeat. The man behind the website claimed to have paid A$50 for the domain name.

== Chart positions ==
Chart (2006)	Peak position
U.S. Billboard Hot 100	75
U.S. Billboard Pop 100	59
U.S. Digital Songs	39

== Certifications ==
Region	Certification	Certified units/sales
United Kingdom (BPI)	Gold	400,000^{‡}
United States (RIAA)	Platinum	1,000,000^{‡}
^{‡} Sales+streaming figures based on certification alone.
