= Left for Dead (Lustra album) =

Studio album by Lustra
- Released: February 28, 2006
- Genre: Pop-punk
- Length: 38:32
- Label: XOFF
- Producer: Scott Riebling; John Paterno; Sylvia Massy Shivy

Lustra chronology
| Lustra (2003) | Left for Dead (2006) | What You Need & What You Get (2008) |

Singles from Left for Dead
- 1. "Scotty Doesn't Know" Released: 2004

Left for Dead is the second studio album by American pop-punk band, Lustra. The album was released on February 28, 2006, through XOFF Records. Including the band's history as "Seventeen", this is the fourth studio album by the band.

The album contains their single "Scotty Doesn't Know", which was the first single to chart, reaching number 53 on the Billboard Pop 100 and 78 on the Billboard Hot 100. The song was featured in the 2004 film, Eurotrip.

== Tracks ==
| No. | Title | Length |
|---|---|---|
| 1. | "Porno Getaway" | 2:05 |
| 2. | "Scotty Doesn't Know" | 2:56 |
| 3. | "Standing At Your Grave" | 4:32 |
| 4. | "Stay Awake" | 2:50 |
| 5. | "Sometimes" | 4:01 |
| 6. | "Sniffing Cigarettes" | 3:02 |
| 7. | "Scrambled" | 5:57 |
| 8. | "Coming In Stereo" | 3:17 |
| 9. | "Mark Foo" | 3:08 |
| 10. | "Roll" | 3:05 |
| 11. | "Papillion" | 3:43 |
| Total length: | | 38:32 |

== Personnel ==
Lustra

- Chris Baird - bass guitar, vocals
- Nicholas James More Cloutman - guitar, vocals
- Chris Cunningham - drums
- Travis A. Lee - guitar

Additional musicians

- Jason Adams - guitar
- John Baird - guitar, vocals
- Bruce Fulford - drums
- John Paterno - piano
- Jason Sutter - drums

Production

- Scott Riebling - producer (1, 2, 5, 9, 10)
- John Paterno - producer (3, 4, 6, 8), mixing (3, 4, 6, 8)
- Sylvia Massy Shivy - producer (7, 11)
- Joe Barresi - mixing (5, 7, 10, 11)
- Chris Lord-Alge - mixing (2)
- Ron St. Germain - mixing (1, 9)
- Howie Weinberg & Roger Lian - mastering at Masterdisk
