= Daddy Knows Best =

American comedy web series

- Genre: Comedy
- Created by: Jeff Danis; Ryan O'Neill; Steve Rannazzisi
- Starring: Stephen Rannazzisi
- Country of origin: United States
- No. of seasons: 2
- No. of episodes: 17

Production
- Producer: Jeff Sharpe
- Production location: New York City
- Running time: 1-8 minutes

Original release
- Network: YouTube; Blip
- Release: March 27, 2012

Daddy Knows Best is an American comedy web series created, written and produced by Jeff Danis, Ryan O'Neill and starring Stephen Rannazzisi from The League, an American sitcom about a fantasy football league. The series is broadcast on the internet and premiered in 2012, distributed across the web including on My Damn Channel and Blip. Daddy Knows best is a comedy web series about a Dad who gets himself into terrible situation and is really bad at being a father. Daddy Knows Best has received over 72,528,411 views combined since April 2012.

A second season was announced in 2013.

== Season 1 ==
Episode 1: The Babysitter - Steve has a traumatizing experience with a babysitter
Episode 2: Special Brownies - Steve bakes some pot brownies that fall into the wrong hands.
Episode 3: Taser - Steve forgets his child and gets into a fight.
Episode 4: A Trip To Swim - Steve takes his kid to a strip club. His wife is not happy
Episode 5: Sh** - Steve has an accident which involves excrement.
Episode 6: A YouTube Sensation - Steve exploits his kid for internet fame.
Episode 7: Game Night - Steve gets too sexual at porno pictionary game night.
