= Chapeaumelon =

Canadian band

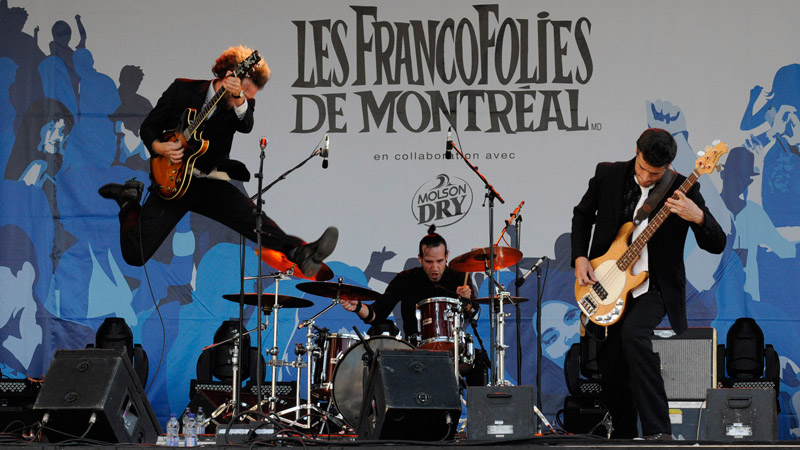

Background information
- Origin: Canada, Montreal
- Genres: Rock, pop rock
- Years active: 2001–2012
- Members: Charles Boyer; Tarik Akbik; Fredéric Tessier
- Past members: François Thériault; Jean-Pierre Décarie; Sylvain Larose; Francis Lareau

Chapeaumelon is a French-Canadian band most notable for a cover of The Who's "My Generation" and their song "Nonchalant (Sofa)" used in the 2004 film Eurotrip and its soundtrack.

== History ==
A few months after the band's genesis, Chapeaumelon won the Coup de Cœur prize at the Festival International de la chanson de Granby, Quebec. The following summer, the band held their second performance at the Les FrancoFolies de Montréal and earned the Coup de Cœur de l'Année.

The band was quickly taken under the wings of Jacques Dion and Michel Trudel's, who helped them to produce their first record at the prestigious Studios Piccolo (Daniel Bélanger, Céline Dion, Diane Dufresne, Jean-Pierre Ferland, Simple Plan, The Smashing Pumpkins,...) by the end of October 2002. Celine Dion's drummer Dominique Messier produced a few songs as well. Backed by the Gillett entertainment company, they toured Ontario and Quebec.

Their songs climbed the charts quickly in both provinces but also in New Brunswick. The hit "L'Acheteur" became their first video which won the 2002 prize for best French video on "French Kiss", the Much Music television program. David Lahaye directed both this and the following video, "Sofa" or "Nonchalant". This record was extraordinarily well received and was filed under Le Devoir's 2003 top 10 best records.

Chapeaumelon was then honored to be dubbed one of Quebec's 10 people of the year by Les Incontournables TV show. They had the opportunity to open for well known acts such as Marc Déry, Sylvain Cossette, Blue Rodeo, The Tea Party (...) as well as being heard in popular series such as Las Vegas, Scooby-Doo and Ghost Whisperer.

Chapeaumelon wsd also invited to sing their hit "Victoire" at Celine Dion's 2003 record launch in Las Vegas.

In 2004, two of their songs are included in the American movie Eurotrip. "My Generation", the classic The Who's cover, being chosen as the opening credits theme.

After three years out of the spotlight, Chapeaumelon returned with a new rhythm section : Tarik Akbik on bass and Fredéric Tessier on drums, winning Richmond's Festirock contest in March 2008. They then opened for Jonas at Sherbrooke's Canada day celebrations. Their latest release "Bonjour Bonsoir" was launched at last year's Francofolies, opening for Les BB and after winning yet another music contest at the Beloeil festival, the band opened for Marie-Chantal Toupin and Offenbach in August.

Also, their new song "Mademoiselle Éphémère" was on MTV's The Hills (Season 3-Episode 19) who incidentally broke audience records of 4.7 million viewers in the US alone.
