= Lustra (band) =

American rock band

- Origin: Boston, Massachusetts, U.S.
- Genres: Indie rock, alternative rock, pop punk
- Years active: 1996–2016
- Label: XOFF
- Past members: Chris Baird; Nick Cloutman; Jason Adams; Gant Frink; Jon Baird; Bruce Fulford; Travis Lee; Phil Matthews; Chris Cunningham

Lustra was an American rock band originally from Boston and later based in Los Angeles. The band started as Seventeen in 1996 before changing their name to Lustra in 2001 in response to a proposed lawsuit by a publication sharing the band's original name.

The band is known for their 2004 song "Scotty Doesn't Know", which was featured in the 2004 teen sex comedy film EuroTrip. The song eventually became a sleeper hit after being included on their 2006 studio album Left for Dead, which helped the track chart on the Billboard Hot 100 at 75, their only entry on the chart. The band split up in 2016.

== History ==
=== Seventeen (1996–2001) ===
Band members Chris Baird, Nick Cloutman, Jon Baird, and Jason Adams first played together in 1996 under the name Seventeen, releasing two full-length albums and an EP under this name. Bruce Fulford joined the group shortly before the release of their 1999 EP. Legal challenges from Seventeen magazine eventually led the band to change names in 2001; Jon Baird also left the group that same year.

=== Lustra (2001–2016) ===
Their first full-length album as Lustra was issued in 2003, and soon after the group performed the song "Scotty Doesn't Know" on the soundtrack to the 2004 film EuroTrip. The band also appears briefly in the film, with Matt Damon acting (and lip-synching) as their lead vocalist. The film was not a box office success but sold well on DVD, raising the band's profile long after its theatrical run. "Scotty Doesn't Know" was included on Lustra's 2006 album, Left for Dead, and became a hit single that year almost entirely as a result of download sales, eventually peaking at No. 75 on the Billboard Hot 100, No. 39 on the Digital Songs chart, and No. 53 on the Pop 100 in the United States. What You Need & What You Get was released in September 2008.

In an interview with The Witzard in 2023, Adams confirmed that the last time the band had recorded new material was 2016, with new drummer Gant Frink present. Adams also stated that the band had effectively split after Baird had moved back to the East Coast.

== Band members ==
=== Final line-up ===
- Chris Baird – lead vocals, bass (1996–2016) drums (2006–2011)
- Nick Cloutman – guitar, bass, vocals (1996–2016)
- Gant Frink – drums (2011–2016)

=== Previous members ===
- Jon Baird – guitar (1996–2001)
- Jason Adams – guitar (1996–2004)
- Bruce Fulford – drums (2002–2004)
- Travis Lee – guitar (2004–2005)
- Phil Matthews – drums (2004–2006)
- Chris Cunningham – drums (2006)

== Discography ==
=== Studio albums ===
Title	Details
Breakfast at Tammy's (as Seventeen)	Released: December 31, 1998; Label: Risky, XOFF; Format: LP, CD
Bikini Pie Fight (as Seventeen)	Released: 2000 (re-released February 12, 2003); Label: XOFF; Format: LP, CD, streaming
Lustra	Released: February 12, 2003; Label: XOFF; Format: LP, CD, streaming
Left for Dead	Released: February 22, 2006; Label: XOFF; Format: LP, CD, streaming
What You Need & What You Get	Released: September 24, 2008; Label: Self-released; Format: LP, CD, streaming

=== Extended plays ===
Title	Details
Ransom Your Handsome (as Seventeen)	Released: 1999; Label: Risky; Format: LP, CD
...Comes in Three's	Released: December 1, 2009; Label: Self-released; Format: Digital download, streaming

=== Singles ===
Title	Year	Peak chart positions		Certifications	Album
Title	Year	US	US Dig.	Certifications	Album
"Porno Getaway" (as Seventeen)	2000	—	—		Bikini Pie Fight
"Scotty Doesn't Know"	2004	75	39	RIAA: Platinum; BPI: Gold	Eurotrip and Left for Dead
"I'm Having Santa for Christmas"	2007	—	—		Non-album single
