= Jackie Schaffer =

American screenwriter

Jackie Schaffer (née Marcus) is an American screenwriter.

== Filmography ==
- EuroTrip (2004) (producer)
- Trailer Park Boys: The Movie (executive producer 2006)
- Disturbia (2007) (producer)
- Worst Enemy (2010) (executive producer)
- The League (45 episodes as executive producer and writer 2009-2012, 5 as director 2010-2012)

== Personal life ==
Schaffer married Jeff Schaffer who is also her professional partner, particularly on The League; their life experiences have often been translated into the plot of the series. They have a daughter, Arwen (named for the character in The Lord of the Rings), born in 2012.
