= EuroTrip =

2004 film by Jeff Schaffer

- Theatrical release poster
- Directed by: Jeff Schaffer
- Written by: Jeff Schaffer; Alec Berg; David Mandel
- Produced by: Alec Berg; David Mandel; Daniel Goldberg; Jackie Marcus
- Starring: Scott Mechlowicz; Jacob Pitts; Michelle Trachtenberg; Travis Wester
- Cinematography: David Eggby
- Edited by: Roger Bondelli
- Music by: James L. Venable
- Production companies: The Montecito Picture Company; Blue Sea Productions
- Distributed by: DreamWorks Pictures (through DreamWorks Distribution LLC; United States and Canada); United International Pictures (International)
- Release date: February 20, 2004
- Running time: 92 minutes
- Countries: United States; Czech Republic
- Language: English
- Budget: $25 million
- Box office: $22.6 million

EuroTrip is a 2004 teen sex comedy film directed by Jeff Schaffer, from a screenplay he wrote with Alec Berg and David Mandel. The film was produced by The Montecito Picture Company and distributed by DreamWorks Pictures. It stars Scott Mechlowicz, Jacob Pitts, Michelle Trachtenberg, and Travis Wester.

Mechlowicz portrays Scotty Thomas, a recent high school graduate from the Youngstown, Ohio area who travels across Europe in search of his German pen pal, Mieke (Jessica Boehrs). Accompanied by his friend Cooper (Pitts) and twin siblings Jenny and Jamie (Trachtenberg and Wester), Scotty's quest takes him to England, France, the Netherlands, Slovakia, Germany, and Italy, encountering awkward, humorous, and embarrassing situations along the way.

EuroTrip was released in theaters on February 20, 2004. It received mixed reviews from critics and underperformed at the box office, grossing $22.6 million against a $25 million budget. It gained popularity through its home video release and eventually attained a cult classic status. It is considered a spiritual successor to the 2000 DreamWorks release Road Trip, but was not originally intended to serve as such, with the original title being Ugly Americans. Before its release, DreamWorks deliberately changed the film's title to EuroTrip, in order to capitalize on the success of Road Trip.

== Plot ==
In the town of Hudson, Ohio, Scotty Thomas is dumped by his girlfriend, Fiona, immediately following his high school graduation in 2004. With his best friend, Cooper Harris, Scotty attends a graduation party that evening, where the band performs a song "Scotty Doesn't Know", detailing the affair Fiona was having with the band's singer, Donny. Scotty returns home drunk and angry and reads an email from his German pen pal, Mieke—whom Scotty calls "Mike"—expressing sympathy for Scotty and suggesting they meet in person. Cooper suggests that "Mike" may be a sexual predator and Scotty tells Mieke to stay away from him. Scotty's younger brother, Bert, informs him that "Mieke" is actually a common German feminine name. Realizing Mieke is a girl and he has feelings for her, Scotty tries to contact her again, but she blocks his email address. Scotty decides to travel to Europe with Cooper to find Mieke and apologize in person.

Scotty and Cooper first arrive in London, where they befriend a Manchester United football hooligan firm, led by Mad Maynard. After a night of drinking, Scotty and Cooper wake up on a bus on their way to Paris with the hooligans. In Paris, they meet up with their classmates, Jenny and Jamie, fraternal twins who are touring Europe together. Jenny and Jamie decide to accompany Scotty and Cooper to find Mieke in Berlin. The group travels to Amsterdam, where Jamie is robbed while receiving oral sex in an alley, losing everyone's money, passports, and train tickets. They attempt to hitchhike to Berlin, but due to a language misunderstanding, they end up in Bratislava. Finding a great exchange rate with the U.S. dollar, the group goes to a nightclub. Drunk on absinthe, Jenny and Jamie make out with each other, witnessed by Scotty and Cooper, and are horrified when they realize what they are doing. The next day, a Slovak man drives them to Berlin. Scotty and Cooper learn from Mieke’s stepfather that she has left with a summer tour group, and will be reachable in Rome for only a short time. Jamie sells his Leica Camera for plane tickets to Rome to find Mieke.

In Rome, the group heads to Vatican City, where Mieke is touring before her summer at sea. Inside the Vatican, Scotty and Cooper search for Mieke and accidentally ring the bell of San Marco, which signals the Pope has died. Scotty appears on a balcony and spots Mieke in the cheering crowd below, who have mistaken him for the newly elected pope; all this happens while the current pope is watching live television. The Swiss guards realize what is going on and detain Scotty and Cooper for their actions. However, the Manchester United football hooligans from London suddenly appear at the Vatican and demand the guards release Scotty and Cooper. Scotty finally introduces himself to Mieke and confesses his love. Mieke is happy to see him, and they have sex in a confessional booth before she leaves on her trip. On the flight back to Ohio, Jenny and Cooper give in to their urges and have sex in the plane's lavatory, while Jamie stays in Europe after being hired by Arthur Frommer.

Scotty moves to Oberlin College in the fall term to begin his pre-med studies. During his phone conversation with Cooper, who is dating Jenny, Cooper asks what Scotty's new roommate looks like. Mieke knocks on the door of his room, having been assigned to the same room because of another misunderstanding about her name. Scotty and Mieke embrace and get into bed together, with Cooper calling for Scott on the other end of a still-open cell phone call and the film's closing with the Absinthe Green Fairy wondering at his own lack of a sex life.

== Cast ==
- Scott Mechlowicz as Scott "Scotty" Thomas:
  A recent high school graduate who inadvertently makes the mistake of thinking his German pen pal Mieke to be a homosexual sex predator, thanks to his limited fluency in speaking German. When he finds out that Mieke is in reality an attractive young woman, Scotty travels across Europe to Berlin to beg for her forgiveness. Mechlowicz described Scotty as a flawed but kindhearted man, who is "very lucky to have such a good group of friends to prop him back up".
- Jacob Pitts as Cooper Harris:
  Scotty's raunchy, libidinous best friend. Pitts described Cooper as a hypersexual man who is "driven by his own base impulses ... which gets everyone else into trouble."
- Michelle Trachtenberg as Jenny:
  Scotty and Cooper's friend and younger twin sister of Jamie. Trachtenberg described Jenny as both book savvy and a risk-taker. "She is more willing to take a chance or go on an adventure, whereas Jamie always has to be convinced", said Trachtenberg. As she was 18 years old at the time of the film's release, Trachtenberg was the only main actor in the cast who was an actual teenager, while the rest of the cast were in their 20s or older.
- Travis Wester as Jamie:
  Jenny's older twin brother. Wester described Jamie as a lifelong learner whose aspiration is "the accumulation and dissemination of knowledge".
- Jessica Boehrs as Mieke Schmidt:
  Scotty's German pen pal. Boehrs made her film debut with EuroTrip.

The cast also includes Vinnie Jones as Mad Maynard (leader of the Manchester United football hooligans), Lucy Lawless as Madame Vandersexxx (a sex-club dominatrix), Patrick Malahide as Arthur Frommer, Diedrich Bader as Mugger, Fred Armisen as Creepy Italian Guy, Kristin Kreuk as Fiona (Scotty's ex-girlfriend), Nial Iskhakov as Bert Thomas (Scotty's younger brother), Matt Damon as Donny (Fiona's new boyfriend), J. P. Manoux as Robot Man, Rade Šerbedžija as Tibor, Jana Pallaske as Anna the Camera Store girl, and Steve Hytner as the Absinthe Green Fairy. Jeffrey Tambor (uncredited) and Cathy Meils were cast as Mr. and Mrs. Thomas, respectively.

== Production ==
Writers David Mandel, Alec Berg, and Jeff Schaffer were doing work as script doctors when in Mandel's words they concluded “Boy, comedy directors aren’t great, and it doesn’t seem to take a lot to be a comedy director. The bar is low — why not us?”. So they decided to write a screenplay reminiscent of the sex comedies they grew up watching, that could also be done in a small budget so they could also direct. Already with an idea of a trip to Europe after pitching this for an American Pie sequel, the trio wrote it while working on The Cat in the Hat, incorporating many stories from their friends in similar trips. The resulting spec script Ugly Americans got into a bidding war before Ivan Reitman and DreamWorks acquired it in June 2002, with a deal that allowed Mandel, Berg and Schaffer to direct and also that production had to start in the following year. The trio attempted to send the project to New Line Cinema once DreamWorks founder Steven Spielberg objected to a scene where Cooper mistook Anne Frank House for a brothel, given he is one of the museum's biggest donors, but the other studio also balked at the idea, so the scene was replaced in the Amsterdam sequence with one involving a dominatrix. The Directors Guild of America forbade the trio from sharing the credit. Schaffer earned the honor of receiving sole credit when a production assistant picked his name out of a hat.

Filming begun in February 2003. Aside from the nude beach in the German city of Rostock, all scenes were filmed in Prague, Czech Republic. The opening scenes set in Ohio were filmed at the International School of Prague. The scene where the main characters are boarding at the Paris railway station was filmed in Prague's main railway station (Praha hlavní nádraží). The scene inside Vatican City was actually filmed in National Museum in Prague. The scenes with a German lorry driver were taken at the then-unfinished D5 motorway near Plzeň. An air base in Milovice was used for Bratislava for its ravaged look, though once the crew returned to the location and found it clean, broken windows and graffiti had to be added back. For the opening scene at the party, production had to look all over Prague for a house with a backyard, and Red Cups were brought from the United States. Arthur Frommer was initially approached to cameo as himself in the film; due to scheduling difficulties the role would ultimately be played by Patrick Malahide.

Due to Screen Actors Guild rules that dictated every American actor had to be paid for travel and accommodations - as Berg put it, "to get somebody to come from America to deliver one line, it’s like $20,000." - extras were Czech, and most American actors were already in Prague to begin with. This included Matt Damon, who was filming The Brothers Grimm in Prague and agreed to play the punk singer, given he could shave his head for the wig he wore in Grimm; and Lucy Lawless, invited as she prepared to return to New Zealand for a one-day cameo as the dominatrix Madame Vandersexxx. For her role, Lawless used a fake European accent, although she can be heard speaking in her normal accent during the end credits blooper reel. The costume Lawless used for the film was later auctioned to charity in 2004. Lawless noted that the seductive image of Xena and her character in this film were far removed from her real life, saying in 2004 "I know I have this weird, raunchy image (laughs). This simply isn't true, but its fun to play those bad girls. They are in me somewhere. I'm so damn suburban that it isn’t even funny." American actors flown in included Absinthe Fairy portrayer Steve Hytner, who the directors met working in Seinfeld, and a few that were originally planned to use actors from the portrayed cities - "Either everybody stunk, or in the case of the French, they were just offended and didn’t want to play the role" - such as J.P. Manoux as a French mime and Fred Armisen as a groping Italian.

Originally, the Vatican sequence had Mieke not caring about Scott's efforts in meeting her to subvert the typical romantic comedy conclusion. Even if they eventually got together in the later scene where she becomes his roommate, test audiences reacted negatively, so during reshoots the directors replaced it with the scene of both having sex in a confessional booth. Post-production had DreamWorks executives frustrated at the content, eventually conceiving the title change from Ugly Americans to EuroTrip to lure in fans of Road Trip, ironically getting backlash from said film's director Todd Phillips. To ensure a high score at the final test screening that would allow its release, the directors invited "anyone we knew who was younger than us and wasn’t in the [film] business", including Harvard Lampoon writers, and asked some of the men to mark in the post-screening query that they were women to improve the score in said demographic.

== Release and reception ==
=== Critical response ===
Review aggregation website Rotten Tomatoes gives EuroTrip a 46% rating based on 119 reviews, and an average of 5.1/10. The site's critical consensus says, "A trip worth taking if one's not offended by gratuitous nudity and bad taste." On Metacritic, the film scored 45 out of 100 based on 30 reviews, indicating "mixed or average" reviews.

In her review for Salon, Stephanie Zacharek wrote, "The giddy ridiculousness of Eurotrip is a pleasant surprise: The picture starts out slow and unsteady in its rhythms. But just when you begin to wonder if it’s ever going to get funny, or if it’s going to be merely desperate all the way through, it lifts off like a wobbly helicopter—and somehow it keeps flying."

In the New York Times, Elvis Mitchell wrote that "almost every girl in the movie with fewer than 10 lines to speak has to take her top off." In his review for Village Voice, Michael Miller criticized the film for its "constant anxiety that women might turn out to be men and vice versa."

=== Box office ===
The film was released in the United States and Canada on February 20, 2004, in 2,512 theaters. Over its opening weekend, the film grossed $6.7 million, coming in fifth place there. Throughout its run, it grossed $17.8 million in the United States and Canada and $4.8 million in other territories, for a worldwide total of $22.6 million. The film's theatrical earnings finished 117th for the year of 2004 in the U.S. and Canada, and 136th for the year worldwide.

=== Home media ===
The film was released on DVD in the United States on June 1, 2004, by DreamWorks Home Entertainment. It came in both an R-rated theatrical version (90 minutes) and an "Unrated" extended version (92 minutes). The Unrated version featured stronger nudity, including shots of men's bare penises at a nudist beach, and a scene in a hot tub where a woman's bare-naked breasts are rubbed.

In February 2006, Viacom (now known as Paramount Skydance) acquired the rights to EuroTrip and all 58 other live-action films DreamWorks had released since 1997, following its $1.6 billion acquisition of the studio's live-action film and television library. The deal included the rights to Road Trip, which were also held by DreamWorks prior to 2006. The theatrical version of EuroTrip was released on Blu-ray in 2013. The Unrated extended edition was released on Blu-ray by Paramount Home Entertainment in 2022. The film was made available on Paramount's subscription streaming service Paramount+, which launched in 2021, in addition to being made available on their free streaming service Pluto TV. The version on streaming services is the theatrical cut rather than the Unrated version.

=== Legacy ===
Although not as successful at the box office as the producers' Road Trip (2000), EuroTrip did well on home video and became a cult classic. (Note: Multiple references, including:) Ultra Culture blogger Charlie Lyne, who introduced a screening of the film in 2011 at the Institute of Contemporary Arts, wrote in 2012 that "EuroTrip is satire at its most brazenly self-loathing and audaciously entertaining".

Matt Damon reportedly has said that despite appearing in notable films like Saving Private Ryan, The Talented Mr. Ripley, and the Bourne franchise, fans often repeat "Scotty doesn't know!" to him.

== Soundtrack ==
A soundtrack album for the film was released on February 24, 2004. Road Trip had its soundtrack handled by DreamWorks' own label DreamWorks Records, although this album was instead handled by soundtrack specialty label Milan Records. DreamWorks Records had been sold to Universal Music Group in November 2003 for $100 million, and would be shut down by 2005.

Eurotrip

Soundtrack album by various artists
- Released: February 24, 2004
- Genres: Punk rock; pop
- Label: Milan

Professional ratings
Review scores
Source	Rating
AllMusic	2.5/5 stars

=== Album track listing ===
1. "Scotty Doesn't Know" – Lustra
2. "My Generation" – Chapeaumelon (The Who cover)
3. "Wild One" – Wakefield
4. "99 Red Balloons" – Goldfinger (Nena cover)
5. "In the City" – The Jam
6. "Ça Plane Pour Moi" - Plastic Bertrand
7. "Shooting Stars" – Cauterize
8. "Are You Gonna Be My Girl" – Jet
9. "Nonchalant" – Chapeaumelon
10. "Scotty Doesn't Know" (Euro Version) – MC Jeffsky
11. "Make My Dreams Come True" – Apollo 440
12. "Du" – David Hasselhoff (Peter Maffay cover)
13. "Les Promesses" – Autour De Lucie
14. "I Love Marijuana" – Linval Thompson
15. "Turn It Up" – Ugly Duckling
16. "Get Loose" – The Salads
17. "England 5, Germany 1" – The Business
18. "Guinness Boys" – The Business
19. "9 to 5 (Morning Train)" – Sheena Easton

== See also ==
- National Lampoon's European Vacation (1985)
