= Stephen Rannazzisi =

American actor and stand-up comedian (born 1977)

- Born: July 4, 1977 (age 49); Smithtown, New York, U.S.
- Education: State University of New York Oneonta (BS)
- Occupations: Actor, stand-up comedian
- Years active: 2001–present
- Spouse: Tracy Rannazzisi (m. 2006)
- Children: 2

Stephen Rannazzisi (born July 4, 1977) is an American actor and stand-up comedian. He acted in the FXX comedy series The League as Kevin MacArthur.

== Career ==
Rannazzisi's comedy career began in 2001 after he moved from New York to Los Angeles. In 2003, he became a cast member on the MTV show Punk'd where he appeared alongside creator and host Ashton Kutcher.

Following the success of Punk'D, Rannazzisi starred in the 2006 TV series Big Day. He appeared in the 2009 blockbuster comedy Paul Blart: Mall Cop before getting his big break as Kevin MacArthur in The League, which aired on FXX from October 2009 to December 2015. He appears in comedian Ray Harrington's 2015 documentary Be a Man.

He appeared as a contestant on Roast Battles in 2016, and that same year was on an episode of New Girl as Todd Ploons. His most recent acting role was in 2020, when he appeared twice on Brews Brothers.

In the 2020s Rannazzisi has worked as a stand-up comedian and become a frequent guest on podcasts such as Legion of Skanks and Story WarZ. In 2026 Rannazzisi became the third seat host on Legion of Skanks.

== Personal life ==
Rannazzisi, born in Smithtown, New York, on July 4, 1977, briefly attended the Catholic St. Anthony's High School in South Huntington, New York, on Long Island, leaving after a year in what he called a mutual decision. He went on to graduate from Smithtown High School in 1996. Rannazzisi graduated from State University of New York at Oneonta, where he majored in communications. He is of Italian and Irish descent.

== 9/11 controversy ==
Rannazzisi claimed to have worked at finance firm Merrill Lynch on the 54th floor, and described his alleged experience escaping the building during the September 11 Attacks. He also said the events inspired him to move to Los Angeles and pursue stand-up comedy.

In September 2015, Rannazzisi said his story was a lie after being contacted by a New York Times reporter who was investigating the veracity of his account. Rannazzisi was never employed by Merrill Lynch, which did not even have offices in the World Trade Center. In fact, Rannazzisi was working in a building in Midtown Manhattan on September 11, 2001, and never entered the World Trade Center on 9/11.

Rannazzisi released a statement saying: "I told people that I was in one of the World Trade Center towers on 9/11. It wasn't true. I was in Manhattan but working in a building in Midtown and I was not at the Trade Center on that day ... I don't know why I said this. This was inexcusable. I am truly, truly sorry. ... It is to the victims of 9/11 and to the people that love them—and the people that love me—that I ask for forgiveness."

He appeared on The Howard Stern Show to clear up the story, and said he invented the lie as an attempt to "fit in" and "survive with the new LA crowd" after moving to a new city.

== Filmography ==
Film
Year	Title	Role	Notes
2004	The Fax	Whitley	Short film
2005	Lost Reality 2	Billy Barnes	
2006	For Your Consideration	Studio gate guard	
2009	Paul Blart: Mall Cop	Stuart	
2009	Imagine That	Noah Kulick	
2010	Homewrecker	Charles	
2018	Avengers of Justice: Farce Wars	Superbat	

Television
Year	Title	Role	Notes
2003	Punk'd	Field Agent	5 episodes
2005	Kitchen Confidential	Banker	Episode: "Aftermath"
2006–07	Big Day	Skobo	Main role; 12 episodes
2008–09	Samantha Who?	Seth Barber	6 episodes
2009	Trust Me	Jonah Quarles	Episode: "But Wait, There's More"
2009–2015	The League	Kevin MacArthur	Main role
2010	Outsourced	Brad Dempsey	Episode: "Temporary Monsanity"; uncredited
2011	Love Bites	Kyle	2 episodes
2016	Roast Battles	Himself	Episode: "Night One"
2016	New Girl	Todd Ploons	Episode: "No Girl"
2017	Curb Your Enthusiasm	Head Chef	Episode: "A Disturbance In The Kitchen"
2018	Me, Myself & I	Adult Phil	Episode: Phil Ricozzi
2020	Brews Brothers	Cole	2 episodes

Web
Year	Title	Role	Notes
2012–13	Daddy Knows Best	Steve	Main role; 7 episodes
