= The League =

American television sitcom (2009–2015)

- Genre: Sitcom
- Created by: Jeff Schaffer; Jackie Schaffer
- Directed by: Jeff Schaffer; Jackie Schaffer
- Starring: Mark Duplass; Nick Kroll; Katie Aselton; Paul Scheer; Stephen Rannazzisi; Jon Lajoie
- Country of origin: United States
- Original language: English
- No. of seasons: 7
- No. of episodes: 84 (list of episodes)

Production
- Executive producers: Jeff Schaffer; Jackie Schaffer
- Running time: 20–30 minutes
- Production companies: Chicken Sticks; FX Productions

Original release
- Network: FX
- Release: October 29, 2009 – December 20, 2012
- Network: FXX
- Release: September 4, 2013 – December 9, 2015

The League is an American television sitcom that aired on FX and later FXX from October 29, 2009, to December 9, 2015, for a total of seven seasons. The series, set in Chicago, is a semi-improvised comedy show about a fantasy football league, its members, and their everyday lives.

== Premise ==
Set in Chicago, the series revolves around six friends who participate in a fantasy football league. The show follows the friends, who would do anything to win, while also dealing with the after effects of their pranks and often dangerous antics they perform on one another.

== Episodes ==
Season	Episodes	Originally released		
Season	Episodes	First released	Last released	Network
1	6	October 29, 2009	December 10, 2009	FX
2	13	September 16, 2010	December 9, 2010	FX
3	13	October 6, 2011	December 22, 2011	FX
4	13	October 11, 2012	December 20, 2012	FX
5	13	September 4, 2013	November 20, 2013	FXX
6	13	September 3, 2014	November 19, 2014	FXX
7	13	September 9, 2015	December 9, 2015	FXX

== Cast ==
=== Main characters ===
- Mark Duplass as Peter "Pete" Eckhart: Three-time league champion who separates from his wife Meegan (Leslie Bibb) in the pilot episode. Several episodes revolve around his interaction with women. Pete is known for tricking his gullible friends (particularly Taco and Andre) into making poor fantasy-football trades they call "trade rapes." He works in a cubicle in sales, avoiding doing actual work as much as possible, though in the season 5 episode "The Automatic Faucet" he declares he is done with fantasy football and focuses solely on work—except for when he helps his boss set up a team for an office project much like he did with his fantasy-football lineup, which actually earns him a promotion. In Season 7, he becomes a referee. He creates, and is commissioner of, the "Sacko", the "worst-team" trophy created during the episode "The Reunion". He still holds the North Winnetka High School pole-vault record. He once got a "Fear Boner" when he bought Chicago Bears tickets from a man in the park. In the series finale, Pete wins $1 million and retires into the sunset, winning the beach house. It is also revealed that Pete, not Andre, is the father of Meegan's child.
- Nick Kroll as Rodney Ruxin: A Jewish product-liability attorney, he is just as ruthless and obnoxious in the League as he is in the courtroom. He "out-kicked his coverage" with his wife Sofia, so goes to great lengths to please her. He is constantly torn between his need to please her and his desire to crush his League opponents. In many episodes, and all of season 3, Ruxin is extremely paranoid, often thinking that his opponents are "trying to get into his head", or that other League members are "in collusion" to cheat him, but his paranoid hunches have been correct at least twice: in "Expert Witness" and "The Lockout." In "The Bounce Test," he describes his own appearance: "I look like a Nazi propaganda cartoon of a Jew." He and Sofia have a son named Geoffrey ("Baby Geoffrey"). He hates being called Rodney, preferring to be called Ruxin; his sister Rebecca (Lizzy Caplan) calls him the "Rod-Man" and Taco sometimes calls him "Ruspin," two nicknames he finds equally unfavorable. He wins the season-2 League championship. In high school his reputation for dating large women earned him the nickname "The Herdsman." He inherited his sarcastic nature from his father Rupert (Jeff Goldblum), who also prefers to be called Ruxin. After catching Kevin in his "clown car of lies," he declares season 3 to be null and void and claims himself winner via default after miraculously healing (upon catching sight of Shiva) from the after-effects of a stress-induced stroke from discovering the collusion. He then agrees that the events of season 3 of the TV show—season 7 of their actual League-—would count in exchange for becoming the new league commissioner—and for the naming rights to Kevin and Jenny's newborn, which he trades to Taco for his #1 draft pick. He is commissioner only in season 4. Ruxin is a graduate of Northwestern University.
- Katie Aselton as Jenny MacArthur (née Banger): Kevin's wife, who helps him run his team and has as much enthusiasm for the League as the actual members do during season 1. When Kevin loses a bet to Pete in season 1, Jenny is forced to streak since she is clearly the manager for Kevin's team. In season 2, Jenny wants her own team for the League, but the members vote to give the vacant spot to Ruxin's brother-in-law Rafi; angered, Jenny seeks revenge by helping Ruxin draft instead. She is introduced into the League during that season to replace Rafi and eventually loses to Ruxin's team in the Shiva Bowl. Her foul mouth is well equal to Kevin's and their daughter Ellie already takes after them. At the end of Season 3, she tells Kevin that their second child is on the way. She gives birth to their son in the Season-4 premiere. She defeats Andre in Season 5's Shiva Bowl.
- Paul Scheer as Dr. Andre Nowzick: A bald, rich plastic surgeon whose naïveté makes him the brunt of many jokes. He wears what he believes to be trendy clothing, for which his friends mercilessly mock him. He tries to be cool by using current slang, particularly the jargon of hip-hop culture, but his friends constantly rebuke him, as do others, such as professional football player Chad Johnson. Andre wins the Shiva at the end of season 1 after entering a committed relationship with Shivakamini Somakandarkram (the namesake of the League trophy). In the season-2 premiere, Andre renames the trophy "the Dre"; the others quickly rename it "the SheDre." The worship of a false god in "the Dre" results in bad luck, which is nicknamed "DrAIDS." This results in the worst record in the League and he quickly falls from first to worst. As the Sacko recipient, he receives innumerable punishments that range from embarrassing to cruel. For instance, in season 3 he's locked out of his apartment while Dirty Randy (Seth Rogen) creates a low-budget porno based loosely on Andre's life. Andre's sister Heather (Sarah Silverman) has had sex with everyone in the League except Andre, Jenny, and Ruxin. Andre was engaged to his interior decorator Trixie Von Stein (Jayma Mays) but their wedding was sabotaged by the League. He also starts a winebar, Menage a Cinq, with fellow League member Russell, but Russell's sex addiction spoils things. In season 7, Andre dates, then marries, Pete's ex-wife Meegan.
- Stephen Rannazzisi as Kevin MacArthur: An assistant district attorney and Pete's best friend, Kevin is the league commissioner from Seasons 1–3. He returns to commissioner in season 5. Because he has difficulty competing in the league on his own, he often takes football knowledge from his wife Jenny; the rest of the League teases him incessantly for this. Jenny eventually joins the League herself, replacing Ruxin's brother-in-law Rafi. At the series' beginning, he has never won the Shiva, the award given to the League winners (named after Shivakamini Somakandarkram, a high-school classmate to whom Kevin lost his virginity). In college, he got a "Fear Boner" when he thought he was about to be mugged by somebody who was only asking for directions. Kevin wins in the season-3, but Ruxin declares the entire season null because of collusion and lies, until Kevin agrees to give Ruxin the commissioner role and naming rights to his newborn. Kevin has been "highnotized" (hypnotized under the influence of marijuana) by his brother Taco, which causes Kevin to faint if Taco says the word "pumpernickel." Jenny and Pete have also similarly programmed Kevin, Jenny by using dog-training techniques and Pete by clicking a retractable ballpoint pen. Kevin has a young daughter named Ellie whose foul mouth comes from her parents, and a son born in Season 4's first episode and named Chalupa Batman by his Uncle Taco, but renamed Christopher Benjamin by his parents in the next episode. Rafi, Ruxin's brother-in-law, constantly calls him 'Brian' instead of Kevin.
- Jon Lajoie as Taco MacArthur: Kevin's younger brother, a perpetually stoned, unemployed musician. He does not care or know much about American football; he attempts to draft Canadian football players and tends to draft placekickers. He has won the League championship at least once, in 2006, evident by his handwritten name on the trophy. He hooks up with women easily, and lives via handouts from Kevin and his "Eskimo family tree" (people who have slept with women he has slept with), and making his own food (thousand-year-old eggs) and personal-hygiene products, like deodorant. He also makes ringtones (Horse Orgasm or, "Horsegasm"). He takes martial arts, specializing in use of a naginata (a long pole with a blade at the end) and studies of naginatajutsu. He means well but his acts of kindness usually have disastrous results. He is perhaps the most emotional member of the league, prone to crying when his feelings are hurt. In the unrated version of season 1, Ruxin claimed that the reason Taco is such a "frittata" is because they made him smoke marijuana when he was 8. Between seasons 2 and 3, Taco travels around the world and becomes a soap-opera star in Algeria playing a stupid American. He enjoys keeping "guest bongs" in all of his friends' homes for him to use. In season 4, it's revealed that he owns the domain name dallascowboys.com, which Dallas Cowboys owner Jerry Jones purchases for $250,000. In Season 5 he turns his dead uncle's van into multiple unsuccessful small businesses. It is also revealed that when he is not high he is actually very intelligent, probably the most intelligent member of the League. In season 6, his Eskimo-Brother DataBase ends up making him a lot of money and he starts other business ventures after Mark Cuban buys it from him for $1.1 million.

=== Recurring characters ===
- Nadine Velazquez as Sofia Ruxin, Ruxin's Latina wife. She has a close friendship with Taco, which Ruxin cannot stand. She dies while undergoing vaginal rejuvenation in Puerto Rico.
- Jason Mantzoukas as Rafi, Sofia's deranged, obnoxious brother, aka "Bro-lo el Cuñado." Best friend and possible lover of porn director Dirty Randy. He shared a bed with Sofia until she was 18. He was an altar boy as a child, but had to quit after he raped a priest. He always calls Pete "Tall Guy" and believes Kevin's name is Brian. His residence has a large number of "load-bearing chairs" stacked up and has a "toilet-kitchen." Rafi stores a never-ending supply of hotdogs in his pants, referring to them as "pocket dogs." He is a diabetic. He gets "murder boners" when practicing his MMA skills and gets a "war boner" when playing paintball. He thinks that he is Baby Geoffrey's true father. Occasionally he has suggested that he and Sofia shared an incestuous relationship in the past (not directly denied by Sofia). Many times when he vomits, he defecates; many times when he defecates, he orgasms. Ruxin's sarcasm led him to take on the role of Bobbum Man in real life. He is apparently killed by Dirty Randy in a duel. In Season 6's "When Rafi Met Randy," it is revealed Rafi was once a normal family man until Randy's business partner fell to his death on top of Rafi's wife and two sons, killing them all. After numerous suicide attempts, Rafi was checked into a mental asylum along with Randy. An overzealous nurse subjected them both to shock therapy that would alter their minds and result in their current deranged states. Immediately after Randy revealed that he was responsible for the deaths of Rafi's family, Rafi was subjected to a partial lobotomy that made him forget them completely. It is also revealed how Rafi was returned to life via special means.
- Alina Foley as Ellie MacArthur, Jenny and Kevin's young daughter. She has inherited her parents' profane language, which got her in trouble with her first grade teacher, Ms. Martin.
- Janina Gavankar as Shivakamini Somakandarkram, a doctor who was the valedictorian of most of the League members' graduating high school class. She is a urologist, specializing in genital reconstruction. She usually appears on season finales, as she's the "patron deity" of the League's trophy. They each present an item to the trophy, which contains a high school photo of her. The only odd episode out is "The High School Reunion" when she was present with the league, revealing in the process that Pete's mother's windshield was not busted by a high school friend but rather by Kevin when he lost his virginity to Shiva. Shiva cursed the 2012 season of the League because they would not take her picture off the trophy. She also dated Andre towards the end of Season 1.
- Adam Karchmer as Geoffrey Ruxin, Ruxin and Sofia's son. Ruxin calls him "Baby Geoffrey."
- Rob Huebel as Dr. Russell Deramo, a friend of the gang. He first appears in "The Draft," where he attends Andre's party. He returns in "The Kluneberg," where it is revealed that he moved to New York but recently returned, saying New York was too crowded and too full of "crazy people." He later reveals that he is a sex addict and invites Jenny to join his league. He later replaces her with Rafi, allowing her to join the League. In Season 5, he is a member of Rafi's Domination League with Dirty Randy. He is introduced into the League in Season 6 as a replacement for Ted, claiming his sex addiction is gone due to his passion for wine. He opens a wine bar known as Ménage a Cinq with Andre, but the business fails when his sex addiction relapses.
- Leslie Bibb as Meegan Eckhart, Pete's abrasive ex-wife. They fought constantly. After she gave away his lucky draft shirt, Pete realized that they were not meant to be together and they separated. They finalized the divorce, and she was left with only the house. She had requested their The Curious Case of Benjamin Button DVD, presumably knowing that it contained a disc with a sex video she had made with Pete, but Pete had already snuck into her house and stolen it, aided by Kevin; Pete never gives it back. She was later seen dating an older man named Ted. She returns in Season 7, where it is revealed that she is now dating Andre, whom she later marries.
- Seth Rogen as Dirty Randy – Rafi's friend who works as a librarian and a pornographer. He works at the library for the infrastructure and says "it's a place where you can find desperate people and you can pay them in drugs and alcohol to work as part of the porn production team." Before he was a porn director he was homeless, kicked out of the military, a crack dealer, and a porn location scout. He met Rafi in an asylum, an experience he describes as "very romantic." He believes that puns "are as vital to the porn business as they are to the pet shop and children's barbershop industries." He directed such movies as the controversial "Shitler's List" (the controversy was that it was shot in black and white), "Toe-Bangers 3" (the SEAL Team Six member who shot Osama bin Laden found a copy of it in the compound, but the Government will not release the footage), "Dr. Andre Nodick," and "12.12.12: The Mayan Cockandlips" (filmed in the loft Deion Sanders bought from Andre). In Season 5, he is also a member of Rafi's "Domination League." He threatens Ruxin with a trident made from dildos. In Season 6's "When Rafi Met Randy," Randy is revealed to have been a successful businessman who accidentally knocked his partner off a construction building where the man crushed the family of a then-normal Rafi. The two were committed to the same mental institution where numerous shock therapy sessions resulted in their deranged states. When Randy realized he was responsible for the death of Rafi's family, he used another shock session to induce him to forget about them.
- Brie Larson as Ashley, Baby Geoffrey's former au pair who was hired due to her good looks. Pete quickly begins sleeping with her, which causes her to neglect her au pair duties. Ruxin wants to fire her, but she extorts him by threatening to tell Sofia that he was masturbating to her photo (he was actually wiping pee off his pants) unless he continues to pay her for doing nothing. To get her to quit, Ruxin enlisted Rafi to hit on her, which ends up backfiring when she brings Rafi into bed with her and Pete to do the "Golden Gate Bridge." Rafi eventually talks her into quitting her job and "moving in" with him at Ruxin's home.
- Ike Barinholtz as Frank "The Body" Gibiatti – Ruxin's high school rival. His sister Gina "dated" Pete for a while. The Body gave (and still gives) the guys a hard time.
- Jayma Mays as Trixie – Andre's former interior decorator and then fiancée. She is allergic to his semen. She breaks off the engagement after discovering the Secret Draft on her wedding weekend, then blinding herself with Andre's semen-filled pee bib while crying. Taco calls her Pixie instead of Trixie.
- Jeff Goldblum as Rupert Ruxin – Rodney's father.
- Will Forte as Chuck – One of the League's two out-of-town members, a recovering alcoholic whom they nicknamed "Two-Nut Chuck." In the Season 5 premiere, it is mentioned that he is in rehab again. In the Season 7 premiere, Chuck reveals that he has testicular cancer.
- Brooklyn Decker as Gina Gibiatti – Frank Gibiatti's sister who briefly dates Pete and then Adrian Peterson.
- Adam Brody as Ted Rappaport – The other out-of-town League member and Season 4 Shiva winner. Ted had AIDS and died after being hit by a car while insulting Kevin via FaceTime.
- Jorma Taccone as Spazz – a member of Rafi's Domination League.
- June Diane Raphael as Pam, a nurse at the mental institution where Rafi was committed; the actress appears in a different episode as Ellie's teacher.
- Zach Woods as Lane, a suicidal acquaintance of Pete's.
- Rob Riggle as Bethesda. Partner at Ruxin's firm and coach of Geoffrey's Little League baseball team.

=== Notable guest stars ===
- Matt Walsh as Mr. Friedman - "Freaky" Friedman, "the Oracle's" father. (Season 1 - Pilot Episode)
- Thomas Lennon as Bryce – Pete and Meegan's divorce mediator.
- Meghan Markle as Meghan - Pete meets her in a bar shortly after leaving Meegan.
- Bobby Lee as Lee Wei Lee – a local "frittata" and patron of a local Chinese restaurant who makes fun of Ruxin.
- Craig Bierko as Craig O'Connor – Kevin's boss.
- Brooke Nevin as Lily — Kevin's co-worker, whom he calls "goody-two-shoes;" also Taco's girlfriend, briefly.
- Janet Montgomery as Ambrosia – Las Vegas stripper who has a vast knowledge of fantasy football.
- Lake Bell as Brooke – Pete's girlfriend; Kevin's ex-girlfriend. Nicknamed "The White Knuckler."
- Alison Becker as Darcy - A practicing Wiccan that Pete went out with on Halloween.
- Jamey Sheridan as Ted – Meegan's new, significantly older, boyfriend who has a heart attack at Ruxin's anniversary party.
- Michael Hitchcock as Ed - A man Pete meets in the park who offers him Bears tickets; Pete got a Fear Boner worrying that Ed was gay and propositioning him until he saw Ed's wife and son.
- Alia Shawkat as April – A courtroom artist and one of Taco's girlfriends.
- Martin Starr as Stu Pompeu – Pete's high school rival, nicknamed "Box of Frogs." Pete had believed that Stu broke his mom's car's window and left a used condom behind, although it was actually Kevin losing his virginity to Shiva. Stu had offered Pete a high-paying job at their high school reunion, but withdrew the offer after Pete mistakenly sought revenge against him.
- Lindsay Sloane as Lindsey Martin - Ellie's teacher who was also dating Pete. Breaks Pete's penis because of her constant kegel exercises.
- Lloyd Ahlquist as Dr. Andre NoDick — Dirty Randy's porn star.
- Kayden Kross as Kayden, a porn star in the Dr. Andre NoDick porno.
- Rick Shapiro as Bum – A homeless man who preferred a bus bench advertising Jenny's Real Estate business.
- Desi Lydic as Waitress — Hooked up with Pete during "The Marathon" episode.
- Ray Liotta as Mr. Hudabega – Ruxin's germaphobic boss at his law firm.
- Keegan-Michael Key as Steve "Carmenjello" – A janitor Andre attempts to befriend after unintentionally upsetting him by calling him "Carmenjello," thinking it was his name rather than the name of the janitorial service for which he works. Kevin takes a picture of his skin and says "it's the perfect shade of cinnamon," which also offends him.
- Sarah Silverman as Heather Nowzick – Andre's promiscuous sister. She has slept with Taco, Kevin, Pete, and Ruxin's father.
- Eliza Dushku as Kristen – Kevin's Krav Maga instructor.
- Deon Cole as Mugger – Tries to rob Kevin and Kristen after their Krav Maga class.
- T.J. Miller as Gabriel – A member of a religious cult called "The Light of Genesis" who tries to recruit Ruxin.
- Thomas Middleditch as Julian - Another member of "The Light of Genesis".
- Brett Gelman as Gavin – An ex-convict Kevin prosecuted, the father of Ellie's friend Chloe.
- Melissa Ordway as Sutton - A friend of the League and a sexual interest of Taco and Pete.
- Chris Tallman as Mr. Swall – Human-resources representative at Ruxin's firm.
- Allison Williams as Danielle – Pete's controlling girlfriend. Decides to make Pete's roster and beer selections.
- Marianne Muellerleile as Bernice, a hospital nurse who tends to Ruxin after his stroke; when Rafi visits Ruxin, he hits on Bernice.
- Timothy Olyphant as Wesley – A sushi chef at Spuki Sushi. He is white, acts Asian, and claims to be from O-ma-ha.
- Ryan Hansen as Ben – Jenny's ex-boyfriend, Kevin and Andre's friend. In Season 4, it is divulged that he and Jenny once had sex 6 times in one day ("The Freezeout").
- Julia Duffy as Martha - Kevin and Taco's mother who dislikes Jenny and considers Taco the more successful of her sons, seemingly oblivious to his shortcomings.
- Kristin Cavallari as herself – Appears in Kevin and Jenny's "Mommy & Me" class. Jenny steals her breast milk.
- Ken Marino as Donnie "The Seed" Sadowski – A bully from high school who used to jerk off in his hand and rub it on victims' heads. Friends with Frank Gibiatti.
- Andrea Savage as Gail - Swim instructor for Baby Geoffrey.
- J. B. Smoove as Wheelchair Guy (DeRon)– Buys the last pair of Vapora Sport Sneakers out from under Pete, who steals the sneakers back.
- Robert Wagner as Gumpa Duke - Pete's promiscuous grandpa who pretends to be losing his mind so he can hook up at the retirement home.
- Lee Meriwether as Gumma Eve - Pete's grandma, wife of Gumpa Duke.
- John Ross Bowie as Dr. Pete Wyland - Gives Kevin a colonoscopy. Insists on being called Pete and has a nurse named Jenny.
- Bob Odenkirk as Mall Manager – Fights with Taco over Krampus and Ruxin over Christmas music.
- Griffin Dunne and Glenne Headly as Andre's parents.
- Snoop Dogg as himself, one of Taco's "Eskimo Brothers."
- Christine Lakin as "Pete's girl."
- Dana White as The Falcon's enforcer. Kills Dirty Randy's and Rafi's friend Spazz.
- Will Sasso as Police Officer. Rafi and Dirty Randy thinks he is a Nazi.
- Kevin Nealon as Chuck Falcon. Porn Kingpin who is known as the Steve Jobs of Porn. Killed by Dirty Randy.
- Ali Larter as Georgia Thompson. Unhappily married woman who initiates an affair with Pete.
- Erin Heatherton as Coach Crowley. Ellie's intimidating basketball coach.
- Lizzy Caplan as Rebecca Ruxin - Rodney's sister.
- Aziz Ansari as Dr. Hector Rocha, Andre's plastic-surgery rival.
- Mark Cuban as himself. Buys the Eskimo Brother Database from Taco.
- Brenda Song as Rosette - Pete's girlfriend who constantly wants to hold hands.
- Jerry O'Connell as Father Muldoon - The MacArthurs' priest.
- Erinn Hayes as Heather - Pete's girlfriend with epilepsy.
- Maria Thayer as Cheryl - Jenny's rival as a mom.
- Anna Camp as Penny - Pete's girlfriend who grooms Andre's cat.
- Corbin Bernsen as Bruce Banger - Jenny's father.
- Rich Fulcher as Luther the Hobo - Homeless dressing-gown-wearing heckler in "The Bringer Show."
- Dan Castellaneta as Dr. Harvat - Lane's doctor.
- Antonio Sabato Jr. as Father Zaragosa - the priest from Sofia's church.
- Jerry Minor as Greg - inmate at the mental institution who ended up being a figment of Rafi's imagination.
- Neil Casey as Neil - an inmate at the mental institution where Rafi was committed.
- Christopher McDonald as Judge Hardy - a judge that disapproves of Kevin and Ruxin's dishonesty.
- Arielle Kebbel as Libby - a woman that Pete dated in three episodes of season 7.
- Deanna Russo as Brittany Barber - Andre's college crush who he tries to avoid performing surgery.
- Casey Wilson as Claire - a psychotic Uber driver who begins stalking Andre.
- Milo Ventimiglia as Milo Ventimiglia- actor on the gang's favorite TV show, "The Block."
- Nicky Whelan as L-E, a character on the gangs favorite TV show, "The Block."
- Larry David as an older Ruxin in a dream in the final episode.
- Dov Davidoff as Sergeant Panico - An unstable military veteran friend of Taco's who temporarily assumes control of his team.

==== Notable NFL players and analysts as guest stars ====
- Fox NFL analyst and former Pittsburgh Steelers quarterback Terry Bradshaw in season 1 episode 3 "Sunday at Ruxin's".
- San Diego Chargers tight end Antonio Gates in season 1 episode 4 'Mr. McGibblets" and the final episode of season 6 "The Beach House".
- Then-Cincinnati Bengals wide receiver Chad Johnson in season 2 episode 1 "Vegas Draft".
- Then-Cleveland Browns kick return specialist Josh Cribbs and Baltimore Ravens linebacker Terrell Suggs in season 2 episode 3 "The White Knuckler".
- Then-Jacksonville Jaguars running back Maurice Jones-Drew, then-Atlanta Falcons cornerback Brent Grimes and then-Minnesota Vikings wide receiver Sidney Rice in season 3 episode 1 "The Lockout".
- ESPN fantasy football analyst Matthew Berry in season 3 episode 3 "The Au Pair".
- Chicago Bears running back Matt Forte in season 3 episode 13 "The Funeral".
- Robert Griffin III, Trent Richardson, Matt Kalil, Ryan Kalil, Felix Jones, Brandon Carr, Jason Witten, Jay Ratliff, DeSean Jackson, Rich Eisen, Chris Brockman, and Jerry Jones in season 4 episode 1 "Training Camp"
- Then-wife of then-Chicago Bears quarterback Jay Cutler, Kristin Cavallari in season 4 episode 4, "The Breastalyzer".
- Then-Buffalo Bills quarterback Ryan Fitzpatrick in season 4 episode 5 "Judge MacArthur".
- Former Chicago Bears quarterback Jim McMahon in season 4 episode 6 "The Tailgate".
- NFL Network analyst and Pro Football Hall of Famer Deion Sanders in season 4 episode 11 "12.12.12".
- Minnesota Vikings running back Adrian Peterson in season 4 episode 13 "The Curse of Shiva".
- Houston Texans defensive end J. J. Watt in season 5 episodes 1 and 2 "The Bachelor Draft" and "The Von Nowzick Wedding" and season 6 episode 1 "Sitting Shiva".
- Minnesota Vikings kicker Blair Walsh in season 5 episode 1 "The Bachelor Draft".
- Tampa Bay Buccaneers defensive tackle Gerald McCoy and San Francisco 49ers linebacker NaVorro Bowman in season 5 episode 2 "The Von Nowzick Wedding".
- Chicago Bears quarterback Jay Cutler along with his wife, Kristin Cavallari, in season 5 episode 3 "Chalupa vs. the Cutlet".
- Minnesota Vikings wide receiver Greg Jennings in season 5 episode 10 "The Near Death Flex-perience".
- Then-San Francisco 49ers tight end Vernon Davis in season 5 episode 12 "Baby Geoffrey Jesus".
- NFL Network broadcaster Rich Eisen, Carlos Hyde, Mike Evans, Taylor Lewan, Ryan Shazier, Stephon Tuitt, New Orleans Saints defensive end Cameron Jordan, and then-Cleveland Browns tight end Jordan Cameron in season 6 episode 1 "Sitting Shiva".
- FoxSports.com senior writer Jay Glazer in season 6 episode 2 "Tefl-Andre".
- Philadelphia Eagles running back Darren Sproles in season 6 episode 3 "The Height Supremacist".
- Seattle Seahawks running back Marshawn Lynch in season 6 episode 11 "EBDBBnB" and season 7 episode 1 "That Other Draft".
- Jim McMahon, Calais Campbell, Tyrann Mathieu, and John Schneider in season 7 episode 1 "That Other Draft".
- Green Bay Packers wide receiver Randall Cobb in season 7 episode 4 "Deflategate".
- Detroit Lions wide receiver Golden Tate in season 7 episode 8 "The Last Temptation of Andre".

== The League's fictional league ==
=== Teams ===
- **Andre** – "The Double Ent-Andres" (formerly "The Ooh, Ruxin Got Serveds", "The I Had Allergies", "The Twilight Breaking Dawn-dres" and "The James B-Andres")
- **Kevin** – "Too Hot to Handle" (formerly "The Ruxin Looks Like a Middle-Aged Lesbians", "The Fighting MacArthurs", and "The Pleasures of Andre's Sister")
- **Pete** – "The Shit Heads" (formerly "3-Pete")
- **Ruxin** – "Jenny Top/Kevin Bottom" (formerly "Pete Top/Kevin Bottom", "The Kevin's Micro Dongs", "The MacArthur's Crotch Nubbs", "The Andre Cried While Watching "Jumanjis"", and "The Fear Boners")
- **Taco** – "Password is Taco" (formerly "The Encino Men")
- Vince (drops out in 2010)
- Rafi (replaces Vince in 2010)
- **Jenny** – "The Lady MacArthurs" (replaces Rafi midway through 2010)
- Chuck – "Stephen Hawking's Cleats"—Out-of-town player (drops out in 2015)
- Ted – "The Balls Deeper"—Out-of-town player (dies in 2014)
- **Russell** - "Seabiscuit Rip" -- (replaces Ted in 2014)
- **The Coin** - (replaces Chuck in 2015)

BOLD means current league member.

=== Season-by-season results ===
Show season	NFL season	League season	Shiva Bowl winner	Shiva Bowl loser	Sacko Bowl loser ‡	Draft location
(back story)	2005	1	Pete	Ruxin	N/A	Andre’s Bachelor Pad
(back story)	2006	2	Taco	Pete	N/A	Las Vegas
(back story)	2007	3	Pete	Andre	N/A	Ruxin's House
(back story)	2008	4	Pete	Ruxin	N/A	Pete and Meegan's House
1	2009	5	Andre**	Pete	N/A	Andre's new downtown Chicago loft
2	2010	6	Ruxin	Jenny	Andre†	Las Vegas
3	2011	7 *	Kevin*	Taco	Ruxin (Andre running Ruxin's team)‡	Andre's Metrosexual Loft
4	2012	8	Ted	Pete	Ruxin	Jenny's hospital room
5	2013	9	Jenny	Andre	Kevin	Andre's Bachelor Party in L.A.
6	2014	10	Andre§	Ruxin	Taco	Ted's funeral
7	2015	11	The Coin	Ruxin	Pete	Restaurant (1890s Themed Draft)

– ‡ The Sacko Bowl was not introduced until the sixth season of league play or season two of the actual TV show. Whoever loses the Sacko Bowl wins the Sacko trophy, meaning they placed last.

– ** Andre won the Shiva Bowl in 2009 with the help of Ruxin, whose name is with Andre's on the trophy.

- † Taco "won" the Sacko the first season, but it was overruled after the points had been counted, meaning that Andre was the first to win the Sacko, which started the trend "First to Worst."

- * Because Ruxin discovered that the League colluded to keep him from getting the top draft pick and because he won the Sacko, Kevin was stripped of his championship and the 2011 season of The League was declared null and void, to be sent off by a Norse funeral. However, before the 2012 season, Kevin got his championship reinstated by trading his role as commissioner to Ruxin along with naming rights to his and Jenny's son. Ruxin did not receive Sacko punishment because his stroke, induced by discovery of the collusion, was seen as punishment enough. Ruxin later traded the naming rights to Taco in exchange for Taco's first-round draft pick. Jenny gave birth and Taco announces the name "Chalupa Batman MacArthur," which was quickly changed to "Christopher Benjamin." Later in season 5, it was referenced that Kevin earned back his commissioner role.

- § Ruxin failed to press the "Set Lineup" button before the first game of the week started, so Andre won by default.

- Note: Playoff format does not reseed.

=== The Shiva ===
The Shiva is the name of the trophy given annually to the winner of the fantasy football league. The award is named after Shivakamini Somakandarkram, their high school valedictorian to whom Kevin lost his virginity in Pete's mother's car while listening to Aerosmith.

=== The Sacko ===
The Sacko is the name of the trophy given to the loser of the Sacko Bowl as a booby prize. The 'winner' of the Sacko is also required to do Sacko Punishments.

== Production ==
The League was given a pilot order on July 15, 2009, with the pilot written and directed by Jeff Schaffer, with Jackie Schaffer co-directing. The series is executive produced by Jeff Schaffer, Jackie Schaffer and the production company, FX Productions.

When the series was given a pilot order several roles were cast, with Mark Duplass playing Pete Eckhart, Stephen Rannazzisi playing Kevin MacArthur, Nick Kroll playing Rodney Ruxin, Paul Scheer playing Andre Nowzick, Jon Lajoie playing Taco MacArthur and Katie Aselton playing Jenny MacArthur.

The League was given a series order on August 20, 2009, with six episodes. A 13-episode second season of The League premiered on September 16, 2010, on FX. On January 15, 2011, it was announced that the series had been picked up for a third season, which premiered on October 6, 2011.

On December 13, 2011, the series was renewed for a fourth season of 13 episodes which premiered on October 11, 2012.

On December 20, 2012, the series was renewed for a fifth season of 13 episodes and premiered on September 4, 2013, on the new FXX network.

On March 28, 2013, it was announced that The League was renewed for a sixth season which premiered on September 3, 2014.

On December 8, 2014, it was announced that the seventh season of The League, which premiered on September 9, 2015, would be the final season of the series.

== Home media ==
DVD name	Region 1 release date	Region 2 release date	Region 4 release date	Ep #	Discs	Additional information
Season One	September 14, 2010	TBA	TBA	6	2	Extended Episodes, Deleted Scenes, Blooper Reel, "Andre: Dress with Style, Win with Style", "Legalize Kevin's Pubic Smoke", "Alt Nation", "Mr. McGibblets Fun House and Dojo", "Three Penis Wine Infomercial", "Vaginal Hubris Extended", "Birthday Song" and the pilot of Archer.
Season Two	October 4, 2011	TBA	TBA	13	2	Extended Episodes, Deleted Scenes, Gag Reel, "Taco Tones Productions Presents: Vinegar Strokes", "Taco Tones Productions Presents: I'm Inside Me, Notarize!", "El Notario", "Andre's Extended Fads" and "Ruxin's Wedding Video".
Season Three	October 9, 2012	TBA	TBA	13	2	Extended Episodes, Deleted Scenes, a Gag Reel, "Alt Nation" and "Taco Tones"
Season Four	September 3, 2013	TBA	TBA	13	2	Extended Episodes, Deleted Scenes, "Taco Tones", "Rafi's Helpful Holiday Hints", "Witchy Woman Podcast", "Alt Nation", and a Gag Reel
Season Five	September 2, 2014	TBA	TBA	13	2	Extended Episodes, Gag Reel, Alt Nation, Taco Tones, The Von Nowzick Wedding Invite, Deleted Scenes
Season Six	September 1, 2015	TBA	TBA	13	2	Extended Episodes, Gag Reel, Alt Nation, Taco Tones, Deleted Scenes
Season Seven	June 14, 2016	TBA	TBA	13	2	Extended Episodes, Gag Reel, Alt Nation, Taco Tones, Deleted Scenes

- Seasons 1, 2, 3, and 4 were also released on Blu-ray Disc in Region 1. The show was added to Hulu in 2018.
