= Jeff Schaffer =

American producer, writer, and director

- Born: 1969 or 1970 (age 56–57); Cleveland, Ohio, U.S.
- Education: Harvard University
- Occupations: Screenwriter; producer; director
- Years active: 1994–present
- Spouse: Jackie Schaffer
- Children: 1

Jeff Schaffer (born 1969 or 1970) is an American film and television director, writer, and producer who worked on Seinfeld and Curb Your Enthusiasm.

== Early life and education ==
Schaffer was born in Cleveland, Ohio, and was raised in Warren, Ohio. He is Jewish.

After graduating from Western Reserve Academy in Hudson, Ohio, Schaffer attended Harvard College, where he was on the staff of the humor publication The Harvard Lampoon.

== Career ==
=== Television ===
After college, Schaffer and his Harvard Lampoon writing pals Alec Berg and David Mandel wrote several episodes of the sitcom Seinfeld. He also served as executive producer during its ninth season. He also held various other positions on the show such as program consultant, supervising producer and story editor. Schaffer is credited with creating the Festivus pole.

Schaffer directed several episodes of Curb Your Enthusiasm and also served as executive producer for several episodes. Notably, Schaffer directed "Seinfeld", the finale episode of Curb Your Enthusiasm's seventh season, which featured a reunion of the original cast of the Seinfeld series (for which the star and creator of Curb Your Enthusiasm, Larry David, was co-creator, head writer and executive producer).

The League is a "semi-improvised series" which was created by Schaffer and his wife Jackie Schaffer.

Schaffer worked with Dave Burd to create Dave, a sitcom that is loosely based on Burd's life as a rapper. The show premiered on FXX on March 4, 2020. The show's second season premiered on June 16, 2021.

=== Film ===
Schaffer wrote and directed EuroTrip, a 2004 teen comedy, and participated in the screenplay for the 2003 adaptation of the Dr. Seuss book The Cat in the Hat. Other scripts he helped write include two comedy features starring Sacha Baron Cohen, Brüno (2009) and The Dictator (2012). On the latter film, Alec Berg and David Mandel — former Seinfeld writers as well as friends and collaborators with Schaffer since college — also collaborated, and veteran Seinfeld writer and Curb Your Enthusiasm director Larry Charles directed. All four would later write the TV movie Clear History starring Larry David.

== Festivus pole ==
Dan O'Keefe, who worked with Schaffer on Seinfeld, credits Schaffer with introducing the concept of the Festivus pole as the only decoration for Festivus, the December 23 holiday. Festivus was popularized in the 1997 Seinfeld episode "The Strike". The aluminum pole was not part of the original O'Keefe family celebration, which centered on putting a clock in a bag and nailing it to a wall.

== Personal life ==
Schaffer married the former Jackie Marcus, also his professional partner, particularly on The League; their life experiences have often been translated into the plot of the series. They have a daughter, Arwen (named for the character in The Lord of the Rings), born in 2012.
