= Environmental Science (Community) =

- Community episode
- Episode no.: Season 1 Episode 10
- Directed by: Seth Gordon
- Written by: Zach Paez
- Production code: 108
- Original air date: November 19, 2009

Guest appearances
- Jim Rash as Dean Craig Pelton; Dino Stamatopoulos as Star-Burns; Erik Charles Nielsen as Garrett

Episode chronology
| ← Previous "Debate 109" | Next → "The Politics of Human Sexuality" |
- Community season 1

"Environmental Science" is the tenth episode of the first season of the American comedy television series Community. It aired in the United States on NBC on November 19, 2009.

== Plot ==
Dean Pelton (Jim Rash) announces that Greendale will have its annual environmentalism initiative "Green Week," culminating with a performance by Green Day.

After a small infraction by Annie (Alison Brie), Spanish teacher Ben Chang (Ken Jeong) requires that the students write twenty-page essays due the following Monday. The study group finds the assignment untimely: Shirley (Yvette Nicole Brown) has a marketing presentation due, and Abed (Danny Pudi) and Troy (Donald Glover) are conducting a biology lab experiment. The group asks Jeff (Joel McHale) to intervene with Chang to cancel the assignment.

Pierce (Chevy Chase) offers to help Shirley overcome her public speaking anxiety. She feels that his advice is strange and useless, such as using hand gestures and sexual innuendo to catch attention.

Abed and Troy are trying to train a rat named Fievel to respond to their duet of "Somewhere Out There", but during a test, the rat escapes. Troy, who is afraid of rats, is unable to help catch it, which enters the air ventilation system.

Jeff learns that Chang is bitter over his wife (Andrea de Oliveira) throwing him out. Jeff takes pity on Chang and tries to help him move on, spending the night out drinking with him in exchange for not having to do the essay, unbeknownst to his study group. The next day, the rest of the study group is infuriated to learn that Jeff claims to have already completed the assignment while Chang increases the importance of the essay on their course grade. The group catches Jeff talking to Chang about getting a good grade in exchange for spending more time with him, and insist he fix the problem. Instead, he spends the next night with Chang, ridiculing the homework of other students. Chang breaks down into tears, missing his ex-wife; Jeff realizes he still loves her.

The promised concert arrives, but Dean Pelton finds that the band is actually "Greene Daeye," an Irish folk music ensemble. As the band plays, Chang spots his wife in the crowd. Troy joins Abed as they sing "Somewhere Out There" to recover Fievel; Chang and his wife steal the spotlight dancing at the concert, and Shirley realizes the value of Pierce's advice and gives a successful presentation. After dancing, Chang announces that the essay assignment is cancelled.

== Reception ==
"Environmental Science" was met with positive reviews from critics. It first aired on NBC on November 19, 2009 to an audience of 4.86 million Americans.

Emily VanDerWerff of The A.V. Club rated the episode A−, praising the show's continued development but worrying that some viewers might find Chang's character too broad and irritating.

Jonah Krakow of IGN rated the episode a 7.6/10 described as narratively satisfying.
