= Introduction to Film =

- Community episode
- Episode no.: Season 1 Episode 3
- Directed by: Anthony Russo
- Written by: Tim Hobert; Jon Pollack
- Production code: 102
- Original air date: October 1, 2009

Guest appearances
- John Michael Higgins as Professor Whitman; Iqbal Theba as Gobi Nadir; Matt Jones as Coffee Guy

Episode chronology
← Previous "Spanish 101"	Next → "Social Psychology"
- Community season 1

"Introduction to Film" is the third episode of the first season of the American comedy television series Community. It aired in the United States on NBC on October 1, 2009. The episode sees Jeff attempt to "seize the day" to pass a class, while Britta pays for Abed to take a filmmaking class, to his dad's annoyance. It received generally positive critical reviews and garnered 5.86 million viewers upon its premiere.

== Plot ==
Jeff (Joel McHale) convinces the rest of the study group to enroll in an easy class, taught by the eccentric Professor Whitman (John Michael Higgins). Whitman claims that they will all get 'A' grades as long as they follow the mantra carpe diem. He then confronts Jeff after the class, saying that he is an opportunist and will fail the class unless he seizes the day by the end of the week. Jeff's initial attempts to impress Whitman by wearing rainbow-colored suspenders, flying a kite, and playing jump rope fail.

Meanwhile, Abed (Danny Pudi) is unable to join a film class as his father Gobi (Iqbal Theba) will only pay for classes that teach skills that can help him with the family's failing falafel stand. Britta (Gillian Jacobs) gives Abed money to enroll in filmmaking classes, his true passion. Abed purchases a new camera and starts to document conversations within the study group, casting Britta as his mother and Jeff as his father to their dismay. Gobi accosts Britta for interfering with his parenting. Britta and Jeff explain their problems to each other, and Jeff promises that he will convince Gobi to meet with them to discuss Abed's future.

As Abed works, Gobi, Jeff, and Britta get into an argument, but Abed interrupts them with his completed video, which uses his footage of Jeff and Britta arguing and superimposes the images of his parents' heads onto their bodies. The film is cut to recast the study group's conversations as Abed's parents' opinions of him, as an abnormal child who had a turbulent childhood filled with medical tests and a divorce. The film implies that his parents divorced because of his atypical behavior. Gobi is moved by the film and allows Abed to continue his filmmaking studies to help him be better understood. Thankful for Jeff's help, Britta kisses him when she sees Whitman nearby. An enthused Whitman is satisfied that Jeff has seized the day.

In the end tag, Abed starts to krump in front of Troy, who then begins to demonstrate his method of krumping. Jeff arrives and asks what they are doing, before demonstrating his own technique, and the three krump together.

== Analysis ==
John Michael Higgins as Professor Whitman references the 1989 American teen drama film Dead Poets Society.

== Reception ==
Upon its first broadcast in the United States, an estimated 5.86 million viewers watched the episode.

Jonah Krakow of IGN rated the episode eight out of ten, praising Jeff's storyline as amusing and Abed's documentary as "surprisingly poignant". Krakow reviewed that Chevy Chase's visual gags served to make "great use of his limited screentime". Emily VanDerWerff of The A.V. Club gave the episode a B rating, criticising its messages as "heavy-handed". However, she praised Troy and Pierce's interactions, and wrote that Abed's storyline served to "deepen a character who could have turned out to be just a stereotype". VanDerWerff approved of the "queasily hilarious" video that Abed produces, which made "a surprisingly moving end" to the episode. Eric Hochberger of TV Fanatic found that the episode demonstrated that the series can "tug at your emotional strings" as well as provide comedy. Entertainment Weekly's John Young gave the episode a middling review, believing that Higgins' performance was funny but calling Abed "so awkwardly antisocial that he's no longer amusing".
