= The Science of Illusion =

- Community episode
- Episode no.: Season 1 Episode 20
- Directed by: Adam Davidson
- Written by: Zach Paez
- Production code: 122
- Original air date: March 25, 2010

Guest appearances
- Jim Rash as Dean Craig Pelton; Eve Brent as Glenda; Jay Johnston as Police Officer #2; Craig Cackowski as Officer Cackowski; Dino Stamatopoulos as Star-Burns; Richard Erdman as Leonard

Episode chronology
← Previous "Beginner Pottery"	Next → "Contemporary American Poultry"
- Community season 1

"The Science of Illusion" is the twentieth episode of the first season of the American comedy television series Community. It aired in the United States on NBC on March 25, 2010.

== Plot ==
Due to potential April Fools' Day shenanigans, Annie (Alison Brie) and Shirley (Yvette Nicole Brown) become on-campus security guards. Both fight to be the "bad cop," while Abed (Danny Pudi) follows their activities. Pierce announces he is about to become a "level 6 Laser Lotus" in his "Buddhist church," (Note: As first mentioned in "Comparative Religion.") which inspires Jeff (Joel McHale) to trick him into looking like the Cookie Crisp wizard. Britta (Gillian Jacobs) chides the group for the prank, but they just call her a buzzkill. In response, she plans her own prank to sneak a frog with a sombrero onto Señor Chang's (Ken Jeong) desk, but it backfires when she sneaks into the biology room and knocks a cadaver out of the window.

When Dean Pelton (Jim Rash) confronts the Spanish class about the incident, Jeff figures out what happened and gives Britta an ultimatum to confess. Britta calls Annie and Shirley anonymously to accuse Jeff, leading the two to chase him unsuccessfully. Abed, pretending to be a police chief, reprimands Annie and Shirley and tells them to step down, but the two decide to pursue the case unofficially. They track down Jeff in the study room and attempt to force him to confess before Britta admits what she did, saying she just wanted people to see her differently. Annie, Shirley, Pierce, and Troy (Donald Glover) make similar confessions, and Jeff reassures Britta that she is an important member of the group.

The end tag shows the first appearance of the Troy and Abed in the Morning! show.

== Reception ==
Around 5.07 million Americans watched "The Science of Illusion".

Emily VanDerWerff of The A.V. Club gave the episode an A− and praised "the show's willingness to tell weird stories that nonetheless find heartwarming things to say."
