= Community season 1 =

Season of television series

Community
- Season 1
- DVD cover
- Showrunner: Dan Harmon
- Starring: Joel McHale; Gillian Jacobs; Danny Pudi; Yvette Nicole Brown; Alison Brie; Donald Glover; Ken Jeong; Chevy Chase
- No. of episodes: 25

Release
- Original network: NBC
- Original release: September 17, 2009 – May 20, 2010

Season chronology
- Next → Season 2

The first season of the television sitcom Community originally aired from September 17, 2009, on NBC to May 20, 2010, in the United States. The first three episodes aired at 9:30 pm ET before being moved to 8:00 pm ET. The show was picked up for 22 episodes in October 2009, and an additional 3 episodes were ordered later.

The show focuses on disbarred lawyer Jeff Winger, and his attempt to get a bachelor's degree at a community college, while he forms a bond with his Spanish study group.

== Cast ==
=== Starring ===
- Joel McHale as Jeff Winger
- Gillian Jacobs as Britta Perry
- Danny Pudi as Abed Nadir
- Yvette Nicole Brown as Shirley Bennett
- Alison Brie as Annie Edison
- Donald Glover as Troy Barnes
- Ken Jeong as Señor Ben Chang
- Chevy Chase as Pierce Hawthorne

=== Recurring ===
- Jim Rash as Dean Craig Pelton
- John Oliver as Dr. Ian Duncan
- Dino Stamatopoulos as Alex "Star-Burns" Osbourne
- Richard Erdman as Leonard Briggs
- Erik Charles Nielsen as Garrett Lambert
- Lauren Stamile as Professor Michelle Slater
- Eric Christian Olsen as Vaughn Miller
- John Michael Higgins as Professor Eustice Whitman
- Iqbal Theba as Gubi Nadir
- Craig Cackowski as Officer Cackowski
- Bill Parks as Eric Wisniewski
- Dominik Musiol as Pavel Iwaszkiewicz
- DC Pierson as Mark Millot
- Meggie McFadden as Linda Greene

=== Guest stars ===
- Jack Black as Buddy Austin ("Investigative Journalism")
- Blake Clark as Coach Herbert Bogner ("Physical Education")
- Tony Hale as Professor Marion Holly ("Beginner Pottery")
- Anthony Michael Hall as Mike Chilada ("Comparative Religion")
- Sharon Lawrence as Doreen ("The Politics of Human Sexuality")
- Greg Cromer as Rich Stephenson ("Beginner Pottery")
- Lee Majors as Admiral Lee Slaughter ("Beginner Pottery")
- Katharine McPhee as Amber ("Basic Genealogy")
- Jerry Minor as Jerry the Janitor ("English as a Second Language")
- Patton Oswalt as Nurse Jackie ("Home Economics")
- Lisa Rinna as Mark's mother ("The Art of Discourse")
- Owen Wilson as Other Study Group's Leader ("Investigative Journalism", uncredited cameo)

== Episodes ==
Season one episodes
| No. overall | No. in season | Title | Directed by | Written by | Original release date | Prod. code | U.S. viewers (millions) |
|---|---|---|---|---|---|---|---|
| 1 | 1 | "Pilot" | Anthony Russo & Joe Russo | Dan Harmon | September 17, 2009 | 100 | 7.89 |
Recently disbarred lawyer Jeffrey Winger is forced to attend Greendale Community College to redeem his illegitimate law degree, planning on exploiting his friendship with former client Dr. Ian Duncan (John Oliver) for test answers. He starts up a Spanish study group in order to score with attractive classmate Britta Perry, who invites her friend Abed Nadir, who in turn invites classmates Troy Barnes, Annie Edison, Shirley Bennett, and Pierce Hawthorne.
| 2 | 2 | "Spanish 101" | Joe Russo | Dan Harmon | September 24, 2009 | 101 | 5.39 |
The Spanish students are paired to create simple dialogues; Jeff is stuck with Pierce after an attempt to be paired with Britta backfires. Shirley and Annie mount a student protest after Britta tells them of anti-journalist violence in Guatemala.
| 3 | 3 | "Introduction to Film" | Anthony Russo | Tim Hobert & Jon Pollack | October 1, 2009 | 102 | 5.86 |
Britta helps Abed by paying for a course where he can study film, angering and causing her to come into conflict with his father. Meanwhile, Jeff signs up for an "easy A" class taught by Professor Whitman (John Michael Higgins), where all they have to do is "seize the day" to receive an A, which proves tougher than he expected.
| 4 | 4 | "Social Psychology" | Anthony Russo | Liz Cackowski | October 8, 2009 | 104 | 4.87 |
Jeff begins to bond with Shirley over their mutual distaste for Vaughn (Eric Christian Olsen), Britta's new boyfriend, a laid back hippie. Meanwhile, Annie joins Duncan in a psychology experiment that tests people's patience, which has Abed, Troy, and Señor Chang (Ken Jeong) as test subjects.
| 5 | 5 | "Advanced Criminal Law" | Joe Russo | Andrew Guest | October 15, 2009 | 105 | 5.01 |
Señor Chang discovers someone has cheated on their Spanish test, and will fail everyone unless the cheater reveals themselves within 24 hours. When Britta comes forward, Jeff represents her as she faces expulsion for cheating. Meanwhile, Annie enlists Pierce to help write a new song for Greendale, Troy messes with Abed's gullibility, and Abed tries to pay him back.
| 6 | 6 | "Football, Feminism and You" | Joe Russo | Hilary Winston | October 22, 2009 | 103 | 5.04 |
The Dean blackmails Jeff into convincing Troy to join Greendale's football team, over the objections of Annie. Shirley teaches Britta proper ladies room etiquette, and Pierce and the Dean devise a new school mascot, the Human Being.
| 7 | 7 | "Introduction to Statistics" | Justin Lin | Tim Hobert & Jon Pollack | October 29, 2009 | 106 | 5.32 |
Annie hosts a Day of the Dead party for Halloween. Jeff hits on his statistics professor, which upsets Shirley but not Britta, while at the party, Pierce has a bad trip.
| 8 | 8 | "Home Economics" | Anthony Russo | Lauren Pomerantz | November 5, 2009 | 107 | 5.45 |
Jeff is kicked out of his condo and moves in with Abed temporarily, causing him to turn into more of a slob. Annie helps Troy prepare for his date with a different girl, and Pierce joins Vaughn's band, against the wishes of Britta.
| 9 | 9 | "Debate 109" | Joe Russo | Tim Hobert | November 12, 2009 | 109 | 5.09 |
The Dean solicits Jeff to join Annie in a debate competition, where they will compete against star debater Jeremy Simmons to debate whether Man is intrinsically evil or good. Meanwhile, Abed's latest student films show a prescient tendency that frightens Shirley, and Pierce offers his services as a hypnotherapist to Britta in her attempts to stop smoking.
| 10 | 10 | "Environmental Science" | Seth Gordon | Zach Paez | November 19, 2009 | 108 | 4.86 |
When Señor Chang becomes more erratic and assigns twenty pages of homework to the class due to the sadness of separating from his wife, the study group convinces Jeff to try and befriend him. Meanwhile, Pierce helps Shirley with her public speaking class, and Abed and Troy work on a biology experiment where they lose their lab rat.
| 11 | 11 | "The Politics of Human Sexuality" | Anthony Russo | Hilary Winston | December 3, 2009 | 110 | 5.42 |
Annie and the Dean sponsor an STD-awareness fair, where Britta and Shirley help Annie prepare for her big condom usage demonstration. Troy and Abed compete to see who is the better athlete, and Jeff and Pierce go on a double date to the fair where Jeff learns that he is starting to lose interest in shallow women.
| 12 | 12 | "Comparative Religion" | Adam Davidson | Liz Cackowski | December 10, 2009 | 111 | 5.51 |
Shirley plans a Christmas party for the study group, hoping to celebrate in her Christian ways, but learns everyone else is from a different religious background – Annie is Jewish, Abed is Muslim, Troy is a Jehovah's Witness, Britta is an atheist, Pierce is in an odd cult but believes that it is a Buddhist community, while Jeff is agnostic. Meanwhile, Jeff stands up to a bully named Mike (Anthony Michael Hall) that harasses Abed in the cafeteria, leading to a fight Shirley disapproves of.
| 13 | 13 | "Investigative Journalism" | Joe Russo | Jon Pollack & Tim Hobert | January 14, 2010 | 113 | 5.42 |
The group returns from their winter break, and realize a student named Buddy (Jack Black) has inserted himself into the study group and must decide whether or not to allow him to stay. Meanwhile, Dean Pelton makes Jeff the new editor of the Greendale Gazette Journal, where Annie discovers a story about racial profiling in the school.
| 14 | 14 | "Interpretive Dance" | Justin Lin | Lauren Pomerantz | January 21, 2010 | 112 | 4.75 |
Britta and Troy try to keep a secret from the group that they are taking dance lessons. Meanwhile, Jeff tries to keep his relationship with Professor Slater (Lauren Stamile) a secret as well. Chaos ensues when the group learns about the secrets.
| 15 | 15 | "Romantic Expressionism" | Joe Russo | Andrew Guest | February 4, 2010 | 115 | 5.23 |
Britta and Jeff conspire to break up Vaughn and Annie by attempting to reignite the latter's feelings for Troy. Meanwhile, Pierce tries to get some genuine laughs during Troy and Abed's bad film night.
| 16 | 16 | "Communication Studies" | Adam Davidson | Chris McKenna | February 11, 2010 | 116 | 5.15 |
On Valentines Day, Britta gets drunk and leaves an embarrassing message for Jeff which "disrupts the balance" in their relationship, leading Abed to tell Jeff to leave her an equally embarrassing message so she can get back her power. Meanwhile, Annie and Shirley try to pull a prank on Señor Chang after he embarrasses Troy and Pierce during class.
| 17 | 17 | "Physical Education" | Anthony Russo | Jessie Miller | March 4, 2010 | 118 | 5.02 |
Jeff eagerly anticipates his billiards class, but his hopes fall down when he discovers that the instructor (Blake Clark) demands the use of gym shorts, which turns into a battle between the instructor and Jeff. The girls find a passionate sketch in a Spanish textbook resembling Abed's face, and they happily begin to search for the author of the book, while testing Abed's skills regarding relationships with women.
| 18 | 18 | "Basic Genealogy" | Ken Whittingham | Karey Dornetto | March 11, 2010 | 117 | 4.60 |
During Family Day at Greendale, Pierce tries to re-connect with his step-daughter Amber (Katharine McPhee), who becomes attracted to Jeff. Britta gets caned by Troy's nana, and Shirley's sons cause havoc for Abed's father.
| 19 | 19 | "Beginner Pottery" | Anthony Russo | Hilary Winston | March 18, 2010 | 114 | 5.07 |
Jeff signs up for an easy pottery credit taught by a man (Tony Hale) with only one rule: no re-enactments of the pottery love scene from Ghost; however, the class becomes complicated by Jeff's obsession with proving one talented classmate is a ringer. Shirley and others sign up for a boating class taught by Admiral Slaughter (Lee Majors) in the school parking lot, but find land-boating harder than it sounds.
| 20 | 20 | "The Science of Illusion" | Adam Davidson | Zach Paez | March 25, 2010 | 122 | 5.07 |
Britta pulls an April Fools prank that backfires on her. Annie and Shirley become on-campus security guards with both fighting to be the "bad cop".
| 21 | 21 | "Contemporary American Poultry" | Tristram Shapeero | Emily Cutler & Karey Dornetto | April 22, 2010 | 123 | 3.67 |
Jeff's plan to get chicken fingers from the school cafeteria for the study group quickly evolves into a mafia film-style endeavor with Abed calling all the shots.
| 22 | 22 | "The Art of Discourse" | Adam Davidson | Chris McKenna | April 29, 2010 | 124 | 4.36 |
After Pierce's jokes go too far, Shirley gets him kicked out the study group. Meanwhile, Jeff and Britta plot revenge on a group of high schoolers who make fun of them for attending community college, and Troy helps Abed accomplish some of his film-clichéd social goals.
| 23 | 23 | "Modern Warfare" | Justin Lin | Emily Cutler | May 6, 2010 | 119 | 4.35 |
After the Dean announces the prize for a friendly game of paintball, Greendale sinks into a state of all-out paintball war, with every student battling for supremacy. During the chaos, the study group teams up in order to last longer in the game.
| 24 | 24 | "English as a Second Language" | Gail Mancuso | Tim Hobert | May 13, 2010 | 120 | 4.49 |
Señor Chang reveals to Jeff that he does not have a teaching degree. When Dean Pelton finds out, Chang is replaced by another, much stricter professor who has the class take a much harder Spanish final, worrying the study group they will have to repeat Spanish. Meanwhile, Troy discovers he has a natural talent for fixing plumbing, and must ward off a persistent maintenance worker (Jerry Minor), who wants him to use his talent to become a plumber.
| 25 | 25 | "Pascal's Triangle Revisited" | Joe Russo | Hilary Winston | May 20, 2010 | 121 | 4.43 |
After Britta is nominated for queen of the Transfer Dance, Professor Slater admits to Jeff that she misses him and wants to get back together, leading to conflict as the two end up competing for him. Meanwhile, as Troy prepares to move out, he is hoping to move in with Abed, but is disappointed after he rejects the idea.

== Production ==
=== Casting ===
Dan Harmon emphasized the importance of the cast to making the premise of the comedy work. "Casting was 95 percent of putting the show together," he said in an interview. He had worked with several of the cast members earlier; Joel McHale, John Oliver, and Chevy Chase all had cameo roles in episode 9 of Water and Power, the short film series produced by Harmon for Channel 101. Actor Chevy Chase had long been a favorite of Harmon. Though principally not very partial to sitcoms, Chase was persuaded to take the job by the quality of the show's writing. Harmon saw similarities between Chase and the character he plays on the show. Though Chase has often been ridiculed for his career choices, Harmon believed this role could be redeeming: "What makes Chevy and Pierce heroic is this refusal to stop." Harmon had to warn Chase against playing a "wise-ass" the way he often does in his roles, since the character of Pierce is a rather pathetic figure who is normally the butt of the joke himself.

McHale, known from the E! comedy talk show The Soup, was also (like Chase) impressed by Harmon's writing. He commented that "Dan's script... was so head and shoulders above everything else that I was reading." McHale appealed to Harmon because of his likeable quality, which allowed the character to possess certain unsympathetic traits without turning the viewer against him. For the role of Annie, Harmon wanted someone who would resemble Tracy Flick, Reese Witherspoon's character from the 1999 film Election. Originally the producers were looking for a Latina or Asian Tracy Flick. Instead they ended up casting Alison Brie, known from her role as Trudy Campbell on Mad Men.

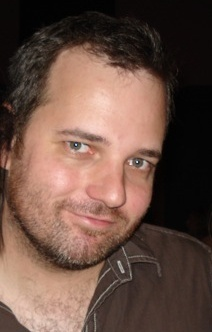
Dan Harmon

=== Development ===
The premise of Community was based on Harmon's real-life experiences. In an attempt to save his relationship with his then-girlfriend, he enrolled in Glendale Community College northeast of Los Angeles, where they would take Spanish together. Harmon got involved in a study group and, somewhat against his own instincts, became closely connected to the group of people with whom he had very little in common. "...I was in this group with these knuckleheads and I started really liking them," he explains, "even though they had nothing to do with the film industry and I had nothing to gain from them and nothing to offer them." With this as the background, Harmon wrote the show with a main character largely based on himself. He had, like Jeff, been self-centered and independent to the extreme before he realized the value of connecting with other people.

About the creative process behind the writing, Harmon says that he had to write the show as if it were a film, not a sitcom. Essentially, he says, the process was no different from the earlier work he had done, except for the length and the target demographic.

== Reception ==
=== Critical reception ===
The show's reviews for season 1 have been mostly positive, scoring a 69 out of 100 with critics on Metacritic. On Rotten Tomatoes, the season has an approval rating of 90% with an average score of 7.5 out of 10 based on 42 reviews. The website's critical consensus reads, "Snarky and fast-paced with a surprisingly tender undercurrent and an engaging cast, Community is one of the best new comedies of the season."

Notably, David Bushman (Curator, Television) of the Paley Center for Media called Community the best new show of the fall season. Jonah Krakow of IGN gave the first season an 8.5 saying "Given the way Community eventually ramped up and delivered some amazing stories in the second half of the season, I'm extremely excited about what's to come for Season 2."

=== Awards and nominations ===
- The show received a nomination for "Favorite New TV Comedy" at the 36th People's Choice Awards.
- Justin Lin received a nomination for "Outstanding Directing in a Comedy Series" at the 41st NAACP Image Awards for "Introduction to Statistics".

=== Nielsen ratings ===
The first season averaged 5 million viewers with a 2.4 rating in the 18–49 demographic and ranked #97 for the season.

== DVD release ==
The first season of Community was released on DVD on September 21, 2010. The DVD contains all 25 episodes on four discs plus special features. Special features on the DVD include:

- Commentary on every episode. Participants include creator Dan Harmon; cast members Joel McHale, Gillian Jacobs, Danny Pudi, Yvette Nicole Brown, Alison Brie, Donald Glover, Ken Jeong and Chevy Chase; directors Anthony Russo, Joe Russo and Adam Davidson; and writers Andrew Guest, Lauren Pomerantz, Hilary Winston, Karey Dornetto, Chris McKenna and Emily Cutler.
- Outtakes
- Season one cast evaluations
- Season one highlight reel
- "Creative Compromises" featurette
- "Advanced Criminal Law" alternative scenes
- Three mini episodes
- "Kickpuncher" comic book
