= Spanish 101 =

- Community episode
- Episode no.: Season 1 Episode 2
- Directed by: Joe Russo
- Written by: Dan Harmon
- Production code: 101
- Original air date: September 24, 2009

Guest appearances
- Jim Rash as Dean Craig Pelton; Dino Stamatopoulos as Star-Burns

Episode chronology
← Previous "Pilot"	Next → "Introduction to Film"
- Community season 1

"Spanish 101" is the second episode of the first season of the American comedy television series Community. It aired in the United States on NBC on September 24, 2009. The episode features Jeff and Pierce working on a Spanish project as Annie and Shirley organize a protest. Receiving 5.39 million viewers upon its premiere, the episode was met with mostly positive critical reception. The end tag—the first of the series—shows Troy and Abed performing a nonsense rap in Spanish, an early interaction between the pair which was praised by reviewers.

== Plot ==
Jeff (Joel McHale) is late to the group's study session. Britta (Gillian Jacobs) is upset by his lacking punctuality and gets the group to agree to question him about it. When Jeff arrives, everyone except Britta is charmed by him as he greets each of them in turn. She fails to get the group to confront Jeff regarding his lack of punctuality, and ends up questioning him herself. Later, Jeff gives Britta a card to apologize for his poor first impression two weeks prior, but Britta remains wary of him, believing him to be exploiting other members of the group. Meanwhile, Shirley (Yvette Nicole Brown) and Annie (Alison Brie) are interested in learning about a social justice cause Britta mentioned prior, the killing of journalists in Guatemala such as Chacata Panecos. Shirley and Annie plan a protest, but Britta is annoyed at the pair, believing them to be going about the matter in poor taste in part due to plans to have a Chacata Panecos piñata after the journalist was beaten to death.

The group's Spanish instructor, Ben Chang (Ken Jeong), randomly divides the students into pairs for an assignment. Jeff trades his shirt with Abed (Danny Pudi) in exchange for switching partners, but Britta has already swapped with Pierce (Chevy Chase), whom Jeff is unhappy to work with. Pierce is excited to work with Jeff, insisting on drinking scotch and socializing before they begin the assignment. As Pierce develops an increasingly complicated Spanish presentation, veering wildly off-topic into various irrelevant, bigoted, and confusing directions, while failing to use the Spanish phrases required to pass the assignment, Jeff grows angry and storms out.

Meanwhile, Annie and Shirley are hosting a candlelight vigil. Initially annoyed, Britta apologizes to them and asks how she can help. Jeff arrives, trying to impress Britta. Pierce soon arrives and yells at Jeff before accidentally lighting himself on fire from a protester's candle and running into a fountain. Shirley and Annie are thrilled when they discover a newspaper article about the event, though it mostly focuses on Pierce's injuries.

On the day of the presentation, Pierce is ready to do his presentation without Jeff (he is angry with him) when Britta reveals that Pierce offered her money to swap partners in order to get closer with Jeff. Jeff changes his mind and performs it with him. The presentation is lengthy, with multiple costume changes and a variety of props (such as sparklers, an Israeli flag, sombreros, and a Palestinian flag) and dance sequences. Unimpressed, Chang fails the pair. An amused Britta tells Jeff that no woman present will ever see him in a sexual context in the future.

== End tag ==
External videos
- "Spanish Rap"; The end tag of "Spanish 101".

"Spanish 101" is the first Community episode to feature an end tag, which shows Troy and Abed performing a Spanish rap with nonsense lyrics. Their rap is referenced in later episodes, in which different characters add to or modify the rap. Creator Dan Harmon had expected Troy and Pierce to form a natural connection as characters, but wrote Troy and Abed together in the first end tag after seeing Pudi and Glover improvise a rap on a red carpet in front of a journalist.

== Reception ==
Upon its first broadcast in the United States, an estimated 5.39 million viewers watched the episode.

The episode received positive critical reception. Bill Wyman of Slate ranked the episode ninth-best of the series' first 59 episodes (up to the mid-season break in season 3). Emily St. James of The A.V. Club rated the episode A−, finding the characters amusing and praising their writing, positively reviewing how the episode develops the show from the pilot. Eric Hochberger of TV Fanatic praised the episode as "fantastic" and highlighted Chang as "hilarious". Jonah Krakow of IGN praised Chang's acting and the presentation delivered by Jeff and Pierce, but criticised the middle parts of the episode. Krakow criticized Annie, Shirley and Pierce as "one-note" and found Pierce's anger at Jeff to be "rushed and unearned".

After the program's conclusion, Kieran McLean of Screen Rant ranked the end tag the third-best of the series. Screen Rant's Mark Birrell and Uproxx's Alyssa Fikse ranked the end tag the fifth and twelfth best moments of Troy and Abed's friendship in the series, respectively. Krakow also praised the end tag.
