= Cooperative Calligraphy =

- Community episode
- Episode no.: Season 2 Episode 8
- Directed by: Joe Russo
- Written by: Megan Ganz
- Production code: 208
- Original air date: November 11, 2010

Guest appearance
- Jim Rash as Dean Craig Pelton

Episode chronology
← Previous "Aerodynamics of Gender"	Next → "Conspiracy Theories and Interior Design"
- Community season 2

"Cooperative Calligraphy" is the eighth episode of the second season of the American comedy television series Community, and the 33rd episode of the series overall. A metafictional bottle episode, it aired in the United States on NBC on November 11, 2010.

== Plot ==
While the study group finishes their diorama for their anthropology class, Dean Pelton (Jim Rash) invites everyone for a puppy parade. Annie (Alison Brie) notices that her purple gel grip pen is missing, but the others dismiss her concerns. Enraged, Annie claims she's tired of lending her stuff and not getting it back, demanding everyone to stay to find the pen. The television-savvy (occasionally metafictional) Abed (Danny Pudi) notes they are on the precipice of entering a bottle episode within the sitcom that encompasses their lives.

Unsuccessful in finding the pen, the group starts to leave until Annie accuses Britta (Gillian Jacobs) of being the one who stole it. This escalates to a full search of everyone's stuff and everyone accusing each other. Annie tries to get Jeff (Joel McHale) to take control of the situation, but when his advice to the group is taken as an admission of guilt, he institutes a lockdown ("I'm doing a bottle episode"), forcing everyone to stay in the room until the pen is found.

As they work through the bags, they discover disconcerting secrets about each member of the study group. Abed's journal is discovered to have been tracking the three women's menstrual cycles so that he knows the best days to talk to them. They discover a pregnancy test in Shirley's (Yvette Nicole Brown) bag; she claims that she rekindled her relationship with her ex-husband over Labor Day weekend, but Abed points out that his charts show that she was last ovulating during Halloween. Troy (Donald Glover), remembering that Shirley had sex with Chang on Halloween, (Note: As seen in "Epidemiology.") realizes that Chang might be the father of her child.

Shirley and Britta get into a heated argument about religion and sex before Jeff snaps and tears apart the room looking for the pen. The group proposes strip-searching each other to prove no one has taken it and divides the room by gender to search themselves, but to no avail. Eventually, they decide Pierce (Chevy Chase) must have stuck it down one of his leg casts. They cut the casts open, but the pen is not there.

The group sits around in regret, but Jeff points out the bonds between them are so strong that it would have been impossible for anyone to have taken the pen and still not have confessed. Such an act was so unlikely, saying that a ghost took the pen would be more reasonable. Satisfied with this, the group leaves the destroyed study room, too late to join the puppy parade.

After the group leaves, Troy's monkey Annie's Boobs appears from a vent in the study room, snatching a spoon and taking it back to its cache of stolen objects, which includes all of Annie's missing pens.

== Reception ==
In its original broadcast, "Cooperative Calligraphy" reached approximately 5.635 million households with a 2.0 rating/6% share in the 18-49 demographic.

The episode received positive reviews from critics, with Michelle St. James of Daemon's TV writing, "From Annie's primal scream to almost every single Troy line ('Do they find thoughts in our butts? I knew I should have read that book.'), 'Cooperative Calligraphy' is packed with hilarity, character development, and puppies."

Cory Barker of TVsurveillance wrote, "'Cooperative Calligraphy' is both the culmination of the last 15 episodes and the catalyst for a number of surely-awesome plots and episodes to come. It's a reminder that Community can be just as hilarious when telling intensely personal and small-scale stories as it is when riffing on pop culture's biggest genres and formats. And that's why it is television's best comedy."
