= Pascal's Triangle Revisited =

- Community episode
- Episode no.: Season 1 Episode 25
- Directed by: Joe Russo
- Written by: Hilary Winston
- Production code: 121
- Original air date: May 20, 2010

Guest appearances
- John Michael Higgins as Professor Whitman; Lauren Stamile as Professor Slater; John Oliver as Dr. Ian Duncan; Jim Rash as Dean Craig Pelton; Eric Christian Olsen as Vaughn; Dino Stamatopoulos as Star-Burns; Richard Erdman as Leonard; Erik Charles Nielsen as Garrett; Meggie McFadden as Linda

Episode chronology
← Previous "English as a Second Language"	Next → "Anthropology 101"
- Community season 1

"Pascal's Triangle Revisited" is the twenty-fifth and final episode of the first season of Community. It originally aired in the United States on NBC on May 20, 2010. In the episode, the group gets ready to say goodbye for the summer at the end-of-year dance. Britta and Professor Slater compete over their affections for Jeff, while Annie considers leaving Greendale and Troy looks for a new place to live. The episode received generally positive reviews, with critics both praising and criticizing the final twist.

== Plot ==
To celebrate the end of the school year, Dean Pelton (Jim Rash) announces the upcoming Transfer Formal (abbreviated to "Tranny Dance"). Jeff (Joel McHale) and Annie (Alison Brie) learn that Britta (Gillian Jacobs) has been nominated for queen of the dance. In her therapy session with Dr. Duncan (John Oliver), (Note: As part of her sentence from "Advanced Criminal Law".) Britta expresses doubts about the prom-like dance. Chang (Ken Jeong), now a student, (Note: Due to his firing in the previous episode.) asks Duncan to help him cheat in his classes; Duncan ridicules him instead. Professor Slater (Lauren Stamile) expresses interest in getting back together with Jeff. At a kegger hosted by Abed (Danny Pudi), Troy (Donald Glover), looking for a place to live, gives Abed strong hints about moving in together, but Abed ignores them. Annie's boyfriend, Vaughn (Eric Christian Olsen), tells her he's been recruited for a hacky sack team in Delaware and will be transferring. Noticing Slater's interest in Jeff, Britta decides to attend the dance.

At the dance, Annie tells the group she's moving to Delaware with Vaughn for the summer, but privately tells Jeff she's transferring for good to live in the moment. Pierce (Chevy Chase) invites Troy to live in his mansion, which Abed encourages because he believes being roommates with Troy would create conflict in their relationship. Shirley (Yvette Nicole Brown) urges Britta to express her feelings for Jeff. Duncan tells Slater that Jeff and Britta had sex, (Note: During the paintball match in "Modern Warfare".) and Slater confronts Britta. Seeing Jeff and Slater together, Britta interrupts the announcement of "Tranny Queen" and blurts out that she loves Jeff; Slater follows suit. Jeff is unable to pick one of them, but Duncan interrupts with a drunken rap. The Dean suspends Duncan over this and Chang, angry about earlier, attacks Duncan now that he's no longer a teacher. Jeff takes advantage of the ensuing chaos and sneaks out. Troy decides to accept Pierce's offer.

Outside, Jeff runs into Annie, who decided not to move after all. They discuss the uncertainty of their identities and relationships, and Jeff realizes he should return to the dance to fix things. He tells Annie he's happy she's back, and they share a hug, then suddenly kiss.

== Production ==
The episode was written by Hilary Winston and is her fourth writing credit for the show. It was directed by Joe Russo in his eighth directing credit for the show.

== Cultural references ==
During one scene, Abed attempts to recreate a scene as an homage to the finale of Cheers. Jeff greets Duncan by calling him Dudley Moore. Troy expresses his enjoyment of the Happy Days episode where they jump the shark. When announcing the nominees for "Tranny Queen", one of the names heard is Danielle Harmon, a female version of creator Dan Harmon's name. Star-Burns expresses support for "Team Coco"; Dino Stamatopoulos, who plays the character, was a writer for Late Night when Conan O'Brien hosted. Pierce calls Abed "Rain Man" when listing off members of the study group.

== Reception ==
=== Ratings ===
In its original airing, "Pascal's Triangle Revisited" was seen by 4.41 million American viewers, placing fourth in its time slot behind Bones, The Mentalist, and FlashForward. It scored a 2.0/7 in the 18-49 demographic, keeping it even with the previous week and placing second in its time slot behind Bones.

=== Reviews ===
The episode received generally positive reviews from critics. Jonah Krakow of IGN gave the episode 8.8 out of 10, denoting a "great" episode. He noted that the episode "had a lot going for it, especially for those of us who have followed along for the entire season. Between the three hefty storylines, (four, if you count Senor Chang's beef with Dr Duncan), there were dozens of references to earlier episodes of Community, which was an amusing nod". He also thought the kiss between Jeff and Annie "was a nice twist on the overused love triangle storyline." Alan Sepinwall of Uproxx remarked that with the previous episode also feeling like a finale, "maybe [Dan Harmon] felt like a show that’s so self-aware about its place as a TV show couldn’t accommodate all of its finale ideas into just one episode." He thought "the self-awareness got in the way of the comedy" and was initially disheartened when the episode seemed to be building around the Jeff-Britta relationship, but he enjoyed the ending and remarked, "there is a lot of comic mileage to be had here, whether that kiss leads to more right away or not." Writing for Paste, Sean Gandert gave the episode an 8.4; he noted that "the episode’s real Big Change is that Jeff and Annie are now together and it’s a match that, while perhaps less immediately obvious than the Jeff/Britta thing, is a lot more enjoyable for everyone watching the show." He also remarked that "the episode still spent a fair amount of time with the other men in the cast and working out their issues" and that Troy moving in with Pierce was "a nice set-up for next season."

Emily VanDerWerff of The A.V. Club was more critical of the episode, giving it a B and opining that while the episode was "very funny", it "forces quite a bit of stuff." She wrote that she "did like the vibe the episode gave off of a bunch of people coming to the end of their first year of college and realizing that they really do like each other as much as they always said they did", but felt the kiss between Jeff and Annie "didn't have the chemistry the two had in the debate episode, simply because there was no build to it." However, she did compliment Jeff's final speech to Annie as "ridiculously well written" and felt that "Abed's attempts to turn the scenario into a season finale were both funny and an odd commentary on the strengths of the Troy and Abed friendship." Andy Greenwald of Vulture thought many of the smaller details in the episode, including the return of many guest stars and Troy eating an enormous cookie, were amusing, but he "didn't dig Britta and Professor Statistics catfighting over Jeff for no good reason." Similarly to VanDerWerff, he commented that while the final kiss had chemistry, "it didn't really feel necessary." Margaret Lyons of Entertainment Weekly criticized the kiss, remarking, "Much as I love the energy between Joel McHale and Allison [sic] Brie, this isn’t a couple I want to see go the distance."

In a retrospective ranking of all 110 episodes of Community, Cory Barker of TV.com placed the episode 60th, remarking that it "did some lovely and fun things with the concept of the season finale and love triangles."
