= Pilot (Community) =

- Community episode
- Episode no.: Season 1 Episode 1
- Directed by: Anthony Russo; Joe Russo
- Written by: Dan Harmon
- Production code: 100
- Original air date: September 17, 2009

Guest appearances
- John Oliver as Dr. Ian Duncan; Jim Rash as Dean Craig Pelton

Episode chronology
← Previous —	Next → "Spanish 101"
- Community season 1

"Pilot" is the first episode of the first season of the NBC sitcom Community. It aired in the United States on September 17, 2009. Written by Dan Harmon, the show's creator, the episode was directed by Anthony Russo and Joe Russo. The episode introduces Jeffrey Winger (Joel McHale), a disbarred lawyer who is forced to attend community college to get his license back. He tries to exploit his friendship with one of the faculty members for easy credits, but fails, and is forced to join a Spanish study group. The members of this study group make up the main cast of the series.

The show takes place at the fictional Greendale Community College in Greendale, Colorado. Harmon based the show on his own experiences in community college and partly modeled the character of Jeffrey Winger on himself. He emphasized the cast's importance to the show and also credited some of the actors for their improvisational skills. The episode attracted generally favorable reviews from Rotten Tomatoes, which praised both the actors and the comedy writing. The show received good viewership and stood out in NBC's Thursday lineup, where the network's other shows suffered declines in ratings.

== Plot ==
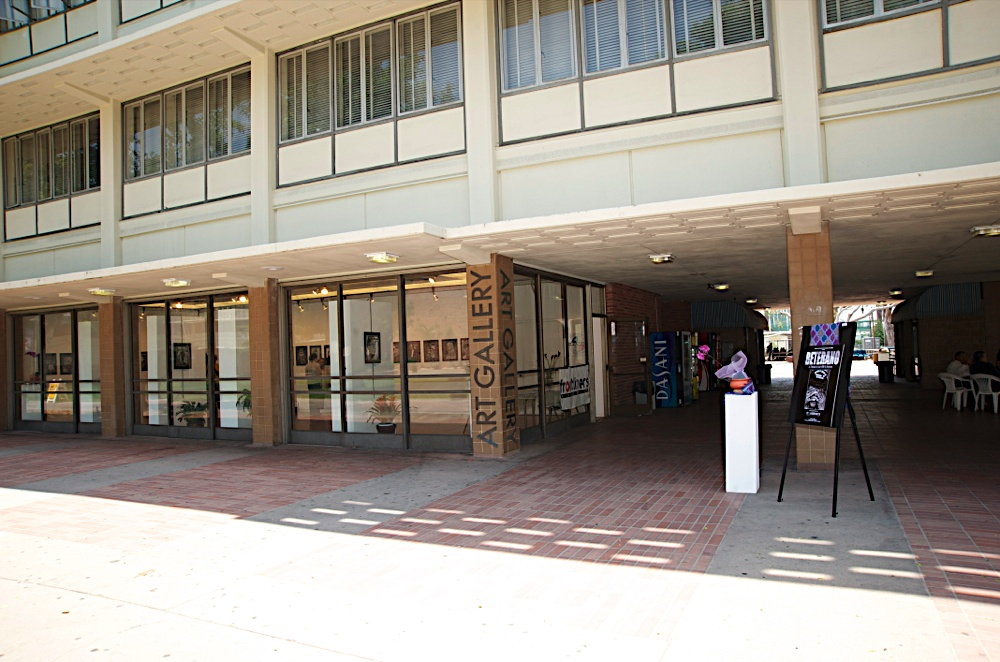
The outdoor scenes in the show were shot at the Los Angeles City College.

Jeffrey Winger (Joel McHale), a lawyer disbarred for having falsified his degree, has enrolled at Greendale Community College as a condition for getting his license back. His plan is to use his friendship with Dr. Ian Duncan, a professor at the college and Jeff's client, to obtain test answers. In the cafeteria, Jeff meets the attractive Britta Perry (Gillian Jacobs) and, in an attempt to get closer to her, convinces her to join his non-existent Spanish study group. As the study group convenes, Jeff pretends the other members simply did not show up. Britta, however, has invited Abed Nadir (Danny Pudi) to join them. Jeff unsuccessfully tries to make him leave and then gets called to the football field by Dr. Duncan, who makes a futile attempt to appeal to Jeff's conscience and eventually agrees to provide the answers. Jeff returns to the study group, discovering that Abed has also invited Troy (Donald Glover), Shirley (Yvette Nicole Brown), Pierce (Chevy Chase) and Annie (Alison Brie). Finding Britta smoking a cigarette outside, he suggests the two study alone, but she persuades him to return.

Jeff, eager to get away, deliberately stirs up a fight among the group then leaves once more to get the test answers. Dr. Duncan hands him a sealed envelope, but only in return for Jeff's Lexus. When Jeff returns, the group is in turmoil, and Britta promises to go out with him if he can restore order. He does this through an inspirational speech, but Britta sees through his lies and asks him to leave. Jeff then comes clean about everything, adding that since he now has the test answers, he does not need the study group. As the group turns against him, he leaves.

Leaving the building, Jeff finds all the pages in the envelope to be blank. He returns to the office of Dr. Duncan, who tells him that he wanted to teach him a lesson, although Jeff gets his car keys back. As he is about to leave campus, Jeff runs into Pierce and Troy and shows his ability to make people feel better about themselves through advice and encouragement. The others join, and Jeff admits to being a fraud. He says that he does not have the test answers, and that he will probably flunk next day's test. The group has now taken a liking to him, and they invite him back in. The episode ends with a dedication to the recently deceased John Hughes, whose film The Breakfast Club had been repeatedly referenced throughout the episode.

== Cast and characters ==
The pilot emphasizes character introduction, and a great deal of biographical information about the various main characters is revealed in the episode.

- Joel McHale as Jeff Winger – A smooth-talking lawyer who was debarred once it was revealed that his college degree was "less than legitimate". The condition of his reinstatement is that he finishes a college degree.
- Chevy Chase as Pierce Hawthorne – He is implicitly described by the college dean as one of the school's "old people keeping their minds active as they circle the drains of eternity". He is a retired entrepreneur who made a fortune on moist towelettes. He has been married seven times and has now decided to go back to college.
- Gillian Jacobs as Britta Perry – Who dropped out of high school because she thought it would impress Radiohead. She then joined a group of anarchists who vandalized billboards. She has been in the Peace Corps and done foot modeling before she enrolled at Greendale. She is strongly concerned with honesty, and does not take lightly to anyone lying to her.
- Danny Pudi as Abed Nadir – Abed is a Palestinian/Polish man who – according to Jeff – has Asperger syndrome. He proves helpful to Jeff with his ability to obtain quick and detailed knowledge of everyone he meets.
- Yvette Nicole Brown as Shirley Bennett – A "middle-aged divorcee" who "has made some bad life choices" and is going to school to start a brownie business.
- Alison Brie as Annie Edison – An 18-year old who dropped out of high school after becoming addicted to Adderall
- Donald Glover as Troy Barnes – A high school football star who injured himself, costing himself the chance to get a scholarship.
- John Oliver as Dr. Ian Duncan, psychology teacher at Greendale. – Dr. Duncan once faced a DUI charge but was acquitted thanks to Jeff's help.
- Jim Rash as Dean Pelton – Dean Pelton is first introduced while giving his introductory speech to the new students, a speech that ends up being unintentionally offensive.

== Casting ==
Harmon has emphasized the importance of the cast to making the premise of the comedy work. "Casting was 95 percent of putting the show together," he said in an interview. He had worked with several of the cast members earlier; Joel McHale, John Oliver and Chevy Chase all had cameo roles in episode 9 of Water and Power, the short film series produced by Harmon for Channel 101. Actor Chevy Chase had long been a favorite of Harmon. Though principally not very partial to sitcoms, Chase was persuaded to take the job by the quality of the show's writing. Harmon saw similarities between Chase and the character he plays on the show. Though Chase has often been ridiculed for his career choices, Harmon believed this role could be redeeming: "What makes Chevy and Pierce heroic is this refusal to stop." Harmon had to warn Chase against playing a "wise-ass" the way he often does in his roles, since the character of Pierce is a rather pathetic figure who is normally the butt of the joke himself.

McHale – known from the E! comedy The Soup – was also, like Chase, impressed by Harmon's writing. He commented that "after reading Dan's script it was so head and shoulders above everything else that I was reading." McHale appealed to Harmon because of his likable quality, which allowed the character to possess certain unsympathetic traits without turning the viewer against him. For the role of Annie, Harmon wanted someone who would resemble Tracy Flick, Reese Witherspoon's character from the 1999 movie Election. Originally the producers were looking for a Latina or Asian Tracy Flick, for greater diversity, but could not find any. Instead, they ended up casting Alison Brie, known from her role as Trudy Campbell on Mad Men.

== Production ==
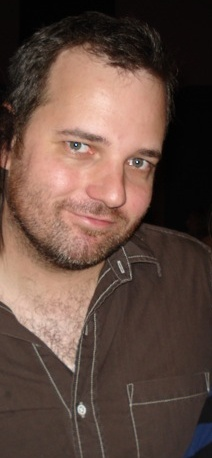
The show's creator, Dan Harmon, was himself enrolled at a community college for a period.

The premise of Community was based on Harmon's real-life experiences. In an attempt to save his relationship with his then-girlfriend, he once enrolled in Glendale Community College, north of Los Angeles, where they would take Spanish together. Harmon got involved in a study group and – somewhat against his own instincts – became closely connected to the group of people with whom he had very little in common. "...I was in this group with these knuckleheads and I started really liking them," he explained, "even though they had nothing to do with the film industry and I had nothing to gain from them and nothing to offer them." With this as the background, Harmon wrote the show with a main character largely based on himself. He had, like Jeff, been self-centered and independent to the extreme before he realised the value of connecting with other people.

About the creative process behind the writing, Harmon says that he had to write the show as if it were a movie, not a sitcom. Essentially, he says, the process was no different from the earlier work he had done, except for the length and the target demographic. Filming the show involved a lot of improvisation, particularly from Chevy Chase. Harmon said about Chase that he "tends to come up with lines that you can actually end scenes with sometimes." He also mentioned Joel McHale and Donald Glover as adept improvisers.

== Reception ==
Premiering in the 9:30 pm time slot on September 17, 2009, the pilot episode had a viewership of 7.680 million. In the 18–49 audience, it had a rating of 3.7. As such, it held 93% of this audience from The Office, which had been in the previous time slot. The show was called the "bright spot for the night" for NBC, considering that The Office was down 18% from the previous year's premiere, while Parks and Recreation, in the preceding time slot, was down 30%.

The pilot episode of Community received generally favorable reviews from critics. The aggregate review website Metacritic gives the show a score of 69 out of 100, based on 23 reviews. Entertainment Weekly's Ken Tucker called it "One of the new season's best sitcoms", and gave it a grade B+. Heather Havrilesky, writing for Salon.com, agreed with this assessment and commended the "alarmingly smart writing". Alan Sepinwall at The Star-Ledger similarly called it "the best, and funniest, new show of the season," and said he laughed just as much after seeing the pilot four times. Others were less impressed; Variety's Brian Lowry found the satire wanting and did not much appreciate McHale's performance. The Miami Herald's Glenn Garvin found that, though particularly McHale was capable of generating "sporadic laughter", the show was just not very amusing.
