= Investigative Journalism (Community) =

- Community episode
- Episode no.: Season 1 Episode 13
- Directed by: Joe Russo
- Written by: Jon Pollack; Tim Hobert
- Production code: 113
- Original air date: January 14, 2010

Guest appearances
- Jack Black as Buddy; Jim Rash as Dean Craig Pelton; Dino Stamatopoulos as Star-Burns; DC Pierson as Marc Milliot; Owen Wilson as Other Study Group Leader (uncredited)

Episode chronology
← Previous "Comparative Religion"	Next → "Interpretive Dance"
- Community season 1

"Investigative Journalism" is the thirteenth episode of the first season of the American comedy television series Community. It aired in the United States on NBC on January 14, 2010.

== Plot ==
The group returns from their winter break and finds that a new student named Buddy (Jack Black) has inserted himself into the study group. Buddy proves to be a burden to the group, accidentally kicking Jeff in the nose, making abrupt comments when they try to study, and overall messing with the flow of the group. Eventually, the group decides Buddy must leave the group. When the group tells this to Buddy, he refuses to leave, and Jeff drags him off outside (Buddy's pants being ripped in the process). Eventually, Jeff decides that he thinks Buddy should be allowed to join the group if he pleases, and the group changes their minds to allow Buddy to join. After telling Buddy, he reveals that they were his safety study group and joins another study group (led by Owen Wilson), which he claims to be cooler.

Meanwhile, Dean Pelton (Jim Rash) makes Jeff (Joel McHale) the new editor of the Greendale Gazette Journal Mirror, where Annie (Alison Brie) discovers a story about Dean Pelton's racial profiling in the school. Jeff tries to convince a resistant Annie to drop the story, and she eventually ends up abandoning it, realizing how trivial it actually is.

In the end tag, Troy (Donald Glover) and Abed (Danny Pudi) are interviewed by Star-Burns (Dino Stamatopoulos) for possible membership in the cool group. Pierce (Chevy Chase) shows up and berates them for their disloyalty. After they walk away, Pierce asks if the group has decided on his own membership, which Star-Burns declines.

== Cultural references ==
Abed compares Jeff to the M*A*S*H character Hawkeye Pierce, and himself to the character Radar. The episode also parodies that show's ending credits, including the same tune.

== Continuity ==
- Flashbacks to previous episodes such as "Spanish 101" and "Advanced Criminal Law" are shown.

== Reception ==
Around 5.42 million Americans watched "Investigative Journalism".

Emily VanDerWerff of The A.V. Club rated the episode A−, saying it was "yet another really great episode in a very consistent run the show's been on lately."
