= Conspiracy Theories and Interior Design =

- Community episode
- Episode no.: Season 2 Episode 9
- Directed by: Adam Davidson
- Written by: Chris McKenna
- Production code: 210
- Original air date: November 18, 2010

Guest appearances
- Kevin Corrigan as Professor Professorson/Professor Woolley/Professor Sean Garrity; Jim Rash as Dean Craig Pelton; Craig Cackowski as Officer Cackowski; Richard Erdman as Leonard; Peggy Stewart as Agnes; Dominik Musiol as Pavel

Episode chronology
| ← Previous "Cooperative Calligraphy" | Next → "Mixology Certification" |
- Community season 2

"Conspiracy Theories and Interior Design" (alternate title "Conspiracy Theories and Soft Defenses") is the ninth episode of the second season of the American comedy television series Community, and the 34th episode of the series overall. It aired in the United States on NBC on November 18, 2010.

== Plot ==
Dean Pelton (Jim Rash) accuses Jeff (Joel McHale) of creating a fake course on conspiracy theories taught by "Professor Professorson." Jeff leads the dean and Annie (Alison Brie) to Professorson's supposed office, which is revealed to be a closet. He starts explaining this must be a conspiracy to test him until a nearby man (Kevin Corrigan) introduces himself as Professorson. He explains that he usually teaches night school, congratulates Jeff, and departs. Satisfied, the dean leaves, but when Annie apologizes for doubting Jeff, Jeff admits he faked the class and has never seen "Professorson" before.

Troy (Donald Glover) and Abed (Danny Pudi) build a blanket fort in Abed's dorm; other students help to expand the fort. Annie discovers that Professorson's real name is Professor Woolley. Despite threatening messages, the two explore the night school, which they discover is a sham. After a chase through the now-sprawling fort, they catch Woolley (playing the Trīdeksnis during a Latvian independence parade). He explains that like Jeff, he once forged a course for credit; to maintain the charade, he had to fake an entire night school. Suspicious, Jeff recognizes Woolley as drama professor Sean Garrity, who drops the façade and reveals the dean staged everything to teach Jeff a lesson. Jeff decides to get even.

Jeff and Annie bring in the Dean and pretend to expose "Woolley"'s sham. Feigning a lack of forgiveness, Annie "shoots" Garrity with a prop gun. The dean suddenly shoots Annie; in response, Jeff shoots the dean. Annie sits up and tells Jeff she and the dean created the night school ploy to teach Jeff a lesson about academic dishonesty. The dean then sits up, and Jeff, who had deduced that Annie helped the dean, reveals he and the dean wanted to teach Annie about being a better friend. Upset, Annie reveals another gun and shoots Jeff. When she confronts the dean over betraying her for Jeff, he admits that he spontaneously decided to side with Jeff, due to being unable to keep track of the increasing number of conspiracies. Jeff sits up and explains that he and Annie created the ploy with another prop gun because the dean switches alliances too quickly. Garrity rises and collects the guns, but a police officer (Craig Cackowski) enters and shoots Garrity, horrifying the other three until they realize it was yet another prop gun – the officer and Garrity wanted to show the dangers of misusing prop guns. However, the dean, having been traumatized by the mass shootout, still denies Jeff credit for the class.

Later, Abed and Troy see the fort town mentioned in Greendale's newspaper, making it "mainstream." With that, they collapse the entire fort.

== Production ==
The episode was written by Chris McKenna, his fourth writing credit on the series. It was directed by Adam Davidson, his fourth time directing the series. He has previously directed episodes for series like Big Love, Fringe and United States of Tara.

Harmon stated in the DVD commentary that the third act was written at the last minute, and that they did not know how the conspiracy storyline would resolve for much of the episode's production.

== Reception ==
In its original American broadcast, "Conspiracy Theories And Interior Design" reached approximately 4.4 million households with a 1.9 rating/6% share in the 18–49 demographic.

The episode received positive reviews from the critics. Cory Barker, of TV Surveillance, said, "good lord [it] is hilariously funny and flat-out fun" and "'Conspiracy Theories and Interior Design' is simply an amazingly fun episode of the best comedy on television at the height of its powers."

Furthermore, Kelsea Stahler, of hollywood.com, said "The 'Conspiracy Theories and Interior Design' episode is a departure from the outlandish, grand zombie- space-simulator-Betty White fueled romps and a return to the formula that the show perfected back in season one. The show also keeps the childish wonder and the ensuing hilarity that Donald Glover's Troy brings to it with a subplot in which he and Abed create a blanket-fort city that takes over an entire dorm. Say what you will about relying on formula, but Community's formula is 100 percent its own and when it comes to this stuff, nobody does it better."
