= The Art of Discourse =

- Community episode
- Episode no.: Season 1 Episode 22
- Directed by: Adam Davidson
- Written by: Chris McKenna
- Production code: 124
- Original air date: April 29, 2010

Guest appearances
- Lisa Rinna as Chantelle Cahill; Jared Kusnitz as Mark Cahill; Dean Collins as Scott Waugh; Aaron Hill as Pizza Guy; Richard Erdman as Leonard; Jillian Rose Reed as Kelly Cortlandt

Episode chronology
← Previous "Contemporary American Poultry"	Next → "Modern Warfare"
- Community (season 1)

"The Art of Discourse" is the twenty-second episode of the first season of the American comedy television series Community. It aired in the United States on NBC on April 29, 2010.

== Plot ==
Abed (Danny Pudi) shares with the group his film-inspired social goals for an ideal first year of college, including pantsing. This goal is quickly realized when he and Troy (Donald Glover) pull each other's pants down. Pierce (Chevy Chase), eager to participate in the group's fun, proceeds to pull down Shirley's (Yvette Nicole Brown) pants, which deeply offends her. When Pierce refuses to apologize, dismissing it as a harmless joke, the group decides to kick him out. However, they soon realize that without Pierce, they no longer have a scapegoat to direct their frustrations at. This leads them to try to convince Pierce to apologize, but when he fails to do so sincerely, Shirley decides to leave the group instead. Ironically, this situation causes Shirley and Pierce to bond while spending time together in the library.

Meanwhile, as Troy helps Abed complete his list of social goals, Jeff (Joel McHale) and Britta (Gillian Jacobs) find themselves mocked for attending community college by a group of high school students taking early classes at Greendale. Seeking revenge, Jeff decides to seduce the leader's mother. His plan initially succeeds, but it backfires when she finds out the truth and begins behaving immaturely, similar to the high schoolers. This culminates in a mimicry battle between Jeff, Britta, and the high schoolers in the cafeteria, which goes on for several minutes. The battle ends when Shirley and Pierce pants the students, distracting them enough to lose. In retaliation, the high schoolers start a food fight, which happens to be another item on Abed's list of goals.

In the episode's end tag, Troy and Abed sit in the student lounge discussing their "porn names", derived from the name of their grade school and favorite soft drink.

== Cultural references ==
Abed and Troy's storyline in this episode parodies college-set comedy films, particularly the 1978 film Animal House. References include Abed smashing Pierce's guitar, Abed and Troy dressing up in togas, and the use of freeze-frame labels at the end of the episode that reveal the personal futures of both the main characters and one-off characters. Although he wasn't in Animal House, Chevy Chase, who plays Pierce Hawthorne, had connections to the film's cast and crew due to his work with National Lampoon, his time on Saturday Night Live, and his role in the 1980 sports comedy film Caddyshack.

Jeff tries to mock one of his bullies by joking that his mother was going to audition for Real Housewives ; Lisa Rinna, a later star on Real Housewives of Beverly Hills, plays the bully's mom.

== Reception ==
Around 4.36 million Americans watched "The Art of Discourse."

Emily VanDerWerff of The A.V. Club gave the episode a grade of 'B', stating that while she "liked the other two plotlines in the episode quite a bit", the main Jeff/Britta plot was difficult to enjoy because she "just couldn't get past how irritating the characters were."
