= English as a Second Language (Community) =

- Community episode
- Episode no.: Season 1 Episode 24
- Directed by: Gail Mancuso
- Written by: Tim Hobert
- Production code: 120
- Original air date: May 13, 2010

Guest appearances
- Jim Rash as Dean Craig Pelton; Jerry Minor as Jerry the Janitor; Marlene Forte as Doctora Escodora; Dino Stamatopoulos as Star-Burns

Episode chronology
← Previous "Modern Warfare"	Next → "Pascal's Triangle Revisited"
- Community season 1

"English as a Second Language" is the twenty-fourth and penultimate episode of the first season of the American comedy television series Community. It aired in the United States on NBC on May 13, 2010. In the episode, a revelation from Señor Chang threatens the study group's Spanish credit, and Troy discovers his skill at plumbing. It received generally positive reviews.

== Plot ==
Señor Chang (Ken Jeong) privately reveals to Jeff (Joel McHale) that he, like Jeff, faked his credentials and does not have a teaching degree. The conversation is inadvertently recorded by Annie (Alison Brie), who records all classes for taking notes. When Dean Pelton (Jim Rash) finds out, Chang is replaced by Dr. Escodera (Marlene Forte), who is stricter and will make the Spanish class take a harder final exam. The class worries they will not be able to pass the new exam. Meanwhile, Troy (Donald Glover) discovers he has a natural talent for fixing plumbing. A persistent maintenance worker (Jerry Minor) urges him to use his talent to become a plumber, but Troy turns down the offer in favor of his education.

As everyone faces the fact that they will have to retake Spanish, Jeff realizes that Annie was the one who turned in Chang, as she wanted to keep the group together by keeping them in a shared class. The rest of the study group shuns her as they try to cram for the exam. Abed (Danny Pudi) tries to encourage Troy to pursue plumbing, but Troy, misunderstanding, gets angry because he thinks Abed does not want him around.

As the exam is about to start, Shirley (Yvette Nicole Brown) gets a text from Annie, who explains she's trying to make things better with Chang. Worried about how Chang will react, the study group runs to his office, where he explains that getting fired was good for him and that Annie is helping him plan a new future. After taking the exam, Troy and Abed reconcile, and the group agrees to take anthropology next year.

In the end tag, the study group finds out they all passed the Spanish finals. It is then implied that Pierce (Chevy Chase) had slept with Dr. Escodera to ensure that the Spanish finals would be easy enough for everyone to pass.

== Production ==
The episode was written by Tim Hobert, his fifth writing credit for the show, and was directed by Gail Mancuso in her first credit for the show.

== Cultural references ==
The subplot where Troy discovers his skills as a plumber is inspired by the film Good Will Hunting, with Abed's encouragement paralleling Ben Affleck's role in the film. However, the details are somewhat reversed in that Troy is being called to a trade instead of to further education. When chiding Annie for her actions, Jeff tells the group to picture her as Paul Giamatti and comments that the friends in Sisterhood of the Traveling Pants didn't do such things. After their exam, Abed likens Troy's understanding of the test to his grasp of The Wire.

== Reception ==
In its original broadcast, the episode was watched by approximately 4.49 million Americans and achieved a 2.0/7 in the 18-49 demographic.

The episode received generally positive reviews, with many critics noting the challenges of following up the previous episode. Emily VanDerWerff of The A.V. Club gave the episode an A−, commenting that after "Modern Warfare," "pretty much anything Community did would seem like a disappointment" but that the episode mostly avoids that issue by "taking a hard left into the series master plot." She also noted that the episode "nicely dealt with the show's central conflicts without being too heavy-handed" and thought it "feels quite a bit like a season finale." Jonah Krakow of IGN gave the episode 7.5 out of 10, denoting a "good" episode. He wrote that it "felt like just another sitcom" and "really wasn't that bad, just weaker than usual," especially compared to the last few episodes. He also praised guest actors Dino Stamatopoulos and Jerry Minor for their roles. Alan Sepinwall of Uproxx called it "a more character-driven – but still very funny – episode," noting the "nice character duet for Annie and Jeff." Like VanDerWerff, he also noted the episode felt like a season finale, asking, "[W]hat exactly do Dan Harmon and company have up their sleeves for the actual finale?"
