= Comparative religion (disambiguation) =

Comparative religion is the systematic comparison of the doctrines and practices of the world's religions.

Comparative Religion may also refer to:

- Comparative Religion (book), a book by Frank Byron Jevons
- "Comparative Religion" (Community), an episode of American comedy television series Community

== See also ==
- Studies in Comparative Religion, an academic journal published from 1963 to 1987
