= Debate 109 =

- Community episode
- Episode no.: Season 1 Episode 9
- Directed by: Joe Russo
- Written by: Tim Hobert
- Production code: 109
- Original air date: November 12, 2009

Guest appearances
- John Michael Higgins as Professor Eustice Whitman; Jim Rash as Dean Craig Pelton; Aaron Himelstein as Jeremy Simmons; Candace Brown as Jean Wilson

Episode chronology
← Previous "Home Economics"	Next → "Environmental Science"
- Community season 1

"Debate 109" is the ninth episode of the first season of the American sitcom Community. It originally aired in the United States on NBC on November 12, 2009, to an audience of 5.09 million viewers. The episode received mostly positive reviews, though the Jeff and Annie romance was met with mixed reviews. The episode was directed by Joe Russo and written by Tim Hobert.

In the episode, Jeff teams up with Annie to take on City College in a debate. Meanwhile, the study group attempts to figure out if Abed's student films are predicting their futures, and Pierce tries to help Britta quit smoking using hypnotherapy.

== Plot ==
Britta is on edge as she tries to quit smoking, and Pierce offers to help her quit using hypnotherapy. Troy shows the study group a film made by Abed that closely resembles a conversation the group had the previous week; however, the film was made two weeks ago. In the hallway, Annie, Dean Pelton and Professor Whitman ask Jeff to fill in as Annie's partner in the debate against City College. Greendale will argue that man is evil, while City College will argue man is good. Jeff reluctantly agrees but blows off preparing, citing his experience as a lawyer. In their first session, Pierce attempts to hypnotize Britta but is clearly inept.

During the debate, City College's team, led by Jeremy Simmons, jumps to an early lead, but an interruption by the basketball team forces the rest of the debate to be delayed. Afterwards Simmons taunts Jeff and Annie; after a particularly hurtful taunt towards Annie, Jeff vows to defeat him. Shirley confronts Abed about his films, Abed explains he is not psychic, he just understands the study group so well that he can predict their behavior. To reassure Shirley, he shows her his next film, which includes a scene of Jeff and Annie kissing; Shirley laughs it off. As Jeff and Annie study for the debate, she urges him to prepare better; he responds by telling her to loosen up. Shirley tells Jeff and Annie about their characters kissing in Abed's film, which leads to awkward tension between the two. Pierce and Britta have another hypnosis session; he realizes she is awake and goads her into revealing her deception by telling her to picture a threesome with him.

The debate resumes, and Jeff and Annie manage to take the lead. In a last-second gambit, Simmons launches himself out of his wheelchair at Jeff, prompting Jeff to catch him. Annie then grabs Jeff and kissing him; surprised, he drops Simmons. Annie proclaims that Jeff's response proves that man is evil, and Greendale wins. Britta, who had pulled out a cigarette to cope with the stress of watching the debate, suddenly feels repulsed imagining herself in a threesome with Pierce. Shirley leaves feeling more convinced of Abed's "powers", but Abed is able to convince her it is a fluke. Jeff and Annie congratulate each other on their victory, though there is still awkwardness between them.

== Production ==
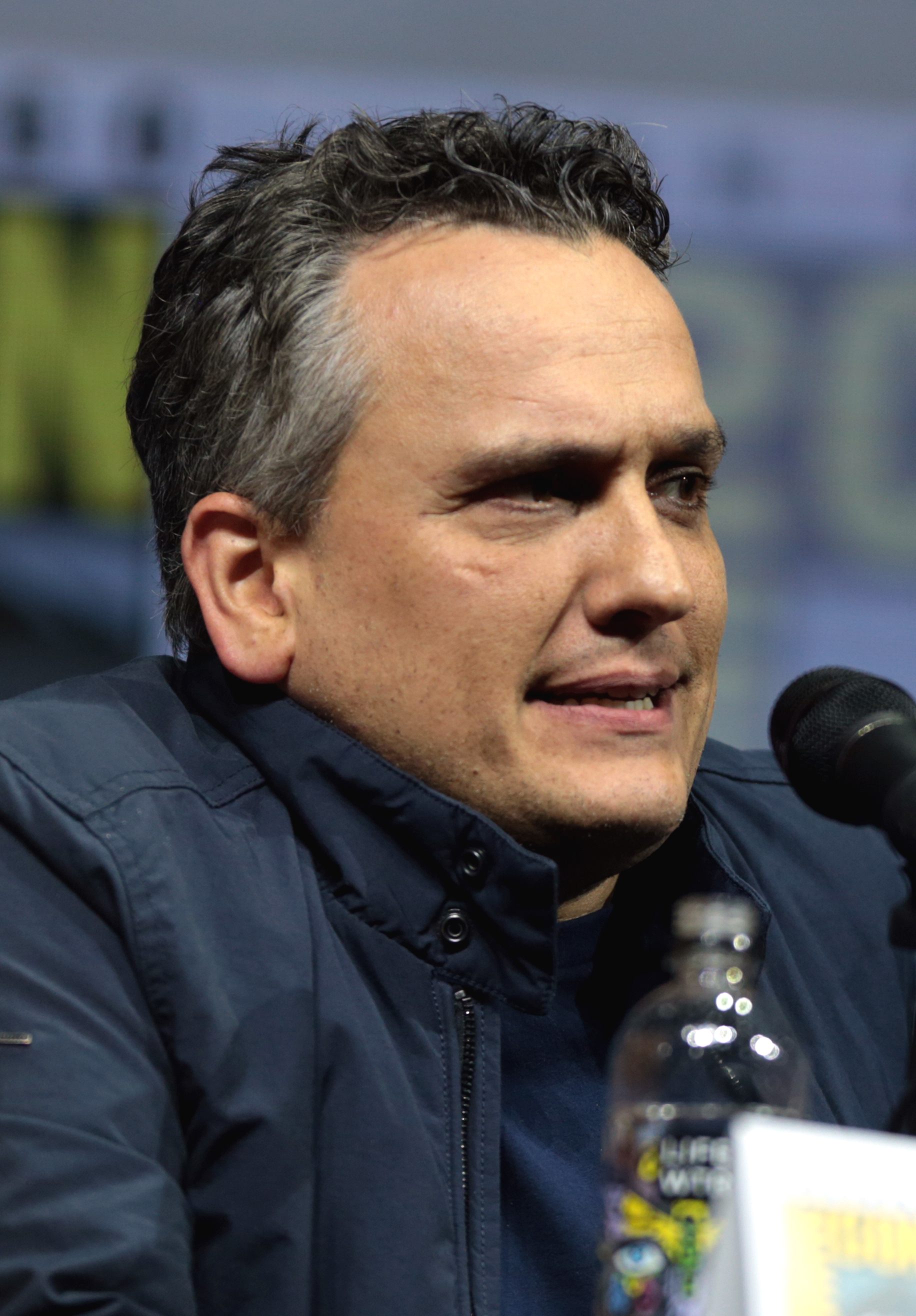
Joe Russo directed the episode

"Debate 109" was written by Tim Hobert and directed by Joe Russo. The episode stars Joel McHale, Gillian Jacobs, Danny Pudi, Yvette Nicole Brown, Alison Brie, Donald Glover, and Chevy Chase as Jeff Winger, Britta Perry, Abed Nadir, Shirley Bennett, Troy Barnes, Annie Edison, and Pierce Hawthorne, respectively. Compared to previous episodes Jacobs's character plays a reduced role. The episode guest stars Aaron Himelstein as Jeremy Simmons. John Michael Higgins appears in a recurring role as Professor Eustice Whitman. It is the first episodes to featured the Jeff and Annie dynamic, particularly their romance.

While the episode only shows brief glimpses of Abed's movies, the full versions were still produced. Entitled Community College Chronicles, they were released by NBC as promotion around the time of the episode's premiere and include an appearance by Sandeep Parikh of The Guild. When watching one of Abed's films, Troy asks if his character is crying after listening to "Come Sail Away" by Styx. This line is later referenced during Donald Glover's departure in the season 5 episode "Geothermal Escapism". "Debate 109" features the song "Home" by Edward Sharpe and the Magnetic Zeros, the episode premiered prior to the song's release. The episode also contains the Electric Light Orchestra song "Evil Woman".

== Reception ==
"Debate 109" was first aired in the United States on NBC on November 10, 2009. The original broadcast was seen by 5.09 million American viewers, earning a 3.2/5 among all households. It also scored a 2.1/6 in the 18-49 demographic.

=== Critical reception ===
The episode received mostly positive reviews from critics. Emily St. James of The A.V. Club gave the episode an "A" and proclaimed it "the best episode of Community so far". She praised the parts about Abed's films, remarking that he "turned the show's meta commentary into a plot that was as much about himself and his keen observational powers as anything else" and that the concept "found a way to both make fun of itself and justify itself within that plotline". She also enjoyed the chemistry between Alison Brie and Joel McHale, which "made the whole plot less creepy than it should have been (the age gap between the two characters should be troublesome)." Sean Gandert of Paste gave the episode an 8.8, remarking that "as far as pure humor goes this was the best thing in the night". He remarked that Abed's plot "doesn't have so much resolution, which is kinda nice" and liked the "Annie/Joel thing" [sic] and its potential for future storylines. John Young of Entertainment Weekly called the episode "one of [the show's] sharpest episodes thus far" and argued it "should become a rubric of what the series needs to do each week to succeed."

In a more mixed review, Jonah Krakow of IGN thought the episode contained too many plots, arguing, "If they could tighten everything up and intertwine the disparate threads running throughout each episode, it would go along [sic] way towards reaching the space that The Office and 30 Rock occupy." While he enjoyed Abed's film series, he was unsure how to feel about Jeff and Annie's "budding attraction" and thought Britta and Pierce's story "felt completely tacked on and had little bearing on anything else." He ultimately gave the episode 7 out of 10, denoting a "good" episode. Andy Greenwald of Vulture remarked after the episode that "the simultaneously best and worst thing we can say about the show is that it remains promising". He noted that having sexual tension between Jeff and Annie "might be pushing it" given their age gap but found the subplot with Pierce and Britta enjoyable, noting that "the best jokes can sometimes be as simple as having Chevy Chase pratfall into a drum set." He also singled out guest stars Higgins and Himelstein for their roles.

Joe Matar of Den of Geek included it on his list of the show's best episodes, commenting, "It's not that it does anything too unique; it just shows off that it's a really well-written sitcom."
