= Romantic Expressionism =

- Community episode
- Episode no.: Season 1 Episode 15
- Directed by: Joe Russo
- Written by: Andrew Guest
- Production code: 115
- Original air date: February 4, 2010

Guest appearances
- Eric Christian Olsen as Vaughn; Richard Erdman as Leonard; Dino Stamatopoulos as Star-Burns; DC Pierson as Marc Milliot; Derek Mears as Kickpuncher; Angela Trimbur as Woman; Randall Park as Crime Boss

Episode chronology
← Previous "Interpretative Dance"	Next → "Communication Studies"
- Community season 1

"Romantic Expressionism" is the fifteenth episode of the first season of the U.S. television series Community. It was originally aired on February 4, 2010, on NBC.

In the episode, Jeff and Britta try to break up Annie's budding romance with Vaughn, whom Britta previously dated. However, their ploy fails and results in hurt feelings. Meanwhile, Pierce tries very hard to prove that he has a sense of humor.

The episode was written by Andrew Guest and directed by Joe Russo. It received strong praise from critics.

== Plot ==
Jeff (Joel McHale) and Britta (Gillian Jacobs) are concerned about Annie's (Alison Brie) budding relationship with Vaughn (Eric Christian Olsen), Britta's ex. Annie asks for Britta's blessing to date him, which she gives. Despite this, Britta and Jeff, assuming the roles of Annie's parental figures, decide to get Troy (Donald Glover), Annie's previous crush, interested in her in order to prevent her from developing relationships with creepier men. The plan fails miserably, leaving Annie, Troy, and Vaughn all upset.

Meanwhile, Abed (Danny Pudi) invites Troy, Shirley (Yvette Nicole Brown), and Señor Chang (Ken Jeong) to his dorm to watch and make fun of Kickpuncher. However, they are reluctant to invite Pierce (Chevy Chase) due to his peculiar sense of humor, but he decides to go anyway. At the viewing party, Troy, Abed, Shirley, and Chang all crack jokes at the film that are appreciated by the rest, but Pierce can only come up with lame and racist zingers. Abed invites the party back to watch the sequel the next night.

To avoid rejection again, Pierce holds a meeting with a comedy sketch troupe to prepare jokes for the upcoming viewing. During the viewing, Pierce easily churns out jokes, but it is apparent to the rest that his jokes were pre-planned. Pierce then reveals his frustration at not being seen as funny by the group. As he exits the room, he trips and falls, finally drawing laughter from the rest of the party.

The next day at the study room, Jeff and Britta apologize to Annie and accept that she is an adult who can handle her own relationships. The conversation then turns heated as each member of the group reveals their interests in and jealousies of other members and their relationships. They realize the fact that they, unlike a real family, all have the potential to see each other as romantic and sexual prospects. Vaughn then emerges outside the library and plays a song for Annie. With Britta's genuine approval this time, Annie gladly reunites with him.

== Production ==
"Romantic Expressionism" was written by Andrew Guest, his second writing credit of the series. It was directed by Joe Russo, his seventh directing credit.

== Cultural references ==
The fictional movie Kickpuncher is a parody of 1980s sci fi action films trying — and failing — to emulate the success of RoboCop. The practice of poking fun at movies while watching them was made popular in the television series Mystery Science Theater 3000. While Pierce is preparing jokes with the sketch comedy troupe, he demands, "I need Phyllis Diller-grade stuff!"

Vaughn referred to Shirley as "that Sherri Shepherd lady." Abed compared the group's dynamic to the 1970s sitcom The Brady Bunch.

== Reception ==
=== Ratings ===
In its original American broadcast, "Romantic Expressionism" drew an estimated 5.2 million viewers, with a Nielsen rating/share of 2.3/7 in the 18–49 demographic.

=== Reviews ===
The episode received universally positive critical reviews. Emily VanDerWerff of The A.V. Club called "Romantic Expressionism" her favorite episode of the series so far, giving it an 'A'. Jonah Krakow of IGN called it the best episode of the season so far, adding he was "thrilled that Community is finally coming around and reaching the potential we all knew it had."

Critics praised the scene where members of the study group looked at one another as possible sexual partners and strong utilization of the show's ensemble cast. Krakow called it "best single scene of the season". Jason Hughes of AOL said, "This episode would have been great for the scene where the study group looked around the room thinking of one another sexually. Without a single word, there was so much spoken with facial expressions and eyes and turns of the head." VanDerWerff remarked, "It's almost perfectly executed, each joke rolling off the top of the previous jokes, calling back on the show's short history and establishing that these people really are as weird of a little group as they seem to be."

Alison Brie's performance was also widely acclaimed. Hughes said, "It still wows me that the 26-year old Alison Brie does such a great job at playing a teenager." Alan Sepinwall of The Star-Ledger said that Brie was "on fire", while VanDerWerff said she that "can do whatever the show tosses at her".
