= Social Psychology (Community) =

- Community episode
- Episode no.: Season 1 Episode 4
- Directed by: Anthony Russo
- Written by: Liz Cackowski
- Production code: 104
- Original air date: October 8, 2009

Guest appearances
- John Oliver as Dr. Ian Duncan; Eric Christian Olsen as Vaughn; Erik Charles Nielsen as Garrett; Dino Stamatopoulos as Star-Burns; Matt Jones as Stoner Friend

Episode chronology
← Previous "Introduction to Film"	Next → "Advanced Criminal Law"
- Community season 1

"Social Psychology" is the fourth episode of the first season of the American comedy television series Community. It aired in the United States on NBC on October 8, 2009. The episode shows Jeff bonding with Shirley through mockery of Britta's new romantic interest, Vaughn. Annie gets Abed to participate in a psychology experiment organized by Dr Ian Duncan. It received 4.87 million viewers in the United States and mixed critical reviews.

== Plot ==
Jeff (Joel McHale) has been making excuses to avoid walking with Shirley (Yvette Nicole Brown) to a class they have in the same section of campus. As Britta (Gillian Jacobs) begins spending time with a laid-back hippie, Vaughn (Eric Christian Olsen), Jeff becomes jealous. He begins to bond with Shirley over mocking Vaughn. Britta shows him a poem Vaughn wrote about her that perturbed her, and Jeff surreptitiously takes a photo of it to share with Shirley.

Pierce (Chevy Chase) overhears Jeff and Shirley mocking Vaughn's poem with his new "ear-noculars" that improve his hearing. He tries to confront them in front of the group, and they share Vaughn's poem; as they do so, Vaughn and Britta arrive and Vaughn, seeing the poem, breaks up with Britta. Shirley apologizes to Jeff, saying that she has had issues caused by her frequent gossiping in the past. The two agree not to gossip further, with the exception of Shirley telling him that Britta had a sex dream about him. Jeff attempts to reconcile with Britta, who reluctantly forgives him.

Meanwhile, Annie (Alison Brie) begs Duncan (John Oliver) to be an observer in his psychology experiment. She gets Troy (Donald Glover) and Abed (Danny Pudi) to be participants, Abed cancelling his plans to watch Indiana Jones movies after Annie invokes their friendship as a reason for him to help her. The experiment consists of the participants in a waiting room being repeatedly told that the experiment will begin shortly. Señor Chang (Ken Jeong) immediately throws a tantrum and leaves, but the other participants last longer. Finally, Troy has a breakdown and leaves, so only Abed remains. After 26 hours, Abed is still waiting, the observers now extremely frustrated, one of whom exasperatedly leaves. Duncan has a tantrum, blaming Annie for inviting Abed, and the experiment ends.

Annie explains the experiment to Troy and Abed and, frustrated at Abed, asks him why he stayed so long. Abed replies that he was furious but stayed because Annie called him a friend. Annie later apologizes, buying him DVDs of the Indiana Jones movies as an apology.

== End tag ==
In the end tag, Troy and Abed mock people they can see through the window of their study room, thinking the window is sound proof. Mimicking Jeff as he walks by, he replies that he can hear them through the window. The pair then pretend to be asleep.

== Analysis ==
The episode marks the first appearance of the recurring character Vaughn. Emily VanDerWerff of The A.V. Club wrote that Abed and Jeff serve to evoke more emotionally honest reactions from other characters: in this episode, Abed leads Annie to release her pent-up frustration, while Jeff brings out Shirley's tendency towards mockery. Both Annie and Shirley had received less screentime in previous episodes than the rest of the main cast. Danny Pham of Screen Rant commented that Abed's actions in the episode show his "fierce loyalty".

== Reception ==
Upon its first broadcast in the United States, an estimated 4.87 million viewers watched the episode.

VanDerWerff rated the episode a B+, praising the show for continuing to pair up different members of the main cast in its storylines. She positively reviewed Olsen's acting and the humor of the episode, finding many moments comedic due to context or the acting. However, Jonah Krakow of IGN gave the episode six out of ten in a negative review. Krakow criticized that there was a lack of humor, Shirley's character was becoming one-dimensional and Abed was poorly used in a storyline in which he had little dialogue. Entertainment Weekly's John Young did not enjoy the storyline with Vaughn, but praised the "budding friendship between Jeff and Shirley" and the "endearing" role of Duncan.
