= Contemporary American Poultry =

- Community episode
- Episode no.: Season 1 Episode 21
- Directed by: Tristram Shapeero
- Written by: Emily Cutler; Karey Dornetto
- Production code: 123
- Original air date: April 22, 2010

Guest appearances
- Jim Rash as Dean Craig Pelton; Dino Stamatopoulos as Star-Burns; Richard Erdman as Leonard; Erik Charles Nielsen as Garrett; Crystal the Monkey as Annie's Boobs

Episode chronology
← Previous "The Science of Illusion"	Next → "The Art of Discourse"
- Community season 1

"Contemporary American Poultry" is the twenty-first episode of the first season of the American comedy television series Community. It aired in the United States on NBC on April 22, 2010. In the episode, Jeff convinces the rest of the study group to help him skim chicken fingers from the cafeteria, but with Abed's help, the plan quickly spirals into a much larger operation. The episode is styled similarly to mafia movies, particularly the 1990 film Goodfellas.

It has received mostly positive reviews from critics.

== Plot ==
During one of their meetings, the study group leaves early for lunch to get chicken fingers, the only food served by the Greendale cafeteria that they enjoy; however, the cafeteria runs out before they can get any, as they are widely popular among students. Jeff (Joel McHale) gets angry when he notices Star-Burns (Dino Stamatopoulos), the fry cook, skimming chicken fingers for his friends. He convinces the rest of the study group to help him gain control of the kitchen. They work to get Star-Burns fired and Abed (Danny Pudi) hired as the new fry cook. Abed skims chicken for his friends as planned but also starts giving Señor Chang (Ken Jeong) chicken. This concerns everyone until he reveals that Chang is giving them higher Spanish grades in return, at which point the group (except for Jeff) enthusiastically supports the deal.

Under Abed, the group works out a system to redistribute the skimmed chicken. Abed begins to use favors from other students to provide spoils to the rest of the study group. Irritated by this, Jeff attempts to talk to the group, but he realizes they no longer listen to him, as Abed has been providing the study group with things that they enjoy, using his newfound power. He leaves to find Abed taking more requests for chicken from other students. Jeff argues the ploy has gone on long enough, but Abed counters by arguing Jeff misses the control he once had. Jeff then tries to convince the rest of the group to stop following Abed. When they refuse to listen, he threatens to leave, but nobody stops him.

The next day, Jeff is approached by Star-Burns. He gives Jeff a key to the kitchen and tells him there is a valve on the fryer that if removed, would break the fryer permanently. Jeff reluctantly takes the key. Abed notices that the remaining members of the study group are growing greedier and pettier from their spoils, so he sends the group a message by taking away or ruining the things he had given them, including letting Troy's monkey, named "Annie's Boobs," out of his cage. Panicked, they track down Jeff, who accepts their apology after pointing out he was right about what would happen. He agrees to help stop Abed.

That evening, Jeff sneaks into the kitchen, where he finds Abed frying new foods. Abed explains that people grew tired of chicken but that he'll find something new to replace it. Jeff realizes that skimming and giving out chicken had helped Abed connect to others. Ashamed, he admits to Abed that he had planned to sabotage the fryer and had indeed just been jealous about losing control. Jeff agrees to help Abed connect with people in return for Abed helping Jeff treat them better. Abed quits as fry cook, and things return to normal for the study group.

== Production ==
The episode was written by Emily Cutler and Karey Dornetto; it is Cutler's first and Dornetto's second writing credit for the show. It was directed by Tristram Shapeero in his first directing credit for the show.

== Cultural references ==
As a whole, the episode is an homage to Goodfellas, with Abed's narration of the study group's story mirroring Henry Hill telling the story of the Lucchese crime family's rise and fall. Several moments in the episode, such as the usage of "Layla" and the inclusion of freeze frames, are references to specific scenes in the movie. The chicken has been seen as a stand-in for either the cocaine or the cigarettes, liquor, and other drugs dealt in the film.

Abed remarks that Shirley's attempts to attract a man remind him of the Predator. A newspaper heading in one scene reads "Star-Gate", with clarification underneath that the reference is to the Watergate scandal, not the 1994 film Stargate. Shirley cites Tyler Perry's films when arguing why Abed needs to be stopped. Toward the middle of the episode, Pierce kisses Abed’s hand and Jeff glares and Troy closes the door, mirroring the final scene of The Godfather. Near the end of the episode, Abed and Jeff recreate a scene from Sixteen Candles by dining on a table. The episode also references the concept of a "very special episode".

== Reception ==
=== Ratings ===
In its original broadcast, "Contemporary American Poultry" was watched by approximately 3.67 million Americans and achieved a 1.6/5 in the 18-49 demographic.

=== Reviews ===
Critics were mostly positive towards the episode. Emily VanDerWerff of The A.V. Club gave the episode an A−, calling it "an elaborate Goodfellas parody, executed with panache" and praising the show for how "it manages to find a way to balance all of this with character moments that are genuinely winning and sweet." Andy Greenwald of Vulture also praised the episode, deeming it "the best half-hour of the series to date, featuring zingers that zinged, pop-culture riffs that popped, and a tiny monkey in a cage named 'Annie's Boobs'." Jonah Krakow of IGN called it "a solid episode" and appreciated many of the gags but thought "the last third of the episode felt a bit heavy-handed as Abed learned his own life lesson." He ultimately gave the episode an 8 out of 10, denoting a "great" episode. Sean Gandert of Paste gave the episode a 7.3, noting that "the show is doing something more than just taking laughs off of references, that the jokes stand on themselves and are only enhanced by knowledge of their sources." However, he felt "disappointed by the ending" and thought the interaction between Jeff and Abed was unnatural.

In a ranking of the best episodes of the series, EW.com placed the episode fifteenth, noting that "One of Community's first full-blown concept episodes is one of its best." A separate ranking of all 110 episodes by TV.com placed the episode ninth; it is the second-highest episode on the list from season 1, behind "Modern Warfare".
