= The Politics of Human Sexuality =

- Community episode
- Episode no.: Season 1 Episode 11
- Directed by: Anthony Russo
- Written by: Hillary Winston
- Production code: 110
- Original air date: December 3, 2009

Guest appearances
- Sharon Lawrence as Doreen; Jim Rash as Dean Craig Pelton; Craig Cackowski as Officer Cackowski; Sara Erikson as Sabrina

Episode chronology
← Previous "Environmental Science"	Next → "Comparative Religion"
- Community season 1

"The Politics of Human Sexuality" is the eleventh episode of the first season of the American comedy television series Community. It originally aired in the United States on NBC on December 3, 2009.

Dean Pelton and Annie host an STD awareness fair at Greendale as Troy and Abed compete against each other to see who is the better athlete.

== Plot ==
Dean Pelton (Jim Rash) and Annie (Alison Brie) are promoting Greendale's upcoming STD fair, handing out fortune cookies and flyers. Troy (Donald Glover) is handed a flyer, but misses the trash can when throwing it away. Abed (Danny Pudi) does the same but makes the shot. Fearing Abed is better at sports, Troy challenges him to prove who is the better athlete.

Pierce (Chevy Chase) asks Jeff to double date with him and his new girlfriend Doreen (Sharon Lawrence), an escort, to the fair later that night. Pierce taunts Jeff that he can't get a date in time. Irritated, Jeff accepts his challenge. He calls a few women asking them accompany him on the date, but is brutally rebuffed. When Britta looks through his phone and finds no names but descriptions such as "Hot Blonde Spanish Class" as contacts, she suggests his shallow approach to dating is perhaps why he can't find a date.

Dean Pelton decides that Annie should conduct a condom demonstration on an anatomically correct model of a penis center stage at the fair. Annie panics, having never seen an actual penis in her life. Worried she'll mess up the demonstration, she asks Britta and Shirley (Yvette Nicole Brown) for help. Annie admits to not being a virgin but realizes with Britta and Shirley's help that her ex-boyfriend was gay. Annie suggests they break into the Dean's office to get the actual model to practice with; Britta and Shirley agree.

At the fair, Pierce tries to comfort Jeff, reassuring him that in his experience, dry spells with women only last 12 to 13 years. Jeff immediately turns his focus to Sabrina (Sara Erikson), the Dean's shallow new assistant, and asks the Dean for information about her. Annie, Shirley, and Britta try to break into the Dean's office, but as they look at the model penis through the keyhole, campus security walk in and detain the three. They are brought to Dean Pelton and the school counselor to discuss the incident; Annie accepts that she prefers being uncomfortable talking about sexuality.

During the double date, Doreen tells Jeff that he could do a lot better than Sabrina and that as men become older, they prefer conversational companionship over sex. Jeff leaves with Sabrina anyway. Doreen tells Pierce that if he wants to continue to hang out for the night it will cost him $200. Meanwhile, Abed easily beats Troy at basketball, a carnival game, and arm wrestling. When the two race across campus, Abed lets Troy win.

Back inside the fair, Dean Pelton observes that the alcohol served has caused many of the students to be highly sexually aroused. When students decide to make water balloons, they discover holes from the text printed on the condoms. Panicking, the Dean asks Troy to run to his office to make an announcement not to use the distributed condoms. Troy, however, bestows the responsibility to Abed, the faster of the two. Abed mistakenly warns students not to use condoms at all.

While having sex inside Jeff's car, Sabrina reveals that she thought he was a professor, and Jeff realizes he must be more mature in his romantic endeavors. Jeff ends things with Sabrina and returns to the fair to chat with Pierce. Jeff privately changes "Hot Blonde Spanish Class" to "Britta" in his phone.

== Reception ==
In its original U.S. broadcast it was viewed by 5.42 million.

Emily VanDerWerff of The A.V. Club rated the episode positively with a B+ and that it was "another fine and funny episode of a show that's rapidly turned into one of my favorites."

Sean Gandert of Paste noted the struggle of trying to fit 40 minutes of ideas into 22 minutes and that "The strange level of Orwellian doublespeak and strange standards are a magically weird affair and Community captured the essence of just how odd these things really are. That being said, I wanted more of it."

Jonah Krakow of IGN was negative and not hopeful on the quality of future episodes, stating, "[...] nor was this the worst episode in the history of television. But I'm done making excuses or holding out hope that it will eventually improve."
