= Sara Erikson =

21st-century American actress

- Occupation: Actress
- Years active: 2004–present
- Spouse: Peter Oldring (m. 2010)

Sara Erikson is an American television and film actress.

== Career ==
Erikson is known for her recurring role as Robyn Marquette, Vince's scheming ex-girlfriend and co-worker in What I Like About You, and various characters in the Jeff Foxworthy series Foxworthy's Big Night Out. Her first feature film role was in Mexican Werewolf in Texas in 2005. After a series of television roles, she received her second feature film role in 2008 in the Bernie Mac / Samuel L. Jackson film Soul Men.

She made two guest appearances on the long-running sitcom Two and a Half Men, portraying two different characters. The most notable is the second appearance in which she is featured as the much older love interest (and eventual sexual conquest) of teenaged Jake Harper (Angus T. Jones).

== Personal life ==
Erikson has been married to Canadian actor and comedian Peter Oldring since March 2010.

== Filmography ==
- Good Girls Don't (1 episode, 2004) (TV)
- Mexican Werewolf in Texas (2005)
- What I Like About You (5 episodes, 2005–2006) (TV)
- Hooked (2006)
- Boston Legal (Kate, 1 episode, 2006) (TV)
- It's Always Sunny in Philadelphia (1 episode, 2006) (TV)
- After Midnight: Life Behind Bars (2006) (TV)
- Foxworthy's Big Night Out (9 episodes, 2006) (TV)[7]
- I'm in Hell (2007) (TV)
- Day Break (1 episode, 2007) (TV)
- In Case of Emergency (2 episodes, 2007) (TV)
- Two and a Half Men (1 episode, 2007) (TV)
- Slice (2007)
- Hannah Montana (1 episode, 2007) (TV)
- Expecting Love (2008)
- Soul Men (2008)
- Community (Episode, "The Politics of Human Sexuality", 2009) (TV)
- Not Evelyn Cho (2009)
- Acts of Mercy (2009)
- The Suite Life on Deck (1 episode, 2009) (TV)
- Larry the Cable Guy's Hula-Palooza Christmas Luau (2009) (TV)
- Love That Girl! (1 Episode, "The Delroy Indemnity", 2013) (TV)
- Two and a Half Men (1 episode, 2012) (TV)
- Princess Rap Battle (1 episode, 2014)
- The Big Bang Theory (1 episode, 2015) (TV)
- Awkward. (1 episode, 2015)
