= Trīdeksnis =

Latvian percussion instrument

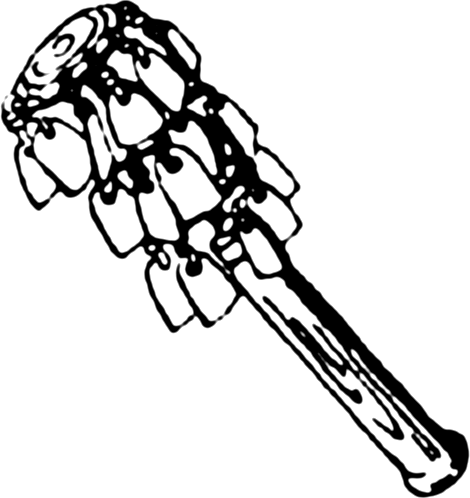
- A 1850 trīdeksnis from Apriķi, Kurzeme

Percussion instrument
- Other names: Trīdeksnis, trejdeksnis, trīdēkslis, trīdēksnis, strīdēkslis, trīzdeksnis, strīzdeklis, strīzdiķis, ztrīzdiķis, trideksnis, tridēksnis, trijdeksnis, trumulis, trumulītis, trumuls, trumele, trumelis, trumēliņš, čakans, čokans, čokens, čakārnis, čagana
- Classification: Percussion instrument, idiophone
- Hornbostel–Sachs classification: 112.112 (Stick rattle)
- Inventor: Folk instrument

Trīdeksnis (also known as trejdeksnis, trīdēkslis, trīdēksnis, strīdēkslis etc.) is a Latvian percussion instrument. It consists of a short wooden handle running through three increasing width tiers of flat horizontal discs, with small triangular metal rattles hanging off the edges of the disks. The trīdeksnis is used by shaking it like a rattle or hitting the handle against the palm, causing metal discs to jingle.

In the NBC series Community, the trīdeksnis is played during a Latvian independence day parade inside a blanket fort in the episode "Conspiracy Theories and Interior Design".
