= Interpretive Dance (Community) =

- Community episode
- Episode no.: Season 1 Episode 14
- Directed by: Justin Lin
- Written by: Lauren Pomerantz
- Production code: 112
- Original air date: January 21, 2010

Guest appearances
- Jim Rash as Dean Craig Pelton; Lauren Stamile as Professor Michelle Slater; Twink Caplan as Madam LeClair

Episode chronology
← Previous "Investigative Journalism"	Next → "Romantic Expressionism"
- Community season 1

"Interpretive Dance" is the fourteenth episode of the first season of the American comedy television series Community. It aired in the United States on NBC on January 21, 2010. It focuses on secrets that members of the study group are keeping from each other.

== Plot ==
The study group discusses moving their meeting time to avoid issues with the back door of the library being locked after 5 pm, but both Troy (Donald Glover) and Britta (Gillian Jacobs) say that they have a commitment that precludes meeting earlier. When Jeff (Joel McHale) arrives, Britta notices numerous similar long hairs on his coat, revealing that Jeff has been seeing the same woman more than once, counter to Jeff's usual one-night stands. Jeff remains quiet on the identity of this woman.

The woman Jeff has been seeing is revealed to be Professor Michelle Slater (Lauren Stamile); while fraternizing in her office, they are nearly caught in the act by Dean Pelton (Jim Rash) but are able to play him off. Jeff later introduces Michelle to the study group but asks them to keep his relationship a secret, which is already too late as Pierce (Chevy Chase) has sent out a tweet about it. Pelton calls them into his office and makes them sign a form regarding their fraternization. However, when it comes to describing their relationship, Jeff is hesitant to call Michelle his girlfriend, leaving Michelle bitter. Jeff goes to see Michelle in her office, apologizing for his fear of commitment. When he promises to consider their relationship more seriously, Michelle accepts the apology and locks her office to allow them privacy.

Meanwhile, Troy and Britta have discovered they are in two different dance classes; Troy in modern dance while Britta is following her dream to learn tap dance. Both classes are scheduled to have a recital soon; Britta is excited to be able to invite the study group, but Troy remains quiet. Rather than reveal his secret, Troy opts to quit his dance class, leaving Britta disappointed, though Shirley (Yvette Nicole Brown) believes that Britta is disappointed over Jeff's new romance.

The dance recital begins with a large audience, including Jeff and Michelle. Britta's routine with her classmates is a simple routine set to the melody of "Tea for Two," with her posing as a watering can watering "flowers," her fellow dancers. When Britta sees Jeff holding Michelle's hand in the audience, she freezes up. Troy, walking by, sees Britta's predicament and races in, tearing off his clothes to reveal a dance unitard. He takes the stage and helps Britta finish her routine, then begins an improvised modern dance with her leaving the audience entranced.

After the performance, Britta thanks Troy for his help, though Troy admits it was simply the only masculine option for him. Jeff gives Britta flowers for her performance, while she congratulates Jeff on being mature enough to have a relationship.

== Production ==
"Interpretive Dance" was the second episode directed by Justin Lin and the second written by Lauren Pomerantz. It was the second of five episodes in which Lauren Stamile appears as Professor Michelle Slater.

== Reception ==
Around 4.73 million Americans watched "Interpretive Dance".

Emily VanDerWerff of The A.V. Club rated the episode B, calling it "pretty good" but wishing that the entire cast was together more rather than focusing on individual story lines. She also suggested that the dance scene that concludes the episode was unoriginal. TV Fanatic's Matt Richenthal enjoyed the show and speculated as to whether Jeff's growing maturity would make him more or less funny, and whether he and Britta would end up in a relationship.
