= Abed Nadir =

Fictional character in Community

- Community character
- First appearance: "Pilot" (2009)
- Created by: Dan Harmon
- Portrayed by: Danny Pudi

In-universe information
- Full name: Abed Gobi Nadir
- Nicknames: Batman; Henry David Thoreau Diet Squirt; Brown Jamie Lee Curtis; Inspector Spacetime; Fourth Wall
- Occupation: Student at Greendale Community College (formerly); Production assistant
- Affiliation: Greendale Community College
- Family: Gobi Nadir (father); Abra Nadir (cousin)
- Significant others: Rachel (girlfriend)
- Religion: Islam (main, observes some Christian traditions such as Christmas)
- Origin: Polish-Palestinian
- Nationality: American

Abed Gubi Nadir is a fictional character and one of the central protagonists on the American television sitcom Community (2009–2015). He is portrayed by Danny Pudi and created by series showrunner Dan Harmon.

Abed is a student at Greendale Community College and one of the first members of the show's central study group. A pop culture enthusiast, his extensive knowledge of TV shows and movies, as well as his passion for filmmaking, often lead the study group to reference or attempt to recreate famous media properties. Abed serves as the main link between Community and the real world, often pointing out motifs and tropes present within the show's events.

Abed's unusual social behavior and special interests imply that he is on the autism spectrum, as suggested by Harmon and stated by other characters on the show. Despite what some perceive as a lack of social skills, he is generally beloved by members of the study group and enjoys a close bond with Troy Barnes (Donald Glover).

== Concept and development ==
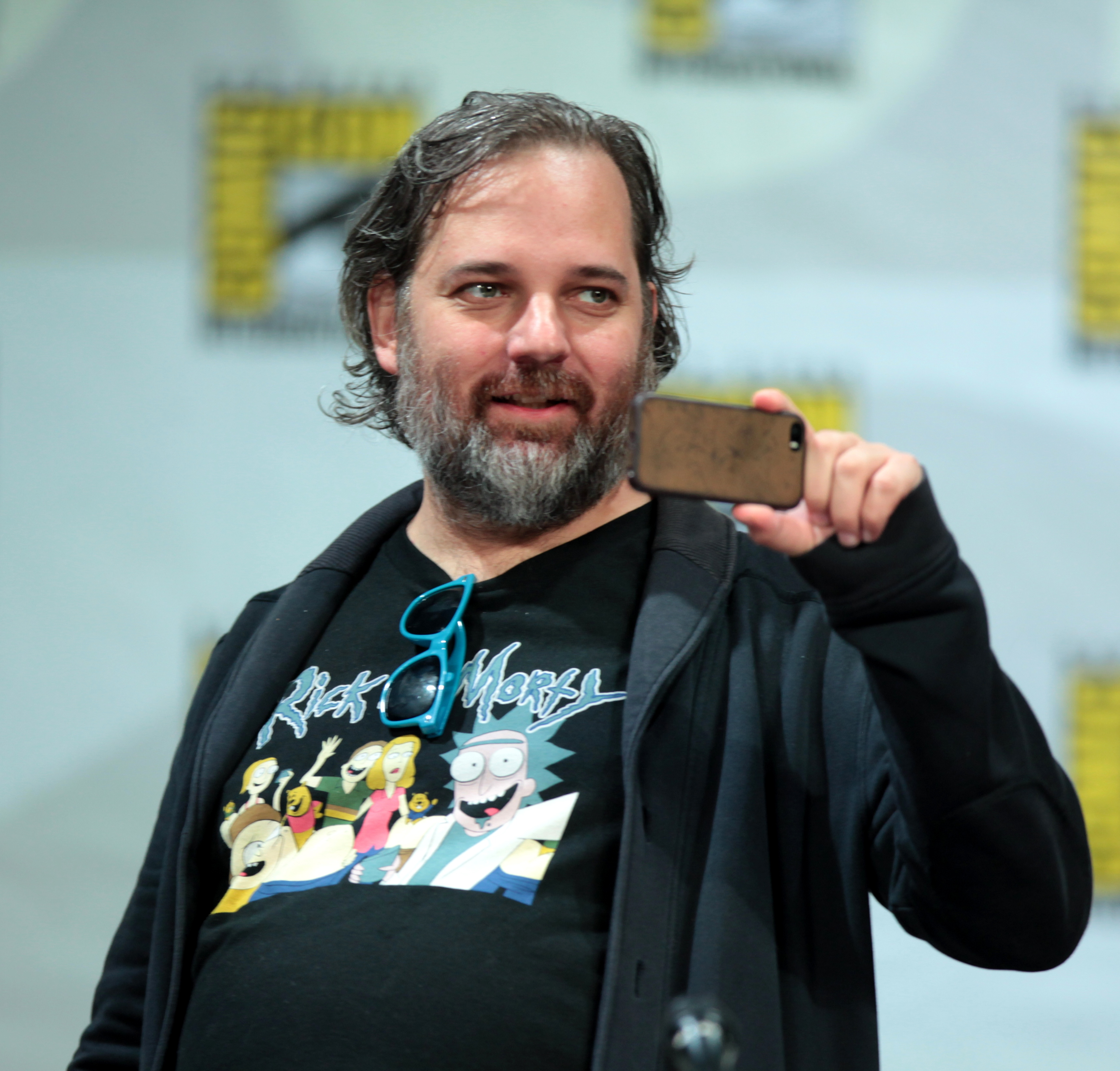
Dan Harmon based the character of Abed on himself, resulting in Abed displaying autistic traits (referred to in the show as Asperger's)

Abed was based on a real-life friend of Community creator Dan Harmon named Abed Gheith, a Palestinian American pop-culture nerd who unsuccessfully auditioned for the role. After consulting a doctor about it, Harmon concluded that both he and the character of Abed are on the spectrum. While on a podcast hosted by Kevin Pollak, Harmon said:

I know I'm not normal, but I think the important thing is that [...] I started to discover that I had a lot more in common with Abed than I did with Jeff.

Originally intended to be solely Palestinian, the character was made half-Polish when Pudi, who is half-Polish and half-Indian, was cast. Pudi, who auditioned for the role four times, was one of the two finalists for the role along with Kumail Nanjiani.

On February 3, 2023, Pudi and Alison Brie confirmed that they would both return for the Community movie.

== Character biography ==
=== Background ===
Abed Gubi Nadir was born to a Palestinian Muslim father from Gaza and a Polish American Catholic mother. His mother left his family when he was six years old, which Abed assumes his father blames him for. After his mother left, Abed submerged himself in American pop culture, resulting in his extensive knowledge of film and television.

Abed's father permits him to take classes at Greendale so that Abed can help take over the family's falafel restaurant one day. Abed later convinces his father to allow him to study film instead.

=== Personality and behavior ===
Abed's defining trait is his pop culture knowledge, resulting in his frequent references to film and television. Though seemingly lacking social skills to the extent that other characters suspect he is autistic, Abed is able to expertly morph his personality to reflect fictional characters such as Batman, Don Draper, and Han Solo.

His encyclopedic knowledge of pop culture makes him highly observant and analytical, such that he is able to predict what fellow members of the study group will say and do (as shown in "Debate 109"). In "Aerodynamics of Gender", Abed uses these skills to fend off a group of mean girls; encouraged by Britta, Shirley, and Annie, he adopts a RoboCop-like ability to point out exactly what women on campus are insecure about.

Abed is the primary source of the show's meta-references: he warns the study group in "Cooperative Calligraphy" that their argument will lead to a bottle episode, is the only member of the group to notice that they are being portrayed via stop motion animation in "Abed's Uncontrollable Christmas", and occasionally breaks the fourth wall.

=== Interests and hobbies ===
Abed's passion for filmmaking often leads him to recreate or pay homage to his favorite films. In the season 1 episode "Contemporary American Poultry", Abed contextualizes the study group's efforts to own the campus cafeteria's chicken finger supply within the scope of a mafia movie, and narrates the episode in the style of Henry Hill from Goodfellas. In "Critical Film Studies", he invites Jeff to a dinner under the guise of having a "real conversation" free from pop culture references, when in reality the dinner itself is Abed's attempt to reenact My Dinner with Andre.

Abed also regularly takes the opportunity to turn events into documentaries, such as in "Intermediate Documentary Filmmaking" where Pierce's near-death experience becomes the basis of a documentary. In the season 3 episode "Documentary Filmmaking: Redux", he attempts to recreate Hearts of Darkness: A Filmmaker's Apocalypse while capturing Dean Pelton's efforts to film a new commercial for Greendale.

Aside from his own projects, Abed shows interest in several media franchises: the fictional British sci-fi show Inspector Spacetime (which is a parody of Doctor Who), the short-lived superhero drama The Cape, and Cougar Town. The show's references to Cougar Town resulted in Pudi making a cameo appearance on the season 2 episode "Something Good Coming, Part 1".

In the series finale "Emotional Consequences of Broadcast Television", Abed reveals he is moving to Los Angeles to work as a production assistant for a TV show.

=== Relationships with others ===
Abed's struggling social skills often frustrate other members of the cast, though the study group is generally accepting of him and comes to embrace his personality. Some of his less favorable actions include tracking the female members of the groups' menstrual cycles (a habit which he insists began accidentally) and installing tracking devices onto all members of the study group.

Abed forms a close friendship with Troy; their relationship is characterized by their joint willingness to engage in hijinks, such as building a campus-wide blanket fort and hosting a mock morning news program titled Troy and Abed in the Morning. The two move in together in season 3, and later invite Annie to join them in their apartment. The bounds of Troy and Abed's friendship are most notably explored in the season 3 episode "Pillows and Blankets", in which their conflicting philosophies regarding blanket forts results in a campus war, as well as in Troy's final episode "Geothermal Escapism", in which Abed must come to terms with Troy's departure from Greendale.

In the season 4 episode "Herstory of Dance", Abed meets and develops feelings for a coat check girl named Rachel (Brie Larson). They date during season 5, though after the season's 9th episode, Rachel never appears again. Abed references her sudden disappearance in the season 6 episode "Ladders", remarking, "What happened to that girl I was dating?"

== Reception ==
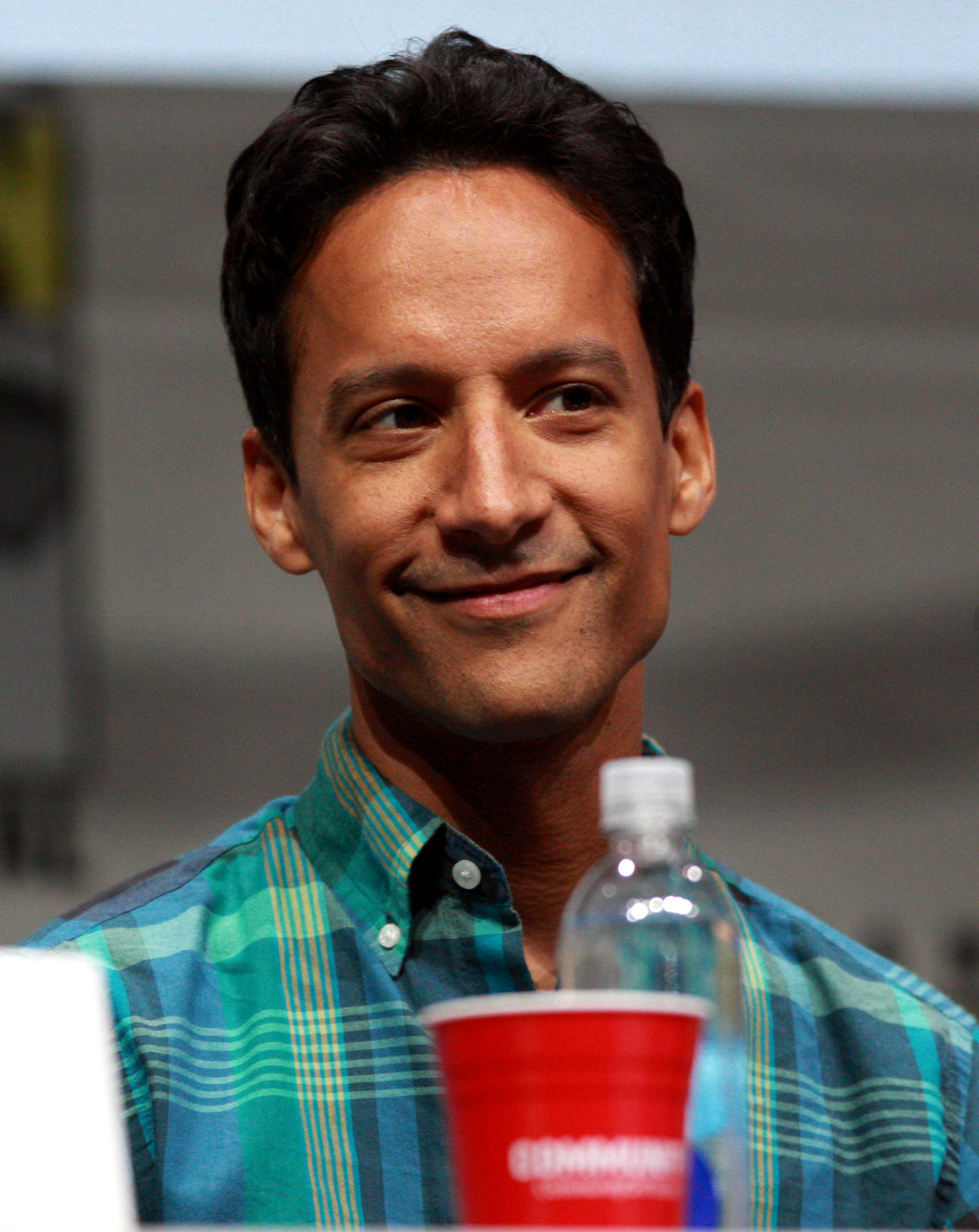
Danny Pudi portrays the character

=== Critical response ===
The character of Abed Nadir has received acclaim from critics and viewers. In 2011, Paste ranked him at first in their list of the 20 Best TV Characters of 2011, describing him as "the show's emotional center" and saying "his pop-culture obsessions and antics with his buddy Troy have made for some of the show's finest moments." Emily VanDerWerff, who served as TV editor for The A.V. Club when Community originally aired, called Abed one of the most original characters of the decade and praised the show for finding "a different way to do a sitcom character."

The phrase "Six Seasons and a Movie", yelled by Abed when Jeff argues that The Cape will be canceled, became a rallying cry for the Community fanbase when the show was on the verge of being canceled itself.

Though the show never confirms if Abed is autistic, many critics have praised the show for its portrayal of Abed within that context and for allowing Abed to establish relationships and undergo character development nonetheless. His portrayal has been well-received by many autistic viewers.

=== Awards and nominations ===
For his portrayal of Abed, Pudi has been nominated for several awards, including three Critics' Choice Television Awards for Best Supporting Actor in a Comedy Series, one TCA Award for Individual Achievement in Comedy, and three EWwy Awards for Best Supporting Actor in a Comedy (winning one in 2012).
