= Comparative Religion (Community) =

- Community episode
- Episode no.: Season 1 Episode 12
- Directed by: Adam Davidson
- Written by: Liz Cackowski
- Production code: 111
- Original air date: December 10, 2009

Guest appearances
- Jim Rash as Dean Craig Pelton; Anthony Michael Hall as Mike

Episode chronology
← Previous "The Politics of Human Sexuality"	Next → "Investigative Journalism"
- Community season 1

"Comparative Religion" is the twelfth episode of the first season of the American comedy television series Community. It aired in the United States on NBC on December 10, 2009.

== Plot ==
Shirley (Yvette Nicole Brown) plans a Christmas party for the study group, hoping to celebrate in her Christian ways, but learns everyone else is from a different religious background: Annie (Alison Brie) is Jewish, Abed (Danny Pudi) is Muslim, Troy (Donald Glover) is a Jehovah's Witness, Britta (Gillian Jacobs) is an atheist, Pierce (Chevy Chase) is in a cult but believes that it is a Buddhist community, while Jeff (Joel McHale) is agnostic.

Meanwhile, Jeff stands up to a bully named Mike (Anthony Michael Hall) who harasses Abed in the cafeteria. They agree to meet in a parking lot to fight. Shirley refuses to support Jeff because she is against violence, but the rest of the group helps Jeff get ready to fight Mike. Shirley tells Jeff that if he participates in the fight, he cannot come to her Christmas party. During the party, the group all decide to leave to support Jeff at the fight, and eventually even Shirley leaves to support Jeff. They all come to Jeff's defense when they fight Mike and his friends on the college campus. After they finish the fight bloodied and bruised but triumphant, the group celebrate the holidays and learn they all passed their Spanish final, meaning they will all move on to Spanish 102.

In the end tag, Abed piles Christmas decorations on Troy while singing "O Christmas Tree" with the lyrics "O Christmas Troy." Jeff walks in and asks why they do things like this, to which Troy replies that it's fun, so Jeff joins them.

== Reception ==
Around 5.505 million Americans watched "Comparative Religion".

Emily VanDerWerff of The A.V. Club rated the episode A, calling it "one of my favorite episodes of the show so far."
