= Study group =

Small group of people who meet regularly to discuss work

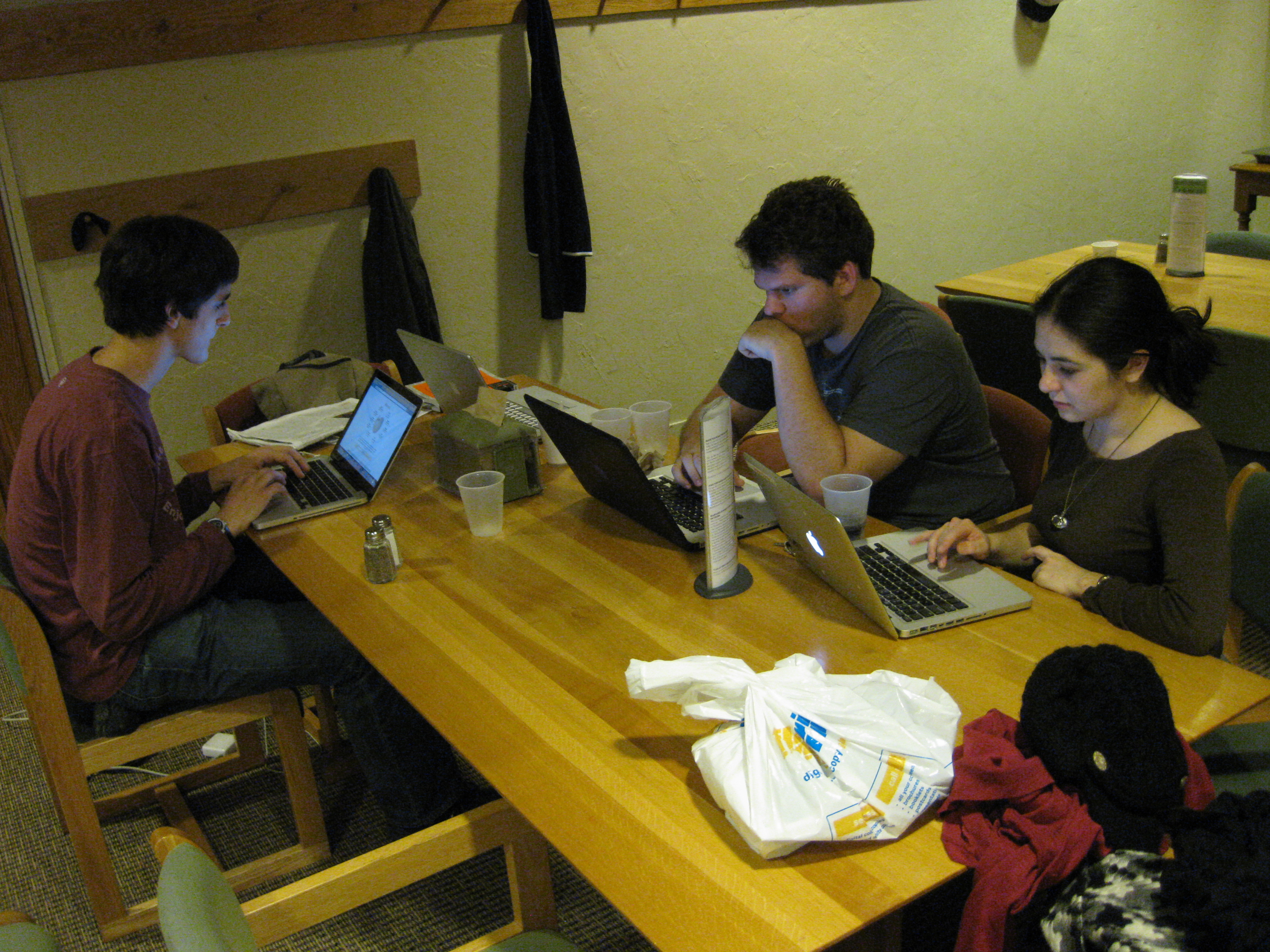
A group of students study in Currier House's dining hall

A study group is a small group of people who regularly meet to discuss shared fields of study. These groups can be found in a high school or college/university setting, within companies, occasionally primary/junior school and sometimes middle school. Professional advancement organizations also may encourage study groups. Study groups have helped students who have trouble being in a large group setting.

Each group is unique and draws on the backgrounds and abilities of its members to determine the material that will be covered. Often, a leader who is not actively studying the material will direct group activities. Some colleges actively set up study group programs for students to sign up.

Typical college level academic groups include 5-20 students and an administrator or tutor drawn from the graduate program or a senior student or a faculty. Professional groups are often smaller.

When students study in groups, they can motivate and encourage each other and lessen procrastination. Also, students are able to learn some studying skills and habits by observing others' study skills and they can incorporate it in their studying routine. Teaching concepts and information to others can help be more familiar and master those concepts. In addition, some students might be uncomfortable asking a question in class and they might feel more comfortable asking someone in a small group. It can create a more fun and positive experience for students.
