= Adam Davidson (director) =

American actor and television director

- Born: August 13, 1964 (age 62); Los Angeles, California, United States
- Occupations: Television director, film director, actor
- Years active: 1989–present
- Father: Gordon Davidson

Adam Davidson (born August 13, 1964) is an American actor and television director from Los Angeles, California.

== Life and career ==
Davidson graduated from Kenyon College in 1986. and from Columbia University School of the Arts in 1994. Davidson has appeared in the following films, The Day Trippers, A Match Made in Heaven, Návrat ztraceného ráje (a.k.a. Return to Paradise Lost), Way Past Cool, Nature Boy and Pop Life. In addition to acting, Davidson has also directed for several television programs which include: Community, Lost, Deadwood, Grey's Anatomy, Six Feet Under and Fringe. He is the son of acclaimed Jewish American theatre producer and director Gordon Davidson.

== Accolades ==
His debut film as a director, The Lunch Date, won the Academy Award for Best Short Subject and the Short Film Palme d'Or at the 1990 Cannes Film Festival.

== Director filmography ==
- NCIS: Origins (3 episodes, 2026)
  - 1.01 "Pilot"
  - 1.06 "My Companion"
  - 1.09 "TBA"
- I Will Find You (2 episodes, 2026)
- Bosch: Legacy (3 episodes, 2022-2024)
  - 1.10 "Always/All Ways"
  - 3.06 "Broken Order"
  - 3.09 "Badlands"
- La Brea (6 episodes, 2021-2023)
  - 1.03 "The Hunt"
  - 1.06 "The Way Home"
  - 1.10 "Topanga"
  - 2.01 "The Next Day"
  - 2.02 "The Cave"
  - 2.06 "Lazarus"
  - 2.14 "The Journey, Part 2"
- Ordinary Joe (1 episode, 2021)
  - 1.01 "Way Leads on to Way"
- Zoey's Extraordinary Playlist (4 episodes, 2020)
  - 1.02 "Zoey's Extraordinary Best Friend"
  - 1.04 "Zoey's Extraordinary Neighbor"
  - 1.11 "Zoey's Extraordinary Mother"
  - 1.12 "Zoey's Extraordinary Dad"
- AJ and the Queen (2020) - episode #4: "Louisville"
- Bluff City Law (2019) - episode #2: "You Don't Need a Weatherman"
- Tell Me a Story (2018) - episode #9 "Chapter 9: Deception"
- Splitting Up Together (2018) - episode #12 "War of the Wagners"
- The Rookie (2018) - episode #2 "Crash Course"
- Wisdom of the Crowd (4 episodes, 2017)
  - 1.01 - "Pilot"
  - 1.02 - "Into The Wild"
  - 1.07 - "Trade Secrets"
  - 1.11 - "Alpha Test"
- I'm Dying Up Here (6 episodes, 2017-2018)
  - 1.07 "My Rifle, My Pony & Me"
  - 1.10 "Creative Differences"
  - 2.01 "Gone with The Wind"
  - 2.02 "Plus One"
  - 2.05 "Heroes and Villains"
  - 2.10 "Lines Crossed"
- Fear The Walking Dead (5 episodes, 2015-2016)
  - 1.01 - "Pilot"
  - 1.02 - "So Close, Yet So Far"
  - 1.03 - "The Dog"
  - 2.01 - "Monster"
  - 2.02 - We All Fall Down"
- Kingdom (2014-2017) TV series
  - episode 1.01 "Set Yourself on Fire"
  - episode 1.02 "Glass Eye"
  - episode 3.05 "Please Give"
  - episode 3.06 "All Talk"
- Turn: Washington's Spies (2014) TV series
  - episode 1.04 "Eternity How Long"
- Rake (2014) TV series
  - episode 1.06 "Jury Tamperer"
- Treme (2011) TV series
  - episode 2.09 "What is New Orleans?"
- Fringe (2010) TV series
  - episode 2.14 "The Bishop Revival"
- United States of Tara (2010) TV Series
  - episode "The Truth Hurts"
  - episode "You Becoming You"
- Big Love (3 episodes, 2007–2010)
  - Strange Bedfellows (2010) TV episode
  - Fight or Flight (2009) TV episode
  - Rock and a Hard Place (2007) TV episode
- Community (4 episodes, 2009–2015)
  - Wedding Videography (2015) TV episode
  - Conspiracy Theories and Interior Design (2010) TV episode
  - The Art of Discourse (2010) TV episode
  - Communication Studies (2010) TV episode
  - Comparative Religion (2009) TV episode
- True Blood (1 episode, 2009)
  - New World in My View (2009) TV episode
- Lie to Me (3 episodes, 2009)
  - Sacrifice (2009) TV episode
  - Depraved Heart (2009) TV episode
  - Moral Waiver (2009) TV episode
- Kings (1 episode, 2009)
  - Insurrection (2009) TV episode
- The Ex List (1 episode, 2008)
  - Climb Every Mountain Biker (2008) TV episode
- Saving Grace (1 episode, 2008)
  - A Little Hometown Love (2008) TV episode
- Shark (6 episodes, 2007–2008)
  - Wayne's World 3: Killer Shark (2008) TV episode
  - Bar Fight (2008) TV episode
  - In Absentia (2007) TV episode
  - Gangster Movies (2007) TV episode
  - Wayne's World 2: Revenge of the Shark (2007) TV episode
  - Starlet Fever (2007) TV episode
- John from Cincinnati (1 episode, 2007)
  - His Visit: Day Eight (2007) TV episode
- Dexter (1 episode, 2006)
  - Father Knows Best (2006) TV episode
- Rome (2005) TV Series
  - episode 2.04 "Testudo et Lepus"
- For Norman... Wherever You Are (2005)
- Grey's Anatomy (2005) TV Series
  - episode 1.04 "No Mans Land"
  - episode 2.03 "Make Me Lose Control"
  - episode 2.07 "Something to Talk About"
  - episode 2.14 "Tell Me Sweet Little Lies"
- Life As We Know It (2004) TV Series
- Deadwood (2004) TV series
  - episode 3.09 "Amateur Night"
- Lost (2005) TV Series
  - episode 2.06 Abandoned
- LAX (2004) TV Series
  - episode "Credible Threat"
  - episode "Out of Control"
- Jake 2.0 (2003) TV Series
- Monk (2002) TV Series
- The Agency (2001) TV Series
- The Chronicle" (2001) TV Series
  - episode "Man and Superman"
  - episode "Only the Good Die Young"
  - episode "Tears of a Clone"
  - episode "What Gobbles Beneath"
- Six Feet Under (2001) TV Series
  - episode 5.10 "All Alone"
- The Invisible Man (2000) TV Series
  - episode 2.18 "The Invisible Woman"
- Cover Me: Based on the True Life of an FBI Family (2000) TV Series
- Way Past Cool (2000)
- Law & Order (1990) TV Series
  - episode 8.11 "Under the Influence"
- The Lunch Date (1989)
