= Jeff Winger =

Fictional character in Community

- Community character
- Joel McHale as Jeff Winger
- First appearance: "Pilot" (2009)
- Created by: Dan Harmon
- Portrayed by: Joel McHale

In-universe information
- Gender: Male
- Occupation: Law professor Lawyer (formerly)
- Nationality: American

Jeffrey Tobias Winger is a fictional character and the main protagonist of the American television sitcom Community (2009–2015). He is portrayed by Joel McHale and was created by showrunner Dan Harmon, who modeled the character after himself.

Jeff is a fast-talking, solipsistic narcissist who worked as a lawyer until he was disbarred for faking his college degree. He enrolled at Greendale Community College to get his license to practice back, where he joined a study group that would go on many absurd misadventures and ultimately make him a better person.

== Role in Community ==
Jeff Winger is the son of William and Doreen Winger. Jeff attended Greendale Community College as a student, until graduating in "Advanced Introduction to Finality". In the following episode, "Repilot", Jeff is offered a job as a teacher at Greendale by Dean Craig Pelton, an offer he accepts. Prior to serving as a teacher, Jeff served as a criminal defense lawyer for a major law firm. During his tenure, Jeff landed multiple cases for the firm, attracting the attention of Alan Connor, who discovered that Jeff's degree was illegitimate, and sent an incriminating email to the Colorado Bar Association. Jeff, in turn, made a deal with the bar to prevent him from getting disbarred, on the condition that he would earn a degree from an accredited institution, ultimately deciding to attend Greendale.

Jeff's exact age has changed multiple times, and is unknown. In "Early 21st Century Romanticism" (season two, 2011), Jeff's driver's license lists his birthday as November 20, 1971, making him 40 years old at the time of the episode's airing. This was later clarified as a mistake by the props department, who used Joel McHale's birthday in place of Jeff's. In "Intro to Political Science" (season two, 2011), Annie Edison plays a clip of Jeff's audition tape for MTV's The Real World: Seattle, with the clip dated to 1997 and Jeff estimated to be 19 at the time of the tape, placing him in the age range of 32–33 at the time of the episode's airing. This was retconned in "G.I. Jeff" (season five, 2014), when Jeff suffers a mental breakdown upon turning 40.

== Character ==
=== Creation ===
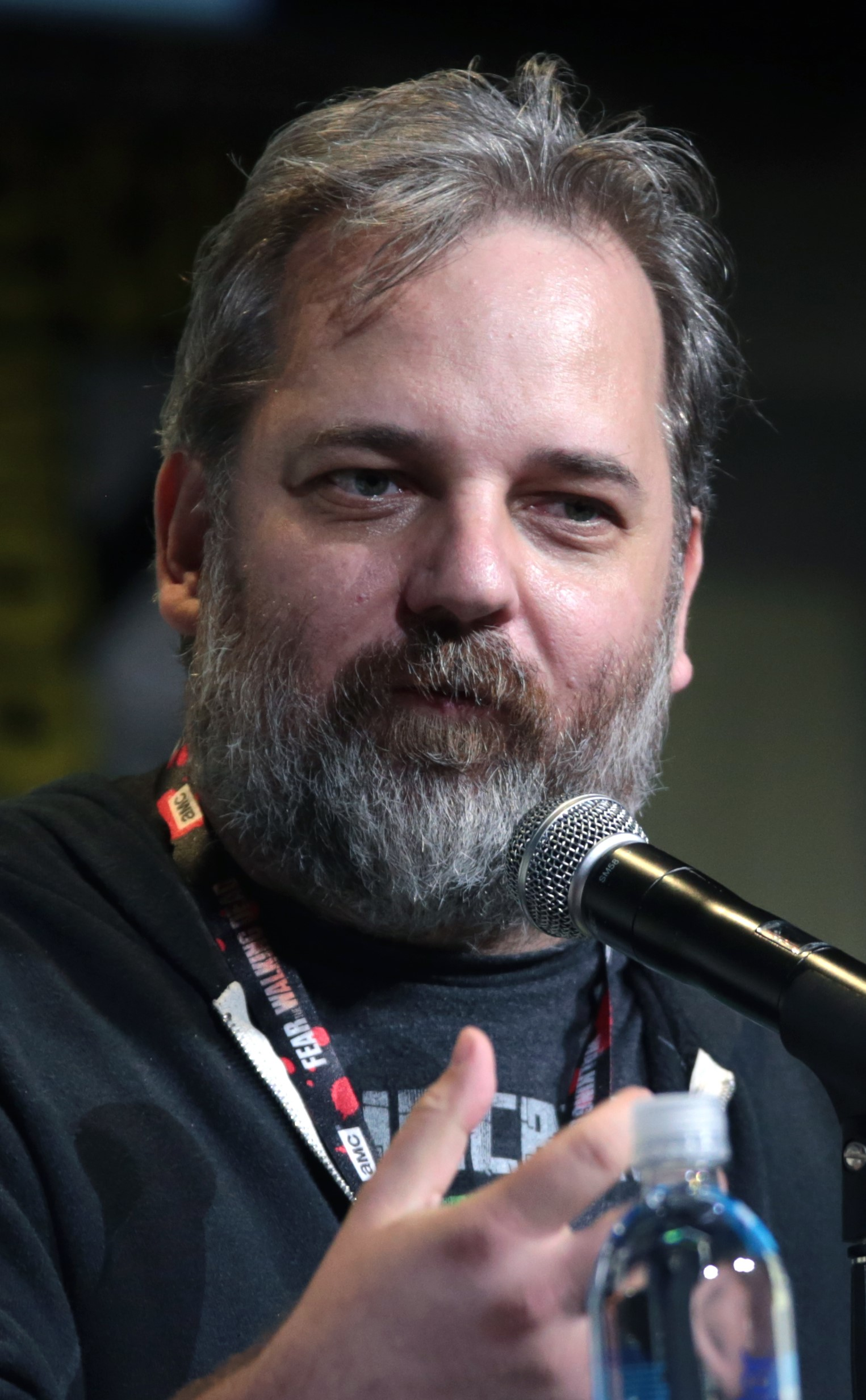
Dan Harmon, the creator of Community and a source of inspiration for Jeff's character

Jeff's last name was originally Crocker. His new last name, Winger, was named after Bill Murray's character John Winger in the film Stripes. Jeff's archetype—a narcissistic egoist—was derived from Community producer Dan Harmon, who was inspired to create the show following his experience with a Spanish study group at Glendale Community College. Harmon, who self-described himself as agoraphobic and solipsistic, developed a deeper relationship with the members of his study group. According to Harmon, "I had spent all of my life empowering myself, proving I was a big boy and could do whatever I wanted. But that's only half of a life. So, in that respect, [Jeff Winger] is me."

=== Portrayal ===
I did terrible on my SATs. I couldn't read the way that other students read so I would just cheat, which, you know, in my silly brain I was like this is a skill that I'm developing, how to just get around everything, so in a way that really helped inform the character.

— Joel McHale, speaking to Terry Gross on Fresh Air

Jeff is portrayed by Joel McHale, who had previously hosted The Soup on E!. Jeff's portrayal was shaped by McHale's experiences with dyslexia. According to McHale, he cheated his way through high school and college, akin to Jeff's lie about having an undergraduate degree from Columbia University.

McHale was cast for his likeability. Harmon later stated, reflecting upon his casting of Jeff, "Unless you’re doing something for HBO or FX, it really comes down to whether your star is likeable. And Joel is likeable to the extreme—to the point where you can give him a little bit of unlikable characteristics and all it is is Han Solo, a loveable scoundrel."

=== Personality ===
Jeff's notably abrasive personality and vanity have made him a contemptible yet praised character. Jeff's initial demeanor, described by McHale as "wildly arrogant and selfish", began to dissipate over the course of the series. These narcissistic behaviors manifested in the form of sexual desires in early episodes. In "The Politics of Human Sexuality" (season one, 2009), Jeff's romantic endeavors are revealed to be short, with his phone contact for Britta Perry listed as "Hot Blonde, Spanish Class".

In religious practice, Jeff is agnostic, revealing himself to be such in "Comparative Religion" (season one, 2009), describing religion as "like Paul Rudd: I see the appeal and I would never take it away from anyone, but I would also never stand in line for it".

== Reception ==
=== Commendations ===
Joel McHale has been nominated for and has received several accolades for portraying Jeff. In 2011 and 2012, McHale was nominated for Best Actor in a Comedy Series at the Critics' Choice Television Awards. In addition, McHale received a nomination for Best Actor in a Series – Comedy or Musical at the 16th and 17th Satellite Awards. McHale was nominated three times at the EWwy Awards, first for Best Lead Actor in a Comedy, and then twice for Best Actor in a Comedy, winning both nominations for Best Lead Actor in a Comedy.

=== Analysis ===
Jeff has been compared to Rick Sanchez, another character created by Harmon. Both characters possess attributes of wit and sarcasm, and are of above-average intelligence.
