= Danny Pudi =

American actor (born 1979)

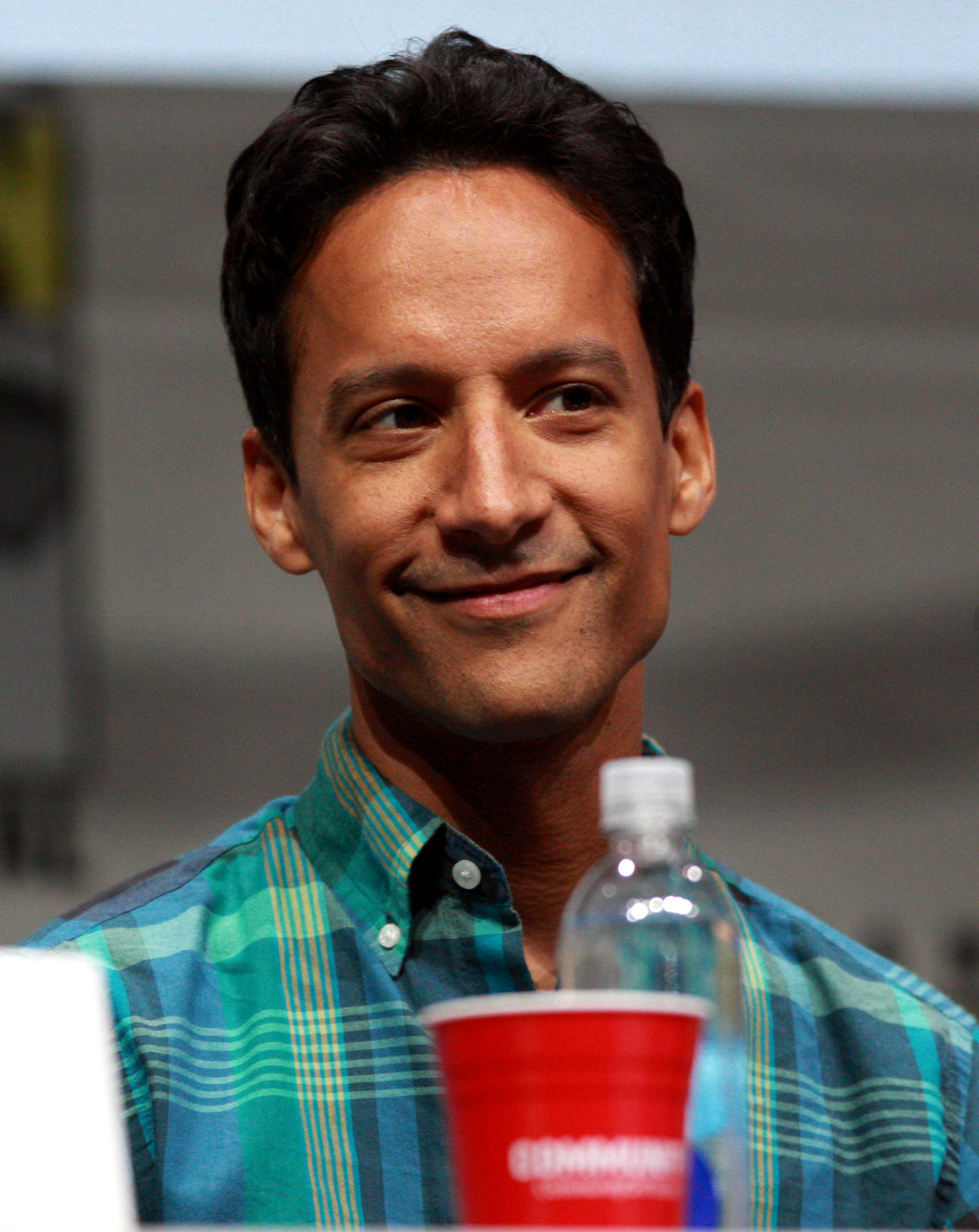
- Pudi in July 2013
- Born: Daniel Mark Pudi; March 10, 1979 (age 47); Chicago, Illinois, U.S.
- Education: Marquette University
- Occupations: Actor; director
- Years active: 2005–present
- Spouse: Bridget Showalter (m. 2004)
- Children: 2

Daniel Mark Pudi (born March 10, 1979) is an American actor and director. His portrayal of Abed Nadir on the sitcom Community (2009–2015) brought him three nominations for the Critics' Choice Television Award for Best Supporting Actor in a Comedy Series and one nomination for the TCA Award for Individual Achievement in Comedy. He also has starred as Brad Bakshi in the Apple TV+ comedy series Mythic Quest and was the voice of Huey Duck on the 2017 reboot of DuckTales.

== Early life ==
Daniel Mark Pudi was born in Chicago on March 10, 1979, the son of programmer and analyst Teresa (née Komendant) and Abraham Lazarus Pudi (1955–2018). He has a sister, Katherine, and a brother, Adam. His parents immigrated to the U.S. and became naturalized citizens. Pudi's mother came from the village of Pokośno, Poland, and his father came from the village of Poduru in Andhra Pradesh, India, and hailed from a Telugu Christian family. Pudi grew up speaking Polish with his mother and grandmother.

He grew up on the South Side of Chicago with brother Adam and sister Katherine. Pudi attended Notre Dame College Prep in Niles, a northern suburb. In 2013, he gave the commencement address at Notre Dame College Prep.

Pudi studied dance in Chicago and attended Marquette University in Milwaukee, Wisconsin, graduating with a degree in communication and theater in 2001. At Marquette, he was the first winner of the Chris Farley Scholarship. Beyond paying for a year of school, the scholarship led to him performing at an improv comedy event featuring Jim Breuer and Dave Chappelle, increasing his interest in studying improv. After Marquette, he performed in summer stock theater in Wisconsin, studied at The Second City in Chicago, and joined Stir Friday Night!, a sketch comedy ensemble of Asian-American performers. Other SFN alumni include Steven Yeun.

== Career ==
Pudi became a recruiter for an executive search firm before moving to Los Angeles in 2005 to seek television and film roles. His job, whereby he was a remote worker, permitted him to attend auditions, helping him avoid the "struggling actor thing in terms of waiting tables, temping and so on". He performed in several television pilots before joining the cast of Community, which he starred in for six seasons from 2009 to 2015.

He has appeared in television advertisements for such products as Snickers, Verizon, McDonald's, T-Mobile, and Far Cry 4. In 2012, he appeared as a celebrity contestant on GSN's version of The Pyramid with fellow Community cast member Yvette Nicole Brown.

In film, he portrayed Arash in the comedy film Road Trip: Beer Pong, and starred in the comedy horror film Knights of Badassdom, which was one of the highlights of Comic Con 2011, according to HitFix.com. He starred in the Jones Street Station music video for "The Understanding". He has made cameo appearances in many internet videos, including BriTANicK's "A Monologue for Three". Pudi had a cameo appearance in Captain America: The Winter Soldier, and the live episode of Hot in Cleveland, as well as a cameo in Star Trek Beyond.

In the autumn of 2014, Pudi appeared in the off-Broadway musical Found. He played the lead role in The Tiger Hunter, an independent film directed by Lena Khan in 2016 and funded through a Kickstarter campaign. In 2017, Pudi began voicing Huey Duck in the DuckTales reboot. He also appeared as Teddy on the NBC sitcom Powerless in the same year.

Pudi plays Brad Bakshi in the TV series Mythic Quest, which premiered in February 2020. His first play, entitled Running, was created for the En Garde Arts' series Uncommon Voices and made public in August 2020. The production tackles his attempt to piece together his relationship with his father, which affected his personal identity, cultural background, and his experience with racism throughout his personal life and career. The play was turned into a short film, directed by Arpita Mukherjee, and released in 2022.

He reunited with Community co-star Alison Brie in the 2022 film Somebody I Used to Know, co-written by Brie.

In 2024, Pudi began his role of The Mechanist in Netflix's live-action adaptation of Avatar: The Last Airbender.

== Personal life ==
Pudi is married to Bridget Showalter. They met while attending Marquette University in their freshman year. Their twins, a son and a daughter, were born in January 2012. Pudi is also a runner and has completed several marathons.

Pudi bought a house in Pasadena, California, in 2014.

== Filmography ==
=== Film ===
Year	Title	Role	Notes
2007	Cop Show	Saffa	Short films
2009	Road Trip: Beer Pong	Arash	
2009	Nilam Auntie: An International Treasure	Melvin	Short film
2010	Blowout Sale	Glen	Short film; also writer
2011	Fully Loaded	Danny	
2011	Hoodwinked Too! Hood vs. Evil	Little Boy Blue	Voice
2011	Where the Magic Happens	Unknown role	Short film; also writer
2012	Leader of the Pack	Doug	Short film
2012	Flatland 2: Sphereland	Puncto	Voice
2013	The Pretty One	Dr. Rao	
2013	Vijay and I	Rad	
2013	The Knights of Badassdom	Lando	
2014	Untucked	—N/a	Documentary short; also director, producer and writer
2014	Captain America: The Winter Soldier	Com Tech #1	Cameo
2015	Larry Gaye: Renegade Male Flight Attendant	Nathan Vignes	
2016	The Tiger Hunter	Sami Malik	
2016	Taken to the Cleaner	Billy	Short film
2016	Star Trek Beyond	Fi'Ja	Cameo
2016	After the Sun Fell	Adam	
2017	Smurfs: The Lost Village	Brainy Smurf	Voice
2018	Lost Wallet	—N/a	Short film; also director
2018	Good Girls Get High	Mr. D	
2019	Babysplitters	Jeff Penaras	
2020	The Argument	Brett	
2020	Coffee Shop Names	Deepak	Short film
2021	Flora & Ulysses	Miller	
2022	Corner Office	Rakesh	
2022	American Dreamer	Craig	
2023	Somebody I Used to Know	Benny	

=== Television ===
Year	Title	Role	Notes
2006	ER	Mahir Kardatay	Episode: "Lost in America"
2006	Gilmore Girls	Raj	4 episodes
2006	The West Wing	Santos Aide	Episode: "Two Weeks Out"
2007–2008	Greek	Sanjay	4 episodes
2008	The Bill Engvall Show	Josh	Episode: "A Reptile Dysfunction"
2009–2015	Community	Abed Nadir	Main cast: 110 episodes TV Guide Award for Favorite Ensemble (2012); Nominated–TCA Award for Individual Achievement in Comedy (2011); Nominated–Critics' Choice Television Award for Best Supporting Actor in a Comedy Series (2011–2013)
2011	Robot Chicken	Various voices	Episode: "The Core, the Thief, His Wife and Her Lover"
2011	Chuck	Vali Chandrasekaren	Episode: "Chuck Versus the Hack Off"
2012	The Book Club	Danny	6 episodes; also producer
2013	Hot in Cleveland	Tommy	Episode: "It's Alive"
2013	Royal Pains	Garrett	Episode: "Pregnant Paws"
2014	Randy Cunningham: 9th Grade Ninja	Levander Hart	Voice, episode: "Unstank My Hart"
2014	30 for 30 Shorts	—N/a	Documentary short; also director, producer and writer
2015	Newsreaders	Ivan Folange	Episode: "How the Sausage Is Made; Lottery Winners Lose"
2015	TripTank	Luger, Matt, Football Player #2, Navigator	Voice, 4 episodes
2016	Dr. Ken	Topher	Episode: "Dave's Valentine"
2016	Pickle and Peanut	Bike Jumper	Voice, episode: "Bike Jumper"
2016	Great Minds with Dan Harmon	Buddha	Episode: "The Buddha"
2016	Angie Tribeca	Garth Tweedner	Episode: "You've Got Blackmail"
2016	Better Things	Danny	Episode: "Woman Is the Something of the Something"
2017	Powerless	Teddy	12 episodes
2017	The Guest Book	Tim	2 episodes
2017	Do You Want to See a Dead Body?	Himself	Episode: "A Body and an Ex-Con"
2017–2021	DuckTales	Huey Duck	Voice, main role
2018	Impulse	Beanie	Episode: "They Know Not What They Do"
2018	Bobcat Goldthwait's Misfits & Monsters	Calvin Reichart	Episode: "A Better World"
2018	Alone Together	Chris	Episode: "Big Bear"
2018–2020	Harvey Street Kids	Tiny, Super Todd, Vlad Villainski, Cheesy TV Announcer, Little Lad, Joel	Voice, 28 episodes
2020–2025	Mythic Quest	Brad Bakshi	Main cast: 40 episodes; also director
2020–2022	Mira, Royal Detective	Sanjeev Joshi	Voice, recurring role
2021	Calls	Dr. Burman	Voice, episode: "Leap Year Girl"
2021	Summer Camp Island	Cookiesmell	Voice, episode: "Shave a Little Off the Wheel"
2022	DreamWorks Dragons: Rescue Riders	Numo	Voice, episode: "And You Are?"
2022	Home Economics	Brian	Episode: "Santa Suit Rental, $25 Per Day"
2022	Kiff	Nick Namé	Voice, episode: "Nicknames"
2022–2025	Transformers: EarthSpark	Bumblebee, Dramatic Voice #2, Smart Trainer 5007, Crowd	Voice, main role
2023	Clone High	Dr. Neelankavil	Voice, recurring role
2023	Strange Planet	Various characters	9 episodes
2023	Carol & the End of the World	Man with a walkie-talkie	Voice, episode "The Beetle Broach"
2024–present	Avatar: The Last Airbender	Sai the Mechanist	5 episodes
2024	Krapopolis	Orphan	Voice, episode: "Ice Week"
2024	Pupstruction	Dusty Whiskers	Voice, episode: "The Big Baby Build"
2024	Rock Paper Scissors	Recyclable Prince	Voice, episode: "Trash"
2025–2026	Going Dutch	Abraham Shah	Main role
2025	Chibiverse	Huey Duck	Voice, 2 episodes
2025	Prep & Landing: The Snowball Protocol	Chef Geoff	Voice; television special
2025	The Simpsons	Jonathan Bryans	Voice; episode: "Bart 'N' Frink"
2026	Golden Axe	Hampton Squib	Voice, main role

=== Video games ===
Year	Title	Role
2017	Hearthstone	Professor George Herbert Doyle IV
