= Intermediate Documentary Filmmaking =

- Community episode
- Episode no.: Season 2 Episode 16
- Directed by: Joe Russo
- Written by: Megan Ganz
- Production code: 215
- Original air date: February 17, 2011

Guest appearances
- LeVar Burton as himself; Jill Benjamin as Nurse; Erik Charles Nielsen as Garrett; Dominik Musiol as Pavel

Episode chronology
← Previous "Early 21st Century Romanticism"	Next → "Intro to Political Science"
- Community season 2

"Intermediate Documentary Filmmaking" is the sixteenth episode of the second season of Community. The episode originally aired on February 17, 2011 on NBC. In the episode, Pierce pretends to be dying after a drug overdose and takes psychological revenge on the rest of the study group for not taking him seriously. He stages a documentary with Abed and plays on the rest of the study group's sympathies by giving them gifts and promises that torments them with their insecurities.

The episode was written by Megan Ganz and directed by Joe Russo. It parodies mockumentary sitcoms such as The Office, Parks and Recreation and Modern Family.

== Plot ==
Pierce (Chevy Chase) is found unconscious on a park bench after nearly overdosing on his painkiller medication and is admitted to a hospital, where the study group rushes to be with him. He pretends he is dying and asks Abed (Danny Pudi) to film a documentary on the "final" moments of his life. Unbeknownst to them, the documentary is in fact revenge in the form of psychological torture for the rest of the group for not taking him seriously, with varying results.

Pierce summons each member of the group to his room for his "bequeathals":

- He gives Shirley (Yvette Nicole Brown) a CD purportedly containing a recording of the group talking about her behind her back. She becomes insecure, although the group dismisses it, then later proudly "forgives" the group for the nasty things she presumes they said about her. Britta eventually forces her to listen to the recording, which reveals an incident where the group defends her when Pierce talks behind her back, and Britta pointedly "apologizes" for being supportive of her. She realizes that she often uses guilt as a weapon, then makes Abed feel guilty for recording her statement.
- He manages to get LeVar Burton to come to the hospital and meet Troy (Donald Glover), causing the latter to suffer a mental breakdown. Troy had previously told Pierce that he wanted an autographed picture of Burton, claiming that "you can't disappoint a picture." He is unable to speak to Burton for fear of disappointing his idol. At the persuasion of Britta, Burton cancels an appointment and spends the rest of the day with Troy trying to communicate with him. In the end tag, the two are seen having dinner together in the library. Burton begins singing the opening theme to Reading Rainbow, causing Troy to run outside screaming in panic, to which Burton happily notes "More fish for Kunta!" (a reference to Kunta Kinte, Burton's character in Roots).
- He gives "sourface" Britta (Gillian Jacobs) a check with the payee line blank for $10,000 to give to the charity of her choice, since she considers herself the most selfless one in the group, but also notes that she could cash in the check herself. Due to her own poor finances, she considers it and begins making excuses to delay donating. She eventually gives the money to the Red Cross, though she admits she only did so because she was in front of the camera, which makes her feel guilty. During a conversation with LeVar Burton (where she references his appearances in both Rebop and Roots), he tells her that she is generous but stupid with her money, making her feel better.
- He gives Annie (Alison Brie) a very valuable tiara, since she's his "favorite." She struggles to understand the gesture's true meaning, before eventually concluding that she understands the dangers of her being too tough on herself and causing pain to people around her. She returns the gift to Pierce, who unwittingly praises her catharsis even though he remarks later in a talking head that it was a straightforward gift because "she actually is [his] favorite."
- He tells Jeff (Joel McHale) that he has tracked down Jeff's estranged father, who is now on the way to the hospital to meet him. Jeff is unconvinced but becomes emotionally distraught and unstable at the thought of facing his father. Suddenly calm, he then threatens to assault Pierce if he finds out that Pierce lied about his father coming, which causes Pierce to panic. A sedan pulls up outside the hospital, and Jeff receives a call purportedly from his father inside the sedan, but it is obvious it is Pierce speaking. Jeff chases the car down, pulls Pierce out of it, and beats him up. By the end of it, he accepts that he needs to confront his father one day instead of avoiding the issue. Pierce thinks that he managed to take the role of Jeff's father on the day, and while Jeff denies it, he later appears very pensive.

During Jeff's confrontation with Pierce outside the hospital, the group gathers round to stop Jeff. Pierce has an outburst where he chastises the group for not taking him seriously and neglecting him throughout the year, though Jeff points out that the whole episode has made the group's relationship with him worse.

Abed wraps up the documentary by saying it was not as easy to make as he imagined it to be, but the documentary format of storytelling works.

== Continuity ==
- Jeff's relationship with his father is further explored in Season 4. He reconnects with him in the episode "Cooperative Escapism in Familial Relations".
- In Season 5, after Pierce has died, Annie receives the tiara again as a gift.
- LeVar Burton appears as himself again in Season 5, episode 5. He and Troy reconcile and travel the world together.

== Production ==
The episode was written by Megan Ganz, her second writing credit of the show. It was directed by executive producer Joe Russo, his 12th directing credit of the series.

The idea for a mockumentary spoof was conceived by show creator Dan Harmon. It was the show's latest attempt at pushing more generic and stylistic boundaries, having already done action/shooting ("Modern Warfare"), zombie Halloween ("Epidemiology"), space ("Basic Rocket Science"), stop-motion animation ("Abed's Uncontrollable Christmas") and Dungeons & Dragons ("Advanced Dungeons & Dragons"). Executive producers Joe and Anthony Russo also wanted a redemptive episode for Pierce, who has been increasingly "evil" throughout the season, for the audience to the character's emotional state.

LeVar Burton guest starred as himself.

== Cultural references ==
The episode pays homage to and mocks the mockumentary-style filmmaking of other comedies such as The Office, Parks and Recreation, and Modern Family. Character Abed Nadir described the style as "fish in a barrel", suggesting that its methods – such as talking head interviews – are a lazy way to divulge a complex plot:

It's easier to tell a complex story when you can just cut to people explaining things to the camera.

He goes on to mock the technique of using voiceovers over random shots at the end of episodes:

You can always wrap it up with a series of random shots, which, when cut together under a generic voiceover, suggest a profound thematic connection. I'm not knocking it. It works.

Craig Sanger of The Washington Times said "the [episode's] main conceit was so spot on, that it really spotlighted what the satirical showcase does best."

Ferris Bueller's Day Off is referenced by Jeff in a heated exchange between him and Pierce in the hospital. This reference is further extended later in the episode with Pierce imitating Jeff's father in a similar way that Cameron imitates Sloane's father in Ferris Bueller's Day Off. Furthermore, the bathrobe that Pierce is wearing in the car is very similar to the robe worn by Ferris Bueller in the post credit scene of that film.

== Reception ==
=== Ratings ===
In its original American broadcast on February 17, 2011, the episode was viewed by an estimated 4.12 million viewers with a Nielsen rating of 1.8 in the 18–49 demographic.

=== Reviews ===
"Intermediate Documentary Filmmaking" was one of the best reviewed episodes of the series' second season.

Jeffrey Kirkpatrick called the episode "pitch perfect" and gave it a 5/5 rating, the highest of the season for the show on TV Fanatic. He praised the episode's use of the mockumentary concept, remarking "[a]s always, Community shines best when it's skewering pop culture." He added "Everything I love about the show was powering on full thrusters, from the impeccable characterization to some of the funniest, wit-laced dialogue in its history..." and that the dialogue was "off the wall amazing."

Emily VanDerWerff of The A.V. Club called it "pretty stellar" and a "great, great episode of television in a great, great season." She praised Donald Glover's performance as Emmy Award-worthy. Despite her concern about Pierce's character arc, VanDerWerff still describes the episode as "an immensely well crafted piece of catharsis that brings a number of things that have been building all season to a head... It gives every member of the ensemble something wonderful to do, and it gives Glover a plot that tops all of the other amazing stuff he's done on the show."

Kelsea Stahler of Hollywood.com gave the episode "a resounding 'Yes'" and singled out Glover for praise, calling him a "comedy god". She said that the show's creators "are proving that they love television just as much (if not way, way more) than the rest of us; so much so that they can take the tropes, styles and techniques of other shows, adopt them into their own amorphous world and still make it work."

Alan Sepinwall of HitFix called the episode "pretty fantastic" and one of his favorite ever. He called both Glover and Joel McHale's performances Emmy-worthy although he did wonder "how the hell [the writers will] dig their way out of the Pierce hole after this", because Pierce's actions on the show undercut the episode's plan to provide his character with some redemption.
