= The Psychology of Letting Go =

- Community episode
- Episode no.: Season 2 Episode 3
- Directed by: Anthony Russo
- Written by: Hilary Winston
- Production code: 202
- Original air date: October 7, 2010

Guest appearances
- Betty White as Professor June Bauer; John Oliver as Dr. Ian Duncan; Patton Oswalt as Nurse Jackie; Amber Lancaster as Christine; DC Pierson as Marc Milliot

Episode chronology
← Previous "Accounting for Lawyers"	Next → "Basic Rocket Science"
- Community season 2

"The Psychology of Letting Go" is the third episode of the second season of Community. It was originally broadcast on October 7, 2010 on NBC.

In the episode, Pierce's mom dies and the group is concerned about the way he's handling it. His deep faith in his cult causes him to believe that his mother is only temporarily gone and will return after a while. Meanwhile, Jeff becomes upset when told that his cholesterol levels are a little high, and tries to take out his frustration by mocking Pierce's beliefs and attempting to prove to Pierce that his mom is dead. The episode's subplot covered the tension between Annie and Britta that began in "Anthropology 101".

The episode was written by Hilary Winston and directed by Anthony Russo. It received positive critical reviews.

== Plot ==
Troy (Donald Glover) is petrified after finding Pierce's (Chevy Chase) mom dead. Pierce seems to be content, saying that according to his "Reformed Neo-Buddhist church," his mother isn't dead but is vaporized and stored in an "energon pod" (a lava lamp), and will return in a few years. The study group becomes concerned and want to help Pierce accept his mom's death, but Jeff (Joel McHale) insists they accept Pierce and his beliefs.

At anthropology class, Ian Duncan (John Oliver) is revealed as the new teacher after the previous teacher, June Bauer (Betty White), was suspended for assaulting Jeff. Duncan clearly is not suitable for the job. When Chang (Ken Jeong) shows up, Duncan abuses the restraining order placed on Chang as revenge for Chang assaulting him in the previous year. As a result of Duncan using his "force field" to keep Chang away, Chang gets injured and obtains a restraining order against Duncan himself. Duncan calls it "mutually assured destruction" and makes amends with Chang.

Jeff's blood test reveals he has high cholesterol level. He becomes depressed and questions the extreme lifestyle he adopts to stay in perfect health. He takes out his anger at Pierce's belief in his cult. He drives Pierce and Troy to the morgue in order to prove to Pierce that his unvaporized mom is dead. While driving, Pierce finds a CD made by his mom and plays it. The recording is his mom's farewell message to him before she died. In it, she insists she is dead, not vaporized, and asks him to accept it. She goes on to explain that life is short and he should make the best of it. Pierce dismisses the message, but Jeff is so touched by it that he decides to abort his malevolent plan. While having (unhealthy) ice cream at the end, Jeff accepts that "nobody lives forever."

Meanwhile, Annie (Alison Brie) and Britta (Gillian Jacobs) are having a fundraising campaign for the oil spill. Throughout the episode, Shirley (Yvette Nicole Brown), jealous about not being invited to participate, makes snide remarks at Annie and Britta. Annie, without realizing, flirtatiously solicits donations from guys, making Britta jealous. She then takes on Annie at her own game, and they end up arguing while trying to raise funds in the cafeteria.

They argue again outside, accidentally ruining the diorama they made, splashing oil over each other. Their oil-drenched wrestling scene attracts the attention of all the men passing by, including Ian remarking "Now this, is why I came to America." They reconcile in the end, with Britta admitting being jealous and Annie admitting that Britta was right to call her out. They also resolve their tension over the love triangle with Jeff and console themselves with the fact that "men are even grosser."

=== Hidden storyline ===
Through the course of the show, entirely in the background of unrelated scenes, Abed can be glimpsed interacting with a pregnant woman and her partner, until he delivers the baby who was conceived shortly after "The Politics of Human Sexuality". He makes no mention of his adventure when he rejoins the rest of the cast at the end of the episode. He then later makes a reference to the hidden storyline in "Applied Anthropology and Culinary Arts".

== Production ==
The episode was written by Hilary Winston, her fifth writing credit of the show. It was directed by executive producer Anthony Russo, his eighth directing credit of the series.

Patton Oswalt guest starred as Nurse Jackie. Betty White appeared briefly as June Bauer.

When asked about the strangeness of the oil-drenched fight scene with Alison Brie, Gillian Jacobs said: "This scene ranks. I mean, I've been asked to do some strange things in my career. But we've topped ourselves from last year's kiddie pool wrestling scene. This is about a 9, I would have to say. Definitely."

== Themes ==
The episode played heavily on the themes of meaning of life, mortality and death, in particular Jeff's realization that death is inevitable despite his efforts to stay in perfect health and Pierce's reaction to his mother's death. Pierce's fierce belief in his cult's explanation of "death" alluded to how people of all faiths (and non-faiths) cope with loss and teach the appreciation of life. During the montage when Pierce's mom's last message to him was voiced over, Abed delivers a baby at the back of a car in the Greendale parking lot. The birth was a reference to the cycle of life and death.

Life is only worth a damn because it's short. It's designed to be used, consumed, spent, lived, felt. We're supposed to fill it with every mistake and miracle we can manage. And then, we're supposed to let go.

— Pierce's mom

== Cultural references ==
The episode mocked the AOL website for providing trivial and unimportant news, in particular, irrelevant animal stories. Pierce's adherence to his cult, which rips him off by selling him the lava lamp and telling him his mother was vaporized in it, is a reference to Scientology. Jeff tells Pierce that the Buddhist meteor crater (where Pierce believes energon is harvested) is at the foot of Mount SkyMall and the SharperImage valley, alluding to two notoriously odd, and expensive, shopping venues. Ian Duncan taking over the anthropology class despite knowing nothing about the subject matter was a knock on the American education system. Annie and Britta made a diorama of the BP oil spill to raise funds. Annie also mentioned the earthquake in Haiti.

The recording of the message left by Pierce's mom for him after her death mirrors the plot device from Taxi. The last segment of the episode features the previous anthropology teacher, professor June Bauer (Betty White), explaining the film Inception to African tribesmen.

== Reception ==
=== Ratings ===
In its original American broadcast, "The Psychology of Letting Go" was viewed by an estimated 4.20 million people, with a Nielsen rating of 1.8 in the 18–49 demographic.

=== Reception ===
The episode received generally positive reviews from critics.

Cory Barker of TV Overmind gave the episode a B+, saying the episode showed the writers "can tell slightly varied versions of their typical stories without sacrificing the humor. And that’s pretty damn great, if you ask me." Emily VanDerWerff of The A.V. Club called the episode "enormously funny", giving it an A−. Kelsea Stahler of Hollywood.com said the episode "had it all – politics, jealousy, AOL News, and even death!" HitFix critic Alan Sepinwall, who played one of the men staring at Annie and Britta fighting, said "'The Psychology of Letting Go' wisely picked up on and wove into a funny and sweet story about mortality, grudges and other things we have to let go of." Matt Richenthal of TV Fanatic gave the episode a 4.1/5 rating.
