= Applied Anthropology and Culinary Arts =

- Community episode
- Episode no.: Season 2 Episode 22
- Directed by: Jay Chandrasekhar
- Written by: Karey Dornetto
- Production code: 221
- Original air date: April 28, 2011

Guest appearances
- Malcolm-Jamal Warner as Andre Bennett; John Oliver as Dr. Ian Duncan; Jim Rash as Dean Craig Pelton; Charley Koontz as Fat Neil; Danielle Kaplowitz as Vicki; Dino Stamatopoulos as Star-Burns

Episode chronology
| ← Previous "Paradigms of Human Memory" | Next → "A Fistful of Paintballs" |
- Community season 2

"Applied Anthropology and Culinary Arts" is the twenty-second episode of the second season of Community. It originally aired on April 28, 2011, on NBC.

In the episode, Shirley unexpectedly goes into labor during the group's Anthropology final. A campus food riot prevents them from getting her to the hospital in time, and they have to help deliver her baby in the classroom.

The episode was written by Karey Dornetto and directed by Jay Chandrasekhar. It received positive critical reviews.

== Plot ==
The study group and their classmates are having their Anthropology final exam, which is a farce. Dean Pelton (Jim Rash) unexpectedly shows up with a reporter for Dean Magazine who's doing a piece on the dean and is invited to observe the final. Dr. Ian Duncan (John Oliver) makes an excuse and escapes.

Shirley's (Yvette Nicole Brown) water breaks, saving the class from admitting that their Anthropology class has been fake. The dean decides to get his car to drive Shirley to the hospital. However, a riot breaks out at the food festival in the parking lot and leaves her stuck on campus. Abed (Danny Pudi) is capable of delivering a baby, (Note: As seen in "The Psychology of Letting Go".) but Shirley refuses to let Abed see her "nethers." Instead, Abed guides Britta (Gillian Jacobs), who had been advocating natural birth to Shirley, through the delivery process. Throughout the episode, Chang (Ken Jeong) pesters Shirley about how "Chang babies" are born, since he is hoping the baby is his. (Note: As seen in "Epidemiology".) During her contractions, Chang calms her down with stories about his relatives' – the Chang babies – births.

Shirley's husband, Andre (Malcolm-Jamal Warner) arrives to help her through the final stage of delivery. Shirley gives birth to a boy, which is clearly Andre's. Grateful for Chang's help during the birth, Shirley names the baby "Ben" after him.

At the end of the episode, it is shown that Dean Magazine shut down after only two issues.

== Production ==
"Applied Anthropology and Culinary Arts" was written by Karey Dornetto, her fifth writing credit of the series. It was directed by Jay Chandrasekhar, his third directing credit of the series.

KUAM aired the episode on Sunday, May 1, 2011 due to The Royal Wedding, which aired the next morning on most NBC stations, preempting the episode.

== Cultural references ==
Abed and Troy compared Pierce's offer to "buy" their handshake to a similar deal in Indecent Proposal. Dean Pelton compared his self-proclaimed father figure role to the horror film Children of the Corn.

Star burns references Spicoli from Fast Times at Ridgemont High.

== Reception ==
=== Ratings ===
In its original broadcast on April 28, 2011, "Applied Anthropology and Culinary Arts" was viewed by an estimated 3.35 million people, with a Nielsen rating of 1.4 in the 18–49 demographic.

=== Reviews ===
The episode received positive reviews from critics. Jeffrey Kirkpatrick gave it a 4.2/5 rating, and praised Ken Jeong and Gillian Jacobs' performance as the best in the series, "by a mile." Cory Barker of TV Surveillance said the episode wasn't "overly complicated", but had "a number of really solid, straightforward emotional beats, something we haven’t seen from the series for most of this season." Kelsea Stahler of Hollywood.com said "Even when we get an episode that's more about love and friendship with Community, we usually find a few great lines along the way. Even so, it wasn't a bad episode. What we found last night, was an episode of Community that was full of heart, a few chuckles and one really fake-looking newborn." Steve Heisler of The A.V. Club gave the episode a B+ score, saying he enjoyed the series "[getting] out of its own way and let Shirley deliver her baby."
