= Paradigms of Human Memory =

- Community episode
- Episode no.: Season 2 Episode 21
- Directed by: Tristram Shapeero
- Written by: Chris McKenna
- Production code: 220
- Original air date: April 21, 2011

Guest appearances
- John Oliver as Professor Duncan; Jim Rash as Dean Pelton; Crystal the Monkey as Annie's Boobs

Episode chronology
← Previous "Competitive Wine Tasting"	Next → "Applied Anthropology and Culinary Arts"
- Community season 2

"Paradigms of Human Memory" is the twenty-first episode of the second season of the American comedy television series Community and the forty-sixth episode overall. It was originally broadcast on April 21, 2011, on NBC. It was written by Chris McKenna and directed by Tristram Shapeero. In the episode, the study group reflects on events from the past school year; many of these memories lead to arguments as they recall and recognize their faults, both as individuals and as a group.

Though it contains almost no material from previous episodes, the episode has the format of a clip show, parodying the genre and self-parodying many aspects of the show itself. Production of the episode required at least 70 new scenes, many of which were filmed during a day at Universal Studios away from the show's sets. The episode includes a notable nod to a shipping video made by a fan and set to the song "Gravity". It also includes multiple references to The Cape, which led to the line "six seasons and a movie".

In its original broadcast, "Paradigms of Human Memory" was seen by 3.17 million viewers. It received widespread acclaim from television critics, with praise going to its numerous jokes, and it is often considered to be one of the show's best episodes. Many critics, along with series creator Dan Harmon, noted the lack of a strong story or message, though most felt this was not to the episode's detriment. The clip show format would later be reused in season three's "Curriculum Unavailable", while "six seasons and a movie" would become a slogan for the show's fans.

== Plot ==
The study group is working on their final anthropology project in the library. Troy's (Donald Glover) former pet monkey, Annie's Boobs, steals a paintbrush and escapes into an air conditioning vent. Chang (Ken Jeong) follows Annie's Boobs and finds a trove of stolen items, including Annie's (Alison Brie) missing pens that caused a heated argument earlier in the year. (Note: As seen in "Cooperative Calligraphy".) Some items remind them of their adventures throughout the year.

They realize the year has had many unfortunate events, though Jeff (Joel McHale) and Britta (Gillian Jacobs) encourage them to look past those events. Abed (Danny Pudi) deduces that Jeff and Britta have been secretly hooking up for the past year. This angers the rest of the study group, who blame Jeff and Britta for the year's problems. The two retaliate by recalling events where each of the other group members behaved unscrupulously. Annie points out many romantic moments between her and Jeff despite his hook-ups with Britta; Jeff denies those moments were romantic by noting similar moments between Abed and Pierce (Chevy Chase).

Overhearing the argument, Dean Pelton (Jim Rash) enters in a Carnival costume, and Jeff criticizes the dean's frequent visits in ridiculous costumes. The dean gets upset and leaves. Shirley (Yvette Nicole Brown) begs the group to stop fighting, but Troy suggests they should let everything out now to prevent future arguments. Abed recalls several similar fights that failed to achieve the same goal. This leads Annie to conclude that the group will always be fighting.

Resigned, the group completes the project. Before everyone can leave, Jeff delivers a speech intercut with his past speeches; he convinces everyone that the fighting will ultimately make the group stronger. Everyone hugs and makes up. The group agrees that Jeff and Britta can keep hooking up, causing both of them to quickly lose interest in each other.

== Production ==
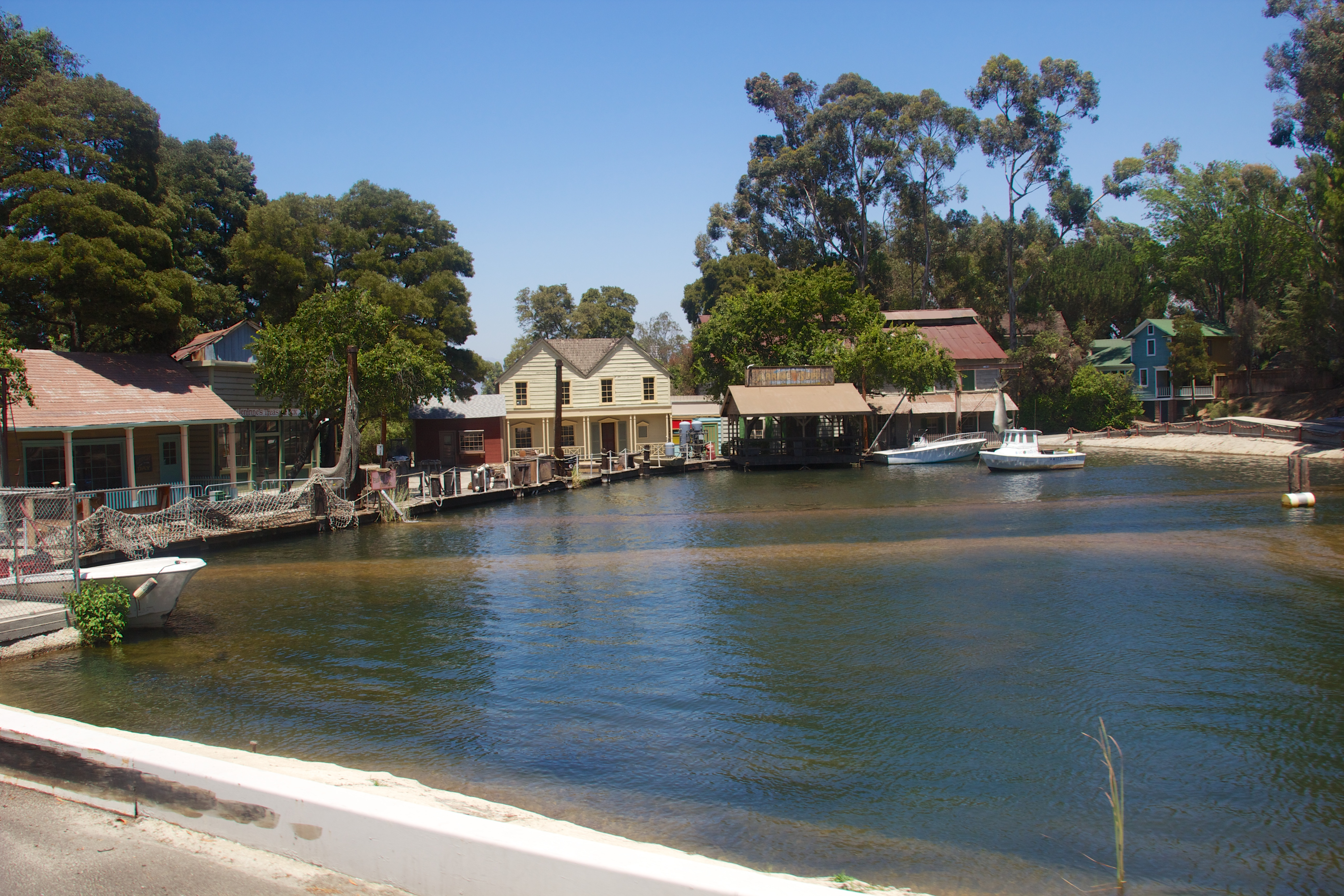
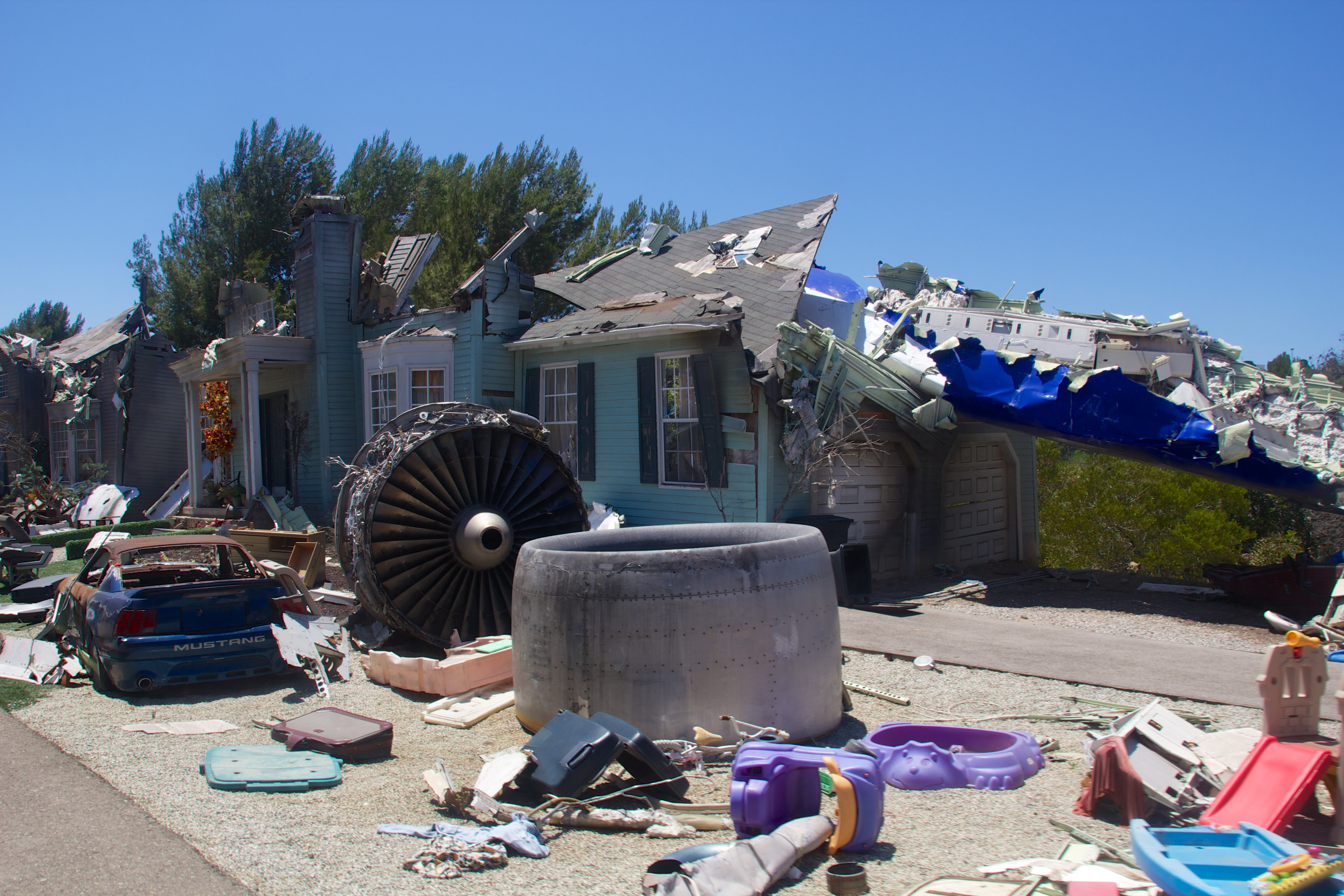
"Paradigms of Human Memory" features many different sets, including ones used for Jaws (top) and War of the Worlds (bottom).

According to series creator Dan Harmon, "Paradigms of Human Memory" was an "experiment" he had wanted to try for a while as a new way of telling a story. The episode is officially credited to Chris McKenna, his fifth writing credit for the series. McKenna later remarked that the script was "gang-written" as the show was running behind schedule. It was directed by Tristram Shapeero, though executive producer Joe Russo assisted with several scenes. In addition to scenes filmed at the show's normal sets at Paramount Studios, the show's cast and crew spent a day filming at Universal Studios. The clips feature a wide range of locations, including sets from films such as Jaws (1975), War of the Worlds (2005), and Psycho (1960).

Although the episode parodied clip shows, most of the clips were not actually flashbacks of the series's previous episodes, but new material. Apart from the claymation scene (which flashes back to "Abed's Uncontrollable Christmas"), all of the flashback clips were written and shot specifically for the episode. The clip featuring Jeff, Britta, and Abed at the Halloween party (a flashback to "Epidemiology") was not filmed together with the original episode, and the set had to be recreated. The episode's end tag is an animated scene depicting one of the Dean's fantasies; Harmon explained in a Reddit AMA that the clip was created by Justin Roiland to fill time because the original cut of the episode was too short. In total, the episode features at least 70 different scenes.

In an interview with The A.V. Club, Harmon revealed he was concerned during editing that the episode would turn out poorly. He also stated that he found it weak from a narrative standpoint, remarking, "I felt ultimately really, really, really good about it. But I will always regret that we weren’t able to simultaneously tell a really great story about the group that made you cry at the end." In the same interview, Harmon expressed interest in revisiting the clip show format, which the show would do in its third season with the episode "Curriculum Unavailable".

== Cultural references ==
The episode frequently serves as a self-parody of the show's tendencies. For instance, the group's anthropology project, building a diorama of themselves building their previous diorama, was a dig at the show's own meta jokes. Jeff also remarks on Abed's frequent meta-referencing, asking why he has to "shove [everything] up its own ass".

Several of the flashbacks reveal that Abed is a fan of the television series The Cape (2011). In one scene, Abed impersonates The Cape's lead character and, in a clumsy attempt to use his cape, knocks Jeff's cafeteria tray to the floor. Jeff angrily yells that the show would "last three weeks", and Abed responds by proclaiming the series would run for "six seasons and a movie". While The Cape ended after one season, the "six seasons and a movie" line would later become a slogan for Community and its fans as the show faced cancellation during its run.

The episode parodied Glee (2009–2015) in another clip by having the study group perform a lyricless song. The scene, in which the group was filling in for the school's glee club after they died in an accident, was later used to set up events in the season three episode "Regional Holiday Music". The multilayered flashbacks by Troy of the group arguing among each other resembled Inception's (2010) multilayered dream sequences. The Dean's numerous costumes include outfits for Tina Turner, Julius Caesar, and Scarlett O'Hara, among others.

The episode also parodied fan-made shipping videos that use slow-motion montages and sentimental music to make the scenes feel romantic. The song "Gravity" (2009) by Sara Bareilles was played over montages of moments between Jeff and Annie and between Abed and Pierce. The scenes were based on an actual shipping video Harmon had seen on YouTube, made by user VeritasProductions and released on November 13, 2009, two months into the show’s first season. Harmon spent $30,000 of his own money to purchase the rights to use the song. He also reached out to VeritasProductions to clarify that the montages were not intended to insult her work. Bareilles would later appear in "Intro to Felt Surrogacy" during the fourth season.

== Reception ==
=== Ratings ===
In its original broadcast on April 21, 2011, "Paradigms of Human Memory" was viewed by an estimated 3.17 million people, with a Nielsen rating of 1.4 in the 18–49 demographic. This was a decrease in total viewership from the previous episode but marked no change in the 18–49 rating. After factoring in seven-day DVR viewership, the episode rose to a 2.0 rating in the 18–49 demographic.

=== Reviews ===
The episode received acclaim from most critics. Alan Sepinwall of HitFix noted that the episode was successfully able to make fans laugh, tell a strong story, and experiment with new ideas at the same time. He also applauded the execution of the format for making fun of both clip shows and itself. The A.V. Club's Emily St. James gave the episode a full "A" grade and considered it "one of the funniest episodes Community has ever done". She found the emotional points to be weak but remarked that the story was "basically unimportant", as the sheer number of jokes carried the episode. Eric Goldman of IGN gave the episode 9.5 out of 10; like St. James, he noted the lack of depth in the story but found it irrelevant given the rapid-fire gags.

Jeffrey Kirkpatrick of TV Fanatic gave the episode a 4.8/5 rating, praising its use of parody and meta references. He compared it favorably to the episode "Advanced Dungeons & Dragons", remarking that the show often succeeded by simply placing the study group in a room and letting things play out. Emma Matthews of Den of Geek was more ambivalent about the episode, calling it an "odd beast" that was funny but ultimately unsatisfying. Paste's Sean Gandert gave it a 9.3 rating; he commented that the lack of story allowed the show to focus on some of the best jokes it had ever done, and he complimented the episode as "clever [and] unique". In a retrospective review, Bill Wyman of Slate characterized the episode as being about "overkill", remarking that it lacked a clear theme beyond a focus on its own complexity. The Atlantic's Hampton Stevens later noted the episode showed how Community was not a sitcom, but rather a satire of the sitcom genre.

In a December 2011 ranking, Wyman rated "Paradigms of Human Memory" first among the show's episodes released up to that time, calling it "arguably the most ambitious, dense, inexplicable and elaborate 21 minutes of televised sitcommery ever aired." Time's James Poniewozik gave it an honorable mention when listing his top television episodes of 2011. A ranking of the show's best episodes by Entertainment Weekly placed the episode second.
