= For a Few Paintballs More =

- Community episode
- Episode no.: Season 2 Episode 24
- Directed by: Joe Russo
- Written by: Hilary Winston
- Production code: 224
- Original air date: May 12, 2011

Guest appearances
- Jim Rash as Dean Craig Pelton; Jerry Minor as Jerry the Janitor; Richard Erdman as Leonard; Jordan Black as Dean Spreck; Danielle Kaplowitz as Vicki; Dino Stamatopoulos as Star-Burns; Erik Charles Nielsen as Garrett; Luke Youngblood as Magnitude; Marcy McCusker as Quendra; Dan Byrd as Greendale Team Member; Busy Philipps as Greendale Team Member

Episode chronology
← Previous "A Fistful of Paintballs"	Next → "Biology 101"
- Community season 2

"For a Few Paintballs More" is the twenty-fourth episode and part two of the two-part finale of the second season of Community. The episode originally aired on May 12, 2011, on NBC. The episode is a continuation of "A Fistful of Paintballs", and picks up from the middle of the paintball game that commenced in part one. The study group realize that the game was a scheme by school rivals City College to destroy Greendale's campus. They band together with other Greendale students to face the City College paintball players to try to save their campus and win the $100,000 prize money for the school.

The episode was written by Hilary Winston and directed by Joe Russo. It was partly inspired by Star Wars, and transitions from the Spaghetti Western theme in part one. It is the third Community episode featuring a campus-wide paintball game, after "Modern Warfare" and "A Fistful of Paintballs". "A Fistful of Paintballs" and "For a Few Paintballs More" collectively are the sequel to "Modern Warfare".

== Plot ==
Chang, Deans Spreck and Pelton, Troy, Jeff, Annie and Abed reacting to Pierce winning the paintball game.

Pistol Patty, the mascot of "Pistol Patty's Cowboy Creamery", the company sponsoring Greendale's end-of-year picnic this year, storms into the hallway accompanied by Stormtrooper-like paintball players and confronts Dean Pelton (Jim Rash). Pistol Patty is unveiled as Dean Spreck (Jordan Black), from rival school City College. He reveals that his plan was to pose as an ice cream company, sponsor a paintball competition, entice Greendale students to wreck their campus with a huge prize, then cheat to claim the prize himself.

Abed (Danny Pudi) and Troy (Donald Glover) overhear the conversation. They convince the "surviving" students to form a rebel alliance to defeat the Pistol Patty troopers and use the cash reward to pay for the damage done to the school. A remote-controlled robot sent by Dean Spreck armed with a paint bomb almost splashes everyone in the room with paint, but Magnitude (Luke Youngblood) sacrifices himself to save the rest.

The troopers capture Pierce (Chevy Chase), but he convinces them not to eliminate him by offering information on Jeff. Abed impersonates Han Solo and flirts with Annie (Alison Brie), who is attracted to his alternate personality. Jeff (Joel McHale) and Troy each want to lead the group, devising separate plans to defeat the troopers. Jeff plans to lead a mass charge on the troopers' stronghold, an ice cream truck armed with a paintball Gatling gun. Troy plans to lure the troopers into the library building before setting off the fire alarm and sprinkling the troopers with paint. Annie convinces the group to proceed with both plans simultaneously, dividing the enemy forces.

Troy, Abed, Annie, and Shirley (Yvette Nicole Brown) draw some troopers to the library and fortify themselves in the study room, where they plan to escape through the air vent. However, the vent is blocked by Garrett, who gets stuck at the opening. They decide to shoot their way out. Troy is eliminated as he tries to storm through the hallway, while Abed and Annie barricade themselves behind some tables. Shirley triggers the fire alarm, sprinkling everyone else in the library with paint as she escapes the building. Abed and Annie kiss as they "die", only for Abed to snap out of his Han Solo impersonation afterwards.

Meanwhile, the ice cream truck's Gatling gun overpowers Jeff's team, and only Britta (Gillian Jacobs) survives. She is picked up by Shirley in a golf cart, and they seemingly manage to shoot all of the remaining troopers, though Britta is eliminated also. As Shirley celebrates, two troopers emerge from the back of the truck and "kill" her, claiming victory. Pierce (who escaped from captivity by feigning a heart attack), disguised as another trooper, shoots them and wins the tournament. He announces that he is donating the prize money to the school, sending everyone into rapturous celebrations.

The study group, minus Pierce, gathers in the library to discuss which class to take together next semester. They agree to "sleep on it." Pierce enters the room to retrieve his day planner. Jeff gets nods of agreement from the rest of the group when he asks Pierce to join them in the next class together. Pierce pauses and tells the group that he'd never been friends with any group of people at Greendale for more than a semester for the same reason he's been married and divorced seven times: he always assumes people are going to abandon him, so he always sabotages the relationships himself before that can happen so he doesn't feel the pain of rejection. He tells them that Greendale has always embraced him despite his many flaws, just as it has for all of them. He then turns down the new class offer by saying that while he still likes Greendale, he is "done with this, whatever it is" and walks away. The group thinks he is acting out again, but they are shocked when he does not return.

In the final scene, Abed, oblivious to the fact that he is talking to the janitor who will be cleaning up the paintball mess, annoys him by narrating what happened in the competition and asking what his summer plans are.

== Production ==
The episode was written by co-executive producer Hilary Winston, her seventh writing credit of the series. It was directed by executive producer Joe Russo, his 15th directing credit for the series.

The season finale was planned to air as an hour-long episode on May 12, 2011, but were split into two parts airing May 5 and May 12 respectively. Creator Dan Harmon explained that the two parts were "designed to exist both as one story" but each had different themes: "second one erupts — the Western motif falls away and an out-and-out war happens. There's a kind of an epic, wartime, band-of-rebels-against-a-larger-force Star Wars feel to the second one."

The set was "decorated" as a paintball warzone by paintball technician Rainey Sutitanom.

The episode was also a culmination of character Pierce Hawthorne's outcast behavior throughout the season. Again, he was the villain for most of the two-part series but became the hero at the end by winning the paintball competition. At the end of the episode, he decides to leave the study group after feeling antagonized by the rest of its members throughout the season. Harmon said the stories involving Pierce as a villain were used "to have the group acknowledge" that he has been ignored.

Dan Byrd and Busy Philipps from Cougar Town (mentioned frequently by character Abed Nadir in the series) guest starred as members in a crowd.

== Cultural references ==
The episode's theme of rebels against a larger force was inspired by the original Star Wars film. The episode parodies Star Wars opening crawl and storm troopers, and the character Abed Nadir does a Han Solo impression for much of the episode. The title "For a Few Paintballs More" is an allusion to the 1965 Spaghetti Western film For a Few Dollars More. The transition from the previous episode's Western-inspired theme to a more Star Wars-like one is directly referenced by Abed: "This means we've gone from a Western motif and entered more of a Star Wars theme."

The episode also spoofs a number of gun-wielding action movies, such as The Wild Bunch, Mr. & Mrs. Smith and Wanted.

Troy is dressed as Cleavon Little's character, Sheriff Bart, from Blazing Saddles.

== Reception ==
In its original American broadcast on May 12, 2011, "For a Few Paintballs More" was viewed by an estimated 3.32 million viewers with a Nielsen rating of 1.5 in the 18–49 demographic.

"For a Few Paintballs More" received positive reviews from critics. Emily VanDerWerff of The A.V. Club praised the episode, saying "the season finale made me realize just how big this 'ensemble' has really gotten, just how big the show's heart is, and just how much everybody in the series is a character, not just a plot point." She gave the episode an "A" and the second season an "A" as well. Examiner.com's Matt Carter described the episode as a "surprising, hilarious, moving, and even action-packed" end to "one of the best seasons we have seen for any sitcom in years." He singled out Chevy Chase's performance in particular, saying it was worthy of an Emmy Award nomination. IGN gave the episode a rating of 9.5 out of 10, while giving "A Fistful of Paintballs" a 9 rating.

Alan Sepinwall of HitFix said that the episode was "a lot of fun" but "felt like more of a goof" compared to the first part of the series. Eric Hochberger of TV Fanatic and Eric Koreen of the National Post also agreed that "For a Few Paintballs More" compared negatively to "A Fistful of Paintballs". Hochberger still gave the episode a rating of 3.5/5. Kelsea Stahler of Hollywood.com said the episode "wasn't mind-blowing, but it was consistently and spastically fun" and "a great send-off". Cory Barker of TV Surveillance said it was "a tremendously fun episode with a number of great gags and lines, but it had less stylistic and narrative depth than last week's first part."

After watching the season 2 finale, Marvel Studios president Kevin Feige hired Joe and Anthony Russo to direct the 2014 film Captain America: The Winter Soldier.
