= A Fistful of Paintballs =

- Community episode
- Episode no.: Season 2 Episode 23
- Directed by: Joe Russo
- Written by: Andrew Guest
- Production code: 223
- Original air date: May 5, 2011

Guest appearances
- Josh Holloway as Black Rider; Anthony Michael Hall as Mike; Jim Rash as Dean Craig Pelton; Julianna Guill as Head Cheerleader; Charley Koontz as Fat Neil; Richard Erdman as Leonard; Jordan Black as Dean Spreck; Danielle Kaplowitz as Vicki; Dino Stamatopoulos as Star-Burns; Erik Charles Nielsen as Garrett; Dominik Musiol as Pavel

Episode chronology
← Previous "Applied Anthropology and Culinary Arts"	Next → "For a Few Paintballs More"
- Community season 2

"A Fistful of Paintballs" is the twenty-third and penultimate episode of the second season of Community. It is part one of the two-part second-season finale, along with "For a Few Paintballs More", and is a spiritual successor to "Modern Warfare" from the first season. The episode originally premiered on May 5, 2011, on NBC.

In the episode, Dean Pelton once again announces plans for a game of paintball, with the winner receiving $100,000. The group slowly teams up to help each other, but they find their friendship with Pierce being put to the test. The group also faces a new threat from a man only known as "The Black Rider" (played by Josh Holloway).

The episode was written by Andrew Guest and directed by Joe Russo. The episode is inspired by Spaghetti Western films directed by Sergio Leone.

== Plot ==
A game of paintball is started by Dean Pelton and "Pistol Patty's Cowboy Creamery"; they explain that the reason last year's paintball game was unsuccessful was that the prize was too important. They announce the new prize of $100,000.

Annie comes back to her base to find Abed, who proposes she join him, Jeff, and Chang in the library. Meanwhile, Jeff and Chang are trapped by the math club, so Chang betrays him. Abed saves Jeff, but Chang escapes. They are interrupted by a stranger, who they believe does not go to Greendale, and manage to escape from him.

On their way to the cafe, they run into Britta, Shirley, and Troy and find out they are working for Pierce, who has set up a safe zone in the cafeteria known as Fort Hawthorne. During dinner with Pierce, he expresses his desire to team up and split the cash. He informs them about a stash of ammo. On the way to the stash, Annie finds Chang and a gang of cheerleaders. Annie shoots the cheerleaders, but Chang runs away. She chases him but is caught by the stranger, known as "The Black Rider". Jeff and Abed arrive and save Annie, but discover that Jeff's gun was loaded with blanks. The study group finds Dean Pelton trapped in a closet and steals paintball supplies from his office. Annie takes supplies and storms off to confront Pierce.

Back at Fort Hawthorne, the group finds it's been demolished by "The Black Rider," with Pierce hiding in the bathroom. When they confront him, Pierce confesses he loaded Jeff's gun with blanks because he was offended to find the group playing cards without him three days ago. Annie admits that they weren't playing cards but were actually voting whether to allow Pierce to remain in the study group. One holdout (Annie) prevented Pierce's ejection from the group. "The Black Rider" emerges, but Pierce appears to have a heart attack. "The Black Rider" does not believe that Pierce is faking it and goes to help, but is shot by Pierce. Having lost the game, he leaves, revealing that he was hired by Pistol Patty's to keep the prize money. Pierce runs off alone, vowing revenge.

Chang is shot by a paintball machine gun from the Pistol Patty's van. Pistol Patty leads out a commando team in white to prevent any of the Greendale contestants from winning the prize money.

== Production ==
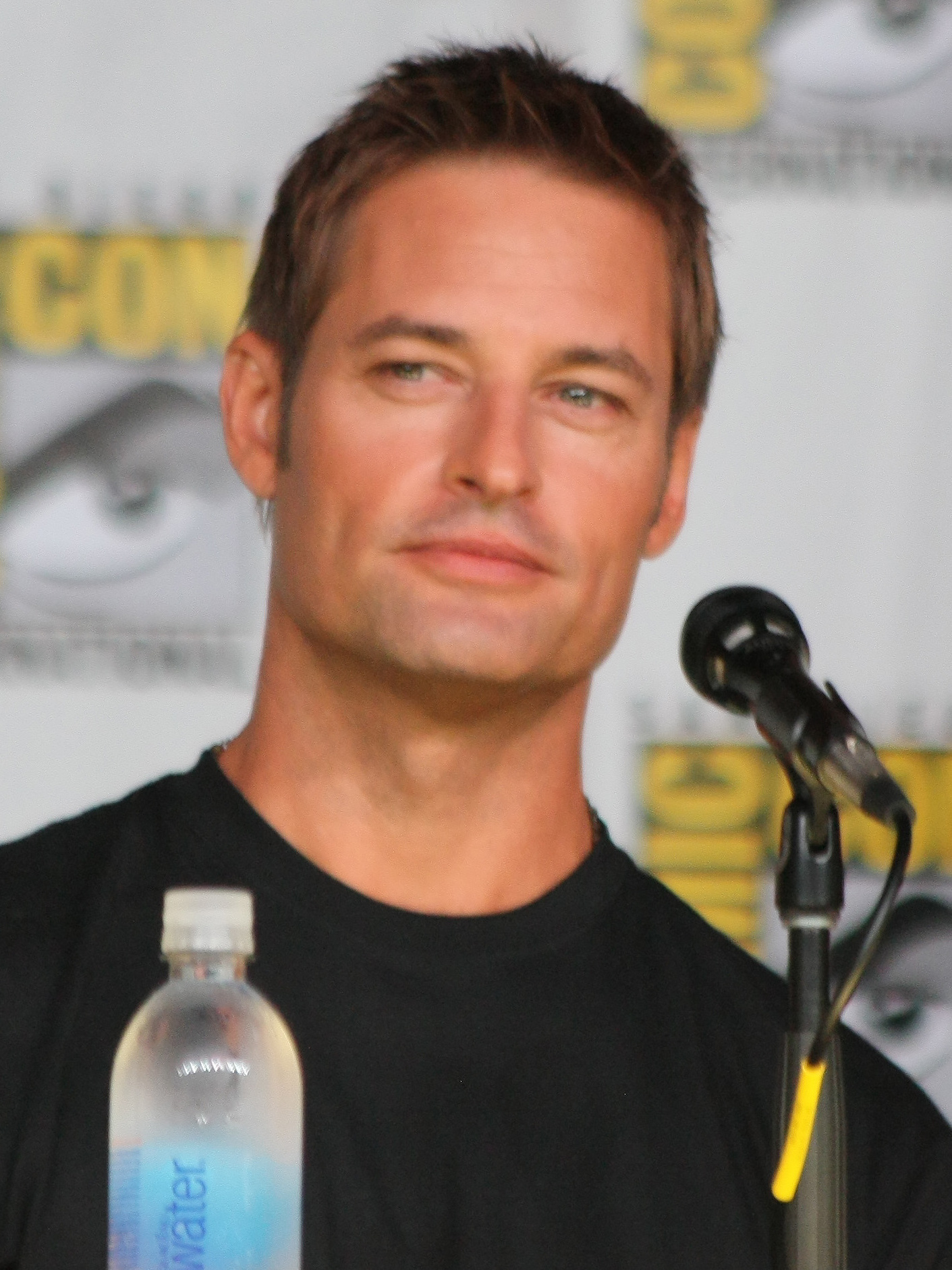
Josh Holloway guest stars in this episode as "The Black Rider"

The episode was written by Andrew Guest, his sixth writing credit of the series. It was directed by executive producer Joe Russo, his 15th directing credit of the series. It was reported of February 28, 2011, by Entertainment Weekly that Josh Holloway would guest star in the season finale as a mysterious character.

Originally scheduled to air as an hour-long season finale on May 12, 2011, the episodes were split into two parts airing May 5 and May 12, respectively. Regarding the concept of the two-part season finale and the return to paintball, creator Dan Harmon said, "It's designed to exist both as one story but also two separate episodes. [The first] one has a Sergio Leone Western motif, so there's more emphasis on tension, scarcity of ammo, and who might draw on who. But the second one erupts – the Western motif falls away and all out war ensues. There's a kind of an epic, wartime, band-of-rebels-against-a-larger-force Star Wars feel to the second one ... If we only did the Western one, there might have been some people who said, 'Oh it's great, but it's not "Modern Warfare"'. And then there's other people who, if we had only done 'Modern Warfare', would say, 'Eh, same thing again.'"

== Cultural references ==
The episode is a tribute to Western films, specifically the Dollars Trilogy by Sergio Leone.

Fort Hawthorne is an homage to the Gem Saloon.

Abed notes that Holloway's character is handsome enough for network television – a nod toward Holloway's performance on ABC's Lost as James "Sawyer" Ford.

Troy's outfit is a tribute to Bart played by Cleavon Little from Blazing Saddles.

== Reception ==
In its original American broadcast on May 5, 2011, "A Fistful of Paintballs" was viewed by an estimated 3.49 million live viewers. The episode received positive reviews from critics, much like "Modern Warfare". Several critics noted the obvious comparisons to "Modern Warfare" when reviewing the episode, saying it does not top "Modern Warfare", but is a worthy companion episode.

Emily St. James of The A.V. Club commented the episode "isn't the season's funniest episode, but it might be the most FUN, and that's where the episode, ultimately, gets me." She also said, "There are so many goofy, winning touches in this episode that it almost feels churlish to write too much that's negative about it." Although she graded the episode an A−, she felt "that it's hard to watch the first half of an intended two-parter and be able to say much about the work as a whole. I'll say that I think this is a pretty great set-up, but it's essentially ALL set-up, and that means a lot of how successful it is depends on next week's episode and how it goes." Kelsea Stahler of Hollywood.com called the episode "a worthy paintball redux" and "a fun, riotous companion to the classic episode."

HitFix critic Alan Sepinwall applauded the episode, saying "the new installment went for depth instead of breadth, focusing entirely on the style of the spaghetti Western and doing a very impressive job of it. The revamped opening credit sequence was gorgeous, the score sounded very much like Ennio Morricone's work on The Good, the Bad and the Ugly, the different showdowns had the requisite number of close-ups, etc." He also enjoyed Alison Brie's performance as Annie, commenting that "She was so fierce, so kickass as a strong loner heroine that I could very easily imagine her as the lead of an actual, not-for-laughs Western." TV Fanatic reviewer Jeffrey Kirkpatrick loved the episode, saying that it even tops the original paintball episode and very much enjoyed the performance of Brie, calling her a "showstopper". Eric Koreen of the National Post said the episode "was daring, stunningly shot and completely unafraid to try to do more than any sitcom ought to."

After watching the second season's finale, Marvel Studios president Kevin Feige hired Joe and Anthony Russo to direct the 2014 film Captain America: The Winter Soldier.
