= Intro to Political Science =

- Community episode
- Episode no.: Season 2 Episode 17
- Directed by: Jay Chandrasekhar
- Written by: Adam Countee
- Production code: 216
- Original air date: February 24, 2011

Guest appearances
- Eliza Coupe as Special Agent Robin Vohlers; Jim Rash as Dean Craig Pelton; Richard Erdman as Leonard; Marque Richardson as Special Agent Glenn Keenlan; Dino Stamatopoulos as Star-Burns; Dominik Musiol as Pavel; Luke Youngblood as Magnitude; Danielle Kaplowitz as Vicki; Derek Mears as Kickpuncher

Episode chronology
← Previous "Intermediate Documentary Filmmaking"	Next → "Custody Law and Eastern European Diplomacy"
- Community season 2

"Intro to Political Science" is the seventeenth episode of the second season of Community. It was originally aired on February 24, 2011, on NBC.

In the episode, Dean Pelton decides to organize an election for campus president to welcome the arrival of Vice President Joe Biden to Greendale Community College. Among the candidates are Jeff and Annie, and the race soon becomes personal between the two. Meanwhile, a Secret Service agent becomes attracted to Abed, and the two pursue an unusual relationship.

The episode, which satirizes American political culture, was written by Adam Countee, directed by Jay Chandrasekhar, and features the second appearance of beloved tertiary character Magnitude. It received mixed reviews from critics.

== Plot ==
Vice President Joe Biden is to visit Greendale Community College as part of his "Biden Time Talking About Teaching" tour later in the day. Dean Pelton (Jim Rash) has seven hours to elect a student president to meet the VP. Annie (Alison Brie) plans to run and has plenty of ideas to improve the school. Jeff (Joel McHale) mocks her idealism and decides to run against her to prove his point.

Nominees are determined by applause from the crowd. Garrett (Erik Charles Nielsen), Vicki (Danielle Kaplowitz), Leonard (Richard Erdman), Annie, Jeff, Starburns (Dino Stamatopoulos), Magnitude (Luke Youngblood), and Pierce (Chevy Chase) are nominated, but Britta (Gillian Jacobs) fails miserably to get crowd support for her outright anti-government platform.

The Secret Service has been observing the campus in preparation for the VP visit, which Abed (Danny Pudi) notices. He attracts the attention of Special Agent Robin Vohlers (Eliza Coupe). She spot checks his bag and dorm room for bomb-making material and to get closer to him. Abed and Troy (Donald Glover) also host a political commentary program on Greendale Campus TV (GCTV) to cover the election.

Throughout the debate, Pierce intimidates Vicki with vile threats. Annie is the only candidate with ideas in the debate, but she is constantly shot down by Jeff, who belts out crowd-pleasing slogans. Magnitude only says "Pop-pop!", which the crowd loves. Vicki eventually quits after another attack by Pierce, who follows her out and reveals he only joined the race to get back at her for not having lent him a pencil. Starburns quits as he fears his drug-dealing reputation will be ruined by his political involvement. Annie screens an embarrassing video of Jeff auditioning for MTV's The Real World, causing him to quit when the crowd bursts into laughter. Annie feels bad and withdraws too. They make up in a storage room, where they are stumbled upon by a remorseful Pierce, who has been stabbed in the face by Vicki.

The race is down to Magnitude and Leonard, and the debate becomes a back and forth between "Pop-pop!" and Leonard blowing a raspberry. In the end, the students vote South Park as the winner.

As Abed and Troy announce the results on their broadcast, Abed closes by making a reference to the production of Napalm. This leads to Vohlers receiving word that Greendale is at "elevated threat level," forcing Biden to cancel his visit.

Vohlers returns to Greendale under the pretense of investigating the "threat" and spends the night watching a movie with Abed in an unusual date.

== Production ==
"Intro to Political Science" was written by Adam Countee, his second writing credit of the series. It was directed by Jay Chandrasekhar, his second directing credit of the show.

Eliza Coupe guest starred as Special Agent Robin Vohlers.

== Continuity ==
During her election speech, Annie mentions that one of her goals if she is elected is to catch someone called "the Ass Crack Bandit". This Ass Crack Bandit would later become the basis of the season 5 episode "Basic Intergluteal Numismatics".

== Cultural references ==
The episode was a satire of American politics, in particular, election debates. The final round of the student president debate consisted of two similar candidates, repeating the same phrases and arguing over the same issues over and over again until the audience wonders if it really matters who wins. After being sunk in the debate, Annie launches a smear campaign against Jeff. In the end, the election was won by South Park.

Jeff was insistent throughout that popularity wins elections, not solid platforms and promises. His opening speech was a dig at charming politicians who pander to voters' need to feel good about themselves. His talk about how "beer should be cold, boots should be dusty, 9/11 was bad and I think freedom is a little better" was a reference to President George W. Bush's speeches. Annie also mimicked the structure of George H. W. Bush's famous line, "Read my lips...".

Also featured in the episode was the Secret Service. One Secret Service agent racially profiled Abed, who is half Arab, to pursue a relationship with him. The agent found nothing more threatening on him, however, than an illegally downloaded DVD of the strongly critically panned film The Last Airbender, which Abed invited the other agent to keep.

== Reception ==
=== Ratings ===
In its original American broadcast on February 24, 2011, the episode was viewed by an estimated 3.79 million people with a Nielsen rating of 1.8 in the 18–49 demographic.

=== Reviews ===
"Intro to Political Science" received mixed reviews from critics.

Jeffrey Kirkpatrick of TV Fanatic praised the episode, saying "There were a number of high points, starting with Abed's notching of 'Classic Wingers' into the study desk, with Jeff similarly notching 'ab mentions' and Troy tracking only notches, but when the gang entered the political realm, that's when it really started to 'Pop Pop.'" He gave it a 4.5/5 rating. Alan Sepinwall of HitFix said there were "some funny moments here and there, and a wonderful Abed subplot, but not one of the season's strongest overall" and the main plot "seemed a bit flat." Kelsea Stahler of Hollywood.com called the episode "average". Emily VanDerWerff of The A.V. Club called it "a very funny episode that didn't quite stick the landing in the third act," blaming it on the weak Jeff-Annie arc. She gave it a B+ rating.
