= Community season 2 =

Season of television series

Community
- Season 2
- DVD cover
- Showrunner: Dan Harmon
- Starring: Joel McHale; Gillian Jacobs; Danny Pudi; Yvette Nicole Brown; Alison Brie; Donald Glover; Ken Jeong; Chevy Chase
- No. of episodes: 24

Release
- Original network: NBC
- Original release: September 23, 2010 – May 12, 2011

Season chronology
- ← Previous; Season 1 Next → Season 3

The second season of the television sitcom Community premiered on September 23, 2010 and concluded on May 12, 2011, on NBC. The season consists of 24 episodes and aired on Thursdays at 8:00 pm ET as part of Comedy Night Done Right.

== Cast ==
=== Starring ===
- Joel McHale as Jeff Winger
- Gillian Jacobs as Britta Perry
- Danny Pudi as Abed Nadir
- Yvette Nicole Brown as Shirley Bennett
- Alison Brie as Annie Edison
- Donald Glover as Troy Barnes
- Ken Jeong as Ben Chang
- Chevy Chase as Pierce Hawthorne

=== Recurring ===
- Jim Rash as Dean Craig Pelton
- John Oliver as Dr. Ian Duncan
- Richard Erdman as Leonard Briggs
- Dino Stamatopoulos as Alex "Star-Burns" Osbourne
- Erik Charles Nielsen as Garrett Lambert
- Danielle Kaplowitz as Vicki Jacobson
- Charley Koontz as Neil
- Luke Youngblood as Magnitude
- Jordan Black as City College Dean Spreck
- Malcolm-Jamal Warner as Andre Bennett
- Greg Cromer as Rich Stephenson
- Betty White as June Bauer
- Andy Dick as Helicopter Pilot/Tiny Man
- Kevin Corrigan as Professor Sean Garrity
- Craig Cackowski as Officer Cackowski
- Bill Parks as Eric Wisniewski
- Dominik Musiol as Pavel Iwaszkiewicz
- DC Pierson as Mark Millot
- Marcy McCusker as Quendra

=== Guest stars ===
- LeVar Burton as himself ("Intermediate Documentary Filmmaking")
- Drew Carey as Ted ("Accounting for Lawyers")
- Rob Corddry as Alan Connor ("Accounting for Lawyers")
- Eliza Coupe as Special Agent Robin Vohlers ("Intro to Political Science")
- Hilary Duff as Meghan ("Aerodynamics of Gender")
- Anthony Michael Hall as Mike ("A Fistful of Paintballs")
- Josh Holloway as Black Rider ("A Fistful of Paintballs")
- Amber Lancaster as Christine ("The Psychology of Letting Go")
- Brit Marling as Page ("Early 21st Century Romanticism")
- Meggie McFadden as Linda Greene ("Anthropology 101" uncredited cameo)
- Jerry Minor as Jerry the Janitor ("For a Few Paintballs More")
- Tig Notaro as Bartender ("Mixology Certification")
- Patton Oswalt as Nurse Jackie ("The Psychology of Letting Go")
- Maite Schwartz as Mariah ("Early 21st Century Romanticism")
- Stephen Tobolowsky as Professor Sheffield ("Competitive Wine Tasting")
- Paul F. Tompkins as Robert ("Mixology Certification")
- Matt Walsh as Joshua ("Aerodynamics of Gender")

== Episodes ==
Season two episodes
No. overall	No. in season	Title	Directed by	Written by	Original release date	Prod. code	U.S. viewers (millions)
26	1	"Anthropology 101"	Joe Russo	Chris McKenna	September 23, 2010	201	5.00
Classes resume at Greendale Community College and the study group enrolls in a new class, Anthropology 101, which is taught by June Bauer (Betty White), an esteemed, but quirky anthropology professor. Jeff deals with the aftermath of last year's transfer dance, where Britta confessed her love for him and he shared a secret kiss with Annie. Señor Chang decides to enroll at Greendale as a student.
27	2	"Accounting for Lawyers"	Joe Russo	Emily Cutler	September 30, 2010	203	4.53
Jeff is re-connected with his former law firm colleague Alan Connor (Rob Corddry) and finds himself returning to his old ways and missing his former life. When Alan takes Jeff to a law firm event to see his former boss Ted (Drew Carey), the study group shows up to "rescue" him, intending to expose Alan as the one who got him fired in the first place. Meanwhile, Chang waits for the study group to join him in a dance competition in hopes that they'll let him in to the group.
28	3	"The Psychology of Letting Go"	Anthony Russo	Hilary Winston	October 7, 2010	202	4.20
After the death of Pierce's mother, the group comes together to help comfort him in his time of need, only to find him in denial of her death in accordance with his obscure religion. Meanwhile, Jeff is told that he has high cholesterol, causing him to rage against the injustice after a life of healthy eating and exercise, Dr. Duncan struggles to take over the anthropology class, while abusing his restraining order against Chang, and Britta and Annie clash over their methods of raising funds for an oil spill.
29	4	"Basic Rocket Science"	Anthony Russo	Andy Bobrow	October 14, 2010	204	4.81
Dean Pelton acquires a spaceflight simulator for Greendale after City College announces one of its own. The study group becomes trapped in the simulator as it is towed off campus, with Abed left behind to attempt to guide them safely back.
30	5	"Messianic Myths and Ancient Peoples"	Tristram Shapeero	Andrew Guest	October 21, 2010	205	4.46
Shirley gets inspired to create a religious film, and after reading the Bible, Abed becomes very enthusiastic and wants to make his own, putting him into extreme conflict with Shirley learning its a film that equates a film director with Jesus and his camera with God. Meanwhile, Pierce struggles to come to terms with being the oldest member of the group and is recruited by another set of students his own age, known around the campus as "hipsters".
31	6	"Epidemiology"	Anthony Hemingway	Karey Dornetto	October 28, 2010	206	5.64
At Greendale's Halloween Party, several students ingest a bio-hazard substance, causing them to exhibit flu-like symptoms and they soon begin turning into zombies. It is up to the remaining members of the group to save themselves and the school when Dean Pelton locks them in with the zombie-infected student body.
32	7	"Aerodynamics of Gender"	Tristram Shapeero	Adam Countee	November 4, 2010	207	4.61
After a classroom smackdown with a group of "mean girls" led by Meghan (Hilary Duff), Britta, Shirley, and Annie bond with Abed by turning him into the ultimate "mean girl". Meanwhile, Jeff and Troy embrace a zen-like spirituality under the guidance of a groundskeeper (Matt Walsh) when they come across a secret trampoline on campus, all the while Pierce attempts to uncover the source of their new bliss.
33	8	"Cooperative Calligraphy"	Joe Russo	Megan Ganz	November 11, 2010	208	4.53
When Annie's pen goes missing, she suspects that a member of the study group is the thief. On a mission to find the pen and solve the mystery, the group takes a self-imposed lockdown and Jeff takes the lead in conducting the search, forcing themselves into a "bottle episode".
34	9	"Conspiracy Theories and Interior Design"	Adam Davidson	Chris McKenna	November 18, 2010	210	4.41
After Dean Pelton discovers that Jeff has listed a class that doesn't exist, "Conspiracy Theories in U.S. History", things become more complicated when the mysterious "Professor Professorson" (Kevin Corrigan) emerges to confirm the truth, despite Jeff having made the whole thing up. Meanwhile, Abed and Troy build the most elaborate blanket fort across the school.
35	10	"Mixology Certification"	Jay Chandrasekhar	Andy Bobrow	December 2, 2010	209	4.55
When the study group convenes to celebrate Troy's birthday, they realize he is actually turning 21 and decide to hit the bars. While Jeff and Britta ingest a few too many cocktails and get silly, Shirley gets busy pulling down incriminating photos of herself that are posted at the bar, Pierce gets stuck in his resolve of not taking help from others, Annie embraces the identity on her fake ID, while Abed delves into conversation with a fellow sci-fi nerd (Paul F. Tompkins).
36	11	"Abed's Uncontrollable Christmas"	Duke Johnson	Dino Stamatopoulos & Dan Harmon	December 9, 2010	222	4.29
When Abed begins seeing the world as stop-motion animation, he takes it as a sign that he and the group must re-discover the meaning of Christmas. Jeff and Britta, concerned about Abed's mental state, enlist Duncan to trick him into a group therapy session to explore his winter wonderland and unravel the truth behind Abed's madness.
37	12	"Asian Population Studies"	Anthony Russo	Emily Cutler	January 20, 2011	211	4.73
The group debates whether Annie's new crush Rich (Greg Cromer) or Chang should be new additions to the group. Meanwhile, Shirley has big news to reveal when her ex-husband Andre (Malcolm-Jamal Warner) returns.
38	13	"Celebrity Pharmacology"	Fred Goss	Hilary Winston	January 27, 2011	212	4.59
Annie convinces the group to put on a middle school anti-drug production, but finds it continually derailed by Pierce's efforts to give himself a better role. Meanwhile, Chang attempts to connect with Shirley, while a prank involving Britta's phone puts Jeff in an awkward situation.
39	14	"Advanced Dungeons & Dragons"	Joe Russo	Andrew Guest	February 3, 2011	214	4.37
Jeff invites "Fat Neil" (Charley Koontz) to play a game of Dungeons & Dragons with the rest of the study group, hoping to boost his confidence, after Jeff becomes concerned about his mental health. When Pierce finds out he was not invited, he joins anyway, disrupting their plans.
40	15	"Early 21st Century Romanticism"	Steven Sprung	Karey Dornetto	February 10, 2011	213	3.81
During Valentine's Day, Abed and Troy compete over the college librarian. Britta befriends a female student who she thinks is gay, and Jeff is forced to throw a party at his apartment when Duncan invites himself over to watch a soccer game.
41	16	"Intermediate Documentary Filmmaking"	Joe Russo	Megan Ganz	February 17, 2011	215	4.11
Pierce pretends to be dying and gives the study group specific gifts that are actually meant to torment them. Britta wonders what to do with a blank check for "charity", Jeff ponders the idea of meeting his father, and Troy gets to meet LeVar Burton, while Abed films the whole thing for a documentary.
42	17	"Intro to Political Science"	Jay Chandrasekhar	Adam Countee	February 24, 2011	216	3.79
When the Vice President comes to Greendale, Dean Pelton organizes a student body election, which Annie is determined to win against Leonard, Jeff, and Star Burns. Meanwhile, Abed sparks up a relationship with a secret service agent (Eliza Coupe).
43	18	"Custody Law and Eastern European Diplomacy"	Anthony Russo	Andy Bobrow	March 17, 2011	217	4.15
The study group organizes a baby shower for Shirley, while she tries to keep Chang out of her life. Britta is interested in Abed and Troy's new friend, Lukka (Enver Gjokaj), who has a dark past. Jeff tries to get Chang out of his apartment by making him believe that having his own apartment and a job would convince Shirley to let him be in the baby’s life.
44	19	"Critical Film Studies"	Richard Ayoade	Sona Panos	March 24, 2011	218	4.46
For Abed's birthday, Jeff plans a Pulp Fiction inspired surprise party at a restaurant. Unbeknownst to the rest of the group, Abed invites Jeff to another restaurant for dinner based on the film My Dinner with Andre.
45	20	"Competitive Wine Tasting"	Joe Russo	Emily Cutler	April 14, 2011	219	3.49
The study group begins to choose their spring electives; Jeff and Pierce take a wine tasting class, where Pierce meets a mysterious Chinese woman named "Wu Mei" (Michelle Krusiec) who quickly becomes engaged to Pierce, which Jeff is suspicious of. Meanwhile, Britta and Troy explore an acting class where Troy makes up a story about being molested as a child in order to fit in with the group, while Abed picks a course that studies the 1980s sitcom Who's the Boss? taught by Professor Sheffield (Stephen Tobolowsky) who has written a book on the subject.
46	21	"Paradigms of Human Memory"	Tristram Shapeero	Chris McKenna	April 21, 2011	220	3.17
As the study group assembles their diorama for Anthropology class, they reminisce about their favorite moments over the past year (all never-before-seen flashbacks). However, while reminiscing, a secret year-long affair between Jeff and Britta comes to light which threatens to tear apart the group.
47	22	"Applied Anthropology and Culinary Arts"	Jay Chandrasekhar	Karey Dornetto	April 28, 2011	221	3.35
Just as the study group is getting ready for their final Anthropology exam, Shirley goes into labor, leaving the group to figure out the best way to help. Meanwhile, Pierce buys the rights to Troy and Abed's special handshake, ruining it for them.
48	23	"A Fistful of Paintballs"	Joe Russo	Andrew Guest	May 5, 2011	223	3.49
The Greendale campus celebrate their last day of school with a new game of paintball, and after the reward is unveiled, the game takes over the entire school, turning it into the Wild West, with students forming alliances and friendships being tested. During the game, a mysterious man (Josh Holloway) emerges on campus to further disrupt things.
49	24	"For a Few Paintballs More"	Joe Russo	Hilary Winston	May 12, 2011	224	3.32
As the paintball game continues, it takes a dramatic turn as new participants enter, revealing City College to be behind it all. The study group and the rest of the students realize they must unite as one to defeat the enemy and save the school.

== Production ==
On March 5, 2010, NBC renewed Community for a second season.

Guest stars in the second season of Community include Betty White in the season premiere as June Bauer, an anthropology professor. Drew Carey appeared in the second episode of the season as Ted, the boss from Jeff's old law firm, and Rob Corddry also appeared in the second episode as Alan, Jeff's best friend from his old law firm. Hilary Duff guest starred in the seventh episode as a "mean girl" who's a part of a clique that goes head-to-head with the Greendale study group.

The second season featured a stop-motion animated Christmas episode written by series creator Dan Harmon and Dino Stamatopoulos, who plays Star-Burns in the series. Harmon said, "There's a reason for it to be stop-motion animated, but it's not a dream. It still exists within the reality of the show."

On November 3, 2010, NBC ordered 2 additional episodes for the second season, bringing it to a total of 24 episodes.

The second-season finale was a two-part episode featuring Josh Holloway in a guest appearance. The episodes were a follow-up to the season one episode "Modern Warfare" where the students partake in a campus paintball match.

In the episode "Critical Film Studies", Abed mentions he traveled to Los Angeles to appear in a scene in the television series Cougar Town. In the second-season finale of Cougar Town, Danny Pudi as Abed appears in the background of a scene. Cougar Town actors Dan Byrd and Busy Philipps also appeared briefly in the background of a scene in second-season finale of Community. Cougar Town creator Bill Lawrence explained, "They had Abed have a love of Cougar Town, we had Travis have a love of Community, and once we got wind of what they were having Abed say he experienced out here, we were going to try to find a way of Danny being a background character and essentially act that same thing out on our show." Community previously had an episode that featured several shout-outs to Cougar Town. The mutual admiration between the two shows started as Cougar Town creators Bill Lawrence and Kevin Biegel became friends with Community creator Dan Harmon, and would often tweet each other. Also, Community executive producers Neil Goldman and Garrett Donovan previously worked with Lawrence on Scrubs for several years.

== Reception ==
On Rotten Tomatoes, the season has an approval rating of 100% with an average score of 8.7 out of 10 based on 22 reviews. The website's critical consensus reads, "Community unfurls into a marvel of meta-madness in its sophomore season, artfully deconstructing sitcom tropes while repeatedly knocking its own emotional beats out of the park."

== DVD release ==
The second season of Community was released on region 1 DVD on September 6, 2011, and on region 2 DVD on September 24, 2012. The DVD contains all 24 episodes on four discs plus special features, which include:

- Commentary on every episode.
- Outtakes
- Deleted scenes
- "The Paintball Finale: From Script to Screen" featurette
- "Creating Wonderland" featurette
- "Abed's Uncontrollable Christmas" Original Storyboard Animatic
- "Abed's Uncontrollable Christmas" In-Process Animatic
- Season Two Cast Evaluations
- DJ Steve Porter Remixes Season One
