= Accounting for Lawyers =

- Community episode
- Episode no.: Season 2 Episode 2
- Directed by: Joe Russo
- Written by: Emily Cutler
- Production code: 203
- Original air date: September 30, 2010

Guest appearances
- Drew Carey as Ted; Rob Corddry as Alan Connor; Jim Rash as Dean Craig Pelton; Steven W. Bailey as Janitor; Dino Stamatopoulos as Star-Burns; Richard Erdman as Leonard; Erik Charles Nielsen as Garrett

Episode chronology
← Previous "Anthropology 101"	Next → "The Psychology of Letting Go"
- Community season 2

"Accounting for Lawyers" is the second episode of the second season of Community. It originally aired on September 30, 2010 on NBC. In the episode, Jeff meets up with an old friend and colleague from his law firm, Alan, a spineless unprincipled character. He temporarily abandons the group to join Alan and other former colleagues at an office party, which he is invited to by Alan who wants to use him to get promoted. The study group suspects that Alan was the one who got Jeff disbarred, and set out to find the truth at the party.

The episode was written by Emily Cutler and directed by Joe Russo. It received positive reviews, with critics praising the episode's character development.

== Plot ==
Jeff (Joel McHale) stumbles upon a former colleague at his law firm, Alan Connor (Rob Corddry), who is at Greendale Community College for a Narcotics Anonymous meeting. Knowing that Jeff has gone off to spend time with Alan, Chang (Ken Jeong) tries to persuade the group to let him join their team to compete in the school's Pop 'n' Lock-a-thon competition for their diversified Oktoberfest celebrations. At dinner, Alan invites Jeff to an office party for the law firm.

Annie (Alison Brie) remembers Alan from an NA meeting they used to attend together. During that meeting, Alan boasted about outing a colleague at his law firm as a fraud and getting the colleague disbarred. The group suspects that colleague is Jeff and try to warn him, but he is unconvinced. Jeff decides not to take part in the Pop 'n' Lock-a-thon to attend the office party, and Chang gets to fill in for him. He strikes a deal in which he gets to join the study group if they win.

At the office party, Alan makes Jeff persuade his boss (and Jeff's former boss) Ted (Drew Carey) to promote him as partner in the firm. Unexpectedly, the rest of the study group, invited by Alan, turn up at the party as well, annoying Jeff. To find evidence that Alan got Jeff disbarred, Annie manages to seduce Alan into giving away his office number, which disgusts her, and the group spring into action. During the exchange between Jeff and Ted, who is fond of Jeff but despises Alan, Jeff puts in a good word for Alan.

Abed (Danny Pudi) and Troy (Donald Glover) break into Alan's office and obtain the evidence confirming that he got Jeff disbarred. However, they are caught red-handed by the janitor. Annie sneaks in and knocks out the janitor with chloroform. They then feign unconsciousness and wake up as the janitor regains consciousness to make it seem like they were all chloroformed. The plan goes awry due to bad acting, so Annie chloroforms the janitor again. This time, they decide to just run.

The group presents the evidence to Jeff, who brushes it off, saying that such betrayals are normal in the business. Alan makes partner and thanks Jeff for his help. However, he is unable to admit that he betrayed Jeff, pushing the blame to another former colleague instead. Jeff realizes who his true friends are and leaves the party.

At the Pop 'n' Lock-a-thon, Chang had been popping for the team on his own for hours and collapses as the group arrives very late. Jeff joins them and thanks them for caring for him. As they embrace, Dean Pelton (Jim Rash) disqualifies Jeff for "parking" on the dance floor. The team fails to win the competition, meaning Chang does not get to join the group. As Chang realizes this, he laughs hysterically on the floor.

== Production ==
The episode was written by Emily Cutler, her third writing credit of the series. It was directed by Joe Russo, his tenth directing credit for the series. Series creator Dan Harmon said finally having an episode off-campus was something the writers wanted "because they'd dreamed of having such freedom forever."

"Accounting for Lawyers" explored Jeff's origins and his temptation to return to his former glory. It revealed the people he used to work with and the painful childhood reason for why he wanted to become a lawyer, to be someone who could "rise above the sloppy stuff and look at the bottom line." At the end, he realizes that although caring about others can make him vulnerable, it also makes him much happier than he was in his former life. Harmon also wanted to push the theme of "bootstrapping versus blue-blooding and the issues that occur between self-made men and men that are born." He added, "That's a truly American topic. We all worship the dollar and we all sort of dream of being important. And you've got people who are born important, and you've got people who will do anything to become one of those people. And that forms a lot of personalities, especially between fathers and sons."

The episode also portrayed how being in the group made each character better people. Since nearly all the events take place off-campus, each character becomes immersed in an entirely new world. While mingling with immoral lawyers at the office party, Britta and Pierce are tempted to behave selfishly. In addition, Annie's sex appeal was also embraced, expanding her image from a naïve teenager.

Rob Corddry and Drew Carey guest starred as members of Jeff Winger's old law firm. Harmon said Carey's role was a "beautiful piece of casting" because "in a meta sense, he is what he is. In a fourth-wall sense, he is an old familiar friend with a pleasant demeanor and a disturbing amount of power."

== Cultural references ==
Character Britta Perry briefly impersonates Jon Stewart saying "Slow News Day", which itself is an impersonation of Johnny Carson. Ben Chang mistakes the impersonation for Carson instead. After Jeff remarks that Greendale is becoming more cartoonish, Abed alludes to a classic Looney Tunes trope by saying he is going to draw a tunnel in the hallway and jump into it. Alan Connor, who calls Jeff "Tango", later does his own Carson impersonation, which is so spot on that Troy Barnes exclaims "he's got Britta down!" Abed Nadir compares Alan's influence on Jeff to that of Rob Lowe on James Spader's characters in the film Bad Influence. When Chang struck the deal to join the group if they won the competition, Abed remarks in a Batman tone, "The stakes have never been higher." When asked for a conspiracy theory, Troy says "Did you know that Go-Gurt is just yogurt?" The segment during which Abed, Troy and Annie Edison attempt to steal evidence from Alan's office was a parody of heist movies.

== Reception ==
=== Ratings ===
In its original broadcast on September 30, 2010, "Accounting for Lawyers" was viewed by an estimated 4.53 million people, with a Nielsen rating of 1.9 in the 18–49 demographic.

=== Reviews ===
The episode received positive reviews from critics.

Emily VanDerWerff of The A.V. Club said "'Accounting for Lawyers' nicely reaffirms everything that makes the show's character stuff work." Kelsea Stahler of Hollywood.com praised the episode's comedic gags, saying the show "got [her] undivided attention." Matt Riechenthal of TV Fanatic also praised the episode's "hilarious" gags, and gave it a 3.9/5 rating. Alan Sepinwall of HitFix praised the episode for exploring the theme of friendship between the characters, noting that it was less funny but warmer and sweeter: "I think I probably laughed a little more at the season premiere, but "Accounting for Lawyers" felt even more like the show 'Community' is at its best."
