= Critical Film Studies =

- Community episode
- Episode no.: Season 2 Episode 19
- Directed by: Richard Ayoade
- Written by: Sona Panos
- Production code: 218
- Original air date: March 24, 2011

Episode chronology
← Previous "Custody Law and Eastern European Diplomacy"	Next → "Competitive Wine Tasting"
- Community season 2

"Critical Film Studies" is the nineteenth episode of the second season of Community. It was originally aired on March 24, 2011 on NBC.

In the episode, the study group organize a Pulp Fiction–themed birthday party for Abed. Instead, Abed spends most of the evening with Jeff at an upper class restaurant and the two engage in what is seemingly a deep conversation about their life-changing experiences. Unknown to Jeff, Abed is actually using the dinner to reenact another movie. Meanwhile, the rest of the group wait impatiently for Abed to finally show up.

The episode was written by Sona Panos and directed by Richard Ayoade. Although it was promoted as a Pulp Fiction centric episode, the episode also notably paid homage to My Dinner with Andre. It received positive critical reviews.

== Plot ==
Jeff (Joel McHale) and Abed (Danny Pudi) have agreed to have dinner at a fancy restaurant. Upon arrival, Abed acts unusually social and normal, confusing Jeff. Jeff is trying to get Abed to go to the surprise Pulp Fiction-themed birthday party at the diner Britta (Gillian Jacobs) works at. Each member of the group has dressed up as a character in the film.

At the restaurant, Abed tells Jeff about his visit to the set of Cougar Town (of which he is an admirer) and how appearing as an extra in one of the episodes supposedly changed his outlook on life. Having opened up to Jeff, Abed then insists that he and Jeff have a "real conversation" without the usual references to pop culture. Jeff responds by saying that he doesn't believe in real conversation. In the process of explaining himself, he inadvertently lets out his insecurities. He recalls an embarrassing incident where he was forced to trick-or-treat in a "little Indian girl" costume. As he is getting comfortable opening up to Abed, the waiter stops by and accidentally reveals that the dinner was a reenactment of My Dinner with Andre planned by Abed.

Meanwhile, at the diner, Troy (Donald Glover) is jealous and intrigued by the briefcase Jeff has gotten for Abed for this birthday. Chang (Ken Jeong) incessantly tempts him to open it. Britta has booked the diner for the party up till 8 pm. When the party still hasn't started long after that, her boss becomes annoyed and spitefully reveals to Annie and Shirley that Britta is an outcast at work, too, mocking her offer to give him her tips from her next shift. Troy breaks and opens the briefcase, finding a lightbulb and a "Certificate of Authenticity" (later revealed to be a forgery from eBay) claiming that the briefcase is the actual prop from the movie. After he closes it, the lightbulb overheats and the briefcase catches fire. When Chang blames him for the mishap and accuses him of "being a bad friend" to Abed, an enraged Troy attacks him, breaking some items in the diner in the process.

Jeff gets angry when he finds out that Abed's talk was an act. The rest of the group arrive at the restaurant very upset. Jeff strikes a deal with the diner owner to pay $800 of the damages, but Britta is fired. Abed meets Jeff at the diner and reveals that he set up the reenactment to get closer to Jeff as he feels they have been drifting apart. Jeff accepts that this is simply Abed's way of expressing friendship.

In the penultimate scene, the group, still dressed up, celebrate at the restaurant. In the final voiceover, Jeff says "... I doubt I'll ever forget my Dinner with Andre dinner with Abed."

In the end tag, Abed & Troy once again eat at the restaurant. Unfortunately, neither Abed or Troy can pay the check, so they both decide to run.

== Production ==
The episode was written by Sona Panos, her first writing credit for the series. It was directed by guest director Richard Ayoade, who had worked with series semi-regular John Oliver while in the Cambridge troupe the Footlights. Ayoade and Joel McHale also starred together in the never-picked up pilot of an American remake of The IT Crowd (with Ayoade reprising his role and McHale taking the place of Chris O'Dowd).

== Promotion ==
"Critical Film Studies" was heavily promoted by NBC as the "Pulp Fiction episode". The network ran many promo slots for the episode hoping to capitalize on the film's iconic cultural status, which was unusual for the show. Many of the show's actors and writers also tweeted about the episode, though show creator Dan Harmon cautioned that the episode was less of an homage to Pulp Fiction than was promised by NBC.

== Cultural references ==
The episode is an homage to the 1981 film My Dinner with Andre. Just like the film, the episode is centered almost entirely on two characters—Jeff and Abed—conversing in an upper class restaurant. The film is unknown by most people. The story exploits the elusive knowledge of the film keeping the audience, and Jeff, suspended from the idea that Abed is actually playing a movie bit. The characters, after discussing life-changing experiences of their own, open up to each other, creating a much deeper friendship in the process. Abed also wore a similar sweater to the one worn by Andre Gregory in the film. Jeff's narration throughout the episode also imitates the film. The piece of piano music played over the episode's final scenes is the same piece used in the film, Erik Satie's Gymnopédie No. 1.

The first part of Jeff and Abed's conversation focuses heavily on Abed's visit to the set of Cougar Town. Actor Danny Pudi made an actual cameo in the season 2 finale of Cougar Town playing the part of Abed. Jeff mocks the name of the series: "If you want me to take it seriously, stop saying its name."

The episode also made many references to the 1994 film Pulp Fiction. Aside from the Pulp Fiction-themed birthday party set in the 1950s diner, it also spoofed the MacGuffin plot device involving the mysterious briefcase. The study group dressed up as characters from the film:

- Jeff as Vincent Vega
- Britta as Mia Wallace
- Shirley as Jules Winnfield
- Troy as Pumpkin
- Annie as Yolanda or "Honey Bunny"
- Chang as Butch Coolidge
- Pierce as the Gimp

== Reception ==
=== Ratings ===
In its original American broadcast on March 24, 2011, the episode was viewed by an estimated 4.46 million people, with a Nielsen rating of 1.8 in the 18–49 demographic.

=== Reviews ===
"Critical Film Studies" received positive reviews from critics.

Emily VanDerWerff of The A.V. Club praised the episode's strong emotional tone: "'Film Studies' demonstrate that, yes, these are characters who do care about each other and want each other to be well. They're not just joke machines; they're people with feelings and passions that go beyond the latest movie homage... an elaborate film homage, yes, but it's also one of the most humane things the show has ever done, a half hour of TV about what it means to be a good friend."

Kelsea Stahler of Hollywood.com called it "a little bit of a pill", but still "one of my favorite episodes of the show ever."

Alan Sepinwall of HitFix said the episode traded funniness for complexity, but praised the execution: "Doing an episode with that many layers, and with such a small number of overt jokes, that tries to have its cake and eat it too with the emotional life of a character who can only sort of be said to have an emotional life?... That takes some major-league huevos, and I applaud Pudi, Joel McHale, writer Sona Panos, special guest director Richard Ayode [sic] (from "The IT Crowd") and everyone else involved for both trying it and pulling it off."

Sean Gandert of Paste praised the episode's change in tone noting that "as with the great years of The Simpsons, one of the important lessons is that to be a great comedy you don't have to feature start-to-finish laughter, you just have to be good." In 2013, two years after its release, Rob Sheffield of Rolling Stone called it the best television episode of the 21st century.
