= Anthropology 101 =

- Community episode
- Episode no.: Season 2 Episode 1
- Directed by: Joe Russo
- Written by: Chris McKenna
- Production code: 201
- Original air date: September 23, 2010

Guest appearances
- Betty White as June Bauer; Jim Rash as Dean Craig Pelton; Dino Stamatopoulos as Star-Burns; Richard Erdman as Leonard

Episode chronology
← Previous "Pascal's Triangle Revisited"	Next → "Accounting for Lawyers"
- Community season 2

"Anthropology 101" is the second season premiere of the American sitcom Community. It was originally broadcast on September 23, 2010 on NBC to a live audience of 5 million viewers.

In the episode, the study group attends their first series of classes in Anthropology 101, the course they had decided to take together in the new semester. The episode also picks up on the storyline that began in the season one finale involving the love triangle of Jeff, Britta, and Annie. Jeff and Britta begin a seemingly-passionate relationship, but the revelation that Jeff got involved with Annie at the end of the previous year disgusts the group. The members start to take out their frustrations on one another. The group is on the verge of breaking up, and Jeff must bring them to reconciliation.

The episode was written by Chris McKenna and directed by Joe Russo. It received positive critical reviews.

== Plot ==
As the new school year starts, Britta (Gillian Jacobs) avoids other students, still embarrassed after she publicly declared her love for Jeff (Joel McHale) at the end of the previous semester, (Note: As seen in "Pascal's Triangle Revisited".) while Troy (Donald Glover) posts Pierce's (Chevy Chase) offensive comments on Twitter without his knowledge. The study group meets in the library, where Britta apologizes for her declaration. However, she soon realizes her actions have made her popular, while Jeff is cast as the villain for walking out on her. Annie (Alison Brie) flirts with Jeff due to their kiss at the end of the semester, but Jeff rejects her advances, calling the kiss a mistake.

The group attends their first anthropology class, where they find Chang (Ken Jeong). Jeff thinks Chang wants to join the group, which Chang denies. The professor, June Bauer (Betty White), presents the first assignment: explaining which one of nine tools is most important to humanity's survival.

Jeff, feeling humiliated, decides to get even with Britta by publicly proclaiming his love for her; due to the setting, she reciprocates. They attempt to upstage each other with outlandish displays of affection. Seeking more excitement, Abed (Danny Pudi) urges the two to get engaged, which they do. Shirley (Yvette Nicole Brown) lets slip that Jeff and Britta had sex during the paintball game last year. (Note: As seen in "Modern Warfare".) Furious, Annie punches Jeff and reveals that he kissed her. The group erupts with anger at Jeff; he points out he kept everything secret, unlike Britta's public declaration. Britta admits that she never loved Jeff and chides Annie. When Troy shames Jeff, Jeff calls out Troy's Twitter activities, and Pierce angrily confronts Troy. Abed, upset by the drama, "cancels" the group. Jeff knocks Abed for being unable to tell life from television; Abed explains that he knows the difference, saying television has "likable leading men," where in reality, the group has Jeff.

Back in class, the group members distance themselves from one another. To help bring them together, Jeff argues that the answer to Professor Bauer's question is actually respect and that they need to respect one another more. Bauer reveals the correct answer: combining the nine tools into a deadly weapon. She attacks Jeff with her weapon until he blacks out. He wakes up surrounded by the rest of the study group, and they reconcile. Troy promises to close the Twitter account. Chang shows up and asks to join the group, and they agree to consider it.

== Production ==
"Anthropology 101" was written by Chris McKenna, his third writing credit of the show. It was directed by Joe Russo, his ninth directing credit of the series. Due to the large number of storylines involved, coupled with the introduction of a high-profile guest star, the episode took a month to break.

Creator Dan Harmon said anthropology was picked as the course the study group is taking because of its potential for story ideas while still having the academic rigor that could justify the group actually needing to study. Another issue that needed to be resolved was Chang's role in the series. The writers decided to improvise when deciding whether Chang should join the study group. "He defines the perimeter of the campfire because he's neither necessarily having a seat, nor is he a monster out in the dark, but he's just sort of out there," said Harmon. As for Jeff and Britta's dynamic after the season 1 finale cliffhanger, writer Emily Cutler suggested making their relationship entirely casual without making a fuss. Harmon said he thought the idea was "genius" as "many of you in the audience have been doing at various points in your lives, particularly the broken points, two of these people have been, in an ungodly middle finger to our fairytale perceptions of monogamy, using each other as sex toys."

Betty White guest starred as June Bauer, the anthropology professor. The episode's end tag (during the closing credits) featured a rap collaboration between Troy, Abed and Professor June Bauer (Betty White) set to Toto's "Africa". According to Harmon, "it just seemed appropriate because of her being [an] anthropology [professor]." A singer named Kasey Truman (stage name Deerheart), hired by the production, portrayed an Irish singer singing a revised version of the song "Linger" by The Cranberries as part of the episode's failed wedding ceremony.

According to Russo, the opening shot of the episode which cascaded across the bedrooms of the study group members cost $75,000. The extended set for the scene was too long for the studio and had to be broken up into two, with the two separate shots digitally reconciled. The opening montage was originally set the song "Campus" by Vampire Weekend before being changed to "Baby Fratelli" by The Fratellis.

Troy's Spider-Man pajamas were a reference to the Twitter campaign that pushed for actor Donald Glover to be cast as Peter Parker in Sony's then upcoming film The Amazing Spider-Man.

== Cultural references ==
The group also discussed the 2010 film Toy Story 3. Harmon said, "I try not to date the show, but I felt like ten years from now Toy Story 3 was so good that it will be one of those movies that everyone saw and everyone cried at."

Troy's Twitter account which quoted Pierce's offensive remarks, @oldwhitemansays, was a jab at CBS's sitcom $#*! My Dad Says which premiered on the same day the episode aired. The account actually exists, and has 77,000 followers as of September 2012.

In the episode, Jeff referred to the Twilight series as proof that "men are monsters who crave young flesh." The song sung during Jeff and Britta's fake wedding is a reworking of "Linger" by The Cranberries. The George Clooney impersonator who tried to convince Jeff not to have cold feet before his wedding is a reference to the film Up in the Air, and he also made reference to the Clooney's role in the widely panned Batman & Robin. Near the end of the episode, Chang appears to have an argument with himself, similar to Gollum from The Lord of the Rings.

== Reception ==
Troy's Spider-Man pajamas was one of the things that influenced comic book writer Brian Michael Bendis to create the Miles Morales version of Spider-Man for the comic series Ultimate Spider-Man. Bendis stated, "I saw him in the costume and thought, 'I would like to read that book.' So I was glad I was writing that book." Glover himself later appeared in various Spider-Man proprieties including Spider-Man: Homecoming and Spider-Man: Across the Spider-Verse.

=== Ratings ===
On its original American broadcast on September 23, 2010, the episode was viewed by an estimated 5.01 million viewers with a Nielsen rating of 2.2 in the 18–49 demographic.

=== Critical reception ===
The episode received positive reviews from critics. Matt Riechenthal of TV Fanatic gave the episode a 4.8/5 rating, saying that the episode tackled complaints that season one focused too much of Jeff's love life and of the cliffhanger finale "by playing it up and mocking it to hilarious results." Kelsea Stahler of Hollywood.com praised the episode for "[taking] the comedy high road, instead of taking the soupy soap opera route" and remarking "I'm glad this show is back." Alan Sepinwall of HitFix said "'Community' opens season two in incredibly strong form, with an episode that turned the finale threads both good (Jeff/Annie kiss), bad (Britta/Jeff/Slater triangle) and uncertain (Pierce/Troy as roommates) to its advantage." Emily VanDerWerff of The A.V. Club called the episode "a little cluttered" but still "a very, very funny episode of a very, very funny show."
