= Aerodynamics of Gender =

- Community episode
- Episode no.: Season 2 Episode 7
- Directed by: Tristram Shapeero
- Written by: Adam Countee
- Production code: 207
- Original air date: November 4, 2010

Guest appearances
- Hilary Duff as Meghan; Andy Dick as Helicopter Pilot; Matt Walsh as Joshua; Richard Erdman as Leonard; Dino Stamatopoulos as Star-Burns; Erik Charles Nielsen as Garrett

Episode chronology
← Previous "Epidemiology"	Next → "Cooperative Calligraphy"
- Community season 2

"Aerodynamics of Gender" is the seventh episode of the second season of the American comedy television series Community, and the 32nd episode of the series overall. It aired in the United States on NBC on November 4, 2010. The two plotlines concern the women's discovery that Abed has an undiscovered talent at insulting people's appearance, and Troy and Jeff finding a secret garden with a trampoline.

== Plot ==
After buying a radio controlled helicopter to fit in, Pierce (Chevy Chase) becomes annoyed when he finds that Jeff (Joel McHale) and Troy (Donald Glover) have lost interest in such things and taken up basketball. Annie (Alison Brie), Britta (Gillian Jacobs), and Shirley (Yvette Nicole Brown) decide to take a women's studies class. Abed (Danny Pudi) joins them, missing hints that he's not wanted.

After losing the game and suffering Troy's insults, Jeff kicks the basketball over a hedge, where the pair then find a seemingly magical secret garden that includes a trampoline. They meet Joshua (Matt Walsh), a mild-mannered Greendale gardener who keeps the area private because trampolines have been banned from the school. They find unexpected bliss in jumping on the trampoline, and Joshua allows them to continue to visit as long as they keep it a secret and never "double bounce" on the trampoline.

In women's studies, Annie, Britta, and Shirley find a trio of mean young women led by Megan (Hilary Duff) who demand their seats, so they join Abed at the back of the class. They find that he has an uncanny ability to pick out people's imperfections (with Abed's point of view visualized as a Terminator- or RoboCop-like display) and encourage him to insult "bitches" who they feel have wronged them.

The next day, Pierce challenges Troy and Jeff to a game of basketball and becomes annoyed again when they say they have moved on but refuse to explain. Troy and Jeff return to the garden, but Pierce uses his helicopter equipped with a spy cam to follow them and discovers the garden. Pierce invades the secret garden and forces Troy to double-bounce him on the trampoline, but the effort causes him to sail off and crash into a garbage dumpster, breaking both his legs.

When Annie, Britta, and Shirley use Abed's techniques to insult women who are in fact innocent, Abed identifies them as bitches and turns on them. But his insulting goes out of control, targeting anyone nearby and quickly making him an outcast.

The school administrators destroy the trampoline and fire Joshua. As he leaves, Joshua says he should never have trusted a black person, and both Troy and Jeff are shocked to realize that they had overlooked signs that Joshua was racist all along. They decide that the exclusivity of their bliss was unfair to others.

Abed gives Megan a set of cards he says are "destruct codes," and she confronts him in the cafeteria with several suspiciously precise insults. Claiming the experience has caused him to realize his mistake, he apologizes to his friends; they in turn apologize for using him.

== Production ==
"Aerodynamics of Gender" was the third episode of the show directed by Tristram Shapeero, and the first written by Adam Countee.

== Reception ==
Around 4.61 million Americans watched "Aerodynamics of Gender".

Emily VanDerWerff of The A.V. Club rated the episode B+, due to not being entirely satisfied with the episode's "mean girls" 'A-story', while calling the trampoline 'B-story' one of the best ever on the show. Time's James Poniewozik viewed both storylines as filtered through the unreliable perceptions of the show's characters, and had some difficulty accepting the "mean girls" plotline but opined that the show was well-constructed enough to overcome any problems.
