= Competitive Wine Tasting =

- Community episode
- Episode no.: Season 2 Episode 20
- Directed by: Joe Russo
- Written by: Emily Cutler
- Production code: 219
- Original air date: April 14, 2011

Guest appearances
- Stephen Tobolowsky as Professor Peter Sheffield; Kevin Corrigan as Professor Sean Garrity; Jim Rash as Dean Craig Pelton; Michelle Krusiec as Wu Mei; Erik Charles Nielsen as Garrett; Danielle Kaplowitz as Vicki

Episode chronology
← Previous "Critical Film Studies"	Next → "Paradigms of Human Memory"
- Community season 2

"Competitive Wine Tasting" is the twentieth episode of the second season and 45th overall episode of the American comedy television series Community. It aired in the United States on NBC on April 14, 2011.

== Plot ==
The study group chooses electives for the spring semester. Jeff (Joel McHale) is excited about his wine tasting class but becomes dismayed when Pierce (Chevy Chase) announces he is also taking it. In the class, the two both express interest in an attractive Asian woman, Wu Mei (Michelle Krusiec). Jeff hits on her but is quickly shot down.

Troy (Donald Glover) and Britta (Gillian Jacobs) attend their acting class, where Professor Garrity (Kevin Corrigan) encourages them to share a painful memory. Troy struggles to tell one before blurting out that his uncle molested him, which earns him sympathy and attention, particularly from Britta. Abed takes a class on Who's the Boss? and asserts Angela was the boss; Professor Sheffield (Stephen Tobolowsky) explains the question is rhetorical and not so simple.

Pierce brings Wu Mei to a study group meeting and announces they are engaged. Jeff suspects Wu Mei is trying to get something. Abed notices Britta defending and caring for Troy; when he confronts Troy about it, Troy confesses he made up his story. Abed tells Troy to defuse the situation, especially since Britta is drawn to people in pain, but in class, Troy keeps expanding his story. After class, Britta kisses Troy.

Jeff meets with Wu Mei and realizes she is not after money or a green card. Abed visits Professor Sheffield, who argues his academic understanding of the show is accurate. When Abed continues to question him, he challenges Abed to teach the next class.

At Pierce and Wu Mei's engagement party, Wu Mei hands Jeff a "Red Dragon" wet wipe. Jeff learns from Chang (Ken Jeong) that her middle name translates to "red dragon". Britta accidentally reveals Troy's story to the group, and Troy admits he made the story up. Jeff interrupts to announce that Wu Mei works for Red Dragon Wipes and is attempting to take over Hawthorne Wipes by marrying Pierce. Wu Mei leaves, and Pierce becomes angry with Jeff for ruining their relationship.

Troy consoles Britta for lying to her and confesses to his classmates that he made up the story. Surprisingly, Professor Garrity applauds him, explaining the pain of lacking pain is still pain. Abed proves in class that Angela is the boss, stunning Professor Sheffield. Jeff brings Wu Mei to the study room and tells Pierce the two might be meant for each other. Pierce and Wu Mei leave for a real date.

== Production ==
The episode was written by Emily Cutler, her fifth writing credit for the show. It was directed by Joe Russo, his fourteenth directing credit for the show.

== Reception ==
=== Ratings ===
In its original airing, "Competitive Wine Tasting" was seen by around 3.49 million Americans and achieved a 1.4/5 in the 18–49 demographic. The 18–49 rating marked a series low up to that point.

=== Reviews ===
The episode received mixed to positive reviews from critics. Emily VanDerWerff of The A.V. Club gave the episode a B−, writing simply, "Competitive Wine Tasting was fine." Joshua Kurp of Vulture thought the episode was a pleasant break from genre episodes and offered "22 minutes of above average, unspectacular comedy"; he liked the dynamic between Pierce and Wu Mei but thought the other two plots were underwhelming. Emma Matthews of Den of Geek described the episode as "something of a hit and miss affair"; she found Jeff to be obnoxious and thought Abed's dismantling of Professor Sheffield's arguments were out of character but enjoyed the final scene depicting an all-black production of Fiddler on the Roof. Alan Sepinwall of Uproxx noted that it was "nice to see [the show] set aside the experiments, do a more traditional version of itself, and still be effective doing it"; he particularly enjoyed Pierce's storyline, remarking that he felt like "a natural member of the group" for the first time in a while.
