= Mixology Certification =

- Community episode
- Episode no.: Season 2 Episode 10
- Directed by: Jay Chandrasekhar
- Written by: Andy Bobrow
- Production code: 209
- Original air date: December 2, 2010

Guest appearances
- Tig Notaro as The Bartender; Paul F. Tompkins as Robert

Episode chronology
| ← Previous "Conspiracy Theories and Interior Design" | Next → "Abed's Uncontrollable Christmas" |
- Community season 2

"Mixology Certification" is the tenth episode of the second season of Community. It was originally broadcast on December 2, 2010 on NBC.

In the episode, the study group celebrates Troy's 21st birthday, the legal drinking age, at a bar. Jeff and Britta try to guide Troy into the new phase of his life. However, the night out slowly becomes silly and depressing due to alcohol consumption, and Troy is forced to become the adult for the night.

The episode was written by Andy Bobrow and directed by Jay Chandrasekhar of the Broken Lizard comedy troupe. It received positive reviews from critics.

== Plot ==
After realizing that tomorrow is his 21st (and not his 20th) birthday, Troy (Donald Glover) and the group decide to celebrate at a bar. Jeff (Joel McHale) and Britta (Gillian Jacobs) argue about which bars are cool, but settle on one called The Ballroom. Britta gives Annie (Alison Brie), who is underage, a fake ID with the name of Caroline Decker from Corpus Christi, Texas. Paranoid about being caught, Annie memorizes Caroline's personal information and affects a Southern American accent.

At the bar, it quickly becomes apparent that Shirley (Yvette Nicole Brown) is an old regular of The Ballroom. The bar has numerous photos of her completely drunk pasted on the walls among those of other regulars. She spends the night nervously trying to take the photos down before anyone in the group sees them. Pierce (Chevy Chase) arrives on his own in his wheelchair, but gets stuck at the door and grumpily refuses any help while running down the chair's battery and stranding himself.

Troy is excited to learn about drinking from the "adults." Jeff and Britta continue to argue, now about what should be Troy's first legal drink. Annie stays in character as Caroline, whom she imagines to be a drifter and free spirit, and tells the bartender (Tig Notaro) about her "friend" Annie, who plans everything out in her life but doesn't even know who she is. Abed (Danny Pudi) meets a fellow science fiction geek, Robert (Paul F. Tompkins), who buys him a drink but is quickly overwhelmed by Abed's passion for science fiction. Robert finally asks Abed outright if he would like to have sex. Abed declines and confesses that he had understood Robert's intentions for some time but just wanted to talk about science fiction. Robert leaves in disgust.

Britta finds one of the photos of Shirley, and she and Jeff and Troy make fun of her. Shirley confesses to having had "a few bad years" and leaves in shame, but grudgingly helps Pierce, who is still blocking the door.

Troy orders his first drink on his own, ignoring Jeff and Britta's advice that his choice, a 7 and 7, is uncool. He notices Annie flush with (alcohol-induced) self-doubt, Abed moping about his exchange with Robert, and Jeff and Britta still arguing (now drunkenly). He abandons his drink and responsibly drives the group home in Jeff's car (which he'd wanted to drive for some time). Britta and Jeff gradually realize that the places they had been arguing about are actually the same bar, which makes Troy angry, as he had been looking to his older friends for life advice and now realizes they're just as clueless as he is.

As he drops Annie off, Troy movingly gives her a self-assuring talk. When he returns, Abed tattles on Jeff and Britta for making out, and Troy chides him like a parent. Jeff is proud of Troy for his sensible decision making throughout the evening and reminds him that he is now truly a man.

The end tag shows Abed helping Troy into 157 T-shirts at once.

== Production ==
The episode was written by Andy Bobrow, his second writing credit of the show. It was directed by Jay Chandrasekhar, his first directing credit of the series.

== Cultural references ==
"Mixology Certification" was a departure from the usual array of pop culture references. Among the real world topics the episode touched on was Troy's Jehovah's Witness faith, which forbids birthday celebrations. Instead, Abed and Annie buy a cake which reads: "Hello during a random dessert. The month and day of which coincide numerically with your expulsion from a uterus" to avoid mentioning "birthday." Annie researches Troy's Chinese zodiac and thinks he is a Horse (1990), even though he insists he is a Snake (1989), leading him to realize he was held back a year in school. At the bar, Abed plays the Asteroids arcade game. He spends the evening chatting with a guy at the bar about the 1984 film The Last Starfighter and the 1999 TV series Farscape. For his first alcoholic beverage upon reaching the legal drinking age, Troy orders a 7 and 7.

== Reception ==
=== Ratings ===
In its original American broadcast on December 2, 2010, "Mixology Certification" was viewed by an estimated 4.55 million people, with a Nielsen rating of 1.9 in the 18–49 demographic.

=== Reviews ===
The episode received positive reviews from critics.

Kelsea Stahler of Hollywood.com wrote that the episode gave viewers "something a little more meaningful". She added, "Normally, I'd be annoyed about a sitcom trying to teach me something about life, but Community has such a humble, but authoritative way of teaching us as viewers that I can't help but appreciate." Alan Sepinwall of HitFix called the episode "dark but surprisingly sweet." Emily VanDerWerff said it was one of her favorite episodes, though she "expect[s] lots of people to just hate it because of how thoroughly it wears its heart on its sleeve." She gave the episode an A of an A to F scale.

Jeffrey Kirkpatrick called the episode "average" and gave it a 2.5/5 rating.

In TV.com's ranking of all 110 episodes of the series, they placed the episode second overall, and wrote "another wonderful example of the bittersweet emotional beats the show could hit when it wanted to ... just a basic sitcom premise, imbued with a slew of great little moments."
