= Early 21st Century Romanticism =

- Community episode
- Episode no.: Season 2 Episode 15
- Directed by: Steven Sprung
- Written by: Karey Dornetto
- Production code: 213
- Original air date: February 10, 2011

Guest appearances
- Andy Dick as Tiny Man; John Oliver as Dr. Ian Duncan; Maite Schwartz as Mariah; Brit Marling as Page; Richard Erdman as Leonard; Dino Stamatopoulos as Star-Burns; Luke Youngblood as Magnitude; Cyrina Fiallo as Claire

Episode chronology
← Previous "Advanced Dungeons & Dragons"	Next → "Intermediate Documentary Filmmaking"
- Community season 2

"Early 21st Century Romanticism" is the fifteenth episode of the second season of the American comedy television series Community and the fortieth episode of the series overall. It aired in the United States on NBC on February 10, 2011. The episode revolves around the study group's various Valentine's Day plans: Abed and Troy ask the same girl to the dance, Britta goes on a date with a lesbian, and Jeff is tricked into hosting a party.

== Plot ==
The study group is concerned over Pierce's (Chevy Chase) reckless pill usage, and Annie (Alison Brie) suggests they stage an intervention. However, Jeff (Joel McHale) disagrees, leading to a fight between Jeff and the study group. Taking advantage of the situation, Dr. Duncan (John Oliver) gets Jeff to blow off the Valentine's Day dance and let him watch the Liverpool F.C. game at Jeff's apartment. Overhearing their plans, Chang (Ken Jeong) shows up uninvited. Duncan lets him in, and Chang secretly invites more people, to Jeff's dismay. Jeff finds that Chang had an ulterior motive for starting a party at Jeff's house—to move in indefinitely. He is ready to kick Chang out, but Duncan encourages Jeff to open up and appreciate those around him. Jeff reluctantly agrees to let Chang stay for a while.

Troy (Donald Glover) and Abed (Danny Pudi) both fall for a librarian named Mariah (Maite Schwartz). They ask her to choose one of them to escort her to the dance. Because she doesn't know either of them very well, she agrees to go to the dance with both of them and decide which one of them to date there. Once at the dance, Mariah is amicable with both of them but ultimately chooses Troy. When Troy asks her why she didn't choose Abed, he becomes upset at hearing her call Abed "weird." He breaks it off with Mariah and returns to make up with Abed.

Britta (Gillian Jacobs) is flaunting the fact that she is friends with Page (Brit Marling), a supposed lesbian, to prove she is open-minded about the topic. However, Annie hears from Page's friend (Cyrina Fiallo) that Page only likes Britta because she thinks Britta's a lesbian. Page and Britta both "don't care about people's preferences" so much that they never confront each other about it, resulting in an awkward kiss at the dance. When they realize that they are both straight girls who thought the other was a lesbian, they stop being friends.

Jeff sends a text to the group, apologizing to them for his earlier argument and saying he loves them all. He also encourages Pierce to let others into his life. In the final shot, Pierce is passed out on a bench after overdosing on his medication.

== Reception ==
=== Ratings ===
In its original broadcast, "Early 21st Century Romanticism" was seen by approximately 3.81 million American viewers, achieving a 1.8 rating in the 18-49 demographic.

=== Reviews ===
The episode mostly received positive reviews from critics. Emily VanDerWerff of The A.V. Club gave it an A− grade, remarking that it felt more like an episode from the show's first season in that it mostly took place on campus and was fairly grounded. She found most of the plotlines amusing and appreciated the episode as a breather amid the season's more ambitious episodes. Joshua Kurp of Vulture appreciated its focus on relationships, particularly Troy and Abed's, and called it one of the show's "most emotionally affecting installments." Emma Matthews of Den of Geek also enjoyed Troy and Abed's story, adding that the show was able to be "sweet, funny and dark all at once". However, Alan Sepinwall of Uproxx was more ambivalent. He appreciated most of the storylines, but he also found Pierce's hallucinations from overdosing to be problematic and thought that element was weird in an otherwise low-key episode. Sean Gandert of Paste gave the episode a 7.8/10 rating, noting that while the episode was funny, the inclusion of four separate plots meant that each one was fairly small.
