= Basic Rocket Science =

- Community episode
- Episode no.: Season 2 Episode 4
- Directed by: Anthony Russo
- Written by: Andy Bobrow
- Production code: 204
- Original air date: October 14, 2010

Guest appearances
- Jim Rash as Dean Craig Pelton; Jordan Black as Dean Spreck; Richard McGonagle as S.A.N.D.E.R.S.; Richard Erdman as Leonard

Episode chronology
← Previous "The Psychology of Letting Go"	Next → "Messianic Myths and Ancient Peoples"
- Community season 2

"Basic Rocket Science" is the fourth episode of the second season and 29th overall of Community. It was originally broadcast on October 14, 2010, on NBC.

In the episode, the study group, except Abed, are trapped in a space flight simulator being towed from Greendale Community College. When they discover it was a plot hatched by rival City College, they work together to complete the simulation mission and bring the simulator back to Greendale in time for the college's simulator launch.

The episode was written by Andy Bobrow and directed by Anthony Russo and is a spoof of the space adventure movie Apollo 13. It received mixed critical reviews.

== Plot ==
Dean Pelton (Jim Rash) acquires an old 1980's Greendale County Museum Space Flight simulator to beat City College to become the first community college to simulate a space launch. The dean gets the study group to clean the simulator as punishment for submitting the winning design for the Greendale school flag, which is actually an anus. The group enter the simulator without Abed (Danny Pudi), who returns to his dorm to get a proper spacesuit. Pierce (Chevy Chase) accidentally closes the door, triggering the machine to begin its simulation sequence. The group are trapped inside as the simulator truck is towed away.

The dean and Abed set up a command center in the library to communicate with the group. Abed is familiar with the machine and guides them on how to free themselves. Pierce, who is claustrophobic, exhibits destructive behavior and threatens to derail the group's efforts, so they lock him behind bars. During the chaos, Annie (Alison Brie) reveals she ordered the simulator to be towed in order to obtain a transfer to City College. When the group finds out City College was behind it, they cooperate to make the launch a success for Greendale. They successfully complete a simulator mission to open the windows, but they are way out of range to have anyone from Greendale rescue them.

Pierce asks to be let out, calmer now. However, when he is released, he charges at the simulator screen and rips it off, which opens a path to the simulator's driver seat. Annie squeezes through to drive the machine back to Greendale just in time for the launch. The group emerge from the simulator to applause from the Greendale community. Annie abandons her transfer plans.

== Production ==
"Basic Rocket Science" was written by Andy Bobrow, his first writing credit of the show. It was directed by Anthony Russo, his ninth directing credit of the series.

Before the episode aired, it was compared frequently to "Modern Warfare" by many, as it was anticipated to be another episode with a pop culture-driven plot.

Yvette Nicole Brown said of KFC's product placement in what was essentially a space adventure spoof: "It's amazing the way the writers have integrated such silliness and wrapped it around a product. There’s biscuit thrusters and gravy throttles. The attention to detail is amazing. The seven herbs and spices are listed in different spaces." Joel McHale called it a "tour de force of information about KFC, working to make the most delicious galaxy."

== Cultural references ==
"Basic Rocket Science" was an homage to the 1995 space adventure film, Apollo 13. The basic plot outline was having the "astronauts" get into an impossible situation and then saving themselves. The episode made numerous references to the film's visuals and dialogue. Abed's role in the episode was similar to Gene Kranz (Ed Harris) and Ken Mattingly (Gary Sinise) in the film. The first scene of the episode, a man bursting in on a meeting discussing City College's acquisition of a space simulator, mirrors one of the early scenes in the film The Right Stuff, where President Eisenhower is informed of the Soviet space program and the need for the Americans to create one.

The space flight simulator used by the study group was called the "Kentucky Fried Chicken 11 Herbs and Space Experience".

The City College space simulator, the "City College Cosmic Pioneer" is a reference to the Soviet Union, as both have the initials "CCCP".

The school motto that the group came up with, E Pluribus Anus, was a play on the US dictum E pluribus unum.

== Reception ==
=== Ratings ===
In its original American broadcast on October 14, 2010, the episode was viewed by an estimated 4.81 million people, with a Nielsen rating of 2.2 in the 18–49 demographic.

=== Reviews ===
The episode received mixed reviews from critics.

Most critics criticized the lack of character development in the episode. Matt Riechenthal of TV Fanatic said it "went to the outlandish well one too many times" and gave the episode a 2.0/5 rating. Emily VanDerWerff of The A.V. Club said the episode "didn't click for me as well as the other episodes this season" but still "very good" and gave it a B. Alan Sepinwall of HitFix said "The jokes are great, but there has to be some kind of emotional story for one or more of the characters. Some weeks it can be a problem invented out of whole cloth; in the end, this probably wasn't one of those weeks." Cory Barker of TV Surveillance said the episode was "okay," and "still a good episode of Community, it's just not a great one and particularly not an all-time effort."
