= Advanced Dungeons & Dragons (Community) =

- Community episode
- Episode no.: Season 2 Episode 14
- Directed by: Joe Russo
- Written by: Andrew Guest
- Production code: 214
- Original air date: February 3, 2011

Guest appearances
- Charley Koontz as Neil; Erik Charles Nielsen as Garrett; Lisa Monahan Aust as Narrator

Episode chronology
← Previous "Celebrity Pharmacology"	Next → "Early 21st Century Romanticism"
- Community season 2

"Advanced Dungeons & Dragons" is the fourteenth episode of the second season of the American comedy television series Community and the thirty-ninth episode overall. It was originally broadcast on February 3, 2011, on NBC. It was written by Andrew Guest and directed by Joe Russo. In the episode, the study group plays a game of Dungeons & Dragons to cheer up a fellow student Neil (Charley Koontz) after he becomes depressed. However, when Pierce (Chevy Chase) learns he was not invited, he begins working against the rest of the group.

The episode draws inspiration from the Dungeons & Dragons games played by creator Dan Harmon when growing up. Harmon came up with the basic premise but allowed the other writers to build a story around it. Having never played Dungeons & Dragons, Guest studied the game with fellow writers and relied on Harmon's experience when writing the script. Filming was relatively easy and inexpensive, with few sets and minimal effects required. However, network and studio executives were not very supportive of the episode, to Harmon's frustration.

"Advanced Dungeons & Dragons" was seen by 4.37 million viewers in its original broadcast. It received positive reviews from critics for its humor and use of its ensemble, though some criticized its portrayal of Pierce. The episode has frequently been listed among the show's best episodes and led to a sequel, "Advanced Advanced Dungeons & Dragons". In June 2020, the episode was removed from Netflix and Hulu due to scenes with Chang (Ken Jeong) in makeup resembling blackface, though it later became available on Peacock and was subsequently restored to Hulu.

== Plot ==
Neil (Charley Koontz) is depressed after being bullied; most of his peers derisively call him "Fat Neil". Since Neil enjoys Dungeons & Dragons, Jeff (Joel McHale) feigns interest in it and organizes a game session with the study group. Pierce (Chevy Chase) is not invited, as the others worry he would offend Neil. Abed (Danny Pudi) serves as dungeon master and explains that the goal is to defeat Draconis, a dragon. He provides pre-made characters for the study group while Neil plays as his own character, Duquesne. The group is inexperienced and struggles initially, but Duquesne easily defeats several goblins with his sword, impressing the others.

Pierce arrives, angry he was not invited. He demands to join, so Abed creates a new character, "Pierce Hawthorne". While the others ignore "Pierce Hawthorne" in the game, Neil has Duquesne provide "Pierce Hawthorne" a cloak. Pierce responds by stealing Duquesne's sword, killing Chang's (Ken Jeong) character, and fleeing. Jeff takes Pierce outside to explain the situation, but Pierce refuses to listen. Since they are now working against each other, Abed takes Pierce to a supply closet to play separated from the group. From there, Pierce obtains a copy of the adventure the group is playing and discovers an amulet to control Draconis.

The group, now intent on chasing "Pierce Hawthorne" despite Neil's reluctance, travels to a nearby town to acquire pegasi. Abed returns with Pierce. As the adventurers fly over a forest clearing, they are able to retrieve Duquesne's sword, but "Pierce Hawthorne" arrives and uses Draconis's powers to freeze time. Pierce has his character transform Duquesne's appearance to resemble Neil. When Jeff protests, Pierce reveals that Jeff coined the name "Fat Neil" in the first place. The group admonishes Jeff while Pierce savors his triumph.

Despite being frozen, Neil uses his turn to show pity for Pierce. The rest of the group follows suit. Infuriated by the inactivity, Pierce unfreezes time. This gives Neil an action, which he uses to destroy "Pierce Hawthorne's" amulet with Duquesne's sword. Without the controlling amulet, Draconis eats "Pierce Hawthorne" and thanks the adventurers by giving them his hoard of treasure. As the rest of the group celebrates and departs, a happier Neil tells Pierce that he enjoyed the game and hopes they can play again. Pierce is left alone in the study room, having learned nothing from the game.

== Production ==
I always wanted to do a Dungeons & Dragons episode. I knew that we had predecessors there. I knew that The IT Crowd did one. I knew that Freaks and Geeks did one. [...] I wanted to just fade into the group playing the game, and how do you tell a story that way?

— Dan Harmon

The inspiration for the episode came from series creator Dan Harmon, who had played Dungeons & Dragons growing up. Harmon sought to build an episode around the game while also allowing the game to fade into the background as the story unfolded, instead of allowing the conceit to simply be that Dungeons & Dragons is a "nerdy game". According to episode writer Andrew Guest, Harmon had first discussed the idea during pre-production for Community's second season. He laid out the basic pitch for the episode – that the study group would spend the full episode playing Dungeons & Dragons – and allowed the other writers to develop a meaningful story. Harmon also provided the writers with a milk crate filled with the Dungeons & Dragons books from his childhood for reference. He credited the idea of the group helping a stranger to the other writers, likening the idea to Saving Private Ryan. The writers also created other concepts for the group's response to Pierce, including one in which Pierce would seal the other characters inside a cube and the rest of the group would start a new game in there, but this was later simplified to the others feeling sorry for Pierce.

Following these discussions with the other writers, Guest wrote the first draft of the script. He had no experience playing the game before writing the episode and relied heavily on Harmon's experience; he and several other writers also watched documentaries and read through manuals to better understand the game. He later remarked that his lack of experience helped to ensure the game was accessible to everyone. Harmon, Guest, and Chris McKenna then spent two days at Harmon's and Guest's homes finalizing the script. During this time, Harmon came up with the idea for Pierce cheating by obtaining the adventure the group was playing.

The table read for the episode received a positive reception, including from episode director Joe Russo, who had also played the game before, according to Guest. Despite this, studio and network executives responded poorly to the episode, deeply frustrating Harmon. In a 2019 Community reunion, Harmon described one Sony executive's response as "We wish you had handed this in on time so we could have thrown it in the garbage." The crew also had some difficulty getting permission from Wizards of the Coast, the publisher of Dungeons & Dragons, to use the game in the episode. However, Guest noted that a contact at the company was a fan of the show, and Harmon's familiarity with the game helped to relieve any concerns from the company.

The episode was inexpensive to produce and could be shot in about four days using few sets, which was one of the reasons for its creation. The episode's opening is modeled after the opening of The Lord of the Rings: The Fellowship of the Ring, including the female narrator and the use of strong percussion. Throughout the episode, many scenes featured musical cues written by Ludwig Göransson and inspired by The Lord of the Rings films; sound effects were also added in a few key moments, but no other major effects were used. Some Dungeons & Dragons rules, such as rolling initiative, were ignored or amended. Guest explained that the focus of the episode was on telling the story, not the details of the game. He remarked that the writers joked they could have spent the entire episode setting up the game, but they "wisely moved away from that".

During its fifth season, the series created another episode, "Advanced Advanced Dungeons & Dragons", that also centered around a game of Dungeons & Dragons and served as a sequel to this episode.

== Reception ==
=== Ratings ===
In its original broadcast on February 3, 2011, "Advanced Dungeons & Dragons" was viewed by an estimated 4.37 million people, with a Nielsen rating of 2.0 in the 18–49 demographic. The 18–49 rating marked a 9% decrease in viewership from the previous episode, "Celebrity Pharmacology". After factoring in seven-day DVR viewership, the episode rose to a 2.5 rating in the 18–49 demographic.

=== Reviews ===
The episode received highly positive reviews from critics. Emily St. James of The A.V. Club gave the episode a grade of "A", stating that despite some cheap jokes and reduction of certain characters such as Pierce to stock types, the episode was "endlessly inventive", conveyed a sense of fun, and used the show's ensemble cast well. James Poniewozik of Time also enjoyed the episode, saying that "Community has become a strong enough and well-enough defined show that the best and funniest things its characters can do is simply talk to one another", and approving of the fact that the episode involved very little "visual pyrotechnics". Like St. James, though, he criticized the flat depiction of Pierce as a pure villain.

HitFix's Alan Sepinwall considered it the inverse of the earlier episode "Abed's Uncontrollable Christmas", depicting what was actually happening instead of what the group was imagining and focusing on jokes over heart. He felt uncertain about how the emotional aspects would work going forward but deemed it one of the show's funniest episodes and "a brilliant comic set piece". Sean Gandert of Paste gave the episode a 9.7 rating, calling it "one of [his] favorite episodes of television, period." He praised the execution of the episode's parody and noted that keeping the show's characters together allowed almost everyone to have great moments. Joshua Kurp of Vulture remarked that every character "brought their A game" and noted that the show's commitment to its premises overshadowed any flaws.

The episode has frequently been ranked among Community's best. In a March 2015 list, Matt Fowler of IGN placed it third and called it "one of the show's greatest, geekiest episodes". Dustin Rowles of Uproxx ranked it seventh and complimented its use of its ensemble. Screen Rant's Lena Wakayama placed it tenth, noting that it worked well even for those unfamiliar with the game. The episode has also been included in lists of Community's top episodes from Variety, Entertainment Weekly, and Den of Geek. Russo and cast member Alison Brie have both cited it as one of their favorite episodes.

== Removal from streaming services ==
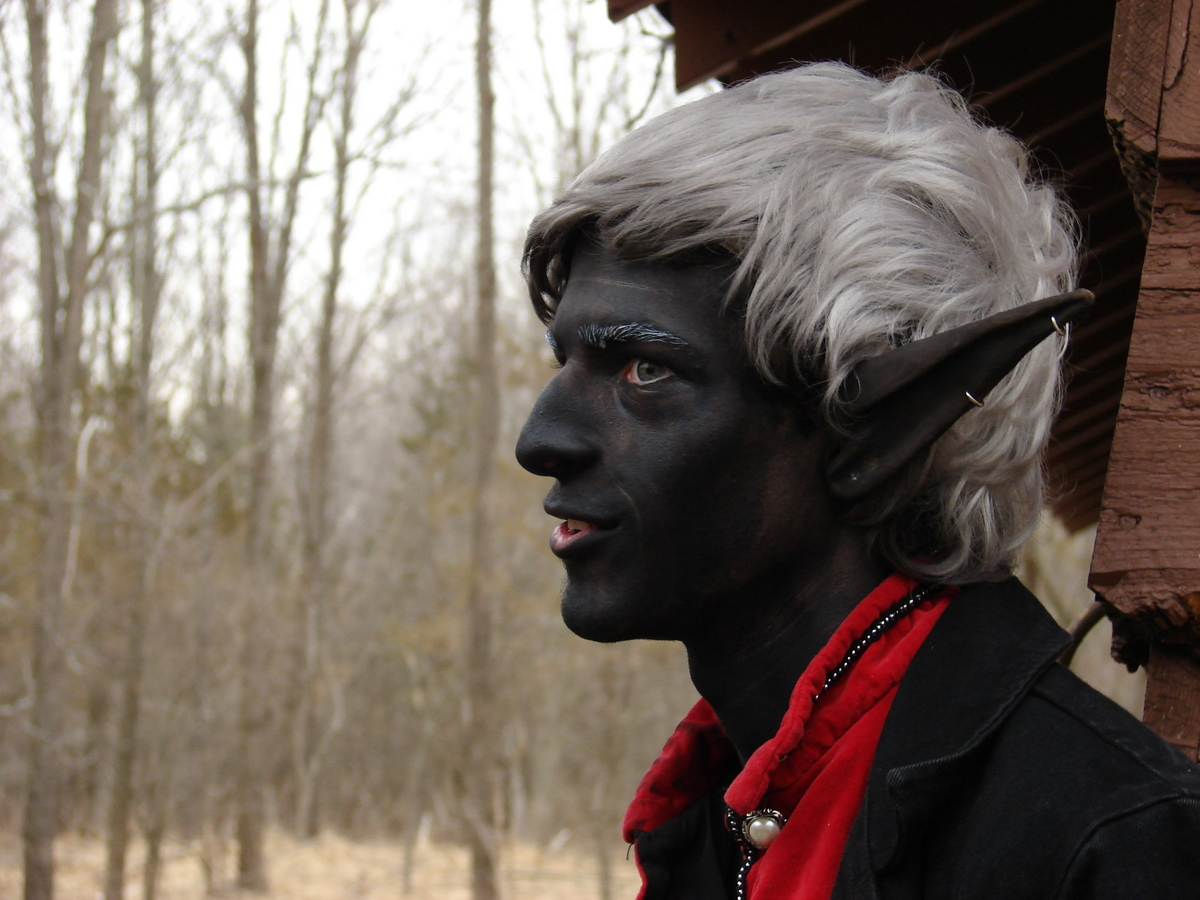
In the episode, Chang wears makeup resembling blackface to portray a dark elf, similar to the person depicted above.

On June 26, 2020, Netflix and Hulu removed the episode from their platforms due to scenes with Chang playing a dark elf by wearing makeup resembling blackface. The episode's removal came in the wake of two other shows – Scrubs and 30 Rock – pulling episodes featuring characters in blackface. A statement from Sony Pictures Television said that the studio supported the decision to remove the episode.

Some commentators found the decision to remove the episode surprising, arguing that it was ambiguous as to whether Chang was actually in blackface and that the removal did a disservice to the episode's focus on the effects of bullying. African-American cast member Yvette Nicole Brown mentioned that it did not seem the joke was understood by those criticizing it, as there was context that in her view made it different from blackface. Harmon did not comment on the episode's removal at the time. In a 2021 interview with The New York Times, Harmon remarked that "justifiably they're stripping it from the streaming archives because it's got a joke about blackface", but felt that the episode "is probably the best episode of Community".

The episode returned to streaming services after Peacock added Community in 2024. Hulu included the episode when the series returned to its service in July 2025.
