= Andrew Guest =

American television writer

Andrew Guest is an American television writer and producer. Notable works includes writing or producing episodes of 30 Rock, Community, Suburgatory, and Brooklyn Nine-Nine. He has worked on series set in the Marvel Cinematic Universe, being a producer on Hawkeye and the showrunner for Wonder Man.

== Career ==
Guest wrote episodes for the series Community including: "Advanced Criminal Law" (2009), "Messianic Myths and Ancient Peoples" (2010), "Romantic Expressionism" (2010), "Advanced Dungeons & Dragons" (2011), and "A Fistful of Paintballs" (2011). He is set to co-write a film, along with series creator Dan Harmon, based on Community for Peacock.

He also was involved with the production of Hawkeye. In 2022, it was announced Guest was hired as head writer for the 2026 Marvel Studios television series Wonder Man, based on the comic book character of the same name.

== Filmography ==
Year	Title	Credited as		Notes
Year	Title	Writer	Producer	Notes
2006	Hope & Faith	Yes	No	Episode: "Faith Knows Squat"; member of production staff
2008	30 Rock	Yes	No	Episode: "Succession"
2008	Do Not Disturb	Yes	No	6 episodes
2009–2011	Community	Yes	No	6 episodes
2011–2014	Suburgatory	Yes	Yes	Wrote 10 episodes
2014–2015	Marry Me	Yes	Executive	Wrote 3 episodes
2015–2019	Brooklyn Nine-Nine	Yes	Consulting	Wrote 6 episodes; co-executive producer on seasons 3, 4, 5, and 6
2019	The Twilight Zone	Yes	No	Episode: "The Wunderkind"
2019	Brockmire	Yes	No	Episode: "Disabled List"
2021	Hawkeye	No	Consulting	
2025	The Fantastic Four: First Steps	Uncredited	No	Additional Literary Material
2026	Wonder Man	Yes	Executive	Showrunner

== Accolades ==
He was nominated for the Writers Guild of America Award for Best Comedic Series at the February 2009 ceremony for his work on the third season of 30 Rock.
