= Epidemiology (Community) =

- Community episode
- Episode no.: Season 2 Episode 6
- Directed by: Anthony Hemingway
- Written by: Karey Dornetto
- Production code: 206
- Original air date: October 28, 2010

Guest appearances
- George Takei as himself/narrator; Jim Rash as Dean Craig Pelton; Greg Cromer as Rich; Richard Erdman as Leonard; Dino Stamatopoulos as Star-Burns; Erik Charles Nielsen as Garrett; Craig Cackowski as Officer Cackowski

Episode chronology
← Previous "Messianic Myths and Ancient Peoples"	Next → "Aerodynamics of Gender"
- Community season 2

"Epidemiology" is the sixth episode of the second season of the American comedy television series Community, and the 31st episode of the series overall. It originally premiered in the United States on NBC on October 28, 2010 as a special Halloween-themed episode. In the episode, the dean throws a Halloween themed party on campus. During the party, a few of the partygoers become sick from eating a hazardous substance that the dean mistook for taco meat bought at an army surplus store. The sickness causes those affected to turn into a violent, zombie-like state that can be passed on through bites. As the study group try to escape, the dean (under orders from U.S. Army Special Operations) locks the doors, trapping them inside with the infected.

The episode was written by Karey Dornetto and directed by Anthony Hemingway, and also features the voice of George Takei. The episode's plot is an homage to various zombie and horror movies, with the infected students mimicking stereotypical zombies and various tropes of the genre. The episode received overwhelmingly positive reviews and was watched by 5.6 million viewers on its original airing.

== Plot ==
Outside the Greendale Community College library, Jeff (Joel McHale), dressed as David Beckham, greets Pierce (Chevy Chase), dressed as Star Trek's Captain Kirk for the annual Greendale Halloween party. The pair walk inside, where all the songs being played are by the 1970's pop group ABBA and Pelton's voice notes to himself, as they are using his iPod for the music. When Pierce asks the dean Craig Pelton (Jim Rash), dressed as Lady Gaga, where he got the food, Jeff reveals it is old military rations bought at a surplus store. Pierce becomes ill, beginning to sweat and becoming disoriented. Annie (Alison Brie) finds Rich (Greg Cromer), the doctor from the beginner pottery class, (Note: As seen in "Beginner Pottery".) and they discover that Pierce is running a fever of 102 °F (38.9 °C). While Troy (Donald Glover) and Abed (Danny Pudi) attempt to court women with their Aliens-inspired costumes, other partygoers begin contracting the mysterious sickness. Although Rich initially assumes it is food poisoning from the rations, Pierce bites Star-Burns (Dino Stamatopoulos) on the arm.

The main characters (except Pierce) continue to enjoy the party, despite noticing that many of those attending the event appeared to be on drugs. Troy, who has by this time changed out of his science-fiction style costume and opted to dress as a "sexy Dracula", calls Abed a nerd, hurting his feelings. Meanwhile, at his office, the dean calls the surplus store to complain. When he reads a code from a biohazard-labeled package he mistook for taco meat, he is transferred to an special operations officer, who orders him to quarantine those inside the library and wait until the Army arrives in six hours.

At the party, Leonard (Richard Erdman) savagely bites a woman, and Troy and Abed believe that they are in the midst of a zombie attack. As the unaffected partygoers try to escape through the library's front door, the dean locks it from the outside and seals them in with the zombies. The remaining survivors barricade themselves in the group's study room.

Rich explains that the zombies, who are actually still living people, are suffering from a rabies-like illness and will suffer brain damage and death within six hours. Annie and Rich suggest lowering the building temperature to lower the zombies' fever and kill the virus. However, the thermostat is outside with the zombies. Rich emphasizes that everyone disclose whether they were bitten, even though he and Britta have covered up their bites. When they begin exhibiting symptoms, Chang (Ken Jeong) throws an ice skate at them to knock them out but ends up breaking a window, allowing the zombies to surge in and grab Annie.

The group flees the study room and splits up. Shirley (Yvette Nicole Brown) and Chang escape to a nearby bathroom, where they share a passionate moment and have sex. Jeff, Troy, and Abed get to the library's basement, where they spot a window. Jeff, not wanting his expensive suit to get dirty by going through the window, opens a door instead, letting in the zombies from the other side and getting overpowered. Abed encourages Troy to "be the first black man to make it to the end" and sacrifices himself, allowing Troy to escape through the window.

Once outside, Troy forcibly takes the keys from the dean and re-enters the building to get to the thermostat. Abed, Britta, and Shirley bite Troy, but he is able to reach the thermostat before being affected. After the air conditioning comes on, everyone is healed. The Army arrives to "disinfect" the building and ensure that the dean is the "only witness". Upon discovering those inside are uninfected, they opt to erase everyone's memories. In the aftermath, the party-goers assume the drinks were roofied.

In the end tag, Troy listens to a voicemail message from Chang sent moments before he is infected, bragging that he and Shirley had sex. Troy wonders aloud why Chang called him.

== Production ==
The episode was written by producer Karey Dornetto, her third writing credit on the series. It was directed by Anthony Hemingway, his first directing credit for a half-hour comedy series. He has previously directed episodes for The Wire, Battlestar Galactica, CSI: NY, and True Blood.

The following songs by the Swedish pop music group ABBA are featured throughout the episode: "Waterloo", "SOS", "Dancing Queen", "Gimme! Gimme! Gimme! (A Man After Midnight)", "Mamma Mia", and "Fernando".

This episode featured a special Halloween-themed opening credit sequence, unique to this episode. Series creator Dan Harmon later stated on his Twitter account that he paid for the changed opening credits himself, as it wasn't in the network's budget.

== Reception ==
In its original American broadcast, "Epidemiology" reached approximately 5.635 million households with a 2.4 rating/7% share in the 18–49 demographic. It was the least-watched non-reality component of NBC's Comedy Night Done Right for that evening (only The Apprentice, a reality show, scored lower).

Alyssa Rosenberg from The Atlantic praised the episode, saying, "Community's on a roll with episodes torn straight from the reels of classic movies this season, and last night's Halloween episode lifted the show to new heights: this may have been the best half-hour of Community since "Contemporary American Poultry" and "Modern Warfare." Sean Gandert of Paste Magazine also found the episode to be one of the series' best, writing, "Community gets things so, so right. This is one of those special episodes that really pushed the boundaries of the show, and honestly, I even preferred it to 'Modern Warfare'—this may be the best episode of the show so far."
