= Modern Warfare (Community) =

- Community episode
- Episode no.: Season 1 Episode 23
- Directed by: Justin Lin
- Written by: Emily Cutler
- Production code: 119
- Original air date: May 6, 2010

Guest appearances
- Jim Rash as Dean Craig Pelton; Dino Stamatopoulos as Star-Burns; Richard Erdman as Leonard; Erik Charles Nielsen as Garrett

Episode chronology
← Previous "The Art of Discourse"	Next → "English as a Second Language"
- Community season 1

"Modern Warfare" is the twenty-third episode of the first season of Community and originally premiered on May 6, 2010, on NBC. In the episode, after the Dean announces the prize for a friendly game of paintball, Greendale sinks into a state of all-out paintball war, with every student battling for supremacy. During the chaos, Jeff's study group teams up in order to last longer in the game. Meanwhile, Jeff and Britta confront their unresolved sexual tension.

The episode was written by Emily Cutler and directed by Justin Lin. The episode's plot is a pastiche of multiple action movies, such as Battle Royale, Pitch Black, The Matrix, Die Hard, Terminator, 28 Days Later, The Warriors, Rambo, Predator, and the films of John Carpenter and John Woo. The episode came third in its timeslot and received universal critical acclaim from critics praising its writing, direction, and performances; it is often ranked among the show's greatest episodes. Two paintball sequels followed this episode: the two-part season 2 finale ("A Fistful of Paintballs" and "For a Few Paintballs More"), and season 6's "Modern Espionage".

== Plot ==
Jeff (Joel McHale) and Britta (Gillian Jacobs) enter the study room arguing. The rest of the study group complains, and Abed (Danny Pudi) explains that Jeff and Britta's sexual tension is dividing the group. Dean Pelton (Jim Rash) announces a game of "Paintball Assassin" with a prize to be determined. Jeff leaves to nap in his car. An hour later, he awakens to a seemingly abandoned campus with paint everywhere. Inside, Leonard (Richard Erdman) attacks Jeff with paintballs. Jeff flees and runs into Abed, who shoots Leonard.

Abed takes Jeff to the base he shares with Troy (Donald Glover). Abed and Troy explain that the prize—priority registration for classes next semester—caused the game to escalate into an all-out conflict. While they realize only one person can ultimately win, they convince Jeff to join them in order to stay in the game longer by working together. After eliminating the chess team, the three run into Pierce (Chevy Chase) and Star-Burns (Dino Stamatopoulos). Pierce eagerly betrays Star-Burns and joins them. Jeff, Troy, and Abed take a bathroom break but find themselves in a trap set by Britta, Shirley (Yvette Nicole Brown), and Annie (Alison Brie), who have joined forces. Caught in a Mexican stand-off, Abed insists that all seven of them should work together. The group, newly unified, heads outside, where the glee club attacks and shoots Troy, Annie, and Pierce before being shot by the other group members. The four survivors return to the cafeteria. Shirley says she would use priority registration to take morning classes and spend more time with her sons. Britta proposes that the winner should give the prize to Shirley. Jeff calls Britta phony for her proposal, but before they can keep arguing, the four are attacked by disco-themed roller skaters. The study group wins, but Shirley and Abed are eliminated, while Jeff is injured and starts bleeding.

In the study room, Britta bandages Jeff's injury, and they each acknowledge each other's good sides. In the heat of the moment (and to serve the rest of the group right), they have sex there, relieving their tension. Afterwards, Britta unsuccessfully tries to betray Jeff before Señor Chang (Ken Jeong)—employed by the Dean to take out any remaining students—barges into the room. Britta sacrifices herself to eliminate Chang, who reveals there is no priority registration and triggers several paint bombs strapped to his chest. Jeff narrowly escapes the blast and heads for the Dean's office. Outraged, he forces the Dean to give him priority registration. Later, Britta and Jeff agree to pretend they didn't hook up, which is almost foiled by Abed's insistence that something has changed. Jeff gives the priority registration form to Shirley, surprising Britta.

== Production ==
The episode was written by Emily Cutler and directed by Justin Lin, his third directing credit for the season and series.

== Cultural references ==
The episode is an affectionate parody of such action movies as Die Hard, Terminator 2, The Matrix, Rambo, Scarface, The Warriors, Hard Boiled, and Battle Royale.

In addition, Abed comments that Jeff and Britta's relationship lacks the heart and soul of Ross Geller and Rachel Green's relationship from the television series Friends, and that of Sam Malone and Diane Chambers from Cheers.

In the scene where Chang and Dean are in the office at 2am, Chang was holding a stuffed toy while sitting cross-legged. This is a nod to the winner Mai in Battle Royale, who appeared bloody but smiling while holding a stuffed toy after winning the Battle Royale.

Chang's entry into the fight is reminiscent of Scarface, and his "self-destruct" is similar to the Predator's demise at the end of the film Predator. The opening scene refers to 28 Days Later.

When the roller-skating-disco-junkies come and attack the group, Shirley makes a little speech, inspired by Eli's quote just before a fight scene from The Book of Eli. She is shot by a girl from behind before finishing it. Jeff refers to the first disco fan as Disco Stu, a character from The Simpsons. Disco Stu's chant of "Come out to play-yay" is a reference to the final scene from The Warriors, when Luther taunts the Warriors at Coney Island.

Jeff's line "Uh-oh. No paintballs, Hans? What do you think, I’m stupid?" is a direct reference to Die Hard, when John McClane says "Ooops, no bullets. What do you think, I’m fucking stupid, Hans?"

== Reception ==
"Modern Warfare" first aired on NBC on May 6, 2010. In its original American broadcast, the episode was viewed by an estimated 4.35 million viewers, and it scored a 2.0 rating in the 18- to 49-year-old demographic according to Nielsen (Nielsen ratings are audience measurement systems that determine the audience size and composition of television programming in the United States); this means that 2.0 percent of all households with viewers aged 18 to 49 years old were watching television at the time of the episodes' airing.

The episode received much acclaim from critics. Jonah Krakow of IGN gave the episode a 9.7 out 10, calling it "Incredible," and also stated: "Most sitcoms don't have as many water-cooler moments as serialized adventure shows like Lost or 24, but I know this episode of Community will be an exception." Emily VanDerWerff of The A.V. Club gave the episode an A and called it "one of the best episodes of TV of the season", praising it for feeling "both very funny and very serious" and for including strong character moments. Jason Hughes gave the episode a positive review, noting that "like most action movies, there isn't a whole lot more to say about the plot. But, like action movies, it was a hell of a lot of fun to watch it all go down." Sean Gandert of Paste gave the episode a 9.1/10, calling it "phenomenal" and describing it as within "spitting distance" of being the best episode of the season.

TIME critic James Poniewozik named "Modern Warfare" the third best TV episode of 2010, writing "A lot of sitcoms can make you laugh. It's a rare one that can so fully share the sense of joy its cast, writers and crew have in making the show." For his work on the episode, Lin was nominated for an NAACP Image Award for Outstanding Directing in a Comedy Series.

In TV.com's ranking of all 110 episodes of the series, they placed the episode third overall, and wrote "one of the purest expressions of genre appreciation and compact sitcom storytelling that we've seen on broadcast TV in the 21st century." Chancellor Agard of Entertainment Weekly also ranked it as the show's third-best episode, noting it "set the bar for all the great Community genre parodies that followed", while Jordan Moreau of Variety included it in his list of the show's 12 best episodes.

== Sequels ==
"Modern Warfare" was the first of several Community episodes centered around paintball.

The second season features paintball in "A Fistful of Paintballs" and "For a Few Paintballs More", which served as the two-part finale of the season. The first part paid homage Western films, particularly Spaghetti Westerns, and the second was an homage to Star Wars. Both were well received by critics.

The finale of the fourth season, "Advanced Introduction to Finality", sees the study group face off against the evil versions of themselves in a paintball match.

The sixth-season episode "Modern Espionage" focuses on an underground paintball match in an homage to spy films; it also received strongly positive reviews.

The third and fifth seasons do not feature paintball episodes, but the third-season episode "Curriculum Unavailable" features a fake flashback to a paintball match with a gangster film theme. Some critics noted that the fifth-season episode "Geothermal Escapism", which features a school-wide match of "Hot Lava", had a similar spirit to the paintball episodes.
