= Hollywood.com =

US entertainment news website

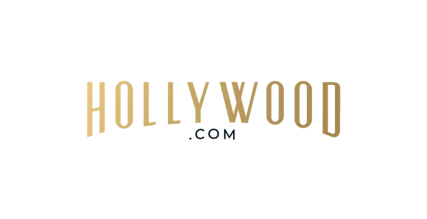
- Current logo
- Website type: Entertainment
- Available in: English
- Founded: September 30, 1995; 31 years ago
- Headquarters: Boca Raton, Florida, United States
- Owners: Hollywood.com, LLC
- Website: hollywood.com

Hollywood.com is an entertainment news website covering popular culture topics including movies, television, music and celebrities. Hollywood.com is principally owned by Mitchell Rubenstein and Laurie S. Silvers, who previously founded Sci-Fi Channel (now Syfy).

== History ==
Hollywood.com was launched in the 1990s and was bought and operated by Times Mirror Company in 1996. Times Mirror used the site as the entertainment section of its Los Angeles Times website and newspaper.

An affiliate of Rubenstein and Silvers purchased the website in May 1999. In partnership with the National Association of Theatre Owners and most movie theater chains, Hollywood.com became the first website to display online listings for movie showtimes nationally.

In 2009, Hollywood Media Corp. sold Hollywood.com and Hollywood.com Television to R&S Investments, LLC, owned by Mitchell Rubenstein and Laurie S. Silvers.

Today, Hollywood.com features content including movie trailers, interviews, red carpet photo galleries and entertainment news stories.

Rubenstein and Silvers also founded MovieTickets.com which was sold to Fandango Media in 2017.

In 2000, 35 of the 50 employees at the site's Santa Monica office were laid off in an effort to strategically consolidate and focus operations on the company's headquarters in Boca Raton, Florida. Laurie S. Silvers and Mitchell Rubenstein, the majority shareholders of parent company Project Hollywood, purchased Baseline StudioSystems, an online database and research service on the film and television industries, from The New York Times Company in 2011. In 2014, they sold Baseline to Gracenote, a subsidiary of Tribune Media.

In 2023, Hollywood.com acquired Dance Media (parent of Dance Magazine and Pointe).
