= Erik Charles Nielsen =

American actor and comedian (born 1981)

- Born: May 8, 1981 (age 45); West Sayville, New York, U.S.
- Education: Boston University
- Occupations: Actor; Comedian
- Years active: 2007–present

Erik Charles Nielsen (born May 8, 1981) is an American actor and comedian.

== Early life ==
Nielsen was born in West Sayville, New York. He is of Danish descent. Nielsen graduated from Palm Bay High School in 1999. While attending Boston University, he was named the funniest comedian on campus. After continuing to hone his act at The Comedy Studio in Cambridge, Massachusetts, he moved to Los Angeles, California to do a Ph.D. program at the University of California, Los Angeles, but withdrew before completion. Turning to comedy full-time, he got his first big break at the 2007 U.S. Comedy Arts Festival in Aspen, Colorado.

== Career ==
Nielsen is best known for his recurring role as Garrett Lambert in the television comedy series Community from 2009 to 2015. His other acting credits include Bad Milo (2013) and the pilot episode of IFC's Maron. He also starred in Erik the Librarian, a web series created by Brent Forrester.

Nielsen has appeared on Just for Laughs, Conan, and on HBO Canada's stand-up series Funny as Hell.

On December 10, 2014, he appeared on Ken Reid's TV Guidance Counselor Podcast.

Nielsen appeared as a contestant on Jeopardy! on September 25, 2025. On December 15, he returned to Jeopardy! for the Second Chance Tournament.

== Filmography ==
=== Film ===
Year	Title	Character	Notes
2013	Bad Milo	Allistair	

=== Television ===
Year	Title	Character	Notes
2007	iThunes		TV mini-series
2008	Comedy Gumbo		Episode: "Smooth Taste"
2008	History of the Joke	Himself	TV movie documentary
2009–2015	Community	Garrett Lambert	43 episodes
2010	Tim and Eric Awesome Show, Great Job!	Merv Paynus	Episode: "Crows"
2011	Talking Hedz		Short
2012	Small Business	Kevin Middlewater	TV movie
2013	Maron	Darryl	Episode: "Internet Troll"
2013	Conan	Himself	Comic Guest
2014	Crazy House		TV movie
2014	The Muffs: Weird Boy Next Door	Weird Boy Next Door	Short
2015	The Middle	Wizard	Episode: "Flirting With Disaster"
2016	Another Period	John John	2 episodes
2017	Dr. Ken	Student	Episode: "Ken's Big Audition"
2019	Corporate	Rick	Episode: "Vacation"
2023	Krapopolis	Scott, additional voices	Recurring role
2025	Jeopardy!	Himself	Contestant, 2 episodes
