= Basic Lupine Urology =

- Community episode
- Episode no.: Season 3 Episode 17
- Directed by: Rob Schrab
- Written by: Megan Ganz
- Production code: 317
- Original air date: April 26, 2012

Guest appearances
- Michael Ironside as Colonel Archwood; Michael K. Williams as Professor Kane; Leslie Hendrix as botanist; David Neher as Todd; Richard Erdman as Leonard; Charley Koontz as Neil; Jerry Minor as Jerry; Eddie Pepitone as Crazy Schmidt; Dino Stamatopoulos as Star-Burns; Luke Youngblood as Magnitude; Erik Charles Nielsen as Garrett; Danielle Kaplowitz as Vicki; Marcy McCusker as Quendra

Episode chronology
← Previous "Virtual Systems Analysis"	Next → "Course Listing Unavailable"
- Community season 3

"Basic Lupine Urology" is the 17th episode of the third season of the American comedy television series Community and the 66th episode overall. It was written by Megan Ganz and directed by Rob Schrab. It originally aired in the United States on April 26, 2012, on NBC. In the episode, the study group must figure out who killed the yam they were growing for a biology class project. Troy and Abed lead the investigation and track down suspects, while Jeff and Annie work to build a case against whoever did it. As they dig deeper, the group encounters several challenges that threaten to derail their case.

Overall, the episode parodies the television series Law & Order, with the main and supporting cast members representing the detectives, prosecutors, and other figures seen on the show. Many stylistic elements and plot points used in the episode take direct inspiration from the series. The episode also features guest appearances by Michael Ironside, Michael K. Williams, and Leslie Hendrix, among others. In its original broadcast, it was seen by 3.21 million viewers and received acclaim from critics, with much of the praise going to the show's execution of the format. It is often ranked among Community's best episodes.

== Plot ==
The study group finds their yam for a biology project smashed on the ground. Annie (Alison Brie) seeks an A for their work; Professor Kane (Michael K. Williams) demands proof that someone "murdered" the yam. Troy (Donald Glover) and Abed (Danny Pudi) question Pierce (Chevy Chase), who could not enter the biology room to water the yam because the door was locked. Pierce suggests Todd (David Neher) may have had a motive for killing the yam. Troy and Abed find Todd with a burn on his hand; Todd tries to show he also got to the room too late. Troy and Abed meet Neil (Charley Koontz), who handles the keys, and eventually trace the room's key to Star-Burns (Dino Stamatopoulos). However, interrogating Star-Burns yields little. Elsewhere, a botanist (Leslie Hendrix) indicates that someone likely stepped on the yam.

Seeking evidence, Jeff (Joel McHale) orders a search of Star-Burns's locker. Inside, Troy and Abed find biology lab equipment. They corner Star-Burns, who admits to stealing the equipment and leaving the door unlocked, allowing Todd to enter. Star-Burns agrees to testify against Todd in exchange for immunity regarding his theft. Todd is apprehended, and Jeff and Annie present the case against him to Kane. Lt. Col. Archwood (Michael Ironside), Todd's former commander, suddenly arrives and demands an explanation for Todd's predicament. Kane allows each side to present their case to the class. However, as Jeff and Annie prepare, they learn Archwood has scared off Star-Burns from testifying.

In class, Archwood presents Todd as a hero, but under Annie's cross-examination, Todd cracks. He reveals he picked up the yam to examine it and dropped it when the jar burned him. Jeff pulls Kane and Annie aside and asks for a C for Todd and the group, reasoning that Todd's confession does not show guilt. Before Kane announces the deal, though, Jeff realizes the class's yams were all given boiling water, killing them. He proves this by dropping the boiled yams, producing the appearance of being stepped on. When Vicki's (Danielle Kaplowitz) yam does not splatter, Neil suddenly confesses to killing the other yams to skew the grading curve, as Vicki was struggling and he wanted her to pass. Neil loses his status with the keys and agrees to retake biology. Afterwards, Jeff and Annie celebrate with Kane and Dean Pelton (Jim Rash) until they learn Star-Burns has died in a car crash.

== Production ==
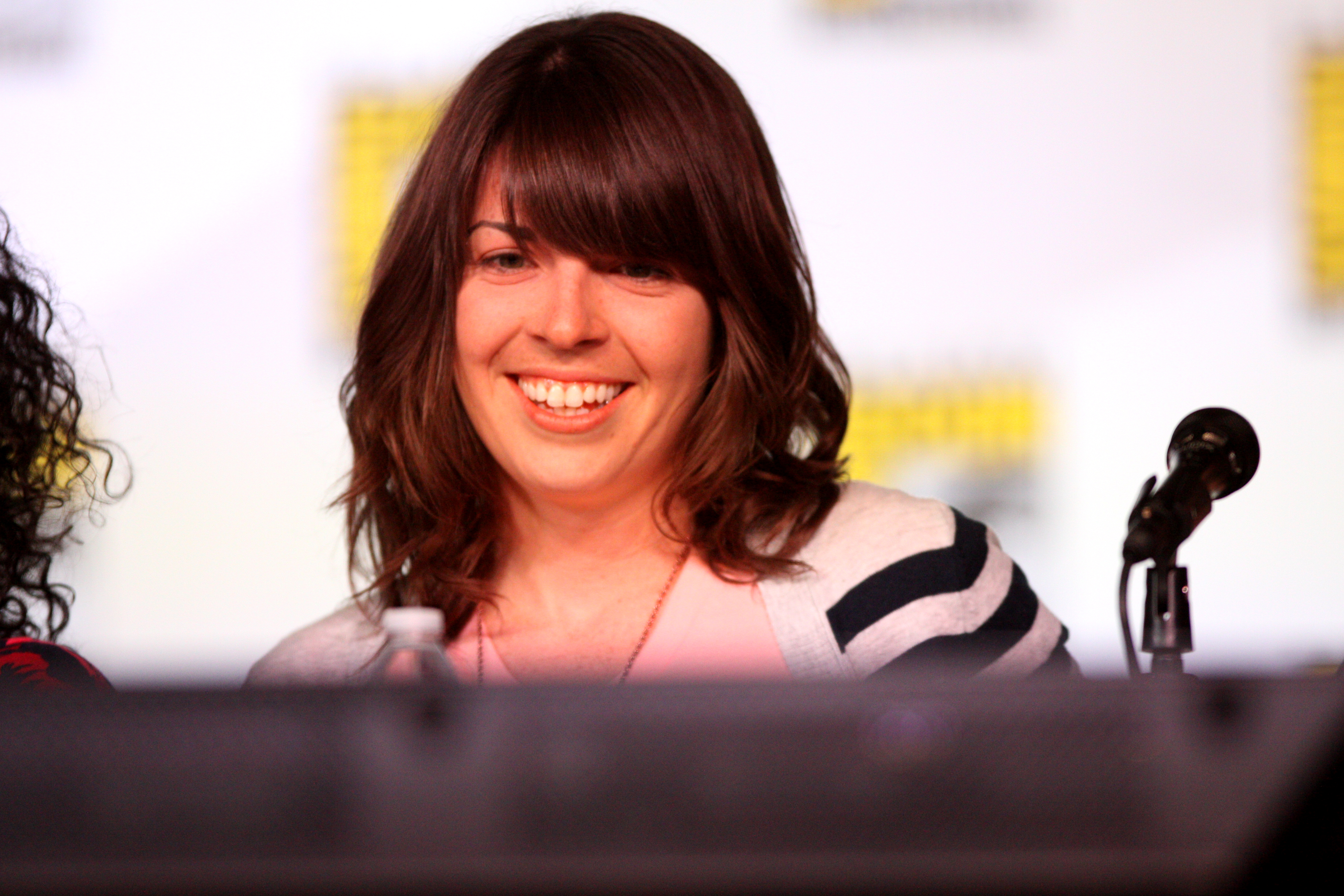
Megan Ganz, writer of the episode

"Basic Lupine Urology" was written by Megan Ganz, her fourth writing credit for the show. It was directed by Rob Schrab in his directing debut for Community; Schrab had worked with series creator Dan Harmon on several other projects before joining the series.

In January 2012, while Community was on hiatus during its third season, it was announced that the series would feature an episode paying homage to the television series Law & Order. The episode follows the general formula of a Law & Order episode, with a cold open leading into an investigation followed by a trial. Within the episode, Troy and Abed fill the role of the cops or detectives and were likened to Lennie Briscoe and Mike Logan by some critics. Jeff and Annie serve as the prosecutors, with Jeff compared to Jack McCoy and Annie as "the attractive deputy DA". Shirley (Yvette Nicole Brown) was likened to Lt. Anita Van Buren, while Pierce serves as a crooked informant. Britta (Gillian Jacobs) makes a brief appearance as a crime technician, Chang (Ken Jeong) serves as the bailiff in the trial, and Dean Pelton represents the district attorney.

The show created a Law & Order-styled title sequence for the episode that incorporated still photographs of the show's characters. The episode replaced its usual theme song with an electric piano-based version to create a similar sound to the Law & Order theme. The episode includes several other references to Law & Order's format and style, including a one-liner or "zinger" to end the cold open and a last-second shock to leave a downer ending. The title "Basic Lupine Urology" is itself a play on Dick Wolf, the creator of Law & Order. Wolf is given a "special thanks" credit at the end of the episode.

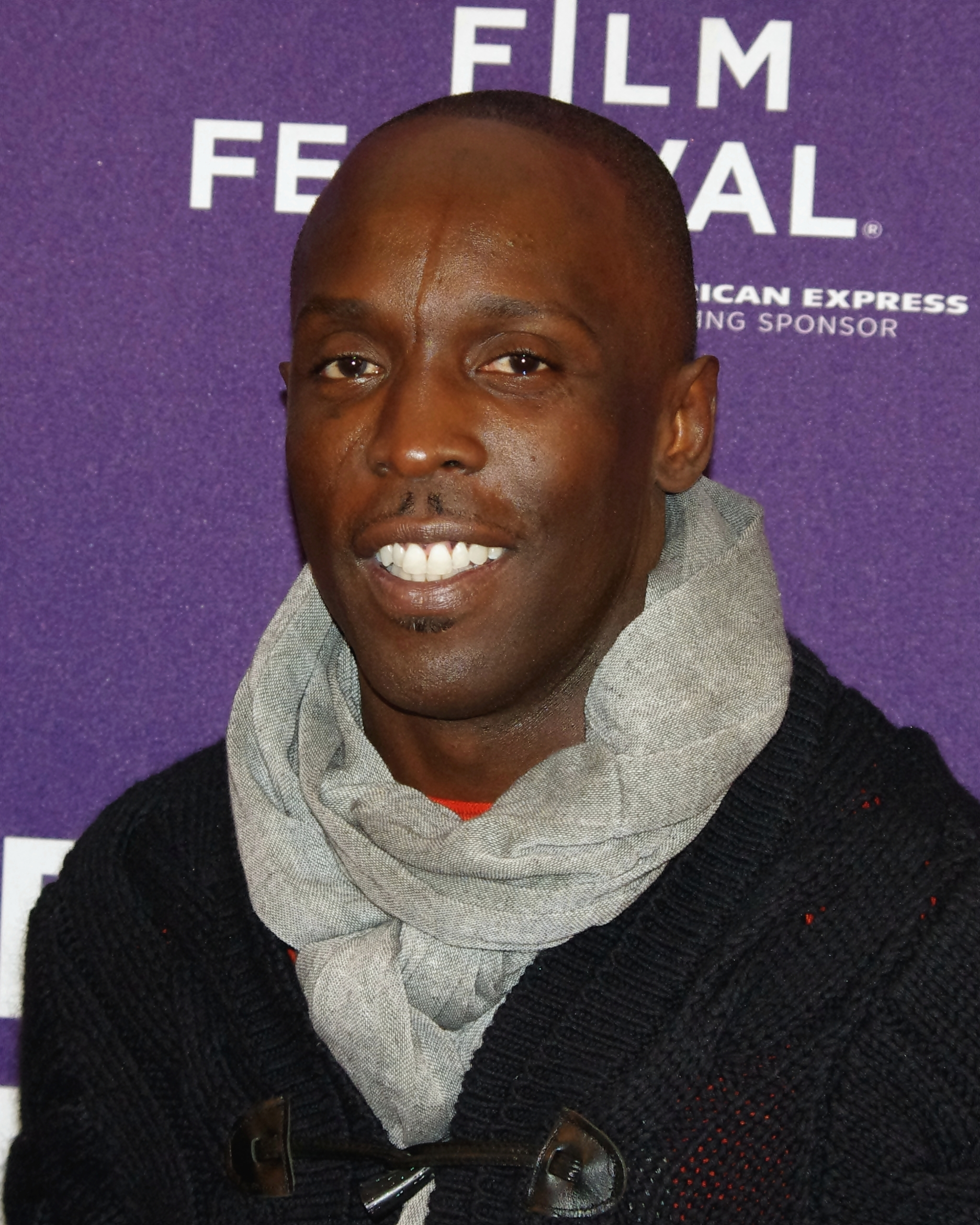
Michael K. Williams makes his third guest appearance as Professor Kane in the episode.

Leslie Hendrix, who played medical examiner Dr. Elizabeth Rodgers in Law & Order and several of its spin-offs, makes a cameo as a botanist in the episode. Michael K. Williams makes his third appearance on the show as Professor Kane, who fills the role of the judge; Williams also guest-starred on Law & Order. In the episode, Williams alludes to his role as Omar Little on The Wire when he remarks, "A man's gotta have a code." Michael Ironside makes his sole appearance on the show as Colonel Archwood, a military lawyer.

The death of Star-Burns was written into the show at actor Dino Stamatopoulos's request. Stamatopoulos, who also served as a consulting producer and writer for the show and did not particularly enjoy the challenges of acting, asked to be written off the show to allow him to focus on his behind-the-scenes roles. The scene was not included in screeners sent to critics before the episode's airing to prevent spoilers from leaking. Star-Burns's death went on to play a major role in the events of the next episode, "Course Listing Unavailable". The season finale, "Introduction to Finality", revealed that Star-Burns actually survived, and the character made a full return in the fifth-season episode "Basic Intergluteal Numismatics".

== Reception ==
=== Ratings ===
In its initial broadcast, "Basic Lupine Urology" was seen by 3.21 million American viewers and received a 1.4 rating in the 18–49 demographic. This placed the show fourth in total viewership in its time slot, behind American Idol, The Big Bang Theory, and Missing, but marked a slight uptick from the previous episode. After factoring in seven-day DVR viewership, the episode rose to a 2.1 rating among adults 18–49.

=== Reviews ===
The episode received critical acclaim upon its release, including a 10/10 rating from IGN, an A− grade from The A.V. Club, and a 9.2 rating from Paste. Many critics praised the show for its execution of the format and for recreating the feel and rhythms of a Law & Order episode within the show's universe. Bill Wyman of Slate went so far as to deem it a better police procedural than any Law & Order episode, commenting that it is "better plotted, more engrossing, has better surprises, cuts deeper, and says more about the human condition." Despite this, several critics remarked that the episode still worked well even if the audience did not recognize many of the references.

Another aspect of the episode that was praised was that it simply had fun with the characters and premise instead of taking itself too seriously. Both Sean Gandert of Paste and Alan Sepinwall of HitFix remarked in their reviews that the episode lacked a serious emotional story or character arc, though neither thought that was a major problem. Similarly, Joshua Kurp of Vulture appreciated that the show moved away from the overly sentimental plots of the previous few episodes while keeping the characters true to their personalities. Other aspects of the episode that received praise were the appearances by Ironside and Williams and the way the main and supporting cast members were able to aptly fill their new roles. The show later received a nomination for Best Sitcom at the 2013 Banff Rockie Awards for the episode.

The episode is frequently listed as one of the show's best in retrospective rankings. Entertainment Weekly named it the fourth-best episode of the show and the second-best of the season behind "Remedial Chaos Theory", citing its commitment to the premise. Screen Rant placed it sixth in their rankings, while Uproxx placed it fifth in their rankings and noted its quality as a stand-alone episode. Uproxx also named it as one of the ten funniest television episodes of 2012.
