= Horror Fiction in Seven Spooky Steps =

- Community episode
- Episode no.: Season 3 Episode 5
- Directed by: Tristram Shapeero
- Written by: Dan Harmon
- Production code: 305
- Original air date: October 27, 2011

Episode chronology
← Previous "Remedial Chaos Theory"	Next → "Advanced Gay"
- Community season 3

"Horror Fiction in Seven Spooky Steps" is the fifth episode of the third season of the U.S. television series Community. It first aired on October 27, 2011 on NBC and is the series' 2011 Halloween episode.

In the episode, Britta is led to believe that one member of the group is a psychopath and is determined to find out who it is. Though her plan was to gauge the reaction of the other characters after telling them a horror story, all the other characters end up telling stories of their own. Each story illustrates how each character views each other and themselves. The episode is also notable for paying off the series' Beetlejuice gag, in a character uttering the name "Beetlejuice" and the character of Betelgeuse himself then walking by, after the name was previously uttered in the episodes "Communication Studies" and "Cooperative Calligraphy"; in the self-titled 1988 film, animated series, and musical, the character would suddenly enter the scene whenever someone said his name three times.

The episode was written by series creator Dan Harmon and directed by Tristram Shapeero. It received positive reviews from critics.

== Plot ==
Britta's (Gillian Jacobs) anonymous personality tests (Note: As seen in "Competitive Ecology".) indicate that one study group member is deeply disturbed and homicidal. She tries to identify the individual by observing the group's reactions to a horror story. In her story, a couple, played by herself and Jeff (Joel McHale), makes out in a car until an escaped psychopath attacks. Abed (Danny Pudi) criticizes the story as cliched and offers an improved version. The group proceeds to tell their own "horror" stories, all taking place in a cabin.

In Abed's story, he and Britta visit a secluded cabin. Abed takes every logical precaution, such as bringing a radio and awaiting the escaped psychopath by standing back-to-back holding knives, boring everyone. In Annie's (Alison Brie) romantic story, she is a schoolteacher who tames Jeff, a vampire, by teaching him how to read. When Jeff turns on Annie, she reveals herself to be a werewolf and mutilates him, horrifying the group. In Troy's (Donald Glover) story, he and Abed are fighter pilots who encounter a crazed doctor, Pierce (Chevy Chase), who sews them together. However, this gives Troy and Abed psychokinetic powers, with which they knock Pierce unconscious. As revenge, they sew Pierce's buttocks to his chest and swap his hands and feet, creeping out the group. In Pierce's story, he is a stud surrounded by sultry versions of Annie, Shirley (Yvette Nicole Brown), and Britta. When Abed and Troy, as stereotypical hood film characters, invade his home, Pierce easily subdues them, baffling the group. In Shirley's story, the Rapture occurs while the other group members party and use drugs. The Devil, portrayed by Dean Pelton (Jim Rash), enters, but Shirley holds him off temporarily before rising to Heaven, leaving the others to be tortured, offending the group.

Bored, the group tries to leave. Britta stops them by revealing the test results and explaining how the disturbed individual could kill them. Her gruesome descriptions and the flickering lights create alarm. To calm everyone down, Jeff tells a story wherein a hookman attacks the group. After being questioned by Jeff, the hookman reveals himself to be Chang (Ken Jeong) and asks for a hug, and the group accepts him warmly. Jeff's story, however, fails to calm his friends, as they think he's trying to divert attention away from himself. Jeff admits he filled out his test paper randomly, frustrating the group. Annie checks the papers and realizes Britta scanned them upside down. The corrected results reveal that every group member except one is crazy. The group decides not to determine who it is so they can each hope they are the sane one. The final shot reveals that Abed was the one member of the group who tested as sane.

== Production ==
The episode was written by series creator and executive producer Dan Harmon, his fourth writing credit. It was directed by Tristram Shapeero, his fifth directing credit.

"Horror Fiction in Seven Spooky Steps" was—unintentionally—the second episode in a row to feature seven different stories, after "Remedial Chaos Theory." "Chaos" was intended to be the third episode of the season, but was pushed back to fourth after "Competitive Ecology" due to production delays.

Abed's story features an excerpt from the song "Daybreak" by Michael Haggins. The song would become a recurring feature in later episodes of the show, starting with "Foosball and Nocturnal Vigilantism".

== Themes ==
The episode examines how each character in the study group views each other and themselves, filtering everybody else through the point of view of one character.

Britta always means well, but makes everything boring because she does not read her audience well. Abed makes his story boring by trying too hard to be realistic. Annie deals with her insecurities of Jeff and Britta's sexual relationship by casting Jeff as a vampire using Britta for sustenance, when only she can touch his heart. Troy values his friendship with Abed, while Pierce is overly confident in himself. Shirley sees herself as devout while pitying the rest of the group for being godless people. Jeff believes he can talk the group out of any problem and considers himself the only normal person.

== Cultural references ==
The episode examines hookman and slasher stories. In Abed's story, he fixes all plot holes by having his characters take all logical precautions to minimize the chance of being killed.

Annie's imagining of Jeff as a vampire who uses Britta for sustenance is a poke at the Twilight series. The scene where Annie teaches Jeff to read is reminiscent of a similar scene in Beauty and the Beast.

Shirley's story involves the Rapture, wherein she goes to heaven, leaving behind the rest of the group, whom she perceives as hedonistic. Also in her story is Dean Pelton as the Devil with a chainsaw yelling "Gay marriage!"

At the start of the episode, Annie goes through Britta's playlist and finds the Beetlejuice soundtrack in it. Beetlejuice (portrayed by an uncredited extra) then saunters past the screen behind Annie as she says the name aloud for the third time in the show's history ("Beetlejuice" was first mentioned in "Communication Studies" by Professor Slater and second mentioned in "Cooperative Calligraphy" by Britta). In the film, whenever someone says "Beetlejuice" three times, the character Betelgeuse would suddenly enter the scene.

Abed is dressed-up as Inspector Spacetime, the show's interpretation of Doctor Who.

Jeff dresses up for Halloween by wearing a "Fast and the Furious jacket."

At one point Troy wants to go the party because he heard the Dean has "free taco meat from the Army". This is a reference to the second-season episode "Epidemiology" in which army surplus food the Dean acquired gave people zombie-like attributes.

As Britta explains that an untreated psychopath could murder anyone in the group, her murder is portrayed while she is reading "Warren Piece."

== Reception ==
=== Ratings ===
In its original broadcast on October 27, 2011, the episode was watched by an estimated 3.42 million people. It drew a Nielsen rating/share of 1.4/4 in the 18–49 demographic.

=== Reviews ===
"Horror Fiction in Seven Spooky Steps" received generally positive critical reviews.

Leigh Raines of TV Fanatic gave the episode a 4.5/5 rating, saying: "Community always serves up great holiday episodes, so it came as no surprise that I loved "Horror Fiction In Seven Spooky Steps." For Kelsea Stahler of Hollywood.com, the episode worked "because each of these stories is so perfectly tailored to our character’s psyches and personalities... As an episode, it was a little winding and erratic, but as something stalwart Community fans can enjoy, it was a solid hit."

Alan Sepinwall and Emily VanDerWerff both said that "Horror Fiction" is a strong episode on its own, but lamented the fact that it aired right after "Remedial Chaos Theory," which had a similar episode structure which combines seven different stories. VanDerWerff said the episode was "pretty much just unadulterated awesome." Sepinwall said "'Chaos Theory' was an awfully tough act to follow: a gimmick episode that was both incredibly funny while telling us important things about these characters and how they relate to each other. And I enjoyed 'Horror Fiction' a lot, but it's a gimmick episode that's mainly just funny, while reminding us of things we know pretty well about the characters.
