= Virtual Systems Analysis =

- Community episode
- Episode no.: Season 3 Episode 16
- Directed by: Tristram Shapeero
- Written by: Matt Murray
- Production code: 316
- Original air date: April 19, 2012

Guest appearances
- Richard Erdman as Leonard; James Kirkland as manager

Episode chronology
← Previous "Origins of Vampire Mythology"	Next → "Basic Lupine Urology"
- Community season 3

"Virtual Systems Analysis" is the sixteenth episode of the third season of the American television series Community. It originally aired on April 19, 2012, on NBC. In the episode, Annie and Abed spend time in their apartment's "Dreamatorium" simulating adventures together, but Abed turns it into a personal exploration of the group's dynamics.

== Plot ==
When the study group takes a break, Annie (Alison Brie) encourages Troy (Donald Glover) and Britta (Gillian Jacobs) to have lunch together while she joins Abed (Danny Pudi) in his "Dreamatorium", a room where he and Troy simulate imaginary adventures. Abed and Annie recreate Inspector Spacetime, but Abed quickly becomes irritated. Annie realizes he's angry that she set up Troy and Britta, and Abed insists she is messing with the group. To prove his point, he simulates Troy and Britta's date going poorly.

When Annie finds the demonstration silly, Abed shows her the Dreamatorium's "engine", a cardboard contraption which he claims creates objective simulations. Frustrated, Annie rearranges the engine to consider other people's thoughts. Abed panics and passes out; when he awakens, he pretends to be Jeff (Joel McHale) and simulates a hospital environment that Annie requested earlier. Annie eventually plays along, demanding to know where Abed is. After encountering several simulated group members as hospital staff, Annie learns Abed is a patient. Seeking to find Abed, she tells "Jeff" to take her where she wants to go; "Jeff" instead takes her to the scene where they kissed. (Note: As seen in "Pascal's Triangle Revisited".) He insists she pushed Abed aside and paired Troy and Britta together so she could be with him. Annie claims Abed is okay, but "Jeff" reads Abed's "file" and quotes her calling Abed a control freak without empathy. Disgusted, Annie storms off but runs into a wall, breaking the simulation.

Upset, Annie asks to be alone, so Abed creates a new simulation and pretends to be her. "Annie" insists they love Jeff, but Annie explains she simply wants to be loved and repeatedly runs through scenarios with Jeff to get him to love her. "Annie" remarks that her scenarios sound like Abed's simulations, inspiring Annie to pretend to be Abed. "Chang" (Ken Jeong) arrives and places "Abed" in a locker with the real Abed. There, Abed expresses concerns that the group will eventually push him away. Annie, as herself, explains that his simulations are impressive but inaccurate; they simply manifest his anxieties. She acknowledges that they both need to work on not trying to script life. Satisfied, the two return to the Inspector Spacetime simulation.

When the group returns from their break, Troy reveals that he and Britta enjoyed lunch together and apologizes to Abed for leaving him. Abed tells Troy it's okay and compliments Annie's work in the Dreamatorium.

== Production ==
The episode was written by producer Matt Murray, his second writing credit for the show after "Advanced Gay". It was directed by Tristram Shapeero, his fifth credit for the season and ninth overall.

The episode features heavy usage of special effects to create the interior of the Dreamatorium. In a PaleyFest panel, several cast and crew members explained that the challenges of filming the episode led to concerns during production about the result.

== Reception ==
=== Ratings ===
In its original broadcast, the episode was seen by 2.77 million American viewers and achieved a 1.3/5 in the 18-49 demographics. The show placed fourth in its time slot behind American Idol, a repeat of The Big Bang Theory, and Missing.

=== Reviews ===
The episode received mostly positive reviews. Robert Canning of IGN gave it 9 out of 10, denoting an "amazing" episode. He appreciated that the show embraced its own way of telling stories with the characters, writing that it "might turn off the casual viewer, but it's exactly the kind of episode fans love to see." Emma Matthews of Den of Geek agreed that the episode would not earn the show any new fans but enjoyed both the exploration into Abed's mindset and many of the episode's smaller jokes. Emily VanDerWerff of The A.V. Club gave the episode an A, likening it to another serious, character-driven episode, season 2's "Critical Film Studies". She appreciated the connection between Annie and Abed and enjoyed Annie's characterization, which she felt had been weakening since season 2. Bill Wyman of Slate described the episode as "Tron meets Shutter Island meets Inception meets … Gray's Anatomy [sic]" and liked the episode's commentary on relationships and the complexities of sitcoms.

Some critics were more ambivalent about the episode. Sean Gandert of Paste gave the episode a rating of 8.0 and found the format to be well-executed but criticized the show for making Abed self-centered, which seemed contradictory to his actions during the previous three seasons. Joshua Kurp of Vulture respected and admired the show's efforts, but he found the lack of a centerpiece scene or a strong emotional climax to be problematic. Alan Sepinwall of Uproxx found it to be "a strange episode, and not an especially funny one", but he did enjoy what the episode had to say about Abed and Annie.
