= Blanket fort =

Construction made with blankets, pillows and other similar items

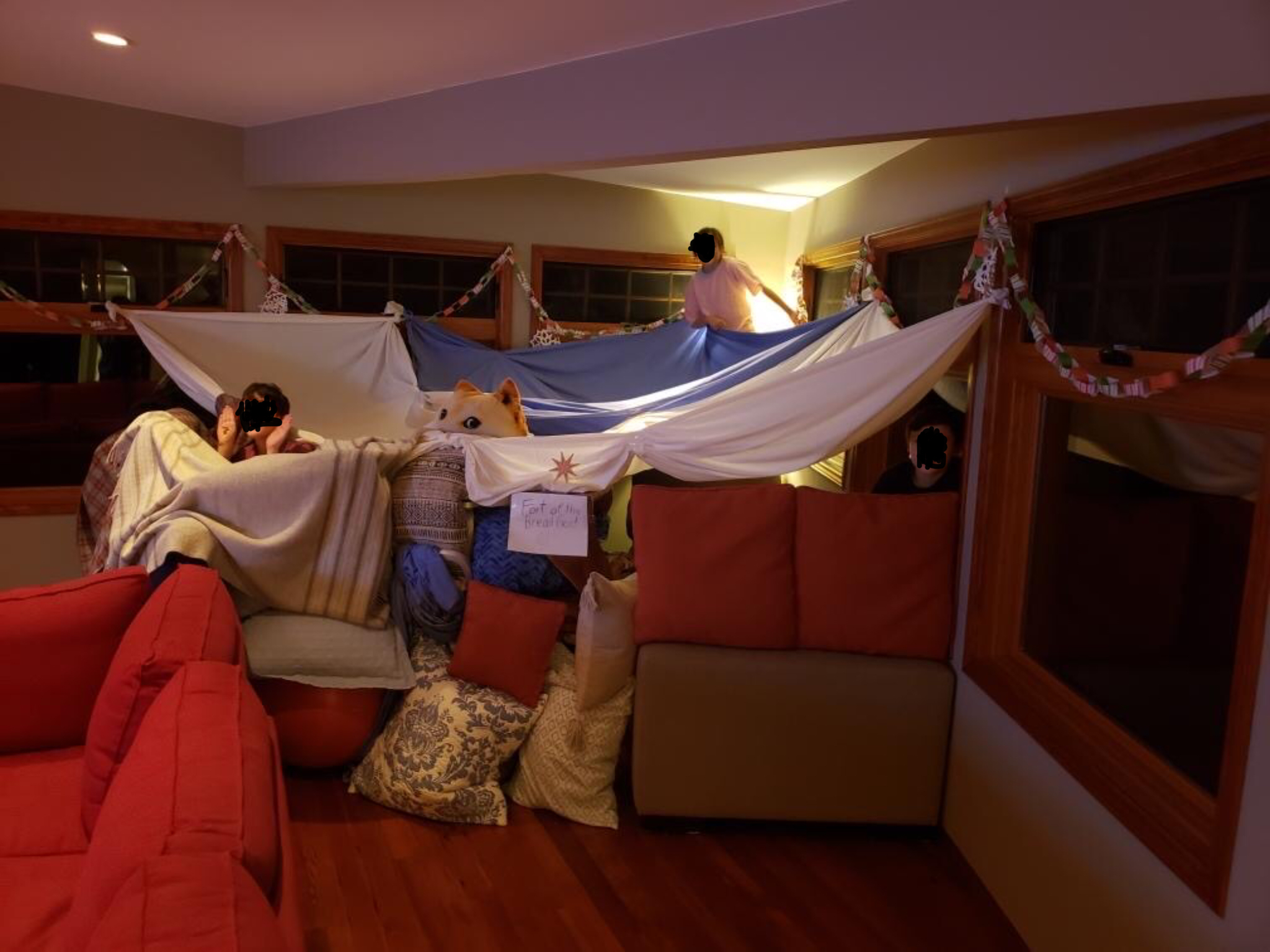
A large blanket fort

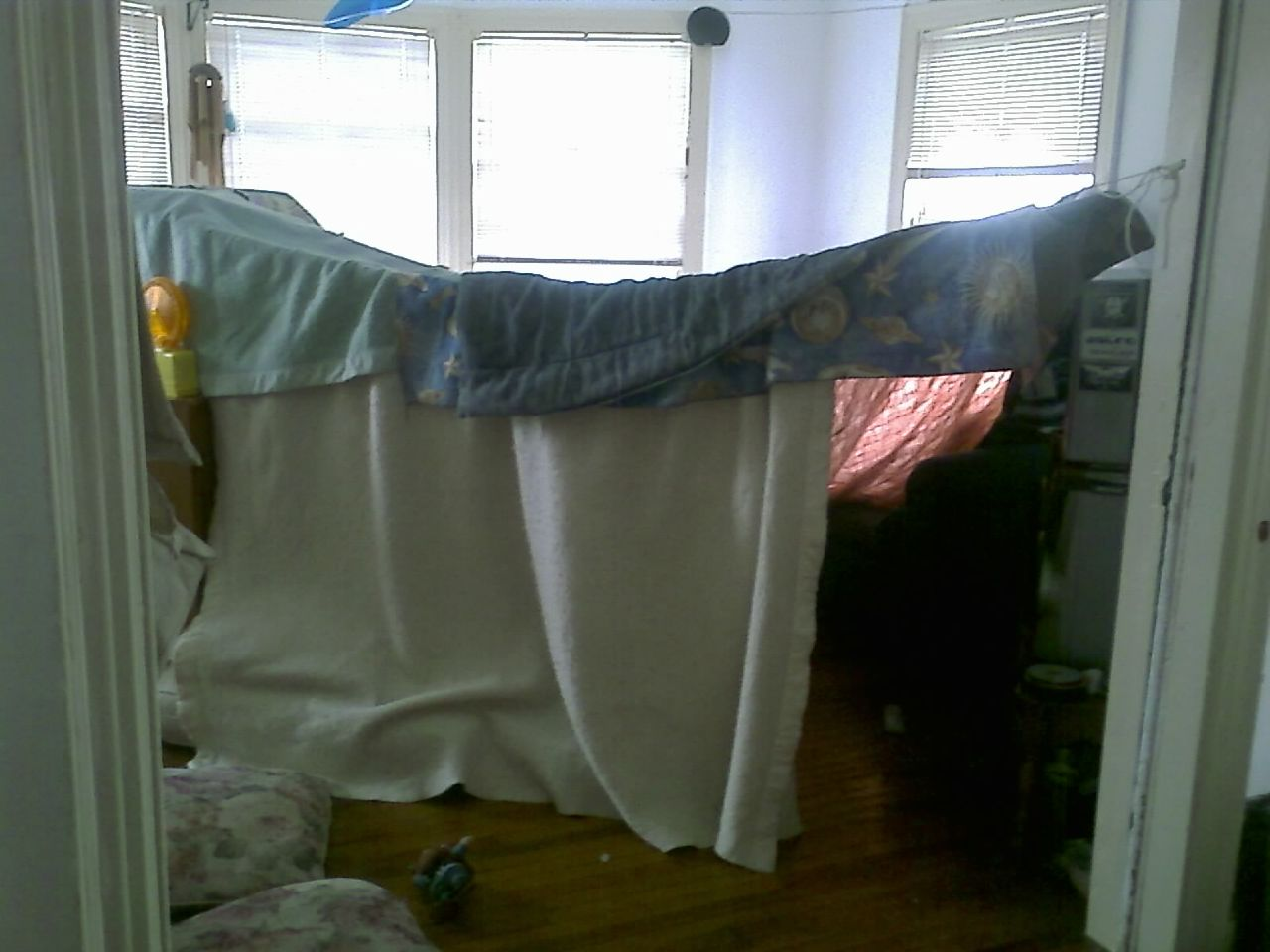
A blanket fort suspended on strings

A blanket fort is a construction commonly made using blankets, bed sheets, pillows, and sofa cushions. It is also known as a couch fort, pillow fort, sheet fort or den.

Parenting books frequently suggest building blanket forts as an activity for parents to participate in play with their children. A blanket fort is made by grabbing blankets around the house and setting them up in a room-like manner. Furniture such as a dining table, a bunk bed, chairs, or an overturned couch can form the foundation for a blanket fort. Clothespins, binder clips, and safety pins may be used to connect blankets and sheets.

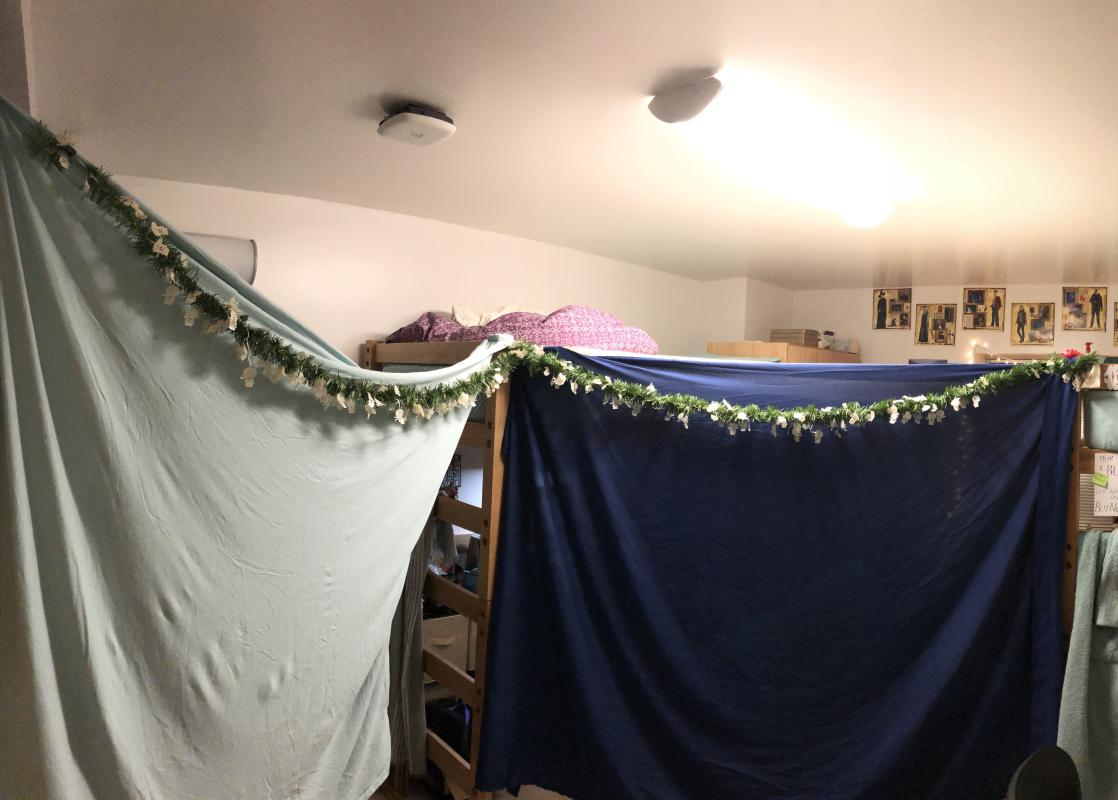
A blanket fort constructed in a college dormitory using the lofted beds as support

== In popular culture ==
As a staple of early childhood entertainment, blanket forts are commonly referenced in children's books, such as Corduroy's Sleepover and If You Give a Pig a Party.

In the third season of the television series Community, the episodes "Digital Exploration of Interior Design" and "Pillows and Blankets" focus on the idea of building the biggest blanket fort.

== World record ==
According to Guinness World Records, the largest blanket fort ever was 1,141.79 m^{2} (12,290.1 sq ft) and was built by Cub Scouts Pack 502, Scouts BSA Troop 502B, and Scouts BSA Troop 502G on May 13, 2023, in Mount Pleasant, South Carolina. The record was attempted "to empower the scouts towards meaningful service and to engage, raise awareness, and respond to needs within their community."

== See also ==
- Pillow fight
- Tree house
- Pillowfort
