= Communication Studies (Community) =

- Community episode
- Episode no.: Season 1 Episode 16
- Directed by: Adam Davidson
- Written by: Chris McKenna
- Production code: 116
- Original air date: February 11, 2010

Guest appearances
- Jim Rash as Dean Craig Pelton; Lauren Stamile as Professor Michelle Slater; Dino Stamatopoulos as Star-Burns; Brandon Soo Hoo as Abed's Chang; Dominik Musiol as Pavel

Episode chronology
← Previous "Romantic Expressionism"	Next → "Physical Education"
- Community season 1

"Communication Studies" is the sixteenth episode of the first season of the U.S. television sitcom Community. It originally aired on February 11, 2010, on NBC.

In the episode, on Abed's advice, Jeff tries to help Britta regain confidence in their relationship after an embarrassing drunk dial. Meanwhile, Annie and Shirley's plan to take revenge on Chang for humiliating Troy and Pierce backfires. The episode is also notable for beginning the series' Beetlejuice gag, in a character uttering "Beetlejuice," a name next uttered in "Cooperative Calligraphy," and again for a final time in "Horror Fiction in Seven Spooky Steps," leading to Betelgeuse (Beetlejuice) himself walking by, as in the Beetlejuice franchise, wherein the man would enter the scene upon his name being uttered thrice.

The episode was written by Chris McKenna and directed by Adam Davidson. It received mostly positive critical reviews.

== Plot ==
Jeff (Joel McHale) is invited to Greendale College's Valentine's Day dance by his girlfriend and statistics professor, Michelle (Lauren Stamile). On the way to the library, he discovers a voicemail from a drunk Britta (Gillian Jacobs) from the previous night. At the library, Annie (Alison Brie), Shirley (Yvette Nicole Brown), and Abed (Danny Pudi) receive Valentine's Day gifts, but Troy (Donald Glover) and Pierce (Chevy Chase) do not. Jeff plays a hungover Britta the message she left him, mocking the implication of the booty call, leaving her humiliated.

After the group notices that Britta has been left too embarrassed to talk to Jeff as a result of the booty call, Abed explains that according to the rules of character dynamics in sitcoms like theirs, due to the interruption of Jeff's and Britta's sexual tension-imbued storyline, the only way the two can go back to their old mutually competitive relationship is for her to see him embarrass himself. They decide that Jeff must return Britta's drunk booty call with a fake drunk one of his own. Jeff and Abed spend the evening getting drunk enough for Jeff to make a believable call. The next day, they discover that Jeff made calls to both Michelle and Britta but don't remember anything about either of them.

At Spanish class, the Greendale Human Being delivers Valentine's gifts to Troy and Pierce. Señor Chang (Ken Jeong) guesses right away that the presents were sent by themselves to make it look like they have girlfriends. Chang ridicules them in front of the class. Later, Annie and Shirley devise a plan to prank Chang in revenge. The next day in class, Chang receives a letter purportedly from Princeton offering him an associate professor position. He instantly calls the bluff and blames Troy and Pierce for the failed prank. In retribution, he forces them to escort him to the Valentine's dance wearing ladies' pantsuits and threatens to fail them if they refuse.

At the dance, Michelle is angry at Jeff for drunk calling her and then hanging up after discovering she wasn't Britta. Jeff tries to come clean, but Michelle refuses to listen. Troy and Pierce are dressed up in pantsuits and ready to hit the dance floor, but are stopped by Annie and Shirley. They confess to sending the fake letter and have decided to tell Chang the truth so that they can suffer the consequences. However, Troy and Pierce are touched by their gesture and follow through with their embarrassing ordeal.

Britta arrives, dressed formally, and tells Jeff that he invited her to the dance during his booty call. Jeff panics and confesses that his relationship with Michelle is likely to be over because of the voicemails. Britta then reveals that he didn't actually invite her and that she dressed up to test the legitimacy of his booty call. She then plays Michelle the voicemail she received from Jeff, in which he confesses his love for Michelle, which leads to the couple's reconciliation.

In the end tag, Pierce abandons Troy after the party to get frozen yogurt with Chang.

== Production ==
"Communication Studies" was written by Chris McKenna, his first writing credit of the series. It was directed by Adam Davidson, his second directing credit.

== Music ==
Several songs can be heard in the episode: "We Are Not Alone" performed by Karla DeVito, from the soundtrack of The Breakfast Club, during the drinking montage; "Going Crazy" by The Paparazzi Kids, when Chang dances with Pierce and Troy; and "If I Die Before You", performed by Ludwig Göransson, while Britta and Jeff have their conversation at the dance.

== Cultural references ==
When Jeff first encounters Britta having a hangover, he asks, "Can I get you an alibi for Cobain's suicide?" The next day, Britta counters a hungover Jeff's zinger: "You look like you're about ready to marry Courtney Love."

When describing the change in dynamics of Jeff and Britta's relationship, Abed uses an example from Who's the Boss? in which Tony sees Angela naked in the opening credits. When devising a plan to fix the relationship, Abed uses the example from the episode "The One With the Boobies" in Friends. Chandler sees Rachel naked and had to reciprocate by getting naked for Rachel.

The montage of bizarre dancing and other wacky activities by Jeff and Abed while drunk was inspired by The Breakfast Club, a film which was mentioned by Abed in the episode as he fails to recall the name of the female lead.

The episode is also notable for beginning the series' Beetlejuice gag, in a character uttering the name "Beetlejuice"; in the self-titled 1988 film, animated series, and musical, the character of Betelgeuse (Beetlejuice) would suddenly enter the scene whenever someone said his name three times, with the name next being uttered in "Cooperative Calligraphy", and again for a final time in "Horror Fiction in Seven Spooky Steps", immediately after which Beetlejuice himself (portrayed by an uncredited extra) walks by in the background, paying off the gag.

== Reception ==
=== Ratings ===
In its original American broadcast, "Communication Studies" was viewed by an estimated 5.15 million people, with a Nielsen rating/share of 2.3/7 in the 18–49 demographic.

=== Reviews ===
"Communication Studies" received mostly positive reviews from critics.

Jonah Krakow of IGN said "There was plenty to love about this episode, including some great interaction between Jeff and Britta, some spot-on pop culture quips from Abed and some hilarious character work from Troy, Pierce and Senor Chang." He gave the episode an 8.8/10 rating. Jason Hughes of AOL TV said, "Suddenly I want to spend at least 40 more minutes in the world of 'Community' after tonight's episode... Jeff and Abed tore it up with one of the most bizarre drunk montages I've ever seen, culminating with Abed in the absolute best 'aftermath' position I've ever seen. Eric Hochberger of TV Fanatic gave the episode a 4.0/5 rating, saying "The main story line was not only hilarious, but also strong in terms of cementing Jeff's relationship with Slater and pushing off any potential Britta-Jeff pairing for seasons. That's kind of a good thing because we don't need yet another show based on sexual tension."

Emily VanDerWerff of The A.V. Club gave "Communication Studies" a 'B' and said the episode had too many plot twists: "It's the thing where you think there's going to be a standard sitcom plot twist that occurs, and then the show goes out of its way to show you that the standard plot twist didn't actually happen. Community tries it four or five times in tonight's episode, and by the end, it feels a little too much like piling on." VanDerWerff praised the show's ending and the handling of the Jeff-Britta dynamic: "what finally makes this one work for me is that last scene between Michelle, Jeff and Britta. Obviously, this show is going to push Jeff and Britta together at some point, but I appreciate a show that's willing to do this less because it's obligatory and more because it wants to toy with our expectations."
