= Community season 3 =

Season of television series

Community
- Season 3
- DVD cover
- Showrunner: Dan Harmon
- Starring: Joel McHale; Gillian Jacobs; Danny Pudi; Yvette Nicole Brown; Alison Brie; Donald Glover; Jim Rash; Ken Jeong; Chevy Chase
- No. of episodes: 22

Release
- Original network: NBC
- Original release: September 22, 2011 – May 17, 2012

Season chronology
- ← Previous; Season 2 Next → Season 4

The third season of the television sitcom Community premiered on September 22, 2011, and concluded on May 17, 2012, on NBC. The season consists of 22 episodes and aired on Thursdays at 8:00 pm ET as part of the network's "Comedy Night Done Right" programming block.

== Cast ==
=== Starring ===
- Joel McHale as Jeff Winger
- Gillian Jacobs as Britta Perry
- Danny Pudi as Abed Nadir
- Yvette Nicole Brown as Shirley Bennett
- Alison Brie as Annie Edison
- Donald Glover as Troy Barnes
- Jim Rash as Dean Craig Pelton
- Ken Jeong as Ben Chang
- Chevy Chase as Pierce Hawthorne

=== Recurring ===
- Richard Erdman as Leonard Briggs
- Erik Charles Nielsen as Garrett Lambert
- Dino Stamatopoulos as Alex "Star-Burns" Osbourne
- John Goodman as Vice Dean Robert Laybourne
- Danielle Kaplowitz as Vicki Jenkins
- Luke Youngblood as Magnitude
- Dan Bakkedahl as Murray the AC Repairman
- Charley Koontz as Neil
- J. P. Manoux as Faux-by
- Mel Rodriguez as Sgt. Nunez
- Michael K. Williams as Biology Professor Marshall Kane
- Jerry Minor as Jerry the Janitor
- Eddie Pepitone as Crazy Schmidt
- David Neher as Todd Jacobson
- Larry Cedar as Cornelius Hawthorne
- Craig Cackowski as Officer Cackowski
- Wil Garret as Harry Jefferson

=== Guest stars ===
- Rob Corddry as Alan Connor ("Introduction to Finality")
- Keith David as Narrator ("Pillows and Blankets")
- Giancarlo Esposito as Gilbert Lawson ("Digital Estate Planning")
- Kirk Fox as Blade, Britta's carnie ex-boyfriend ("Origins of Vampire Mythology")
- Irene Choi as Annie Kim ("Geography of Global Conflict")
- Jeff Garlin as himself ("Documentary Filmmaking: Redux")
- Luis Guzmán as himself ("Documentary Filmmaking: Redux")
- Leslie Hendrix as Botanist ("Basic Lupine Urology"), a play on her role as a medical examiner in the Law & Order franchise the episode is styled upon
- John Hodgman as Dr. Heidi ("Curriculum Unavailable")
- Michael Ironside as Colonel Archwood ("Basic Lupine Urology")
- David St. James as Professor Albrecht ("Curriculum Unavailable")
- Taran Killam as Cory "Mr. Rad" Radison ("Regional Holiday Music")
- Marcy McCusker as Quendra ("Basic Lupine Urology")
- Meggie McFadden as Linda Greene ("Digital Exploration of Interior Design" uncredited cameo)
- Dominik Musiol as Pavel Iwaszkiewicz ("Documentary Filmmaking: Redux")
- D.J. "Shangela" Pierce as Miss Urbana Champaign ("Advanced Gay")
- DC Pierson as Mark Millot ("Digital Exploration of Interior Design" uncredited cameo)
- Travis Schuldt as Subway / Rick ("Digital Exploration of Interior Design")
- Martin Starr as Professor Cligoris ("Geography of Global Conflict")
- French Stewart as Vinnie, a former French Stewart look-alike ("Contemporary Impressionists")
- Malcolm-Jamal Warner as Andre Bennett ("Urban Matrimony and the Sandwich Arts")

== Episodes ==
Season three episodes
No. overall	No. in season	Title	Directed by	Written by	Original release date	Prod. code	U.S. viewers (millions)
50	1	"Biology 101"	Anthony Russo	Garrett Donovan & Neil Goldman	September 22, 2011	301	3.93
The study group decides to take a biology class together; Pierce attempts to rejoin the group, and does after Jeff quickly makes enemies with its professor (Michael K. Williams) and is removed from the class. Meanwhile, Dean Pelton finds himself in conflict with Vice Dean Laybourne (John Goodman), the Dean of the renowned Air Conditioning Repair Annex, while in the process of transforming Greendale's management.
51	2	"Geography of Global Conflict"	Joe Russo	Andy Bobrow	September 29, 2011	302	3.98
A Model UN competition introduces Annie to a new frenemy in Annie Kim; Jeff and the rest of the group try to help her win and Annie has a big tantrum in the process. Britta goes head to head with new Campus Security Officer Chang, as they both try to fulfill their own fantasies through foolish conflict.
52	3	"Competitive Ecology"	Anthony Russo	Maggie Bandur	October 6, 2011 (Note: The episode listing is the broadcast order. Episodes 3 and 4, and 11 and 12 were switched around in their original broadcast but appear in production order on home media releases.)	304	3.35
While the study group pairs off to build a terrarium, the seven group members have to include an outsider, Todd, in order to make even pairs and their friendships are tested. Meanwhile, Chang relishes his imaginary role as a noir detective and ends up causing a lot of damage.
53	4	"Remedial Chaos Theory"	Jeff Melman	Chris McKenna	October 13, 2011	303	3.78
Troy and Abed's housewarming party turns into a surreal, post-modern world with parallel realities; each reality showing the effect on the study group of one character's brief absence from it.
54	5	"Horror Fiction in Seven Spooky Steps"	Tristram Shapeero	Dan Harmon	October 27, 2011	305	3.42
In order to determine the odd man out of the group (who, in this case, is apparently a sociopath), Britta conducts a search by having the gang tell scary stories.
55	6	"Advanced Gay"	Joe Russo	Matt Murray	November 3, 2011	306	3.84
When Hawthorne Wipes becomes popular after being promoted by a drag queen, Pierce is excited about a party he's throwing to celebrate the business' success with the gay community, but the affair becomes very different when his elderly father arrives. Meanwhile, Troy is scouted by Vice Dean Laybourne to join the AC Annex.
56	7	"Studies in Modern Movement"	Tristram Shapeero	Adam Countee	November 10, 2011	307	3.49
The group tries to help Annie move in with Troy and Abed, but things go awry when she becomes frustrated by their lifestyle. Meanwhile, Dean Pelton blackmails Jeff into spending the afternoon with him.
57	8	"Documentary Filmmaking: Redux"	Joe Russo	Megan Ganz	November 17, 2011	308	3.62
Dean Pelton is asked by the school board to film a new commercial for Greendale, only to spiral into madness when Luis Guzmán agrees to appear in it, all the while Abed films the events documenting the Dean's descent.
58	9	"Foosball and Nocturnal Vigilantism"	Anthony Russo	Chris Kula	December 1, 2011	309	3.74
Jeff and Shirley spend time together playing foosball, where the two become competitive against each other. After Annie breaks Abed's special edition DVD of The Dark Knight, she and Troy must cover it up by staging a robbery.
59	10	"Regional Holiday Music"	Tristram Shapeero	Steve Basilone & Annie Mebane	December 8, 2011	311	3.60
Greendale's choir director (Taran Killam) asks the study group to fill in at the holiday pageant after the glee club is unable to attend, with Abed taking charge to convince each of them.
60	11	"Urban Matrimony and the Sandwich Arts"	Kyle Newacheck	Vera Santamaria	March 15, 2012	312	4.75
Andre re-proposes to Shirley; Britta and Annie quickly begin making arrangements for the wedding, Jeff must write a speech, and Troy and Abed attempt to become "normal" for the wedding. Meanwhile, Pierce and Shirley try to get a sandwich shop installed in the cafeteria.
61	12	"Contemporary Impressionists"	Kyle Newacheck	Alex Cooley	March 22, 2012	310	3.87
After Abed racks up an immense amount of debt hiring celebrity impersonators, the study groups helps by working for the company at a bar mitzvah. Meanwhile, Troy attempts to convince Abed the severity of his debt, while Jeff begins experiencing extreme narcissism.
62	13	"Digital Exploration of Interior Design"	Dan Eckman	Chris McKenna	March 29, 2012	313	3.48
Vice Dean Laybourne returns to try to win Troy over, manipulating a conflict between him and Abed, resulting in them building competing blanket and pillow forts in the school. Meanwhile, a new Subway shop opens in the cafeteria, and Shirley, Pierce, and Britta attempt to shut it down; complicating matters when they meet a student named "Subway" enrolled at the school.
63	14	"Pillows and Blankets"	Tristram Shapeero	Andy Bobrow	April 5, 2012	314	3.00
Presented in the style of Ken Burns' documentary, The Civil War: What starts as a casual disagreement over pillows and blankets soon blossoms into all-out war on the Greendale campus. While insults are hurled and the study group choose loyalties, Jeff tries to negotiate a truce, but with neither Abed nor Troy budging on their principles or real estate, the future looks grim for the duo's friendship.
64	15	"Origins of Vampire Mythology"	Steven Tsuchida	Dan Harmon	April 12, 2012	315	3.09
The carnival comes into town and Britta enlists the help of the study group to keep her away from her ex; Dean Pelton joins to attempt to convince Troy to join the AC Annex. Meanwhile, Jeff becomes obsessed trying to learn why Britta is so obsessed with her ex.
65	16	"Virtual Systems Analysis"	Tristram Shapeero	Matt Murray	April 19, 2012	316	2.77
When a final exam is postponed, Annie talks Abed into letting her spend some time in the dreamatorium, where an innocent simulation turns into an examination of the study group.
66	17	"Basic Lupine Urology"	Rob Schrab	Megan Ganz	April 26, 2012	317	3.21
In a homage to Law & Order, the study group investigate a crime when someone sabotages their biology experiment. When they discover the perp, Annie plans on prosecuting them to the fullest extent of Greendale's Code of Conduct.
67	18	"Course Listing Unavailable"	Tristram Shapeero	Tim Saccardo	May 3, 2012	318	3.20
In the wake of Star-Burns' death, and their biology credit becoming invalid after the professor quits, the study group faces extreme feelings of grief. Meanwhile, Chang takes advantage of the chaos and begins to take over the campus.
68	19	"Curriculum Unavailable"	Adam Davidson	Adam Countee	May 10, 2012	319	2.99
When Abed becomes convinced that Dean Pelton has been replaced by an impostor, he is required to see a therapist (John Hodgman), who attempts to convince the group that they have been experiencing a shared psychosis and Greendale is actually a mental institution. This leads to the group to recall the stranger activities and events that took place at Greendale through a series of flashbacks.
69	20	"Digital Estate Planning"	Adam Davidson	Matt Warburton	May 17, 2012	322	2.97
Pierce is summoned to Hawthorne Enterprises to discuss his inheritance with his deceased father's former right-hand man, Gilbert Lawson (Giancarlo Esposito). The study group all pitches in to play a video game for Pierce to earn the inheritance, only to have to deal with sabotage from Gilbert.
70	21	"The First Chang Dynasty"	Jay Chandrasekhar	Matt Fusfeld & Alex Cuthbertson	May 17, 2012	320	2.61
When Chang gains complete control of Greendale's campus, the study group forms a plot to take back the school and rescue the kidnapped Dean, while Troy seeks help from the AC Annex.
71	22	"Introduction to Finality"	Tristram Shapeero	Steve Basilone & Annie Mebane	May 17, 2012	321	2.48
Jeff acts as counsel for Shirley in her and Pierce's sandwich shop case, the latter of which being represented by Jeff's old law partner Alan. Meanwhile, Abed struggles to deal with Troy's absence, becoming influenced by "Evil Abed", while Vice Dean Laybourne continues to try convince Troy of his destiny at the Air Conditioning Repair School.

== Production ==
The series was renewed for a third season on March 17, 2011. Filming for the season began on July 25, 2011. Jim Rash, who portrays Dean Pelton, was promoted to a series regular after having a recurring role throughout the first two seasons. Michael K. Williams was cast as the study group's new biology professor, who is described as a deeply intense character. John Goodman appears in a multi-episode arc as Vice Dean Laybourne, the head of Greendale's air conditioning repair school, and is a foe for Dean Pelton. Martin Starr guest starred in the second episode of the season as a political science professor and project advisor when the study group take a Model UN class; with Starr possibly returning later in the season. Larry Cedar appeared in the sixth episode as Cornelius Hawthorne, the patriarch of the Hawthorne family and Pierce's father. In the same episode, Jerry Minor returned as the Greendale custodian who previously appeared in "English as a Second Language" and "For a Few Paintballs More". The season's Christmas-themed episode is a musical featuring all original music, with the storyline being the study group having to fill in for the school's glee club. The episode also features a guest appearance by Saturday Night Live cast member Taran Killam. Giancarlo Esposito appeared in "Digital Estate Planning" as Gilbert, a man who Pierce is surprised to learn was a longtime employee for his late, very racist father, and the study group needs to work with Gilbert and Pierce on an issue regarding Cornelius' Hawthorne's last will and testament. The character of Star-Burns is killed off in episode 17 of the season, as portrayer of the character Dino Stamatopoulos simply asked for it to happen. Stamatopoulos also serves as a consulting producer and writer for the series, so he wanted to focus on his main job, as he explained "I'm not an actor". Series creator Dan Harmon explained Star-Burns' death is "not just thrown away", but "triggers the rest of the entire season. Filming of the season concluded in mid-February 2012.

Dan Harmon planned on making the third season more cohesive than the previous, with more connectivity between the storylines of the episodes, as well as to make the show more grounded, with somewhat fewer themed episodes. Harmon also planned out the characters' storylines for the entire season. Explaining the theme of the third season, and Jeff's journey for the season, Harmon says, "Season 3 is about the price that you pay when you figure out that you love a group of people. That's it in a nutshell. It's about the high cost of valuing people other than yourself, and that's the path that Jeff has been on. The third chapter for him is going to be the toughest of all. When you love people, their pain is your pain. Nobody likes having to deal with hassles more than Jeff Winger, and nobody's going to have to deal with more this year."

On November 14, 2011, NBC announced that they were removing Community from their mid-season schedule to make room for 30 Rock, which returned to Thursday nights. On February 21, 2012, it was announced that the series would return on March 15, 2012.

== Reception ==
On Rotten Tomatoes, the season has an approval rating of 92% with an average score of 8.3 out of 10 based on 24 reviews. The website's critical consensus reads, "The Greendale study group take some of their boldest swings – though not all connect – in this freewheeling third season that nevertheless continues Community's streak as the gold standard for fiendishly clever television."

== Home media ==
The third season was released on DVD in region 1 on August 14, 2012, in region 2 on September 2, 2013, and in region 4 on September 21, 2012.
