= Pillows and Blankets =

- Community episode
- Episode no.: Season 3 Episode 14
- Directed by: Tristram Shapeero
- Written by: Andy Bobrow
- Production code: 314
- Original air date: April 5, 2012

Guest appearances
- Keith David as Narrator; Richard Erdman as Leonard; Charley Koontz as Fat Neil; Erik Charles Nielsen as Garrett; Dino Stamatopoulos as Star-Burns; Luke Youngblood as Magnitude

Episode chronology
← Previous "Digital Exploration of Interior Design"	Next → "Origins of Vampire Mythology"
- Community season 3

"Pillows and Blankets" is the fourteenth episode of the third season of the American television series Community. It originally aired on April 5, 2012, on NBC.

== Plot ==
The episode, framed as a documentary in the style of Ken Burns' The Civil War and narrated by Keith David, details a disagreement about a blanket fort blossoming into an all-out pillow fight on the Greendale campus.

Continuing the plot of the previous episode, Abed's (Danny Pudi) pillow-fort faction (Pillowtown) and Troy's (Donald Glover) blanket-fort faction (Blanketsburg) confront each other in the study hall. A pillow fight breaks out when a pillow carelessly thrown by Star-Burns (Dino Stamatopoulos) collapses part of the Blanketsburg fort. Dean Pelton (Jim Rash) convinces Jeff (Joel McHale) to organize a meeting to reconcile Troy and Abed in order to build a joint blanket-pillow fort worthy of a Guinness world record. However, Jeff's dismissive attempt to reconcile the rivals with imaginary "friend hats" fails. Troy demands that Abed demolish his pillow fort to make way for Troy's blanket fort, but Abed declines the ultimatum, so at midnight, members of Blanketsburg attack a fort made by Pillowtown. Troy then declares war on Pillowtown.

Jeff gives inspiring speeches to both sides to avoid classes resuming, upsetting Annie (Alison Brie), acting as a battlefield nurse, who emphasizes to him that Troy and Abed's friendship is at stake.

After a humiliating injury at the hands of Pillowtown soldiers, Pierce (Chevy Chase) gives Abed the blueprints to a "doomsday device"; when Troy finds out about it, he attacks Pillowtown with the force of preteen "security interns" Ben Chang (Ken Jeong) previously recruited at a bar mitzvah. (Note: As seen in "Contemporary Impressionists.") After Chang's force starts winning the battle, Abed unleashes the doomsday device: Pierce in a full-body pillow suit. Abed then sends an email to members of Pillowtown outlining Troy's psychological vulnerabilities. Hurt, Troy sends an angry text message to Abed saying that he is Abed's only friend and that no one else will have the patience to deal with Abed's issues. Jeff tries to hold a peace conference, but negotiations fail as Abed and Troy agree that their friendship is over and the loser of the war must move out of their apartment.

The next morning, a massive battle occurs in the cafeteria, but the battle concludes in anticlimax when Dean Pelton announces that the representative for Guinness was fired, causing both factions to lose interest and disperse. Though everyone else has left, Abed and Troy continue fighting, telling Jeff it will be the last thing they will ever do together. Jeff points out that their reluctance to stop the pillow fight indicates that subconsciously they don't actually want to part ways. The two agree to make up so long as Jeff gives them the imaginary "friend hats" with which he had earlier tried to reconcile them, and they become friends again. Jeff then reveals to the documentary crew that he actually went to the Dean's office to "retrieve" the friend hats instead of merely standing out of sight for a few minutes, since he does take the relationships of his friends seriously, even if he's not entirely sure why.

Britta (Gillian Jacobs) has bungled her attempts to chronicle the war through photographs, but finally manages to capture Abed and Troy becoming friends again by accident, as she tries to take an unrelated picture of waffles.

== Reception ==
The episode was watched by 3.00 million American viewers and gained a 1.3 18-49 rating. This was a series low in viewers for the show, although it was NBC's highest rated program of the night.

Robert Canning of IGN gave the episode a 10 out of 10, calling it a "stellar episode, twisting a pop culture reference in a way that not only provided laughs but a well-told story with heart." Barry Hertz of the National Post said "in a triumph of editing and plotting, we’re treated to not just a stellar parody of the oft-mocked documentary form, but a revealing and satisfying episode of Community itself, complete with strong characterization, story closure and wild, GIF-ready visuals to keep the Internet masses satiated." Tim Surette of TV.com applauded the characters' roles in the episode, saying "There was enough attention to make sure that every character had a great role in the war even though the bulk of the episode was just presentation. And at the heart of it all, we all wanted Troy and Abed to eventually make amends." Jenn Lee of BuddyTV said "While it wasn't an entirely dramatic episode (the mimicry took care of that), "Pillows and Blankets" didn't carry the same light-hearted tone as a typical Community storyline, which I appreciated, given the subject matter."

Pete Vonder Haar of the Houston Press gave the episode a more mixed review, saying "there were some really great touches this week: 'Nurse' Annie using a lint brush to clean feathers from the 'wounded' and administering IV Gatorade; the use of text messages as a substitute for soldiers' letters home; invisible friendship hats...but every time they returned to the documentary motif, I groaned. And the extensive battle scenes felt like filler more than anything else. There's plenty of fuel for further episodes, but I wasn't as taken with 'Pillows and Blankets' as Harmon and company intended."
