= Documentary Filmmaking: Redux =

- Community episode
- Episode no.: Season 3 Episode 8
- Directed by: Joe Russo
- Written by: Megan Ganz
- Production code: 308
- Original air date: November 17, 2011

Guest appearances
- Luis Guzmán as Luis Guzmán; Richard Erdman as Leonard; Charley Koontz as Fat Neil; Erik Charles Nielsen as Garrett; Luke Youngblood as Magnitude; Dominik Musiol as Pavel; Jeremy Scott Johnson as Board Member 1; Brady Novak as Board Member 2; Jeff Garlin as himself; Dino Stamatopoulos as Star-Burns

Episode chronology
← Previous "Studies in Modern Movement"	Next → "Foosball and Nocturnal Vigilantism"
- Community season 3

"Documentary Filmmaking: Redux" is the eighth episode of the third season of the American television series Community. It was originally broadcast on November 17, 2011, on NBC.

In the episode, Dean Pelton directs a new commercial for Greendale College, with members of the study group as actors and crew members. The entire episode is an in-universe documentary made by Abed, who is seeking to emulate the success of Hearts of Darkness: A Filmmaker's Apocalypse. Production of the commercial gets out of control as the Dean becomes insane and Abed is forced to abandon his objectivity to save the commercial.

The episode was written by Megan Ganz and directed by Joe Russo. It was released in the same week NBC announced that the series would be placed on hiatus in the mid-season, which prompted fans to mount an Internet campaign to prevent the show's cancellation. The episode received positive reviews from critics.

== Plot ==
The Greendale College Board gives Dean Pelton (Jim Rash) $2000 to shoot a new commercial for the college, so he enlists the help of the study group. Abed (Danny Pudi) declines to participate but instead shoots a documentary about the commercial's production. Throughout the episode, Abed asks to remain "invisible" to reduce interaction with the subjects of his documentary.

The dean makes himself director of the commercial with Annie (Alison Brie) as script supervisor. The rest of the group play roles in the commercial, including Jeff (Joel McHale) in a bald cap as the dean himself and Chang (Ken Jeong) as his understudy. Jeff plays the dean as a gay stereotype to make the Dean cast someone else and asks to shoot his scenes in front of the school's Luis Guzmán statue, hoping that Guzmán's lawyers will force his scenes to be cut due to image rights restrictions. Instead, the dean is enthralled with Jeff's performance, and Guzmán decides to play a part in the commercial, to the delight of the dean. Pierce (Chevy Chase) becomes a diva, demands a trailer, fails to get one, rents one on his own and locks himself in it "till I have the one I don't have!"

The dean decides to overhaul the entire script and production to make it far more elaborate and expensive. Production shuts down all school activities, and other students are chosen to participate in it as well. The Dean becomes overly demanding with the actors, forcing Britta (Gillian Jacobs) and Troy (Donald Glover) to reshoot a hugging scene for 12 hours. Production goes way over budget while the Dean becomes increasingly erratic, as does everyone around him, with Jeff becoming obsessed with his role and Annie trying desperately to justify the Dean's actions, resulting in her developing Stockholm Syndrome. Despite predicting that this would happen, Abed declines to intervene to avoid interfering with his documentary's story. Eventually, the actors and crew crack under the dean's demands and abandon him.

Guzmán arrives at Greendale to shoot the commercial. However, upon seeing the dean's disjointed initial cut, he decides not to be in it. While admonishing Guzmán, the dean insults Greendale, to which Guzmán angrily replies that he loved his own time at Greendale and the dean doesn't deserve a school that's ultimately so rewarding. The dean has a remorse-driven breakdown and films a video in which he addresses his insecurities about being in charge. He invites the Greendale Board members to view it, but instead a different video — a commercial made from Abed's footage — plays. The board members are impressed.

Abed reveals himself to be the one who made the commercial. In his documentary's closing statement, Abed says that documentarians are supposed to be objective to avoid having any effect on the story, yet they have the most effect because they are the ones who decided to tell it.

Finally, the dean offers the group an apology, which they accept, leading to a group hug. As everyone walks away, Britta and Troy continue hugging, giving Abed pause.

The trailer Pierce locks himself in ends up in Hollywood for Jeff Garlin's use. In the final scene, Pierce storms out as Garlin approaches the trailer. Garlin, stunned, then begins mirroring Pierce's earlier behavior, locking himself in the trailer while demanding a new one.

== Production ==
"Documentary Filmmaking: Redux" was written by Megan Ganz, her third writing credit for the series. It was directed by Joe Russo, his 19th directing credit.

Series creator Dan Harmon previewed the episode by tweeting: "AND, tonight, celebrate Community’s unschedualization with the least accessible, least marketable episode in its alienating history!", referring to the show's impending hiatus.

Luis Guzmán guest starred as himself. Jeff Garlin appeared in a brief scene at the end. Ryan McPartlin of Chuck had a cameo in the opening scene of the original Greendale commercial. The following month, Danny Pudi and Yvette Nicole Brown would appear on Chuck.

== Cultural references ==
The episode is a parody of Hearts of Darkness: A Filmmaker's Apocalypse, a documentary about the troubled production of the 1979 film Apocalypse Now. The episode title is a reference to both season 2's "Intermediate Documentary Filmmaking" and Apocalypse Now Redux.

References are also made to the documentaries Burden of Dreams and Lost in La Mancha.

Guzmán made a reference to the film Boogie Nights, in which he acted.

A scene with Jeff detailing how into the part he gets (as the Dean), his dialogue references the "Now the dream is over and the insect is awake" scene from the 1986 film The Fly.

There are slight similarities between this episode and Charlie Kaufman's 2008 film, Synecdoche, New York. In an interview segment of this episode with Ben Chang, he is shown playing Jeff Winger who is playing the Dean. This is illustrated by Chang wearing a wig for Jeff's hair as well a bald cap on top of that. Later on, Chang is shown to be following Jeff and acting out his every move. Effectively, this is similar to Synecdoche, New York where Caden Cotard has a stalker, Sammy, who is cast to play Caden later on in the film while the play is being created. Some scenes in the film are structured in a similar way to the one where Chang is following Jeff on set in this episode. It would make sense that Kaufman's work would be referenced here since it had already been mentioned in a prior episode, Messianic Myths and Ancient Peoples.

The episode also shows quite a few similarities to the mockumentary Waiting for Guffman: A homosexual and very eccentric director tries to fulfill his wish for widespread fame by hiring amateur actors to play the key roles in his new script. His expectations grow more and more unrealistic and he has soon spent the entire budget. The character of Guffman, just like Guzmán, is a popular figure in the show business and plays a key role in the movie/episode. Another key similarity is that the director has a camera following him around, documenting his progress, and suffers from a nervous breakdown along his way to completing his commercial/play.

== Reception ==
=== Ratings ===
In its original broadcast on November 17, 2011, the episode was viewed by an estimated 3.63 million people, with a Nielsen rating/share of 1.6/5 in the 18–49 demographic.

=== Reviews ===
"Documentary Filmmaking: Redux" received generally positive reviews from critics. Most critics praised Jim Rash's performance and Luis Guzman's appearance.

In a turbulent week for the show, Emily VanDerWerff of The A.V. Club described Abed's abandonment of objectivity at the end as the show's way of embracing its small, fervent fanbase: "And isn’t that why we tell stories in the first place? We want to share some part of ourselves that’s important to us... Stories are about entertaining other people, yes, but they’re also functionally about being part of something greater than yourself, about tapping into a community that gets excited by the same stuff you do and wants to listen to the same tales of excitement and woe. Community—one of the fan-service-iest shows on TV—has always understood this. It’s always understood that the flipside of being a low-rated cult hit is that the people who love you, adore you." VanDerWerff gave the episode an 'A,' saying that it "created the best possible argument for why it should be allowed to survive."

Alan Sepinwall of HitFix said "... I don't necessarily see "Documentary Filmmaking: Redux" as the key that's going to unlock a bright new future for the series. But I do look at it as yet another inspiring, hilarious, moving, example of why I'm so glad Team "Community" is out there, pushing the outer edge of the sitcom envelope, finding new and strange and brilliant ways to tell stories about this very diverse (minus Hispanics, alas) group of people who came together through a cosmic quirk of fate and now can't live without each other."

Leigh Raines of TV Fanatic gave "Documentary Filmmaking: Redux" 4.5/5 stars, praising Luis Guzmán's performance as "the best use of a guest star I've seen in forever." Hollywood.com's Kelsea Stahler said the episode was "unapologetically, unequivocally alienating; it’s an episode only a Community fan could love."
