= Origins of Vampire Mythology =

- Community episode
- Episode no.: Season 3 Episode 15
- Directed by: Steven Tsuchida
- Written by: Dan Harmon
- Production code: 315
- Original air date: April 12, 2012

Guest appearances
- John Goodman as Vice Dean Laybourne; Kirk Fox as Blade

Episode chronology
← Previous "Pillows and Blankets"	Next → "Virtual Systems Analysis"
- Community season 3

"Origins of Vampire Mythology" is the fifteenth episode of the third season of the American television series Community. It originally aired on April 12, 2012, on NBC. In the episode, Britta must resist the temptation to meet up with her ex-boyfriend Blade, and Jeff tries to figure out how Blade is able to attract women.

== Plot ==
Dean Pelton (Jim Rash) announces that a carnival is coming to Greendale. Britta (Gillian Jacobs) wonders if her ex-boyfriend Blade will be working there and worries she'll feel a reckless urge to see him. She demands that Annie (Alison Brie) help her by taking her phone and monitoring her for the weekend. Vice Dean Laybourne (John Goodman) orders Pelton to convince Troy (Donald Glover) to enter the A/C Repair School.

Britta stays at Troy, Abed (Danny Pudi), and Annie's apartment. Troy and Abed watch Blade, complicating Annie's plans to help Britta. Britta asks to see her phone, but Annie refuses to reveal its location. Troy lets slip that the phone is in the refrigerator, and he, Abed, and Annie are forced to lock Britta in Annie's bedroom. Pelton suddenly arrives, to the others' confusion.

Seeking to meet Blade, Jeff (Joel McHale) takes Shirley (Yvette Nicole Brown) to the carnival. Pierce (Chevy Chase) and Chang (Ken Jeong) also attend together, united by their lack of other friends. Jeff finds Blade (Kirk Fox) and begins playing his game. At the apartment, Britta calms down and asks Annie for her phone again. Annie agrees as a sign of trust, but she secretly switches Blade's number with hers. Britta begins relentlessly texting Annie and eventually starts calling; Annie worries her deception will be revealed.

Shirley remarks that Blade seems appealing because he's relaxed. Jeff continues to play the game and converses with Blade, desperate to learn Blade's secrets for attracting women. Annie's attempts to talk Britta down fail, so Troy takes Annie's phone and texts Britta something unknown. Britta suddenly stops texting and leaves Annie's room, calling Blade a loser. After Jeff spends hundreds of dollars, Blade agrees to reveal his secret. Pierce and Chang argue and split up.

Pelton makes a weak attempt to talk to Troy, which fails. Annie takes Britta's phone and learns that Troy sent Britta something nice; she is disgusted that Britta only liked Blade because she thought he was mean. Realizing Annie's deception, Britta tries to leave and meet with Blade, but Jeff arrives and reveals Blade's secret: he is attractive because he cannot feel shame due to brain damage. Jeff explains that they have to learn to not hate themselves. Pierce arrives, asking Annie to take his phone and not let him call Chang. Britta realizes that Troy sent the nice message and smiles.

== Production ==
The episode was written by series creator Dan Harmon and directed by Steven Tsuchida.

Guest star John Goodman made an appearance on the show as part of a recurring role. Kirk Fox, known for his role on another NBC show, Parks and Recreation, also guest-starred as Blade.

== Reception ==
=== Ratings ===
In its original broadcast, the episode was seen by 3.09 million American viewers and achieved a 1.4/4 in the 18-49 demographics. The show placed fourth in its time slot overall behind American Idol, a repeat of The Big Bang Theory, and Missing.

=== Reviews ===
The episode received mostly positive reviews. Emily VanDerWerff of The A.V. Club gave the episode a B+. She praised it for giving everyone in the main ensemble something to do and enjoyed the focus on Britta, but she thought the answer to Blade's mystery and the Pierce-Chang subplot were lackluster. Robert Canning of IGN gave the episode 8.5 out of 10, denoting a "great" episode. He enjoyed Jeff and Britta's plotlines, which he thought added depth and might lead to emotional breakthroughs for both of them. Joshua Kurp of Vulture praised the performances of Gillian Jacobs and Alison Brie but singled out the scene in which Troy texts Britta as one of the show's best. However, he found Jeff's speech at the end to be unnecessary and overdone.
