= The Hook =

Urban legend

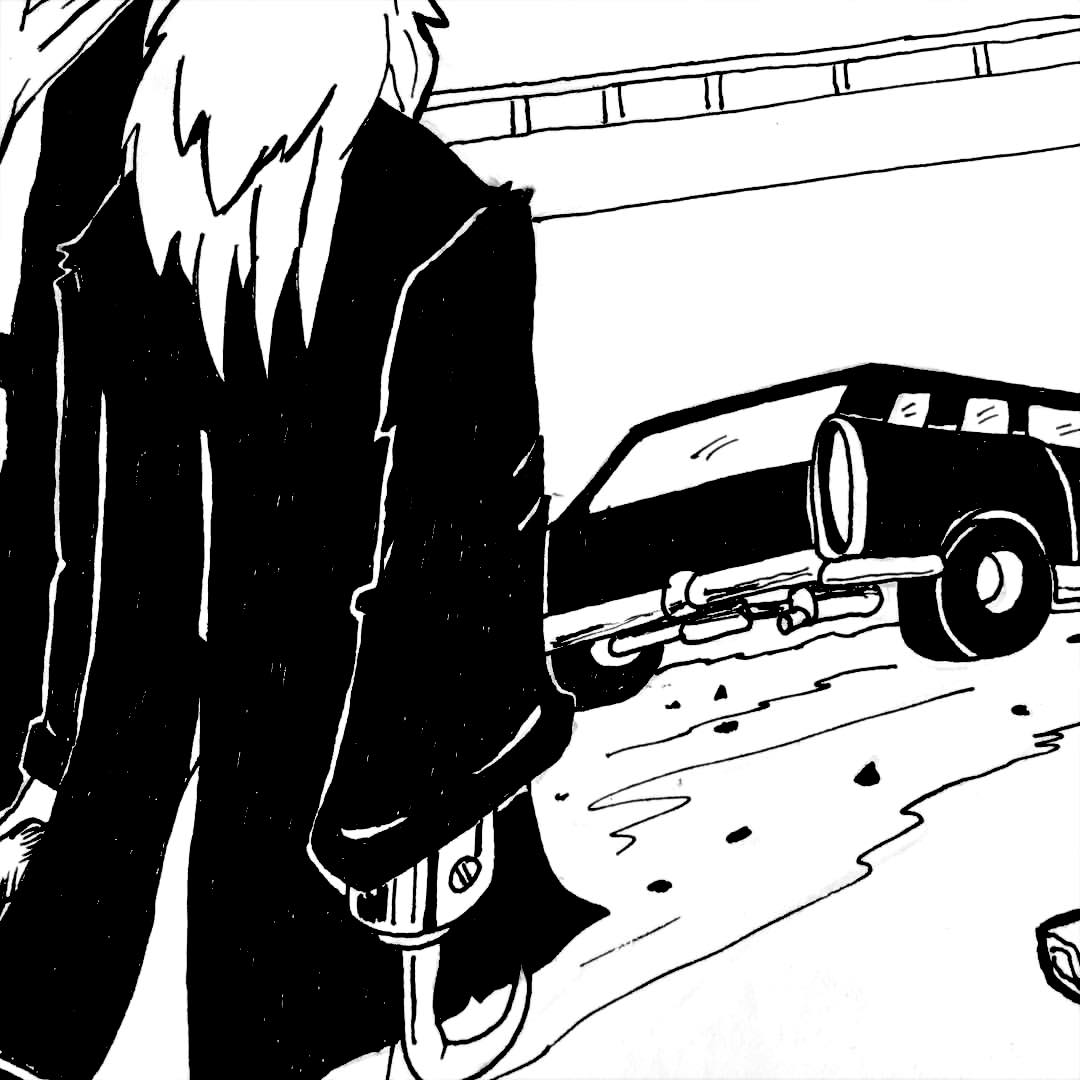
Illustration depicting the Hookman approaching a car

The Hook, or the Hookman, is an American urban legend about a killer with a pirate-like hook for a hand attacking a couple in a parked car.

In many versions of the story, the killer is typically portrayed as a faceless, silhouetted old man wearing a raincoat and rain hat that conceals his features.

The story is thought to date from at least the mid-1950s, and gained significant attention when it was reprinted in the advice column Dear Abby in 1960. It has since become a morality archetype in popular culture, and has been referenced in various horror films.

== Legend ==
The basic premise involves a young couple making out in a car with the radio playing. Suddenly, a news bulletin reports that a serial killer with a hook has just escaped from a nearby institution. For varying reasons, they decide to leave quickly. In the end, once they get back to the woman's house, the killer's hook is either found hanging from the door handle or embedded into the door itself. Different variations include a scraping sound on the car door. Some versions start the same way, but have the couple spotting the killer, warning others, and then narrowly escaping with the killer holding onto the car's roof. In another version, the woman sees a shadowy figure watching the couple from nearby. The man leaves to confront the figure, who then suddenly disappears. Thinking that his date just imagined it, the man returns to the car only to see that the woman has been brutally murdered with a hook.

In an alternate version, the couple drive through an unknown part of the country late at night and stop in the middle of the woods, because either the man has to urinate, or the car breaks down and the man leaves for help. While waiting for him to return, the woman turns on the radio and hears the report of an escaped mental patient. She is then disturbed many times by a thumping on the roof of the car. She eventually exits and sees the escaped patient sitting on the roof, banging the man's severed head on it. Another variation has the woman seeing the man's butchered body suspended upside down from a tree with his fingernails scraping against the roof. In another version of this variation, he's hanging right side up and either his blood is dripping on the roof or his feet are scraping against the roof. In other versions, the man does return to the car only to see his date brutally murdered with a hook embedded in her. Other tales have the woman leaving the car when her date doesn't come back, only to see his mutilated body (either on the car's roof, nailed on a tree, or just a few short steps away). As she starts to panic, she runs into the maniac and is also killed. In another variation of the story, the woman is discovered by police. While being escorted to safety, she is warned not to look behind her. When she does so, she sees the grisly aftermath of the man's murder.

A similar legend recounts that a young couple are heading back from a great date when their car breaks down (either from running out of fuel or a malfunction). The man then decides to head off on foot to find someone to help with the problem while the woman stays behind in the car. She then falls asleep while waiting and wakes up to see a hideous person looking at her through the window. Luckily, the car is locked, so the person can't get inside. But to the woman's horror, the person raises both of his arms to reveal that they are holding her date's severed head in one hand and the car keys in the other. The fate of the woman is never revealed.

== Origin ==
The origins of the Hook legend are not entirely known, though, according to folklorist and historian Jan Harold Brunvand, the story began to circulate some time in the 1950s in the United States. According to Brunvand in The Vanishing Hitchhiker: American Urban Legends and Their Meanings, the story had become widespread amongst American teenagers by 1959, and continued to expand into the 1960s. Snopes writer David Mikkelson has speculated that the legend might have roots in real-life lovers' lane murders, such as the 1946 Texarkana Moonlight Murders.

The first known publication of the story occurred on November 8, 1960, when a reader letter telling the story was reprinted in Dear Abby, a popular advice column:

Dear Abby: If you are interested in teenagers, you will print this story. I don't know whether it's true or not, but it doesn't matter because it served its purpose for me: A fellow and his date pulled into their favorite "lovers lane" to listen to the radio and do a little necking. The music was interrupted by an announcer who said there was an escaped convict in the area who had served time for rape and robbery. He was described as having a hook instead of a right hand. The couple became frightened and drove away. When the boy took his girl home, he went around to open the car door for her. Then he saw—a hook on the door handle! I will never park to make out as long as I live. I hope this does the same for other kids. —Jeanette

Literary scholar Christopher Pittard traces the plot dynamics of the legend to Victorian literature, particularly the 1913 horror novel The Lodger by Marie Adelaide Belloc Lowndes. Though the two narratives have little in common, he notes that both are built upon a "threefold relationship of crime, dirt, and chance... Such a reading also implies a reconsideration of the historical trajectory of the urban legend, usually read as a product of postmodernist consumer culture."

== Interpretations ==
Folklorists have interpreted the long history of this legend in many ways. Alan Dundes's Freudian interpretation explains the hook as a phallic symbol and its amputation as a symbolic castration.

Swedish folklorist Bengt af Klintberg describes the story as an example of "a conflict between representatives of normal people who follow the rules of society and those who are not normal, who deviate and threaten the normal group."

American folklorist Bill Ellis interpreted the maniac in The Hook as a moral custodian who interrupts the sexual experimentation of the young couple. He sees the Hookman's disability as "his own lack of sexuality" and "the threat of the Hookman is not the normal sex drive of teenagers, but the abnormal drive of some adults to keep them apart."

== In popular culture ==
A version of the story by author Alvin Schwartz appears in the 1981 collection of short horror stories for children Scary Stories to Tell in the Dark.

In film, the Hook legend has occasionally appeared: in the 1947 film Dick Tracy's Dilemma, fictional detective Dick Tracy pursues a murderous killer with a hook for a hand. The killer-with-a-hook theme has also appeared in comedies; in Meatballs (1979), Bill Murray's character tells the Hook legend to campers around a campfire. In Shrek the Halls (2007), Gingy tells an alternate version of this legend to his girlfriend Suzy in his flashback. The story has, however, most often been depicted and referenced in horror films. Its prevalence, according to film scholar Mark Kermode, is most reflected in the slasher film, functioning as a morality archetype on youth sexuality. He Knows You're Alone (1980) opens with a film within a film scene in which a young couple are attacked by a killer while in a parked car. The slasher film Final Exam opens with a scene in which a couple are attacked in a parked car, and later, a student is murdered in a university locker room with a hook. Campfire Tales (1997), an anthology horror film, opens with a segment retelling the Hook legend, set in the 1950s. I Know What You Did Last Summer (1997) features a killer stalking teenagers with a hook; at the beginning of the film, the central characters recount the Hook legend around a campfire. The Candyman films of the 1990s, as well as its 2021 Nia DaCosta update, are centered on this legend as well. Lovers Lane (1999) is a slasher film featuring a killer who murders teenagers at a lovers' lane with a hook.

The story has also appeared in various television programs; "The Pest House" (1998), the fourteenth episode of season 2 of the TV series Millennium, opens with a murder similar to that of the urban legend. Season 1, episode 7 of the TV show Supernatural features a hookman as the villain. It is the first story in the first episode of Mostly True Stories?: Urban Legends Revealed. The Canadian animated anthology series Freaky Stories (1997) has a segment in its first season based on the Hook, set in 1963. The story is referenced in "The Slumber Party" episode of Designing Women. The Hookman is used as a plot device in season 3, episode 5 of Community: "Horror Fiction in Seven Spooky Steps".

A parody of the Hookman is used in SpongeBob SquarePants, season 2, episode 16: "Graveyard Shift", in which Squidward, in an attempt to scare SpongeBob out of his wits while they are working at night, tells a made-up horror story of the "Hash-Slinging Slasher" – a dark, faceless figure donning a raincoat who has a rusty, old spatula in place of a hand.

The story received a resurgence in popularity on the internet following a retelling of it on 4chan that became an internet meme, due to it being written in broken English with several humorous errors, most notably its abrupt ending where the entire twist is rendered simply as the phrase "Man door hand hook car door", which has since become how this version of the story is referenced.

== See also ==
- Folklore of the United States

== Bibliography ==
- Armstrong, Kent Bryon (2003). Slasher Films: An International Filmography, 1960 Through 2001. McFarland. ISBN 978-0-786-41462-8.
- Brunvand, Jan Harold (December 17, 2003). The Vanishing Hitchhiker: American Urban Legends & Their Meanings. New York: W.W. Norton & Company.
- Brunvand, Jan Harold (2001). Encyclopedia of Urban Legends. New York: W.W. Norton & Company. ISBN 978-1-59884-720-8.
- Brunvand, Jan Harold (2004). Be Afraid, Be Very Afraid: The Book of Scary Urban Legends. New York: W.W. Norton & Company. ISBN 978-0-393-32613-0.
- Ellis, Bill (1987). "Why Are Verbatim Transcripts of Legends Necessary?". In G. Bennett, P. Smith and J. Widdowson (ed.). Perspectives on Contemporary Legend II. Sheffield Acad. Press. ISBN 978-1-850-75118-2.
- Everman, Welch D. (2003). Cult Horror Films: From Attack of the 50 Foot Woman to Zombies of Mora Tau. Citadel. ISBN 978-0-806-51425-3.
- Harper, Jim (2004). Legacy of Blood: A Comprehensive Guide to Slasher Movies. Critical Vision. ISBN 978-1-900-48639-2.
- Koven, Mikel (2007). Film, Folklore, and Urban Legends. Scarecrow Press. ISBN 978-0-810-86025-4.
- Pittard, Christopher (2011). Purity and Contamination in Late Victorian Detective Fiction. Routledge. ISBN 978-0-754-66813-8.
