= Advanced Gay =

- Community episode
- Episode no.: Season 3 Episode 6
- Directed by: Joe Russo
- Written by: Matt Murray
- Production code: 306
- Original air date: November 3, 2011

Guest appearances
- John Goodman as Robert Laybourne; Jerry Minor as Jerry the Janitor; Larry Cedar as Cornelius Hawthorne; Dan Bakkedahl as Murray; D.J. Pierce as Miss Urbana Champaign

Episode chronology
← Previous "Horror Fiction in Seven Spooky Steps"	Next → "Studies in Modern Movement"
- Community season 3

"Advanced Gay" is the sixth episode of the third season of the American television series Community. It aired originally on November 3, 2011 on NBC.

In the episode, Pierce decides to market Hawthorne Wipes to the gay community, only to be stopped by his skeptic father. This draws the ire of Jeff, who inadvertently exposes his own "daddy issues". Meanwhile, Troy is recruited by Greendale's secret air conditioning repair school.

The episode was written by Matt Murray and directed by Joe Russo. It received mixed critical reviews.

== Plot ==
Urbana Champaign "Pocket Full of Hawthornes" video excerpt.

A video ("Pocket Full of Hawthornes") by drag queen Miss Urbana Champaign (Shangela Laquifa Wadley) devoted to Hawthorne Wipes has made the product popular among the gay community. Pierce decides to cash in on its popularity by launching a new line of wipes—Hawthorne's Pride Wipes—in "Greendale's First Annual Gay Bash". While plans for the party get underway, the event is canceled with the arrival of Pierce's dad, Cornelius (Larry Cedar), who makes several offensive comments towards the group.

Jeff (Joel McHale), who has grown up deeply affected by his father's absence, is furious by Pierce's submission to Cornelius and decides to help Pierce go ahead with the party. Britta (Gillian Jacobs) thinks Pierce and Jeff have Oedipal complexes, although she constantly mispronounces it as "edible complex". Pierce is initially reluctant to disobey his father but relents after receiving a warm welcome from the people at the party. Midway through the party, Cornelius shows up. Out of fear, Pierce declares Hawthorne Wipes a "straights-only" product, much to the disgust of the gay people at the event. When they jeer at him, Pierce collapses, faking a heart attack. At the hospital where Pierce is being treated, Jeff rants at Cornelius for his treatment of Pierce with an impassioned rant seemingly directed at his own absent father. Cornelius himself suffers a heart attack and dies.

Meanwhile, Troy (Donald Glover) impresses Jerry (Jerry Minor), the school plumber, with his seemingly nonchalant talent for plumbing. Jerry warns Troy not to abuse his talent. While walking down the hallway alone, Troy is kidnapped by the secret Air Conditioning Repair School, led by Vice Dean of Air Conditioning, Robert Laybourne (John Goodman). At the school's initiation, Troy is the quickest at assembling an AC unit while blindfolded. This leads to an invitation to join the school by Laybourne, who promises Troy lucrative employment as an AC repairman for life. However, if Troy accepts, he must keep his occupation a secret. Jerry confronts Troy about being approached by the air conditioning school, but Troy rebuffs him. Troy consults Abed (Danny Pudi) about choosing between plumbing and air conditioning. Abed is indifferent, saying that both are similar, but tells Troy to go with what makes him the happiest. Troy says that he just wants to watch TV with Abed.

At Cornelius's funeral (attended by all members of the group), Pierce tells Cornelius to "suck it" in his eulogy. Jeff gains ownership of Cornelius’ ivory toupée. Laybourne meets Troy at the funeral, asking for a decision. Troy declines the invitation, saying his decision is to "watch TV with [his] friend." Laybourne warns Troy that he is making a mistake and vows to keep pursuing him. At the funeral's end, Chang (Ken Jeong) picks up Miss Urbana Champaign and comically derides Jeff for going home alone.

== Production ==
"Advanced Gay" was written by Matt Murray, his first writing credit for the series. It was directed by Joe Russo, his 18th directing credit.

== Cultural references ==
The storyline involving Troy and his talents is a spoof of the 1997 film Good Will Hunting. His initiation ceremony as an air conditioning repairman drew references to Twin Peaks and The Big Lebowski. The vice dean’s speech to Troy about the lifetime commitment to secrecy parodies Men In Black.

Troy and Abed's "Inspector Spacetime" act is a spoof of the television series Doctor Who.

The name of the drag queen, Urbana Champaign, is also the name of a college town in Illinois.

“Cornelius” is Chevy Chase’s given name; in this episode, it is the name of his character’s father.

== Reception ==
=== Ratings ===
In its original broadcast on November 3, 2011, "Advanced Gay" drew an estimated 3.84 million viewers, with a Nielsen rating/share of 1.7/5 in the 18–49 demographic.

=== Reviews ===
The episode received mixed reviews from critics.

Emily VanDerWerff of The A.V. Club gave it a 'B+', saying while "the episode didn’t quite earn all of its emotional moments, but I was impressed with how well it did regardless." She added that the episode's ending was weak. Alan Sepinwall of HitFix praised Goodman's role but found Pierce's father's character too exaggerated. Hollywood.com's Kelsea Stahler said "'Advanced Gay' wasn’t terrible, it just feels like a bit of a letdown after the fantastic 'Remedial Chaos Theory' and the hilarious 'Horror Fiction in Seven Spooky Steps'."

Ethan Alter of Television Without Pity said the episode's A and B stories were "mashed together in a lumpy, misshapen way." He also criticized the stereotypical portrayal of gay characters. Leigh Raines of TV Fanatic said, "By no means is Community opposed to tackling controversial issues and writing non-PC jokes, but this episode was sure to offend just about everyone. Still, I guess that was the point." She rated the episode 3.5/5 stars.
