= Competitive Ecology =

- Community episode
- Episode no.: Season 3 Episode 3
- Directed by: Anthony Russo
- Written by: Maggie Bandur
- Production code: 304
- Original air date: October 6, 2011

Guest appearances
- Michael K. Williams as Professor Kane; David Neher as Todd; Mel Rodriguez as Sgt. Nunez; Eddie Pepitone as Crazy Schmidt; Danielle Kaplowitz as Vicki; Luke Youngblood as Magnitude

Episode chronology
← Previous "Geography of Global Conflict"	Next → "Remedial Chaos Theory"
- Community season 3

"Competitive Ecology" is the third episode of the third season of the American television series Community and the 52nd episode of the series overall. It was originally broadcast on October 6, 2011, on NBC.

== Plot ==
Professor Kane (Michael K. Williams) tells his biology students that their partners for a terrarium project will be the people sitting across from them, pairing the study group with strangers. They ask to form their own pairings, which Kane allows, but Pierce (Chevy Chase) is left with outsider Todd (David Neher). Meanwhile, Chang (Ken Jeong) tells Sgt. Nunez (Mel Rodriguez) he is ready to become a detective, but Nunez shoots him down. In response, Chang delusionally imagines himself as a film noir detective.

The pairings prove dysfunctional – Jeff (Joel McHale) lets Annie (Alison Brie) do all the work, Troy (Donald Glover) and Abed (Danny Pudi) realize they spend too much time together, and Shirley (Yvette Nicole Brown) pesters Britta (Gillian Jacobs) with pictures of her children. The group agrees to consider changing partners. After several proposals are rejected, Jeff suggests they each make a list ranking who they would like to work with; Abed will then determine the optimal pairings.

Chang becomes convinced a matchbook he found is a clue to something. Nunez tells Chang to stop, but he refuses. He assembles a crude evidence board and searches through boxes of matchbooks. When he leaves, a ball of yarn catches fire and destroys the room where he had been living.

The new pairings place Troy with Britta, Annie with Shirley, Todd with Jeff, and Abed with Pierce. When pressed, Abed explains he put the least popular and most popular people together, leading the group members to fight over their popularity. Todd tries to leave, but Jeff stops him. Britta grabs the results list from Abed and lights it on fire, almost killing a turtle Todd found earlier. Todd snaps and berates the group before leaving.

Dean Pelton (Jim Rash) arrives to the scene of the fire. Realizing Chang's living arrangements might be exposed, Pelton urges Sgt. Nunez to not call the police. Nunez quits over this, causing Pelton to promote Chang to head of security. The seven group members arrive in class without completing the project. Angry, Kane reprimands them and tells them they will have to work as one group all year. Afterwards, they struggle to work together until Jeff blames Todd for their problems; the group unites around this.

The end tag shows the group completing personality evaluations for Britta's psychology class. She inadvertently sees male genitals instead of penciled-in bubbles.

== Production ==
The episode was written by producer Maggie Bandur, her first writing credit for the series. It was directed by executive producer Anthony Russo, his 13th directing credit for the series. A number of references are made in this episode to jokes from "Remedial Chaos Theory" (including Pierce sleeping with Eartha Kitt and Shirley's knowledge of Britta's marijuana use), due to a change of the episode order. The revised order is referenced in the latter's opening joke, and was suggested by Gillian Jacobs.

== Reception ==
The episode received positive reviews from the critics. Andrea Towers of TvOverMind wrote, "From the group's teamwork conflicts to Chang's Film Noir, this episode was not only enjoyable in all its plots but also in what it gave us as viewers. It was great to see some reminders that the Troy/Britta relationship is still alive and well (and maybe soon to be even more explored!) and to see the study group calling themselves out on some of their more apparent personality traits in a rather hilarious way that resonated with the audience."

Emily Cheever, of Ology, said of the episode, "I liked this episode not just because of it's [sic] simplicity but also because it really reminded me of last season's episode "Paradigms" which made almost a mockery of the Community formula. But there's really nothing wrong with the formula and it would be a shame for Community to mess with success (or at least, success in the eyes of a fan). Of course, I feel that with the taste of the two part "Paintball" finale last season, Community is going to have to push a little bit harder for an episode that makes me beam with joy."
