= The Go-Go's (British band) =

1960s UK pop band having a novelty single

- Origin: Newcastle, England
- Years active: 1964
- Members: Mike Johnson; Alan Cairns; Abe Harris; Bill Davison; Les McLeian; Brian Davison; Sue Smith

The Go-Go's were a British group from Newcastle. The group is known for their 1964 novelty Christmas single, "I'm Gonna Spend My Christmas with a Dalek".

The single tried to turn the Daleks, an alien race hellbent on "exterminat(ing)" all in its path, into another version of the Alvin and the Chipmunks, with singer Sue Smith putting on a lisping childlike voice. Songwriter and record producer Les Vandyke (working under the pseudonym of Johnny Worth) was largely responsible for the track. Other musicians were Mike Johnson, Alan Cairns, Abe Harris, Bill Davison and Les McLeian.

The song was originally released as one of the many products fuelling Dalekmania but as the craze fizzled out the song was largely forgotten, with snippets occasionally appearing in Doctor Who anthological products. It resurfaced in its entirety on the October 2000 album, Who Is Dr Who.
