= Remedial Chaos Theory =

- Community episode
- Episode no.: Season 3 Episode 4
- Directed by: Jeff Melman
- Written by: Chris McKenna
- Production code: 303
- Original air date: October 13, 2011
- Running time: 21 minutes

Episode chronology
← Previous "Competitive Ecology"	Next → "Horror Fiction in Seven Spooky Steps"
- Community season 3

"Remedial Chaos Theory" is the fourth episode of the third season of the American television series Community. The episode was written by Chris McKenna and directed by Jeff Melman. It originally aired on October 13, 2011 on NBC. It follows a community college study group at a housewarming party for members Troy (Donald Glover) and Abed (Danny Pudi). When Jeff (Joel McHale) throws a die to determine who will go to collect the pizza delivery from downstairs, seven different timelines unfold, showing each member of the group leaving to collect it depending on the outcome of the dice—including the canonical timeline, in which Abed catches it before it lands. The episode was intended to be the third episode of the season, but was delayed by a week due to filming, editing and visual effects overrunning. As a result, "Competitive Ecology", due to be fourth, was aired third.

"Remedial Chaos Theory" is a concept episode, with each timeline depicting how the group is affected by the absence of one of its members. "The Darkest Timeline" ensues when Troy leaves, causing Pierce to be shot and a fire to break out. Further episodes continued plot points from this timeline. The episode received critical acclaim, lauded by fans and critics alike as one of the best episodes of the show. It has been described as one of the best episodes of 2011 and the 2010s. McKenna received a PAAFTJ Award and an Emmy Award nomination for his work on the episode. "Remedial Chaos Theory" also received a Hugo Award nomination.

== Plot ==
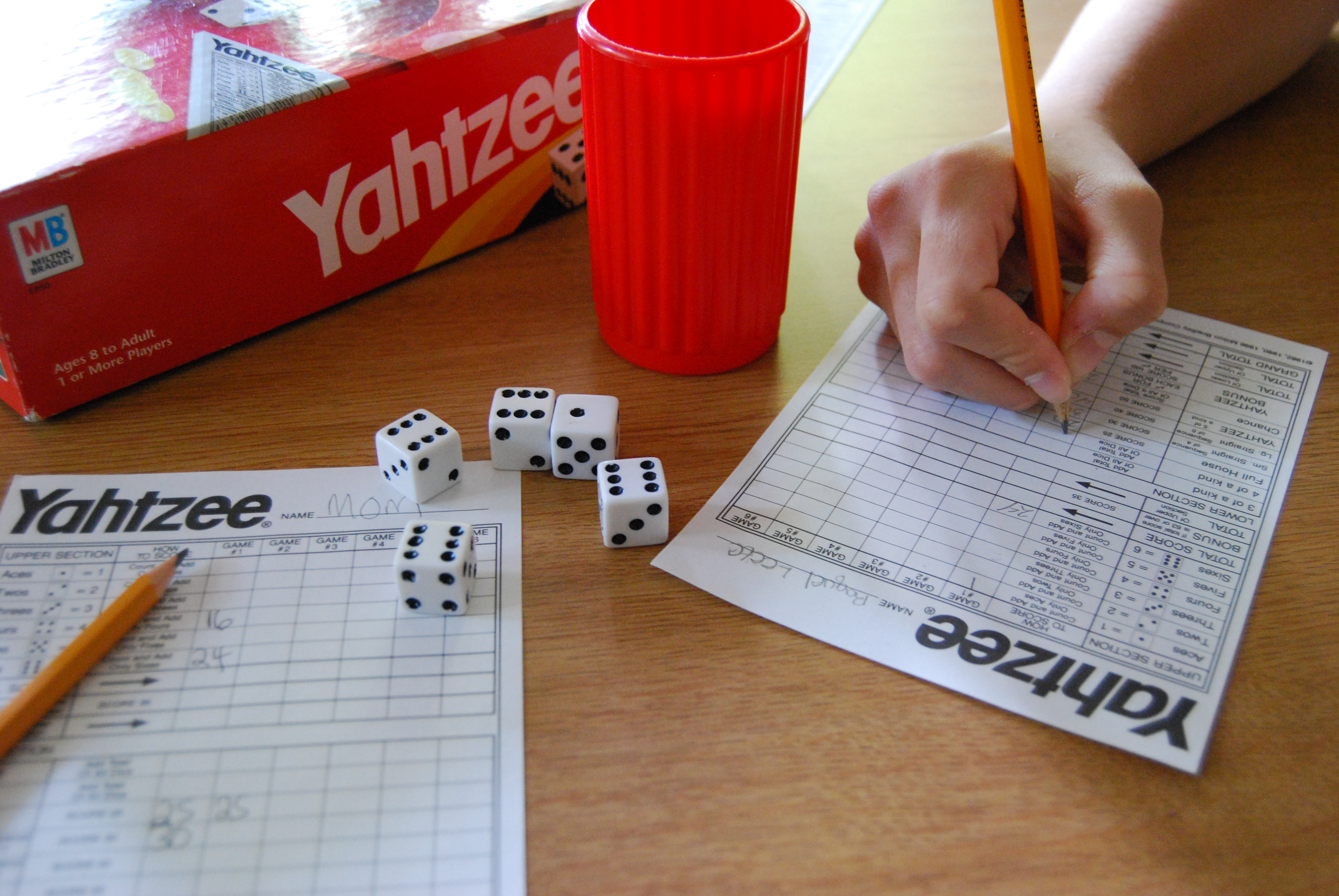
Yahtzee, the dice game that the group begins to play.

Troy (Donald Glover) and Abed (Danny Pudi) invite their study group to a housewarming party at their new apartment. After Abed presents his Raiders of the Lost Ark boulder diorama, the group begin playing Yahtzee. When the pizza delivery arrives, Jeff (Joel McHale) rolls a die to determine who must collect the pizza from the doorman. Abed claims that by doing so, Jeff is creating six different alternative "timelines" depending on the outcome of the roll.

Similar scenes subsequently arise throughout the six timelines, such as Pierce (Chevy Chase) claiming he had sex with Eartha Kitt, Jeff stopping Britta (Gillian Jacobs) from singing along to "Roxanne" (1978), Abed realigning a miniature figurine of Indiana Jones on the diorama that was not upright, Britta smoking marijuana in the bathroom, and Jeff injuring his head on a ceiling fan. When the first roll indicates Annie (Alison Brie) needs to get the pizza, Troy finds a handgun in Annie's bag. Pierce tries to give Troy a present. Annie returns, calling the pizza guy a creep.

The scene is restarted from the dice roll and shows the various timelines, with Jeff rolling a different number each time. It is revealed that the group thinks Shirley (Yvette Nicole Brown) has a baking problem and Pierce's "gift" is a Norwegian troll that he knows Troy is afraid of. When Shirley gets the pizza, the group unintentionally lets her pies burn, so she insults them and exits. When Pierce leaves, Troy unloads to Britta about Jeff making him feel immature. When Britta leaves, Pierce torments Troy with the troll; Britta returns engaged to the pizza guy.

"The Darkest Timeline" arises when Jeff rolls a 1 and Troy leaves. In his haste to get back as quickly as possible and not miss anything, Troy slams the apartment door and knocks the diorama boulder loose. Annie trips over the diorama boulder while attending to Jeff's head injury, and her gun accidentally discharges and shoots Pierce in the leg. Britta drops a joint, starting a fire. Troy returns to find the apartment on fire and the troll staring at him in the middle of all the chaos.

When Abed leaves, Shirley chastises Britta for smoking marijuana, Troy becomes furious at Pierce due to his gift, and Jeff and Annie kiss then argue; everyone but Abed is miserable. In a seventh timeline, Abed catches the die and exposes Jeff's plan: there are seven people and the die is six-sided, so Jeff has devised a system where he never has to collect the pizza. The group makes him do so anyway as punishment and dances to "Roxanne" while he is away. Abed suggests that Annie move into the apartment.

The end tag shows the Darkest Timeline: Shirley is an alcoholic, Pierce died, Annie was sent to a mental health ward, Jeff lost an arm in the fire, Troy lost his larynx trying to eat the troll that was on fire, and Britta put a blue streak in her hair. Abed makes felt goatees for the group, suggesting that they become evil and try to journey to the main timeline.

== Production ==
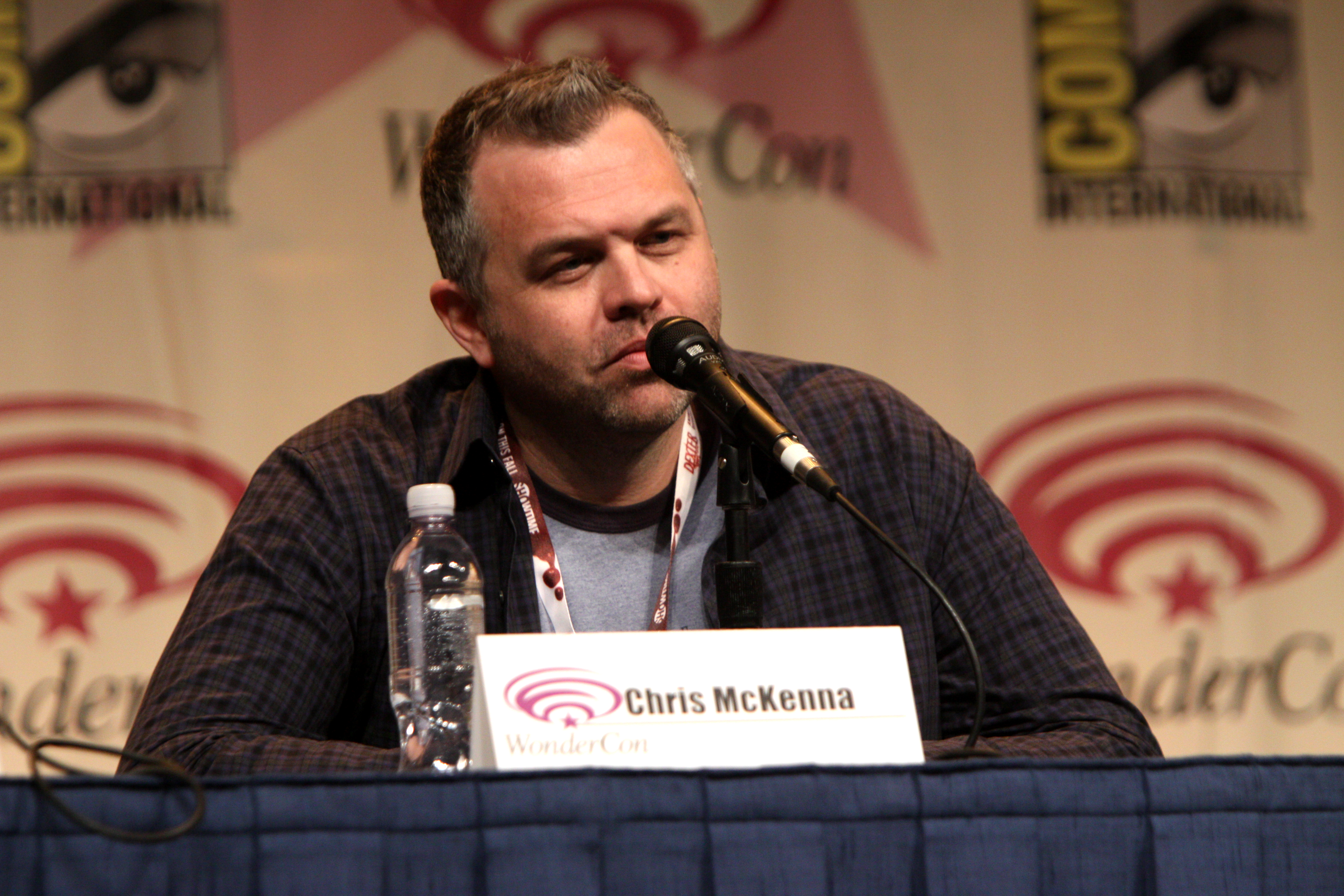
This episode was Chris McKenna's sixth writing credit for Community.

"Remedial Chaos Theory" was broadcast as the fourth episode of the third season. The episode premiered on NBC on October 13, 2011, a Thursday 8 p.m. timeslot. It was written by Chris McKenna, his sixth writing credit of the series. The writers used annotated diagrams, or "story circles", one for each character per timeline, displaying the character's actions in that timeline; series creator Dan Harmon later published images of them on Tumblr. The episode was directed by Jeff Melman.

The episode was originally intended to air as the third episode, but was delayed a week because the episode still needed to be completed, including editing, reshoots, and visual effects. Series creator Dan Harmon wrote that this was his decision, which broadcaster NBC agreed to. A number of jokes from this episode are cited in the episode "Competitive Ecology", which was the actual third episode to air due to the re-ordering. In "Competitive Ecology", Pierce mentions his Eartha Kitt story and Shirley references Britta's marijuana usage. A consequence of the re-ordering was that two consecutive episodes, "Geography of Global Conflict" and "Competitive Ecology", had similar B-plots involving Chang (Ken Jeong) and his security guard storyline. Additionally, the re-ordering meant that the episode following this, "Horror Fiction in Seven Spooky Steps", became the second episode in a row to feature seven different stories. The opening lines of "Remedial Chaos Theory", in which Britta and Annie dispute whether the apartment number is 303 or 304, is a reference to the re-ordering.

Prior to Harmon announcing that the episodes had been reordered, some fans and critics noticed inconsistencies between "Competitive Ecology" and "Remedial Chaos Theory", speculating that the final timeline shown in this episode was not the one that would be followed in future episodes. Harmon commented that the canonical timeline which other episodes continue on from is the final one shown, where Abed prevents the die from landing on a number, saying that no ambiguity was intended.

The song "Roxanne" by The Police plays briefly in several timelines and for a lengthier period in the final one. According to Harmon on audio commentary, licensing of this song used up much of the music budget for the whole third season, leading to the frequent use of "Daybreak" by Michael Haggins and Ludwig Göransson's score for the series in the season's other episodes. However, McHale later said that Harmon often purchased music if the studio refused to, and gave "Roxanne" as an example.

== Themes ==
"Remedial Chaos Theory" is a concept episode. Some critics commented that there was an absence of an overarching plot. Storylines play out across timelines, such as Pierce being jealous that Troy moves out of his mansion to live with Abed. Other details like Troy and Abed putting a bowl of olives by their toilet occur repeatedly.

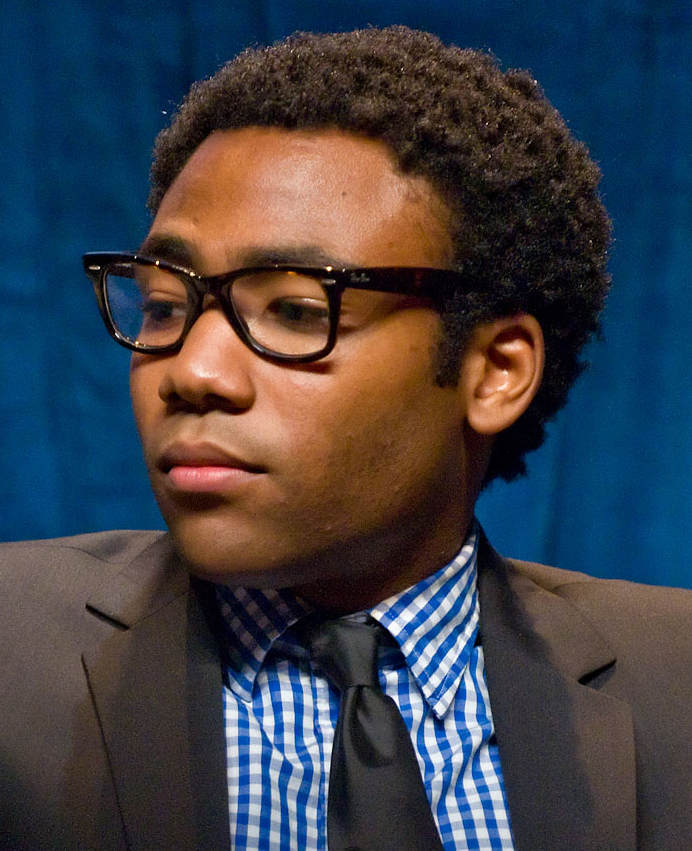
When Troy, played by Donald Glover, leaves to get the pizza, a series of disasters ensues; this is referred to as "The Darkest Timeline".

Critics found that each timeline shows how the absence of any member of the group would significantly disrupt or affect the others, variously interpreting each timeline. The "Darkest Timeline" arises when Troy leaves the group to get the pizza. Critics have commented that this indicates that Troy is the group's linchpin, without whom the group descends into chaos, or that Troy should be the leader of the group rather than Jeff. Some critics found that Annie has a caretaker role, despite struggling to take care of herself, whilst Shirley is a mother figure as the other characters do not take responsibility for their actions. Joshua Kurp of Vulture opined that without Pierce, Jeff feels insecure about being the oldest. Others found that Troy tries to act mature around Britta, and wants Jeff to view him as an adult, but is immature when just with Abed. In regards to Abed, it was suggested that his meta-commentary on the group allows them to confront their issues. Though Jeff's consistent interruption of Britta as she tries to sing "Roxanne" initially seems like a joke on her, it is a joke at the expense of Jeff, as the rest of the group happily join in when he is the one to get the pizza. According to some critics, the group would be better off without Jeff.

Commentary was made on the episode's allusions to other media, and its usage of props. Similar to the 1993 comedy film Groundhog Day, in which a character is repeatedly woken up to the same song to indicate the same day occurring over and over again, "Remedial Chaos Theory" uses a song—"Roxanne" by The Police—to mark the start of a new timeline. The Darkest Timeline was compared to the Star Trek episode "Mirror, Mirror", in which characters battle evil versions of themselves. Annie's gun is a Smith & Wesson, which David Mello of Screen Rant reported would not discharge in the way depicted in the Darkest Timeline. Pierce's Serbian rum has a Cyrillic label reading "generic rum". Some of Abed's bedroom decorations, such as a Kickpuncher poster, were previously shown in his season one college accommodation.

Later episodes drew on plot points from "Remedial Chaos Theory", such as the Darkest Timeline, which the episode also popularized as a pop culture phrase. Evil Abed reappears briefly in the season three episodes "Contemporary Impressionists" and the finale "Introduction to Finality". In the former, Abed briefly hallucinates Evil Abed, and in the latter he begins to act as Evil Abed when it looks like he will lose Troy as a friend. The fourth season finale, "Advanced Introduction to Finality", has a storyline built around the evil characters from the Darkest Timeline invading the canonical timeline. In the end tag of that episode, Evil Troy and Evil Abed host "Troy and Abed in the Morning" with Chang and visit the "5" timeline.

== Reception ==
=== Ratings ===
In its original broadcast on October 13, 2011, the episode was viewed by an estimated 3.82 million people, up 13 percent from the previous week. It had a Nielsen rating of 1.7 in the 18–49 demographic. After factoring in seven-day DVR viewership, the episode received a 2.4 rating in the 18–49 demographic.

=== Critical reviews ===
Whilst critical reception to the first three episodes of the season were generally lukewarm, "Remedial Chaos Theory" received critical acclaim, and remains a favorite episode amongst both fans and critics. Reviews at the time include an A rating in The A.V. Club, a rating of ten out of ten in IGN and a rating of 4.5 out of five stars in TV Fanatic. Adam Quigley of /Film found it the best episode of the program up to that point. Critics praised the episode's structure and the show's return to a high-concept episode. Kelsea Stahler of Hollywood.com praised that after the first three episodes of the season, the show revisited "experimental, high-concept television laced with absurd comedy".

Aspects of the episode highlighted for praise included the attention to detail and intricacy in the alternate timelines. Emily St. James of The A.V. Club praised the episode as simultaneously "silly, moving and revelatory". The episode's end tag and Darkest Timeline scene were received positively. Ken Tucker of Entertainment Weekly found that the episode was well-acted by each cast member. Alan Sepinwall of Hitfix praised the episode for its detailed depiction of the relationship between each of the characters in the group. Sepinwall further praised the episode's humor. Robert Canning of IGN found that the episode "told a great story, it satirized a specific aspect of pop culture and it, above all else, was full of laughs."

Later reviews of the episode were also positive. The episode ranks highly in lists of the best Community episodes. In Cory Barker's ranking for TV.com of all 110 episodes of the series, "Remedial Chaos Theory" was listed first overall, with the description "smart, narratively inventive, constantly funny, and somehow still couched in character relationships". The episode also appears in some critics' lists of the best television episodes of the year or decade. James Poniewozik of Time included it in a list of the ten best television episodes of 2011. Adam Chitwood found that the episode stood out amongst the Community episodes of the year, ranking the show fourth on his list of best television programs of 2011. Ranking it as the tenth-best television episode of the 2010s, Sadaf Ahsan of the National Post praised it as "effortlessly funny". Melanie McFarland of Salon, ranking it as the best episode of 2011, lauded it for "extraordinarily merging scientific theory, sci-fi, and reality". Gwynne Watkins of Parade reviewed the episode as "fast-moving and laugh-out-loud funny" in a list of the top 20 television episodes of the 2010s. The Ringer listed it as one of the 100 best television episodes since 2000, calling it the moment when the show shifted from a "quirky middle-of-the-lineup sitcom" to "experimental art". In 2024, Rolling Stone's Alan Sepinwall listed it as the 15th best TV episode of all time.

=== Awards and nominations ===
In 2012, the episode received two nominations and one award.

List of awards and nominations received by "Remedial Chaos Theory"
Year	Award	Category	Recipients	Result	Ref.
2012	Primetime Emmy Awards	Outstanding Writing for a Comedy Series	Chris McKenna	Nominated	
2012	Hugo Awards	Best Dramatic Presentation, Short Form	Dan Harmon and Chris McKenna (writers); Jeff Melman (director)	Nominated	
2012	PAAFTJ Television Award	Best Writing for a Comedy Series	Chris McKenna	Won	
