= Hearts of Darkness: A Filmmaker's Apocalypse =

1991 American documentary film

- Theatrical release poster
- Directed by: Fax Bahr; George Hickenlooper; Documentary footage: Eleanor Coppola
- Written by: Fax Bahr; George Hickenlooper
- Produced by: George Zaloom; Les Mayfield
- Starring: Eleanor Coppola; Francis Ford Coppola; Robert Duvall; Dennis Hopper; George Lucas; John Milius; Martin Sheen
- Edited by: Michael Greer; Jay Miracle
- Music by: Todd Boekelheide
- Production companies: Zaloom Mayfield Productions; Zoetrope Studios
- Distributed by: Triton Pictures
- Release date: November 27, 1991
- Running time: 96 minutes
- Country: United States
- Language: English

Hearts of Darkness: A Filmmaker's Apocalypse is a 1991 American documentary film by Fax Bahr and George Hickenlooper about the production of Apocalypse Now, a 1979 Vietnam War epic directed by Francis Ford Coppola. It received widespread praise from critics.

== Synopsis ==
Hearts of Darkness chronicles how production problems—among them bad weather, actors' poor health, and other issues—delayed the filming of Apocalypse Now, increasing costs and nearly destroying the life and career of its director, Francis Ford Coppola.

== Production ==
The documentary was begun by Coppola's wife, Eleanor Coppola, who narrated behind-the-scenes footage. In 1990, Coppola turned her material over to two young filmmakers, George Hickenlooper and Fax Bahr (co-creator of MADtv), who subsequently shot new interviews with the original cast and crew, and intercut them with Eleanor Coppola's material. After a year of editing, Hickenlooper, Bahr, and Coppola debuted their film at the 1991 Cannes Film Festival.

The title is derived from the Joseph Conrad 1899 novella Heart of Darkness, the source material for Apocalypse Now.

== Release ==
Originally aired on the Showtime Network in the United States, Hearts of Darkness was released by Paramount Home Video on VHS and LaserDisc in 1992, with further re-releases occurring in 1994 and 1998. Paramount later released the film on DVD on November 20, 2007. That version includes a commentary track from both Eleanor and Francis Ford Coppola, recorded separately, and a bonus documentary entitled Coda, about Coppola's film Youth Without Youth.

The film is also available on Blu-ray in the Full Disclosure (2010) and Final Cut (2019) editions of Apocalypse Now.

== Reception ==
=== Critical response ===
On the review aggregator website Rotten Tomatoes, 100% of 33 critics' reviews are positive, with an average rating of 8.7/10. The website's consensus reads: "Chronicling the filming of Apocalypse Now through Eleanor Coppola's empathetic and frank point of view, Hearts of Darkness is a revelatory investigation of moviemaking and how creative obsession can impact an artist's family." Metacritic, which uses a weighted average, assigned the film a score of 95 out of 100, based on seven critics, indicating "universal acclaim".

=== Accolades ===
Hearts of Darkness received several accolades, among them the National Board of Review award for Best Documentary, 1991; an American Cinema Editors society award for Best Edited Documentary (1992); two Emmy Awards for "Outstanding Individual Achievement - Informational Programming - Directing" and "Outstanding Individual Achievement - Informational Programming - Picture Editing" (1992), and the International Documentary Association award (1992). Critic Gene Siskel listed it as the best movie of 1991.

== In popular culture ==
- A quote from the Coppola interview shown at the beginning of the film ("We were in the jungle, there were too many of us, we had access to too much money, too much equipment, and little by little we went insane") is sampled in UNKLE's song "UNKLE (Main Title Theme)", and also in the Cabaret Voltaire song "Project80" (as part of a larger sample from that interview).
- Hearts of Dartmouth: Life of a Trailer Park Girl is a documentary about the making of the TV series Trailer Park Boys. It was directed and narrated by Annemarie Cassidy, then-wife of Trailer Park Boys director Mike Clattenburg.
- An episode of the cartoon Animaniacs, "Hearts of Twilight", was a parody of the documentary.
- In the TV comedy Community, the documentary is the basis of the episode "Documentary Filmmaking: Redux" in which the character of Abed makes a Behind the Scenes documentary on the creation of a commercial for the Community College with Dean Pelton being the commercial's director who becomes erratic as the commercial's production goes out of control. Several characters, including guest star Luis Guzmán, say the line, "'Yea but haven't you seen Hearts of Darkness? Way better than Apocalypse Now."
- On the DVD commentary of Good Will Hunting, Matt Damon and Ben Affleck reveal that Casey Affleck's line "I swallowed a bug" is a reference to Marlon Brando's line in the documentary. In the Joss Whedon film Serenity, River Tam has the same line.
- The 2008 comedy Tropic Thunder parodies both Hearts of Darkness and Apocalypse Now.

== See also ==
- Making Marie Antoinette (2026)
