= Biology 101 =

- Community episode
- Episode no.: Season 3 Episode 1
- Directed by: Anthony Russo
- Written by: Garrett Donovan & Neil Goldman
- Production code: 301
- Original air date: September 22, 2011

Guest appearances
- John Goodman as Vice Dean Robert Laybourne; Michael K. Williams as Professor Marshall Kane; Mel Rodriguez as Sgt. Nunez; Richard Erdman as Leonard; Dino Stamatopoulos as Star-Burns

Episode chronology
← Previous "For a Few Paintballs More"	Next → "Geography of Global Conflict"
- Community season 3

"Biology 101" is the third season premiere of Community and the 50th episode of the series overall. The episode originally aired on September 22, 2011 on NBC. The episode was written by Neil Goldman and Garrett Donovan and directed by Anthony Russo.

The episode picks up where the second season left off, with Pierce out of the group. The study group resumes class at Greendale and decides to enroll in biology, but when Jeff is kicked out of the class, he struggles to remain friends with the others. Meanwhile, Dean Pelton runs into trouble as he attempts to improve the school, and Abed searches for new television shows to watch.

The episode was seen by approximately 4.00 million Americans in its original airing. It received generally positive reviews.

== Plot ==
Jeff (Joel McHale) daydreams about an ideal new year in the style of a musical. When Pierce (Chevy Chase) returns and asks to rejoin the group, Jeff resists, arguing they can be friends outside the study group. Abed (Danny Pudi) panics when he learns Cougar Town has been pushed to mid-season. In the group's first biology class, Professor Kane (Michael K. Williams) kicks Jeff out over his phone.

Dean Pelton (Jim Rash), seeking to improve Greendale, orders the removal of the monkey in the air vents using knockout gas. He confronts Vice Dean Laybourne (John Goodman) over the Air Conditioning Repair Annex's spending; Laybourne invites Pelton to his office later. Britta (Gillian Jacobs) shows Abed Cougarton Abbey, the inspiration for Cougar Town. Jeff searches for a new class for the group, but Annie (Alison Brie) uses Jeff's earlier speech to argue they do not have to take a class together. As Jeff leaves, Pierce announces he is now in biology due to Jeff's expulsion.

Abed discovers Cougarton Abbey only has six episodes and panics again. Jeff, feeling isolated, sees Chang (Ken Jeong) living in the vents and realizes he needs to rejoin the group. Pelton meets with Laybourne, who explains that his annex is highly successful and forces Pelton to stop interfering. Jeff asks Kane about rejoining biology; Kane tells Jeff to give up the phone and to stop closing himself off. Jeff, noticing a picture of Pierce, becomes convinced that Pierce bribed Kane. He grabs the photo to show to the group, but Chang steals it. Jeff follows Chang into the vents and is knocked out by the "monkey gas".

Britta introduces Abed to Inspector Spacetime, a long-running series. Jeff, disheveled from the gas, arrives with the picture, but it shows Pierce with a different Black person. Jeff struggles to defend himself; enraged, he attacks the study table with an axe. Pelton arrives and announces Greendale will not be changing apart from budget cuts forced by Laybourne. The cuts cause most of the school's security to quit, leading Pelton to hire Chang as a guard in return for housing.

The group confronts Jeff, but Pierce confesses to bribing Kane. The rest of the group turns on Pierce, but Jeff convinces them to allow Pierce back in, realizing Pierce is lying for him. When Annie asks what Jeff will do now, he expresses confidence that a seat in biology will open, which happens when Star-Burns (Dino Stamatopoulos) approaches Kane about drug dealing.

== Production ==
The episode was written by executive producers Neil Goldman and Garrett Donovan, their first writing credit for the series. It was directed by executive producer Anthony Russo, his 12th directing credit for the series.

The episode was the first to bill Jim Rash in the opening credits as part of the main cast. It was also the first episode to feature John Goodman and Michael K. Williams as guest stars.

== Cultural references ==
Two Stanley Kubrick films are referenced in this episode. In the first instance, Jeff's hallucination after being subdued by the monkey gas resembles David Bowman's final moments in the film 2001: A Space Odyssey. Later, Jeff attacking the table with an axe while covered in white dust is a reference to the film The Shining.

== Reception ==
=== Ratings ===
In its original American broadcast on September 22, 2011, "Biology 101" was viewed by an estimated 4.00 million viewers with a Nielsen rating of 1.7 in the 18–49 demographic.

=== Reviews ===
"Biology 101" received generally positive reviews from critics. Emily VanDerWerff of The A.V. Club gave the episode a B+, who found it amusing and enjoyed the "slightly melancholy moments"; she noted that the show was clearly setting up big ideas for the season. Robert Canning of IGN deemed it "a tight premiere episode" and gave it 8 out of 10, denoting a "great" episode; he enjoyed Pierce's actions in the main plot and the performances of Goodman and Williams.
