= Geography of Global Conflict =

- Community episode
- Episode no.: Season 3 Episode 2
- Directed by: Joe Russo
- Written by: Andy Bobrow
- Production code: 302
- Original air date: September 29, 2011

Guest appearances
- Martin Starr as Professor Cligoris; Irene Choi as Annie Kim; Mel Rodriguez as Sgt. Nunez; Erik Charles Nielsen as Garrett; Danielle Kaplowitz as Vicki

Episode chronology
← Previous "Biology 101"	Next → "Competitive Ecology"
- Community season 3

"Geography of Global Conflict" is the second episode of the third season of the American television series Community. It was originally broadcast on September 29, 2011 on NBC.

== Plot ==
Annie (Alison Brie) is shocked to discover a fellow student, Annie Kim (Irene Choi), is just as smart, perky, and tenacious as she is, and has already won over the favor of their political science class teacher, Professor Cligoris (Martin Starr). Annie brings Other Annie to the study group, hoping to make friends with her, but instead the two get into a verbal battle of oneupmanship, wherein Annie claims she will start a Model United Nations at Greendale. The next day, Annie discovers that Other Annie has stolen her idea of the Model UN; Jeff (Joel McHale) offers to intercede and they discuss the issue with Cligoris. Professor Cligoris says there is room at Greendale for only one Model UN and offers to moderate a competition between Annie's UN-the study group, sans Britta (Gillian Jacobs)-and Other Annie's.

Britta, meanwhile, has become more committed to her studies, but panics when she reads of a former friend who is now in prison in Syria. She feels guilty for getting a "new life" while her friend is being tortured and starts to act rambunctiously, kicking a trash can and staging a demonstration. Newly appointed security guard Chang (Ken Jeong) is happy for the opportunity to exercise his power, but Britta reluctantly denies that she will actually break a law, preventing Chang from detaining her.

As the Model UN challenge begins, Abed (Danny Pudi) wonders how there can be two UNs, and Cligoris suggests that each UN represents a parallel world. The two teams are given random conflicts and scored on their ability to collaborate on resolutions. Annie and the study group are on track to win until they are distracted by a fart to which no one will admit. Annie gets upset at the group; Jeff tells her she's acting like a schoolgirl "but not in a hot way", causing her to run away. Jeff follows her to the study room and apologizes. Annie worries that she is being immature, but Jeff assures her that he does not think so. They realize they have romantic feelings for each other but decide to stay at a comfortable distance and return to the competition. Now close to losing, they implement a plan devised by Abed: walking up to Other Annie's UN, they offer to open diplomatic relations as representatives from their parallel world. Other Annie rebuffs them, but Professor Cligoris decrees that Annie's team was making exactly the sort of high-minded meaningless gesture that the real UN is dedicated to and declares them the winners.

Their celebration is interrupted as Britta, covered in dolls, disrupts the proceedings. Chang happily tases her for causing a disturbance and carries her away.

== Production ==
The episode was written by producer Andy Bobrow, his fourth writing credit for the series. It was directed by executive producer Joe Russo, his 17th directing credit for the series.

== Reception ==
The episode received positive reviews from critics. Steve Heisler, of NYMag, said of the episode, "The problem I’ve always had with Community — admittedly a minor one —is that it’s often so obsessed with wit and style that the show reads as disingenuous. Sure, they’re a hell of a lot of fun, but episodes can feel empty without pathos or a real, grounded sense of empathy. But as last week’s show-stopping musical number promised, this is a whole new Community, and the show is ready to make amends for its past mistakes. (I’m choosing to ignore the part where the dean said the show was going to be just like last year, only with less money.) “Geography of Global Conflict” wasn’t necessarily an unstoppable joke machine like Community at its best, nor was it a tear gas-canister full of emotion. But the episode teased what will likely carry on throughout the season: a reevaluation of character relationships and maybe, just maybe, some real heart. And Tasering."

In its original broadcast, "Geography of Global Conflict" reached nearly 4.1 million households, with a 1.8/5 share in the 18-49 demographic.
