= List of Doctor Who parodies =

The long-running science fiction television series Doctor Who has been the subject of many parodies over the years. Following are some of the notable Doctor Who parodies.

== Books ==
- The Doctor and the Enterprise by Jean Airey. (New Media Press, 1985) ISBN 0-8095-8102-7, first serialized six issues of Enterprise, a Star Trek fanzine.
- Doctor Whom: or ET Shoots and Leaves: The Zero Tolerance Approach to Parodication by A. R. R. R. Roberts (Gollancz, 2006) ISBN 0-575-07928-2
- Now We Are Six Hundred: A Collection of Time Lord Verse by James Goss, illustrated by Russell T. Davies (BBC Books/Ebury Publishing, 2017) ISBN 978-1-78594-271-6

== Comic books ==
- It's Even Bigger on the Inside by Tim Quinn and Dicky Howett (Miwk Publishing, 2015) ISBN 978-1908630414
- Whoah! Eight Years of Bizarre Cartoons from the Pages of Doctor Who Magazine by Jamie Lenman (Miwk Publishing, 2019) ISBN 978-1-908630-73-5

== Film shorts ==
- Do You Have a License to Save This Planet?, BBV Productions
- "The Ballad of Russell and Julie", The Hillywood Show, made for the wrap party after David Tennant's last episode
- Hitchhiker’s Guide to the Daleks (2009), by Andrew Orton
- Japanese Doctor Who (2014), by filmmaker Joshua Kahan
- Reign of Turner (1989), by Steven Warren Hill, Jennifer Adams Kelley, and Robert Warnock
- “The Silurian Disruption”, French and Saunders outtake included in The Curse of Fatal Death (VHS)

== Music ==
- "Doctorin' the Tardis" by The Timelords (KLF Communications,1988, U.S. reissue 1991)
- "I'm Gonna Spend My Christmas with a Dalek" by The Go-Go's

== Radio ==
- "Professxor Prune and the Electric Time Trousers" I'm Sorry, I'll Read That Again, series 7, episode 1–13 (BBC Radio 1 and 2, 1969)
- "Whatever Happened to Susan Foreman?", Whatever Happened to... by Adrian Mourby (BBC Radio, 1994)

== Short stories ==
- "The Tardis at Pooh Corner" by Peter David, written 1983, published online 2002

== Television ==
- "Biology 101", Community, season 3, episode (NBC, 2011), introduces a fictitious television, Inspector Spacetime, that is a parody of Tom Baker portraying Doctor Who
- The Chaser’s War On Everything (ABC TV, 2006), spoof song in series one
- "Christmas with the Doctor(s), Dead Ringers (BBC Two, 2005)
- The Curse of the Fatal Death (BBC One, 1999) written by Stephen Moffat as a Comic Relief special
- "Doctor Who", Tonight's the Night (BBC One, 2009), featured John Barrowman and David Tennant (BBC One, 2009)
- "Doctor Who Meets The Nerd", Robot Chicken on Adult Swim (Cartoon Network, 2014)
- Doctor Who Night (BBC, 1999), featured numerous parody sketches, including:
  - "The Kidnappers", David Walliams and Mark Gatiss
  - "The Pitch of Fear", David Walliams and Mark Gatiss
  - "The Web of Caves", David Walliams and Mark Gatiss
- "The Eurostar", Dead Ringers (BBC Two), parody of Tom Baker
- "Facing Thatchos", The Lenny Henry Show, series one (BBC One, 1984)
- The Five(ish) Doctors Reboot (BBC Red Button, 2013), created by Peter Davison for the fiftieth anniversary of Doctor Who
- "Hello My Dalek", Crackerjack (BBC One, 1975)
- It's a Square World, season six, episode 3, featured Clive Dunn as (BBC, 1963)
- "Pakistani Daleks", Q... (1974) by Spike Milligan
- "Space / Time", Comic Relief (BBC One, 2011)
- "Time Crash" Children in Need 2007 (BBC One and BBC Two, 2007)
- "Doctor Time Space and the Continuums", Codename: Kids Next Door, season 3, episode 11b "Operation: U.N.C.O.O.L." (Cartoon Network, 2004)

== Video games ==
- Hugo II, Whodunit? (Gray Design Associates, 1991), features a secondary character called the Doctor who has a "sonar screwdriver"

== Web series ==
- Doctor Whore (2014), pornographic parody
- How It Should Have Ended (HiShe)
  - "Doctor Who: How Doomsday Should Have Ended", no. 86 (November 18, 2013)
  - "Super Café: Who’s a Hero" season 5, Super Cafe series no. 8 (November 21, 2013)
- Untitled Web Series About a Space Traveler Who Can Also Travel Through Time, aka Inspector Spacetime (The Travis Richey Channel on YouTube, 2012), based the fictitious Inspector Spacetime introduced on the television series Community
