= Michael Haggins =

American bassist and songwriter

- Born: Pasadena, California, U.S.
- Occupation: Musician
- Instrument: Bass
- Labels: Cuate
- Website: www.michaelhaggins.com

Michael Haggins is an American bassist and songwriter.

Haggins has worked and recorded with many artists while also working in the network television industry for NBC, ABC, CBS. His sound combines funk and smooth jazz, having been inspired by Stanley Clarke, Isley Brothers, George Duke, and Earth Wind & Fire.

His debut album was Daybreak followed by Traffic. In 2011 he released a new single "In Your Lifetime". Haggins records on the independent label Cuate Records.

== Early life and education ==
Haggins got his first guitar at age 8 for Christmas and played the alto saxophone in his school band when he was 11. He eventually studied jazz at Pasadena City College and went on to major in communications at California State University, Long Beach, with a focus on radio/television. He had also worked with network television for some time, editing shows like The Cosby Show and Dr. Phil. He played with some local bands until deciding in the early 2000s to pursue his music career, after being encouraged by his uncle, Al Duncan.

== Music in TV and films ==
Haggins' song "Daybreak" has been featured on Community, where Troy (Donald Glover), Abed (Danny Pudi), Shirley (Yvette Nicole Brown), and Annie (Alison Brie) have hummed it on different occasions. (Season 3, episodes 5, 9, 11, 12, 13 and 16; season 4, episodes 2, 4, 5 and 9; and season 6, episodes 6 and 11). "Be Thankful", from the same album, was used in season 5, episode 9, as well.

His music has also been featured in 2011 Twentieth Century Fox film Hall Pass, the ABC primetime series Happy Endings, MSNBC'S Wake Up With Al, the Fox Television primetime series Raising Hope, daytime and primetime television on The Weather Channel, and Los Angeles television station KTLA 5 Morning News.

== Discography ==
- 2004 Daybreak
- 2008 Traffic
- 2012 World of Dreams
- 2015 Dare to Dream
