= Chris McKenna (writer) =

American television and film writer and producer

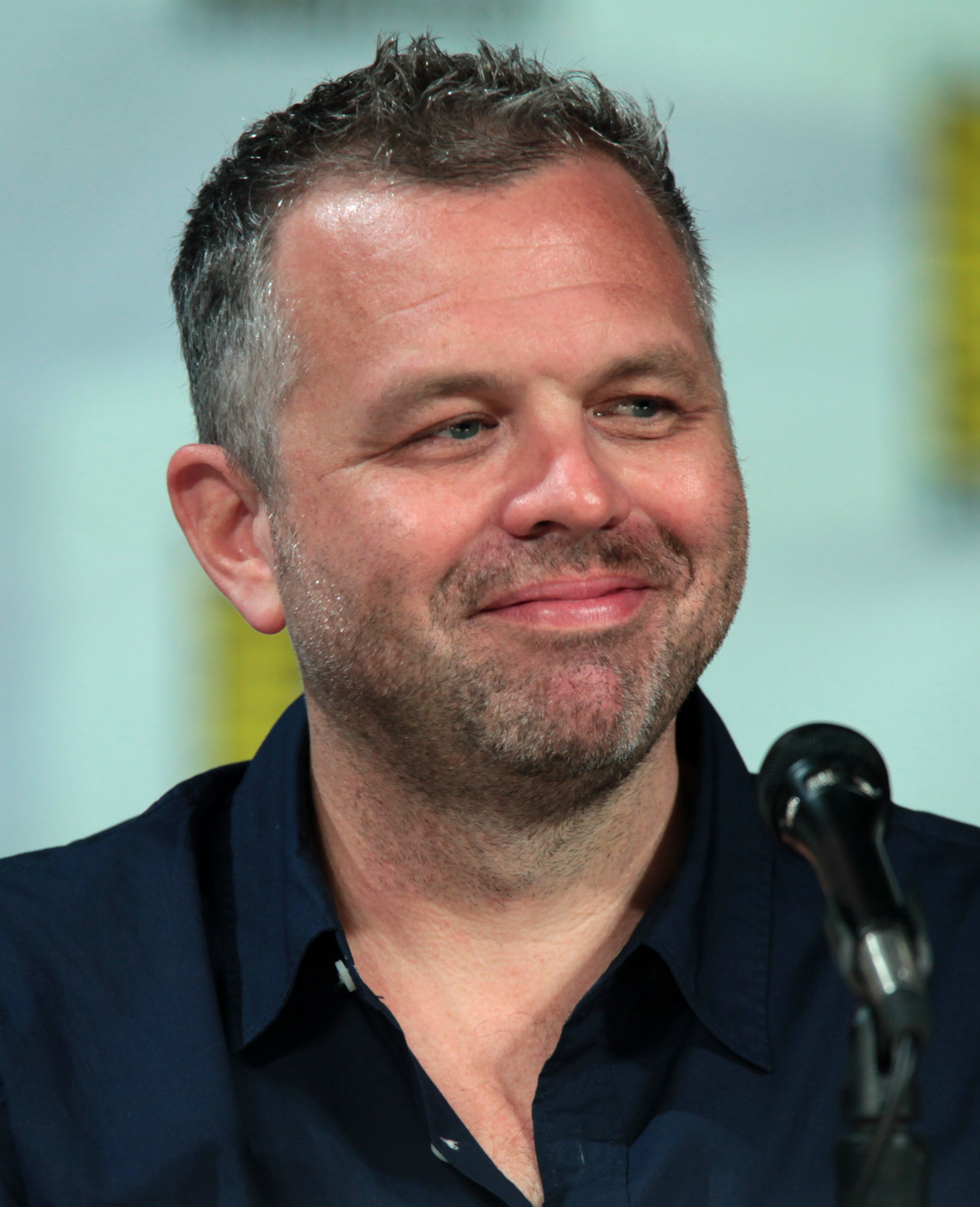
- McKenna on a Community panel at San Diego Comic-Con in July 2014.
- Occupations: Television writer, film producer, screenwriter, television producer
- Years active: 1993–present

Chris McKenna is an American television writer, film producer, screenwriter, and television producer. He has written for American Dad!, Community,, Igor, and The Mindy Project, and the Spider-Man films set in the Marvel Cinematic Universe (2017–present).

== Early life ==
McKenna attended The Bishop's School in San Diego, California, and graduated from Stanford University in 1992.

== Career ==
McKenna was an uncredited writer on the 2004 film The Girl Next Door, having developed the screenplay with director Luke Greenfield. He was denied credit by the WGA arbitration process.

McKenna wrote some of Community's most critically acclaimed episodes, including "Paradigms of Human Memory", "Conspiracy Theories and Interior Design", and the Emmy- and Hugo-nominated "Remedial Chaos Theory". He also co-wrote (along with his brother Matt McKenna) one of the most acclaimed episodes of American Dad!, "Rapture's Delight".

During his time as a writer for American Dad, he met Erik Sommers, who would later become his writing partner. Together they have since written for The Lego Batman Movie (2017), co-writing Spider-Man: Homecoming (2017) and its sequels, Far From Home (2019), No Way Home (2021), and Brand New Day (2026) along with Jumanji: Welcome to the Jungle (2017) and Ant-Man and the Wasp (2018).

Having worked with the Russo brothers on the sitcom Community, McKenna contributed to the script of Captain America: The Winter Soldier (2014) by writing jokes for the film.

On August 7, 2026 Mckenna and his partner Sommers, were announced to have been added to the writing team of Avengers: Doomsday and Avengers: Secret Wars, alongside Michael Waldron, and Stephen McFreely.

=== Film ===
Writer

- The Girl Next Door (2004, uncredited)
- Igor (2008)
- The Lego Batman Movie (2017)
- Spider-Man: Homecoming (2017)
- Jumanji: Welcome to the Jungle (2017)
- Ant-Man and the Wasp (2018)
- Spider-Man: Far From Home (2019)
- Spider-Man: No Way Home (2021)
- Ghosted (2023)
- Spider-Man: Brand New Day (2026)
- Avengers: Doomsday (2026, uncredited)

Assistant

- The Thing Called Love (1993)
- Little Miss Millions (1993) (Production assistant)
- Greedy (1994)
- Grumpier Old Men (1995)

Executive producer

- Registered Sex Offender (2008)

Producer

- Lousy Carter (2023)

Special thanks

- Cloudy with a Chance of Meatballs (2009)

=== Television ===
Year	Title	Writer	Producer	Notes
2005–2011	American Dad!	Yes	Supervising	Also staff writer and executive story editor
2010–2015	Community	Yes	Executive	Nominated–Primetime Emmy Award for Outstanding Writing ("Remedial Chaos Theory"); Nominated–Hugo Award for Best Dramatic Presentation – Short Form; Nominated–Online Film & Television Association Television Award for Best Writing
2012–2014	The Mindy Project	Yes	Co-executive	Nominated–Writers Guild of America Award for Television: New Series
