= Luke Youngblood =

British actor (born 1986)

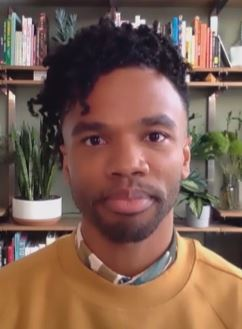
- Youngblood in 2021
- Born: 12 June 1986 (age 40); London, England
- Occupation: Actor
- Years active: 1997–present

Luke Youngblood (born 12 June 1986) is an English actor from London. He is known for playing Ben in The Story of Tracy Beaker, young Simba in The Lion King at several London venues, Lee Jordan in the Harry Potter film series, and Magnitude on the NBC comedy series Community. From 2015 to 2016, he played Sid in the ABC musical comedy series Galavant. Most recently, he played Everett Clopton in the 2023 video game Hogwarts Legacy.

== Filmography ==
=== Film ===
Year	Title	Role	Notes
1997	The IMAX Nutcracker	Magician's Assistant	Short film
2001	Harry Potter and the Philosopher's Stone	Lee Jordan	
2002	Harry Potter and the Chamber of Secrets	Lee Jordan	
2019	Useless Humans	Alex	
2021	The Witcher: Nightmare of the Wolf	Sugo	Voice role

=== Television ===
Year	Title	Role	Notes
2000	Time Gentlemen Please	Jack Raymond	Episode: "Day of the Trivheads"
2002–03	The Story of Tracy Beaker	Ben Batambuze	Main cast
2007	Project Catwalk	Himself	Contestant (season 2)
2010	The Whole Truth		Episode: "Liars"
2010	Glee	Student	Episode: "A Very Glee Christmas"
2010	Scooby-Doo! Curse of the Lake Monster	Scooby Suit Performer	TV movie
2011	Lie to Me	Kid	Episode: "Saved"
2011–15	Community	Magnitude	Recurring role
2015–16	Galavant	Sid	Main cast
2017	Superior Donuts	Malcolm	Episode: "The Amazing Racists"
2017	Dr. Ken	Himself	Episode: "Ken's Big Audition"
2017	Queen of the South	Devon's Driver	Episode: "Sacar Con Sifón el Mar"
2017	White Famous	AJ	Episode: "Life on Mars"
2018	Playing Dead	Oliver Barnes	TV movie
2019–21	Fast & Furious Spy Racers	Frostee Benson (voice)	Main cast
2020	The Loud House	Theo, Tween #2, Tween #4 (voice)	Episode: "Singled Out"
2020	Glitch Techs	Mitch Williams (voice)	Main cast
2020	Baby Shark's Big Show!	William (voice)	Main cast (English dub)
2021	Do, Re & Mi	Do (voice)	Main cast
2021	Harry Potter: Hogwarts Tournament of Houses	Himself	Scorekeeper
2022	It's Pony	Theo (voice)	Episode: "Bowled Over"
2022	Bubble Guppies	William (voice)	Episode: "The Jaw-some Sharkventure!"

=== Video games ===
Year	Title	Role	Notes
2007	Harry Potter and the Order of the Phoenix	Lee Jordan	Voice
2022	Grounded	Maxwell Smalls	Voice
2023	Hogwarts Legacy	Everett Clopton	Voice
2024	Harry Potter: Quidditch Champions	Lee Jordan	Voice
2025	Grounded 2	Maxwell Smalls	Voice
