= List of Community episodes =

The Logo of the series

Community is an American television sitcom which premiered on NBC on September 17, 2009, and ended on June 2, 2015. The series creator Dan Harmon served as showrunner for all seasons, except season four in which David Guarascio and Moses Port served as co-showrunners. The series follows a group of students at a community college in the fictional locale of Greendale, Colorado. The series heavily uses meta-humor and pop culture references, often parodying film and television clichés and tropes.

The series stars Joel McHale, Gillian Jacobs, Danny Pudi, Yvette Nicole Brown, Alison Brie, Donald Glover, Ken Jeong, and Chevy Chase, with Jim Rash being promoted from recurring to series regular in season three. In season four, following an incident on set, Chase departed the series. In the fifth episode of season five, Glover left the series, followed by Brown in the season finale.

During the course of the series, 110 episodes of Community aired over six seasons. The first season of Community aired from September 17, 2009, through May 20, 2010. On March 5, 2010, NBC renewed the series for a second season, which aired from September 23, 2010, through May 12, 2011. The series was renewed for a third season on March 17, 2011. The third season aired from September 22, 2011, and concluded on May 17, 2012. The series was renewed for a fourth season on May 10, 2012. The fourth season ran from February 7 to May 9, 2013. The day after the season four finale, NBC announced it had renewed the series for a fifth season; the season ran from January 2 through April 17, 2014. A month later NBC announced that the series had been canceled. Yahoo Screen picked it up for a sixth and final season, which ran from March 17 to June 2, 2015.

== Series overview ==
Community seasons
Season	Episodes	Originally released		
Season	Episodes	First released	Last released	Network
1	25	September 17, 2009	May 20, 2010	NBC
2	24	September 23, 2010	May 12, 2011	NBC
3	22	September 22, 2011	May 17, 2012	NBC
4	13	February 7, 2013	May 9, 2013	NBC
5	13	January 2, 2014	April 17, 2014	NBC
6	13	March 17, 2015	June 2, 2015	Yahoo! Screen

== Episodes ==
=== Season 1 (2009–10) ===
The first season of Community premiered on September 17, 2009, and ended on May 20, 2010. NBC initially ordered 13 episodes, later ordering an additional nine in October and another three in January for a total of 25.

Season one episodes
No. overall	No. in season	Title	Directed by	Written by	Original release date	Prod. code	U.S. viewers (millions)
1	1	"Pilot"	Anthony Russo & Joe Russo	Dan Harmon	September 17, 2009	100	7.89
2	2	"Spanish 101"	Joe Russo	Dan Harmon	September 24, 2009	101	5.39
3	3	"Introduction to Film"	Anthony Russo	Tim Hobert & Jon Pollack	October 1, 2009	102	5.86
4	4	"Social Psychology"	Anthony Russo	Liz Cackowski	October 8, 2009	104	4.87
5	5	"Advanced Criminal Law"	Joe Russo	Andrew Guest	October 15, 2009	105	5.01
6	6	"Football, Feminism and You"	Joe Russo	Hilary Winston	October 22, 2009	103	5.04
7	7	"Introduction to Statistics"	Justin Lin	Tim Hobert & Jon Pollack	October 29, 2009	106	5.32
8	8	"Home Economics"	Anthony Russo	Lauren Pomerantz	November 5, 2009	107	5.45
9	9	"Debate 109"	Joe Russo	Tim Hobert	November 12, 2009	109	5.09
10	10	"Environmental Science"	Seth Gordon	Zach Paez	November 19, 2009	108	4.86
11	11	"The Politics of Human Sexuality"	Anthony Russo	Hilary Winston	December 3, 2009	110	5.42
12	12	"Comparative Religion"	Adam Davidson	Liz Cackowski	December 10, 2009	111	5.51
13	13	"Investigative Journalism"	Joe Russo	Jon Pollack & Tim Hobert	January 14, 2010	113	5.42
14	14	"Interpretive Dance"	Justin Lin	Lauren Pomerantz	January 21, 2010	112	4.75
15	15	"Romantic Expressionism"	Joe Russo	Andrew Guest	February 4, 2010	115	5.23
16	16	"Communication Studies"	Adam Davidson	Chris McKenna	February 11, 2010	116	5.15
17	17	"Physical Education"	Anthony Russo	Jessie Miller	March 4, 2010	118	5.02
18	18	"Basic Genealogy"	Ken Whittingham	Karey Dornetto	March 11, 2010	117	4.60
19	19	"Beginner Pottery"	Anthony Russo	Hilary Winston	March 18, 2010	114	5.07
20	20	"The Science of Illusion"	Adam Davidson	Zach Paez	March 25, 2010	122	5.07
21	21	"Contemporary American Poultry"	Tristram Shapeero	Emily Cutler & Karey Dornetto	April 22, 2010	123	3.67
22	22	"The Art of Discourse"	Adam Davidson	Chris McKenna	April 29, 2010	124	4.36
23	23	"Modern Warfare"	Justin Lin	Emily Cutler	May 6, 2010	119	4.35
24	24	"English as a Second Language"	Gail Mancuso	Tim Hobert	May 13, 2010	120	4.49
25	25	"Pascal's Triangle Revisited"	Joe Russo	Hilary Winston	May 20, 2010	121	4.43

=== Season 2 (2010–11) ===
The second season of Community premiered on September 23, 2010, and ended on May 12, 2011. NBC initially ordered 22 episodes, later ordering another two for a total of 24.

Season two episodes
No. overall	No. in season	Title	Directed by	Written by	Original release date	Prod. code	U.S. viewers (millions)
26	1	"Anthropology 101"	Joe Russo	Chris McKenna	September 23, 2010	201	5.00
27	2	"Accounting for Lawyers"	Joe Russo	Emily Cutler	September 30, 2010	203	4.53
28	3	"The Psychology of Letting Go"	Anthony Russo	Hilary Winston	October 7, 2010	202	4.20
29	4	"Basic Rocket Science"	Anthony Russo	Andy Bobrow	October 14, 2010	204	4.81
30	5	"Messianic Myths and Ancient Peoples"	Tristram Shapeero	Andrew Guest	October 21, 2010	205	4.46
31	6	"Epidemiology"	Anthony Hemingway	Karey Dornetto	October 28, 2010	206	5.64
32	7	"Aerodynamics of Gender"	Tristram Shapeero	Adam Countee	November 4, 2010	207	4.61
33	8	"Cooperative Calligraphy"	Joe Russo	Megan Ganz	November 11, 2010	208	4.53
34	9	"Conspiracy Theories and Interior Design"	Adam Davidson	Chris McKenna	November 18, 2010	210	4.41
35	10	"Mixology Certification"	Jay Chandrasekhar	Andy Bobrow	December 2, 2010	209	4.55
36	11	"Abed's Uncontrollable Christmas"	Duke Johnson	Dino Stamatopoulos & Dan Harmon	December 9, 2010	222	4.29
37	12	"Asian Population Studies"	Anthony Russo	Emily Cutler	January 20, 2011	211	4.73
38	13	"Celebrity Pharmacology"	Fred Goss	Hilary Winston	January 27, 2011	212	4.59
39	14	"Advanced Dungeons & Dragons"	Joe Russo	Andrew Guest	February 3, 2011	214	4.37
40	15	"Early 21st Century Romanticism"	Steven Sprung	Karey Dornetto	February 10, 2011	213	3.81
41	16	"Intermediate Documentary Filmmaking"	Joe Russo	Megan Ganz	February 17, 2011	215	4.11
42	17	"Intro to Political Science"	Jay Chandrasekhar	Adam Countee	February 24, 2011	216	3.79
43	18	"Custody Law and Eastern European Diplomacy"	Anthony Russo	Andy Bobrow	March 17, 2011	217	4.15
44	19	"Critical Film Studies"	Richard Ayoade	Sona Panos	March 24, 2011	218	4.46
45	20	"Competitive Wine Tasting"	Joe Russo	Emily Cutler	April 14, 2011	219	3.49
46	21	"Paradigms of Human Memory"	Tristram Shapeero	Chris McKenna	April 21, 2011	220	3.17
47	22	"Applied Anthropology and Culinary Arts"	Jay Chandrasekhar	Karey Dornetto	April 28, 2011	221	3.35
48	23	"A Fistful of Paintballs"	Joe Russo	Andrew Guest	May 5, 2011	223	3.49
49	24	"For a Few Paintballs More"	Joe Russo	Hilary Winston	May 12, 2011	224	3.32

=== Season 3 (2011–12) ===
The third season of Community premiered on September 22, 2011, and ended on May 17, 2012. It consists of 22 episodes. On November 14, 2011, NBC announced that they were placing Community on hiatus in favor of 30 Rock. Immediately following this there was a fan-campaign demanding that Community be returned to the schedule. The campaign utilized the phrase "six seasons and a movie", which first appeared in the episode "Paradigms of Human Memory". The phrase went on to be used in the future by both fans and the creative team when the show was faced with cancellation. On February 21, 2012, the return date of the show was stated to be March 15.

Season three episodes
No. overall	No. in season	Title	Directed by	Written by	Original release date	Prod. code	U.S. viewers (millions)
50	1	"Biology 101"	Anthony Russo	Garrett Donovan & Neil Goldman	September 22, 2011	301	3.93
51	2	"Geography of Global Conflict"	Joe Russo	Andy Bobrow	September 29, 2011	302	3.98
52	3	"Competitive Ecology"	Anthony Russo	Maggie Bandur	October 6, 2011 (Note: The episode listing is the broadcast order. Episodes 3 and 4, and 11 and 12 were switched around in their original broadcast but appear in production order on home media releases.)	304	3.35
53	4	"Remedial Chaos Theory"	Jeff Melman	Chris McKenna	October 13, 2011	303	3.78
54	5	"Horror Fiction in Seven Spooky Steps"	Tristram Shapeero	Dan Harmon	October 27, 2011	305	3.42
55	6	"Advanced Gay"	Joe Russo	Matt Murray	November 3, 2011	306	3.84
56	7	"Studies in Modern Movement"	Tristram Shapeero	Adam Countee	November 10, 2011	307	3.49
57	8	"Documentary Filmmaking: Redux"	Joe Russo	Megan Ganz	November 17, 2011	308	3.62
58	9	"Foosball and Nocturnal Vigilantism"	Anthony Russo	Chris Kula	December 1, 2011	309	3.74
59	10	"Regional Holiday Music"	Tristram Shapeero	Steve Basilone & Annie Mebane	December 8, 2011	311	3.60
60	11	"Urban Matrimony and the Sandwich Arts"	Kyle Newacheck	Vera Santamaria	March 15, 2012	312	4.75
61	12	"Contemporary Impressionists"	Kyle Newacheck	Alex Cooley	March 22, 2012	310	3.87
62	13	"Digital Exploration of Interior Design"	Dan Eckman	Chris McKenna	March 29, 2012	313	3.48
63	14	"Pillows and Blankets"	Tristram Shapeero	Andy Bobrow	April 5, 2012	314	3.00
64	15	"Origins of Vampire Mythology"	Steven Tsuchida	Dan Harmon	April 12, 2012	315	3.09
65	16	"Virtual Systems Analysis"	Tristram Shapeero	Matt Murray	April 19, 2012	316	2.77
66	17	"Basic Lupine Urology"	Rob Schrab	Megan Ganz	April 26, 2012	317	3.21
67	18	"Course Listing Unavailable"	Tristram Shapeero	Tim Saccardo	May 3, 2012	318	3.20
68	19	"Curriculum Unavailable"	Adam Davidson	Adam Countee	May 10, 2012	319	2.99
69	20	"Digital Estate Planning"	Adam Davidson	Matt Warburton	May 17, 2012	322	2.97
70	21	"The First Chang Dynasty"	Jay Chandrasekhar	Matt Fusfeld & Alex Cuthbertson	May 17, 2012	320	2.61
71	22	"Introduction to Finality"	Tristram Shapeero	Steve Basilone & Annie Mebane	May 17, 2012	321	2.48

=== Season 4 (2013) ===
The fourth season of Community premiered on February 7, 2013, and ended on May 9, 2013. It consists of 13 episodes. This was the only season of the show to not have Dan Harmon as showrunner, being replaced by Moses Port and David Guarascio. The season was initially scheduled to premiere on October 19, 2012, airing in a new time slot on Fridays at 8:30 pm ET. However, in early October 2012 NBC delayed the premiere. They later released a video of the cast of Community, in character, addressing the delay of the season premiere; this video humorously claimed that October 19 is merely a "state of mind". On October 30, NBC announced the new release date, returning it to its original time slot of Thursdays at 8:00 pm ET.

Season four episodes
No. overall	No. in season	Title	Directed by	Written by	Original release date	Prod. code	U.S. viewers (millions)
72	1	"History 101"	Tristram Shapeero	Andy Bobrow	February 7, 2013	401	3.88
73	2	"Paranormal Parentage"	Tristram Shapeero	Megan Ganz	February 14, 2013	403	2.76
74	3	"Conventions of Space and Time"	Michael Patrick Jann	Maggie Bandur	February 21, 2013	404	3.08
75	4	"Alternative History of the German Invasion"	Steven Tsuchida	Ben Wexler	February 28, 2013	402	2.83
76	5	"Cooperative Escapism in Familial Relations"	Tristram Shapeero	Steve Basilone & Annie Mebane	March 7, 2013	405	3.29
77	6	"Advanced Documentary Filmmaking"	Jay Chandrasekhar	Hunter Covington	March 14, 2013	408	2.58
78	7	"Economics of Marine Biology"	Tricia Brock	Tim Saccardo	March 21, 2013	406	2.95
79	8	"Herstory of Dance"	Tristram Shapeero	Jack Kukoda	April 4, 2013	407	2.32
80	9	"Intro to Felt Surrogacy"	Tristram Shapeero	Gene Hong	April 11, 2013	413	2.84
81	10	"Intro to Knots"	Tristram Shapeero	Andy Bobrow	April 18, 2013	409	3.13
82	11	"Basic Human Anatomy"	Beth McCarthy-Miller	Jim Rash	April 25, 2013	410	2.33
83	12	"Heroic Origins"	Victor Nelli, Jr.	Steve Basilone & Annie Mebane & Maggie Bandur	May 2, 2013	412	2.67
84	13	"Advanced Introduction to Finality"	Tristram Shapeero	Megan Ganz	May 9, 2013	411	3.08

=== Season 5 (2014) ===
The fifth season of Community premiered on January 2, 2014, and ended on April 17, 2014. It consists of 13 episodes. This was the final season of the series to air on NBC. Following NBC's cancellation there were talks for the show to be moved to Hulu; the series was ultimately picked up by Yahoo! Screen.

Season five episodes
No. overall	No. in season	Title	Directed by	Written by	Original release date	Prod. code	U.S. viewers (millions)
85	1	"Repilot"	Tristram Shapeero	Dan Harmon & Chris McKenna	January 2, 2014	501	3.49
86	2	"Introduction to Teaching"	Jay Chandrasekhar	Andy Bobrow	January 2, 2014	502	3.49
87	3	"Basic Intergluteal Numismatics"	Tristram Shapeero	Erik Sommers	January 9, 2014	505	3.58
88	4	"Cooperative Polygraphy"	Tristram Shapeero	Alex Rubens	January 16, 2014	503	3.07
89	5	"Geothermal Escapism"	Joe Russo	Tim Saccardo	January 23, 2014	504	3.02
90	6	"Analysis of Cork-Based Networking"	Tristram Shapeero	Monica Padrick	January 30, 2014	506	3.01
91	7	"Bondage and Beta Male Sexuality"	Tristram Shapeero	Dan Guterman	February 27, 2014	507	2.56
92	8	"App Development and Condiments"	Rob Schrab	Jordan Blum & Parker Deay	March 6, 2014	508	2.79
93	9	"VCR Maintenance and Educational Publishing"	Tristram Shapeero	Donald Diego	March 13, 2014	509	2.77
94	10	"Advanced Advanced Dungeons & Dragons"	Joe Russo	Matt Roller	March 20, 2014	510	3.32
95	11	"G.I. Jeff" "Government Issue Jeff"	Rob Schrab	Dino Stamatopoulos	April 3, 2014	513	2.50
96	12	"Basic Story"	Jay Chandrasekhar	Carol Kolb	April 10, 2014	512	2.56
97	13	"Basic Sandwich"	Rob Schrab	Ryan Ridley	April 17, 2014	511	2.87

=== Season 6 (2015) ===
The sixth season of Community premiered on March 17, 2015, and ended on June 2, 2015. It consists of 13 episodes. This was the only season to air on Yahoo Screen. Yahoo! considered a seventh season but due to contractual issues did not renew the series. Shortly after Yahoo! Screen was itself discontinued due to large financial losses.

Season six episodes
No. overall	No. in season	Title	Directed by	Written by	Original release date	Prod. code
98	1	"Ladders"	Rob Schrab	Dan Harmon & Chris McKenna	March 17, 2015	602
99	2	"Lawnmower Maintenance and Postnatal Care"	Jim Rash & Nat Faxon	Alex Rubens	March 17, 2015	601
100	3	"Basic Crisis Room Decorum"	Bobcat Goldthwait	Monica Padrick	March 24, 2015	605
101	4	"Queer Studies and Advanced Waxing"	Jim Rash & Nat Faxon	Matt Lawton	March 31, 2015	603
102	5	"Laws of Robotics and Party Rights"	Rob Schrab	Dean Young	April 7, 2015	604
103	6	"Basic Email Security"	Jay Chandrasekhar	Matt Roller	April 14, 2015	606
104	7	"Advanced Safety Features"	Rob Schrab	Carol Kolb	April 21, 2015	607
105	8	"Intro to Recycled Cinema"	Victor Nelli, Jr.	Clay Lapari	April 28, 2015	608
106	9	"Grifting 101"	Rob Schrab	Ryan Ridley	May 5, 2015	609
107	10	"Basic RV Repair and Palmistry"	Jay Chandrasekhar	Dan Guterman	May 12, 2015	610
108	11	"Modern Espionage"	Rob Schrab	Mark Stegemann	May 19, 2015	611
109	12	"Wedding Videography"	Adam Davidson	Briggs Hatton	May 26, 2015	612
110	13	"Emotional Consequences of Broadcast Television"	Rob Schrab	Dan Harmon & Chris McKenna	June 2, 2015	613

== Community: The Movie ==
On September 30, 2022, after long speculation, McHale announced that a feature-length film would be released by the streaming service Peacock. Alongside McHale, cast members Brie, Jacobs, Jeong, Pudi, and Rash were revealed to be returning, with Harmon set to write it. In April 2023, Glover confirmed his involvement in the film. Harmon later revealed that Brown was also set to return despite her originally saying otherwise. Chase was not contacted about reprising his role.

As of 2026, the movie was said to be "very close to shooting", with the delays being attributed to the difficulty of scheduling times when the entire cast could get together to perform as a unit.

== Webisodes ==
=== The 5 As (2009) ===
The 5 As of Greendale is a webisode series that appeared before Community's pilot was broadcast. The videos are set up as informational videos featuring dean of admissions Pat Isakson (Dan Harmon) welcoming potential students to Greendale Community College.

The 5 As episodes
No.	Title	Original release date
1	"Greendale's First Straight A: Accessibility"	August 20, 2009
2	"Greendale's Second Straight A: Affordability"	August 20, 2009
3	"More Straight A's: Air Conditioning / Awesome New Friends"	August 20, 2009
4	"Greendale's Final Straight A: A Lot of Classes"	August 20, 2009
5	"Pat Isakson Screws Up – Part 1"	August 20, 2009
6	"Pat Isakson Screws Up – Part 2"	August 20, 2009

=== The Community College Chronicles (2009) ===
The Community College Chronicles are two webisodes that act as Abed Nadir's student films. The webisodes parody events that happen on Community. In the episode "Debate 109", the webisodes were seen by the characters making them believe Abed can see the future. The webisodes also appeared as part of the A/V department's page on the Greendale Community College's website.

The Community College Chronicles episodes
No.	Title	Original release date
1	"My Hobo Days"	November 11, 2009
2	"Pop Quiz"	November 11, 2009

=== Spanish Videos (2010) ===
Spanish Videos are two webisodes featuring Star-Burns (Dino Stamatopoulos), Abed (Danny Pudi), and Señor Chang (Ken Jeong). Señor Chang assigns the class a video assignment and Abed and Star-Burns make a space epic.

Spanish Videos episodes
No.	Title	Original release date
1	"Part 1"	April 22, 2010
2	"Part 2"	April 22, 2010

=== Dean Pelton's Office Hours (2010) ===
Dean Pelton's Office Hours are three webisodes focusing on Dean Pelton (Jim Rash) solving student problems.

Dean Pelton's Office Hours episodes
No.	Title	Original release date
1	"Pamphlet Serious"	November 4, 2010
2	"Hair Piece"	November 4, 2010
3	"Independent Study Assistant"	November 4, 2010

=== Abed's Master Key (2012) ===
Abed's Master Key are three animated webisodes in which Abed becomes Dean Pelton's assistant and is given a master key to Greendale.

Abed's Master Key episodes
No.	Title	Original release date
1	"Part One"	March 7, 2012
2	"Part Two"	March 7, 2012
3	"Part Three"	March 7, 2012

== Ratings ==
Community : U.S. viewers per episode (millions)

Season	Episode number																								
Season	1	2	3	4	5	6	7	8	9	10	11	12	13	14	15	16	17	18	19	20	21	22	23	24	25
1	7.89	5.39	5.86	4.87	5.01	5.04	5.32	5.45	5.09	4.86	5.42	5.51	5.42	4.75	5.23	5.15	5.02	4.60	5.07	5.07	3.67	4.36	4.35	4.49	4.43
2	5.00	4.53	4.20	4.81	4.46	5.64	4.61	4.53	4.41	4.55	4.29	4.73	4.59	4.37	3.81	4.11	3.79	4.15	4.46	3.49	3.17	3.35	3.49	3.32	–
3	3.93	3.98	3.35	3.78	3.42	3.84	3.49	3.62	3.74	3.60	4.75	3.87	3.48	3.00	3.09	2.77	3.21	3.20	2.99	2.97	2.61	2.48	–		
4	3.88	2.76	3.08	2.83	3.29	2.58	2.95	2.32	2.84	3.13	2.33	2.67	3.08	–											
5	3.49	3.49	3.58	3.07	3.02	3.01	2.56	2.79	2.77	3.32	2.50	2.56	2.87	–											

Audience measurement performed by Nielsen Media Research

Due to its release on streaming, ratings are not available for the sixth season.
