= Community season 4 =

Season of television series

Community
- Season 4
- DVD cover
- Showrunners: David Guarascio; Moses Port
- Starring: Joel McHale; Gillian Jacobs; Danny Pudi; Yvette Nicole Brown; Alison Brie; Donald Glover; Jim Rash; Ken Jeong; Chevy Chase
- No. of episodes: 13

Release
- Original network: NBC
- Original release: February 7 – May 9, 2013

Season chronology
- ← Previous; Season 3 Next → Season 5

The fourth season of the television sitcom Community premiered on February 7, 2013, and concluded on May 9, 2013. The season consists of 13 episodes and aired on NBC on Thursdays at 8:00 pm ET as part of the network's "Comedy Night Done Right" programming block.

The season marked the departure of showrunner Dan Harmon, replaced by Moses Port and David Guarascio, and overall received mixed reviews from critics. In the series's fifth season, Harmon returned as showrunner, and the fourth season was referred to retroactively in the series' continuity as "the gas-leak year."

== Cast ==
=== Starring ===
- Joel McHale as Jeff Winger
- Gillian Jacobs as Britta Perry
- Danny Pudi as Abed Nadir
- Yvette Nicole Brown as Shirley Bennett
- Alison Brie as Annie Edison
- Donald Glover as Troy Barnes
- Jim Rash as Dean Craig Pelton
- Ken Jeong as Ben Chang / Kevin
- Chevy Chase as Pierce Hawthorne

=== Recurring ===
- Richard Erdman as Leonard Briggs
- Erik Charles Nielsen as Garrett Lambert
- Danielle Kaplowitz as Vicki Jenkins
- Charley Koontz as Neil
- Luke Youngblood as Magnitude
- Malcolm McDowell as Professor Cornwallis
- David Neher as Todd Jacobson
- Marcy McCusker as Quendra

=== Guest stars ===
- Jason Alexander as Mountain Man ("Intro to Felt Surrogacy")
- Sara Bareilles as Balloon Guide ("Intro to Felt Surrogacy")
- Jordan Black as City College Dean Spreck ("Heroic Origins")
- James Brolin as William Winger, Sr. ("Cooperative Escapism In Familial Relations")
- Adam DeVine as William Winger, Jr. ("Cooperative Escapism In Familial Relations")
- Chris Diamantopoulos as Reinhold ("Alternative History of the German Invasion")
- Joe Lo Truglio as Mark (“Advanced Introduction to Finality”)
- J. P. Manoux as Dopple-deaner (“Advanced Introduction to Finality”)
- Giancarlo Esposito as Gilbert Lawson ("Paranormal Parentage")
- Sophie B. Hawkins as herself ("Herstory of Dance")
- Tricia Helfer as Lauren ("Conventions of Space and Time")
- Brie Larson as Rachel ("Herstory of Dance")
- Natasha Leggero as Mysti ("Heroic Origins")
- Matt Lucas as Toby Weeks ("Conventions of Space and Time")
- Jerry Minor as Jerry the Janitor ("Basic Human Anatomy")
- Iqbal Theba as Gobi Nadir ("Heroic Origins")
- Fred Willard as Alter-Pierce ("History 101")
- Irene Choi as Annie Kim ("History 101")
- Luke Perry as American Inspector Spacetime ("Conventions of Space and Time") (uncredited)
- Jennie Garth as the American Inspector Spacetime's ensign/companion ("Conventions of Space and Time") (uncredited)

== Episodes ==
Season four episodes
No. overall	No. in season	Title	Directed by	Written by	Original release date	Prod. code	U.S. viewers (millions)
72	1	"History 101"	Tristram Shapeero	Andy Bobrow	February 7, 2013	401	3.88
Jeff competes to earn the group places in the over-booked "History of Ice Cream" class, while Abed struggles with the inevitable end of their time at Greendale, causing him to enter a mental "happy place" which shows bizarre alternative versions of Greendale. Annie and Shirley pull pranks around the school.
73	2	"Paranormal Parentage"	Tristram Shapeero	Megan Ganz	February 14, 2013	403	2.76
After Pierce locks himself inside the panic room of his mansion, he calls on the study group to find the code that will unlock the room and let him out. The group searches the dark, scary mansion for the code, uncovering all sorts of secrets and oddities along the way.
74	3	"Conventions of Space and Time"	Michael Patrick Jann	Maggie Bandur	February 21, 2013	404	3.08
The study group attends InSpecTiCon, a convention for fans of Inspector Spacetime. Abed meets a fellow fan named Toby (Matt Lucas), who causes a rift in Troy and Abed's friendship. Meanwhile, while Jeff is attracting a female Inspector Spacetime fan (Tricia Helfer), Annie creates an elaborate fantasy involving her and Jeff after the hotel staff begin calling her "Mrs. Winger", and Pierce and Shirley join a focus group for an American remake of Inspector Spacetime.
75	4	"Alternative History of the German Invasion"	Steven Tsuchida	Ben Wexler	February 28, 2013	402	2.83
With the study group beginning their European History class, they are dismayed to learn that they will be sharing the class with the obnoxious German students that Jeff and Shirley duelled with over the foosball table the previous year. Meanwhile, Chang returns to Greendale as "Kevin" suffering from amnesia (or "Changnesia"), which upsets Dean Pelton.
76	5	"Cooperative Escapism in Familial Relations"	Tristram Shapeero	Steve Basilone & Annie Mebane	March 7, 2013	405	3.29
During Thanksgiving, Jeff reunites with his father and meets his half brother, while Britta follows along. Shirley hosts a Thanksgiving gathering at her house with the rest of the study group, which Abed narrates in the style of The Shawshank Redemption.
77	6	"Advanced Documentary Filmmaking"	Jay Chandrasekhar	Hunter Covington	March 14, 2013	408	2.58
Abed films a documentary on Chang's "Changnesia" in order to help Greendale secure a $40,000 grant from MacGuffin Neurological Institute, while Jeff becomes insistent on finding evidence that Chang is faking.
78	7	"Economics of Marine Biology"	Tricia Brock	Tim Saccardo	March 21, 2013	406	2.95
Dean Pelton enlists Jeff, Britta, and Annie to help Greendale recruit a "whale", a lazy young man whose wealthy parents would be pouring money fruitlessly into his college education for a long profitable while. Annie and Britta are the welcoming committee on campus, while Jeff is tasked to keep Pierce occupied off-campus so that he doesn't show up and ruin the plan. Meanwhile, Troy and Shirley enroll in a new "Physical Education Education" class where they are taught how to be P.E. teachers, where Shirley is a natural and Troy a complete failure, and Abed starts a new fraternity, the Delta Cubes, in general defiance of the Dean's dislike for such groups.
79	8	"Herstory of Dance"	Tristram Shapeero	Jack Kukoda	April 4, 2013	407	2.32
To distract from Greendale's drinking fountains being removed by the CDC, Dean Pelton plans a "Sadie Hawkins" dance; Britta organizes a competing "Sophie B. Hawkins" dance in protest, confusing her with Susan B. Anthony. At the dance, Abed goes on two dates, set up by Annie and Shirley, and is assisted by the coat check girl (Brie Larson) who aids in his mischief.
80	9	"Intro to Felt Surrogacy"	Tristram Shapeero	Gene Hong	April 11, 2013	413	2.84
After a traumatic balloon ride leaves them stuck in an awkward silence, Dean Pelton helps the group come to terms with events through the new technique of "puppet therapy", causing them to recall back to the events, in the form of a musical puppet show.
81	10	"Intro to Knots"	Tristram Shapeero	Andy Bobrow	April 18, 2013	409	3.13
The study group holds a Christmas party at Jeff's apartment; Annie secretly invites Professor Cornwallis (Malcolm McDowell) in order to get on his good side so he will give them a good grade. When he drops their grade to an F, the group hold Cornwallis hostage, not letting him go until he gives them a better grade, while he attempts to have them turn on each other.
82	11	"Basic Human Anatomy"	Beth McCarthy-Miller	Jim Rash	April 25, 2013	410	2.33
Troy and Abed re-enact a scene from the original Freaky Friday that leads them each to act like they've really switched bodies. Meanwhile, Annie and Shirley are snide to each other over the valedictorian race, but they are united in disgust that Leonard is currently #1 in the class.
83	12	"Heroic Origins"	Victor Nelli, Jr.	Steve Basilone & Annie Mebane & Maggie Bandur	May 2, 2013	412	2.67
Abed pieces together the study group's past and realizes that their lives and the moments they decided to attend Greendale were all intertwined.
84	13	"Advanced Introduction to Finality"	Tristram Shapeero	Megan Ganz	May 9, 2013	411	3.08
Jeff now has enough credits to graduate and as a ceremony is about to occur for him, he contemplates his future. Meanwhile, the study group from the Darkest Timeline emerges to disrupt things.

== Production ==
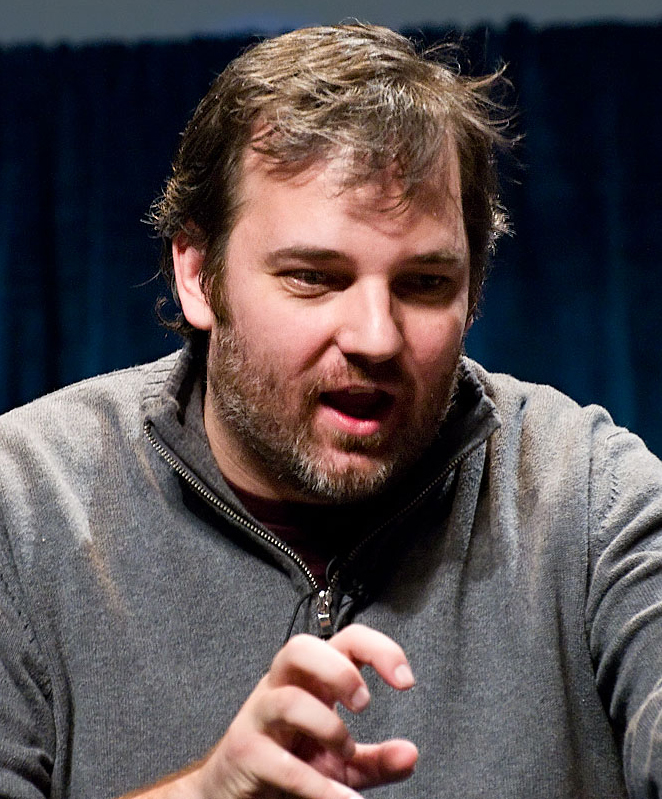
Prior to the fourth season's production, series' creator Dan Harmon was fired by Sony Pictures Television.

The series was renewed for a fourth season of 13 episodes on May 10, 2012. On May 18, 2012, after returning to California from a cross-country flight, series' creator Dan Harmon received a text message alerting him that he had been relieved of his position as Community showrunner by Sony Pictures Television. Reportedly, Harmon's erratic behavior (such as his drinking, his tardiness, his falling asleep at work and his disappearing in San Francisco for a few days during the SF Sketchfest) and leadership style (namely the "tug of war between his perfectionist tendencies and his procrastinator nature") were the reasons that the studio fired him. To replace Harmon, Sony Pictures Television hired writers David Guarascio and Moses Port, the co-creators of the short-lived CW series Aliens in America. Sony Pictures Television claimed that Harmon would serve as a consulting producer, but Harmon affirmed via his Tumblr that he would not return in a position without executive prerogatives. Regardless, Harmon was credited as an "executive consultant" for the season, despite not working on a single episode.

The fourth season saw other behind-the-scenes changes, as well. Executive producers Neil Goldman and Garrett Donovan, writer/producer Chris McKenna and actor/writer Dino Stamatopoulos all departed following the third season. Frequent episode directors and executive producers Anthony and Joe Russo also left in order to direct Captain America: The Winter Soldier. McKenna, Stamatopoulos, and Joe Russo later returned to work on the show's fifth season.

Returning writers for fourth season included co-executive producer Andy Bobrow, producer Megan Ganz, and staff writer Tim Saccardo, who had been with the series since season two; and co-executive producer Maggie Bandur, and writing team and executive story editors Steve Basilone and Annie Mebane, who joined the series in season three. New additions to the writing staff in the fourth season included co-executive producer Ben Wexler, co-producers Hunter Covington and Gene Hong, and staff writers Issac Gonzalez and Jack Kukoda. Cast member Jim Rash (who won an Academy Award for co-writing The Descendants) wrote the eleventh episode of the season. Tristram Shapeero, who directed several episodes during the first three seasons, was promoted to an executive producer and directed the majority of the fourth season's episodes.

Filming for the season began in August 2012, and the season was initially scheduled to premiere on October 19, 2012, airing in a new time slot on Fridays at 8:30 pm. In early October 2012, NBC delayed the premiere. NBC.com released a video of the cast of Community in character addressing the delay of the season premiere; this video humorously claimed that October 19 is merely a "state of mind". On October 30, 2012, NBC announced that the fourth season would premiere on February 7, 2013, returning to its original time slot of Thursdays at 8:00 pm.

=== Chevy Chase's departure ===
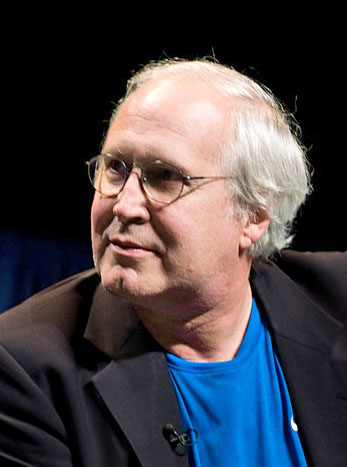
This was the final season to feature Chevy Chase as a series regular.

It was not fun at all [to write Chevy Chase out of the show]. Especially because for a couple weeks we did not know from day to day, from hour to hour, whether we had Chevy or not. We literally had to come up with multiple contingency plans: what if you had Chevy for one more day? What if you didn't have him at all? What if you had him but only under very specific conditions? It drove us fucking crazy.

— Andy Bobrow, discussing writing Chevy Chase's departure into the story.

During the filming of "Advanced Documentary Filmmaking", Chevy Chase became angry at the racist direction his character was heading. While venting his frustrations, he used the slur "nigger"; episode director Jay Chandrasekhar argued that Chase's use of the word was a "political comment," and an attempt to point out how racist his character had become. Regardless, the slur upset cast members, prompting Chase to walk off set. He later returned to film some additional scenes, but later announced on November 21, 2012, that he had left the show.

As a result of timing and the agreement made, Chase's character Pierce is absent for two episodes—he did not appear in tenth episode, "Intro to Knots", or the twelfth episode, "Heroic Origins". He did appear in a voice-only role in the episode "Intro to Felt Surrogacy", which was the final episode produced for the season, and as part of his agreement to leave the show, Chase was required to record all audio for the scenes where his character, alongside the other characters, appeared as a puppet. The season finale, which was filmed out-of-sequence, as it was the eleventh episode produced, marked the final on-screen appearance (based on production order) of Chase as a regular cast member.

== Reception ==
=== Rating ===
The season premiere, "History 101", was seen by 3.88 million viewers and scored a 1.8 in the 18–49 demographic. This meant that its ratings were up when compared not only to the third season finale (which was seen by 2.48 million viewers and received a 1.3 in the 18–49 demographic) but also the prior season's premiere (which was seen by 3.93 million and received a 1.7 in the 18–49 demographic). The premiere's ratings were enough to generate cautiously optimistic speculation that the show would be renewed for a fifth season (speculation that was later confirmed). As the season wore on the ratings began to dip which led some to wonder if this would be the show's last. The season's final episode "Advanced Introduction to Finality" was viewed by 3.08 million viewers and scored a 1.3 rating in the 18–49 demographic.

=== Critical reviews ===
The fourth season received mixed reviews from critics, and is considered to be the weakest season of Community due to Harmon's absence. The fourth season scored 69 out of 100 based on 17 critics on Metacritic based on episode 1 and 3, indicating "generally favorable" reviews. On Rotten Tomatoes, the season has an approval rating of 65% with an average score of 6.5 out of 10 based on 40 reviews. The website's critical consensus reads, "Despite some behind-the-scenes drama, the fourth season of Community manages to retain the playful energy, potent humor, and kooky stories the show is famous for."

Verne Gay of Newsday stated, "Still defiantly Community, still good and still uninterested in adding new viewers." On the other hand, Hitfix's Alan Sepinwall stated, "It feels like [Moses] Port, [David] Guarascio and the other writers decided to reverse-engineer the [Dan] Harmon version of Community, but couldn't quite manage without the missing ingredient of Harmon himself." Mike Hale of The New York Times has stated that the series "has been dumbed down, its humor broadened past recognition, and the two episodes provided for review...have fewer laughs between them than a single good scene from the old Community." At the end of season 4, The A.V. Club's Emily VanDerWerff confessed, "I never thought I would say this, but I just don't care anymore."

=== Harmon's response ===
In an episode of Harmontown — a weekly live-comedy podcast — Harmon initially said that, while the season was an "impression, and an unflattering one," it was merely "not [his] cup of tea." Later in the same interview, however, he likened it to "'flipping through Instagram just watching your girlfriend blow everyone' and seeing a friend 'Like' a photo of your ex-girlfriend with her new boyfriend on Facebook." Harmon also described the season as like "being held down and watching your family get raped on a beach". Later, in a Tumblr blog post, Harmon apologized to fans of the show, its cast and crew and the writers. He apologized for the rape comparison and for using the phrase "durpy durpy dur" in a joke about the season, saying that the phrase is "language used to dehumanize the developmentally disabled". Sony later expressed an interest in having Harmon record commentary tracks for all the fourth-season episodes, although this did not come to pass.

== DVD release ==
The fourth season was released on DVD in region 1 on August 6, 2013, in region 2 on October 28, 2013, and in region 4 on July 3, 2014.
