= Conventions of Space and Time =

- Community episode
- Episode no.: Season 4 Episode 3
- Directed by: Michael Patrick Jann
- Written by: Maggie Bandur
- Production code: 404
- Original air date: February 21, 2013

Guest appearances
- Matt Lucas as Toby Weeks; Tricia Helfer as Lauren; Chris Tallman as bellman; Luke Perry as American Inspector Spacetime (uncredited); Jennie Garth as Ensign (uncredited)

Episode chronology
← Previous "Paranormal Parentage"	Next → "Alternative History of the German Invasion"
- Community season 4

"Conventions of Space and Time" is the 3rd episode of the fourth season of the American comedy television series Community and the 74th episode overall. It was written by Maggie Bandur and directed by Michael Patrick Jann. It originally aired in the United States on NBC on February 21, 2013.

In the episode, the study group attends a fan convention for the fictional show Inspector Spacetime. At the convention, Abed meets another fan, leaving Troy and Britta behind. Meanwhile, Annie and Jeff allow themselves to get caught up in different personas, while Pierce and Shirley are selected to provide input for an American version of the show. The episode was seen by 3.08 million viewers and received mixed to negative reviews.

== Plot ==
Abed (Danny Pudi) and Troy (Donald Glover) attend InSpecTiCon, an Inspector Spacetime convention. Britta (Gillian Jacobs) joins them, though Abed seems to disapprove of her attendance and her relationship with Troy. Jeff (Joel McHale) and Annie (Alison Brie) join the trip to go skiing. However, when the ski slopes close unexpectedly, Jeff wants to leave. Annie resists and returns to her hotel room, which was reserved under Jeff's name. Abed meets Toby (Matt Lucas), a fan he met online, and the two attend a panel without Troy and Britta. Pierce (Chevy Chase) and Shirley (Yvette Nicole Brown), who were not invited by the group, arrive at the convention and are selected for a focus group for an American adaptation of Inspector Spacetime.

When Annie orders room service, the staff address her as "Mrs. Winger". She decides to pretend to be Jeff's wife. In the lobby, an Inspector Spacetime fan, Lauren (Tricia Helfer), mistakes Jeff for an actor from the show; Jeff plays along and flirts with her. Britta realizes Toby is trying to steal Abed away from Troy. After viewing the American adaptation, Pierce criticizes it for being too complicated, while Shirley defends it.

Troy joins Abed and Toby but quickly becomes upset and leaves. Toby, noting that his own friend acted weird after getting married, invites Abed to a convention in London. Meanwhile, a hotel bellman (Chris Tallman) tells Annie about Jeff's flirting in the lobby, assuming that Jeff is cheating on her. To maintain the charade, Annie confronts Jeff, causing Lauren to leave. Angry and confused, Jeff also leaves.

Abed realizes Toby lied about his friend. Toby argues "neurotypicals" hold back people like himself and Abed, but Abed reasons that Troy keeps him emotionally grounded. In response, Toby locks Abed in a prop telephone booth. Troy tries to take a photo with Britta, but he realizes he cannot go through with it; Britta understands and tells him to find Abed. Troy locates Toby and frees Abed. Toby leaves, and Abed and Troy reconcile. Later, Jeff returns to the lobby, where Annie confesses to her play-acting and explains she was upset Jeff tried to leave. The two apologize for their respective actions. The seven group members find each other and decide to stay.

In the end tag, the group watches the American Inspector Spacetime. Afterwards, Abed tells Pierce he hates him.

== Production ==
"Conventions of Space and Time" was written by Maggie Bandur, her second writing credit for the series, and was directed by Michael Patrick Jann, his only directing credit for the series.

The Inspector Spacetime show seen in the episode is a parody of Doctor Who that first appeared in season 3's "Biology 101".

The episode features guest appearances by Matt Lucas and Tricia Helfer. Matt Lucas would later go on to star in Doctor Who as Nardole. It also features Luke Perry and Jennie Garth, who starred together on Beverly Hills, 90210, as the stars of the American version of Inspector Spacetime.

== Reception ==
=== Ratings ===
In its original broadcast, "Conventions of Space and Time" was seen by 3.08 million American viewers, placing fourth in its time slot behind The Big Bang Theory, American Idol, and Zero Hour, and achieved a 1.1 rating among adults 18-49.

=== Reviews ===
Eric Goldman of IGN gave the episode a 6 out of 10, denoting an "okay" episode, and summarized it as "an unfortunate dud". He noted that it lacked energy and humor and that the show focused more heavily on "couple stories" than it had during Dan Harmon's three seasons, though he appreciated several moments in the episode, such as Shirley standing up to network executives (which he attributed to "perhaps a bit of writers room rebellion"). Josh Gondelman of Vulture gave it 2 out of 5 stars, praising the episode's premise but criticizing it for failing to fulfill its potential. He was particularly critical of its depiction of women, especially in regard to Britta, and of the relationship between Jeff and Annie; he also noted that the episode forced him to consider if Harmon would have handled the premise better.

Erik Adams of The A.V. Club gave the episode a C− grade, remarking that it "may be the least smart Community's ever been." He praised its focus on the relationship between Troy and Abed but critiqued the characterizations of Annie and Britta, though he hesitated to declare that the show had lost its magic given its history of weak starts to seasons. Cory Barker of TV.com remarked in his review that the inclusion of four separate plots made the episode feel scattered and underdeveloped. He criticized Annie's actions as "a regressive moment" for her character and opined that Pierce and Shirley's role felt pointless, but he enjoyed the emotional moments between Troy and Abed and found Britta and Troy's relationship more convincing than it had been in the past. Barker would later rank it as Community's second-worst episode (ahead of only "Advanced Introduction to Finality"), calling it "everything you loved about Community, only broken apart into a million pieces, and reconstructed without a soul".
