= Alternative History of the German Invasion =

- Community episode
- Episode no.: Season 4 Episode 4
- Directed by: Steven Tsuchida
- Written by: Ben Wexler
- Production code: 402
- Original air date: February 28, 2013

Guest appearances
- Alex Schemmer as Karl; Alex Klein as Lukas; Chris Diamantopoulos as Reinhold; Jeremy Scott Johnson as Carl; Brady Novak as Richie; Malcolm McDowell as Professor Cornwallis

Episode chronology
← Previous "Conventions of Space and Time"	Next → "Cooperative Escapism in Familial Relations"
- Community season 4

"Alternative History of the German Invasion" is the 4th episode of the fourth season and 75th overall episode of Community, which originally aired on February 28, 2013 on NBC. The episode was Ben Wexler's first writing credit for the series and it was directed by Steven Tsuchida. It features the study group engaged in conflict with a group of German students who begin to use their study table, as the members all attend a history course. Meanwhile, Chang (Ken Jeong) returns as Kevin, claiming to have memory loss which he describes as "Changnesia".

The episode was the second of the season to be produced, but rescheduled to air fourth. It received largely negative critical reception, with criticisms made of the humor and story and some critics disliking the way the main cast were portrayed as villains in flashbacks to previous episodes. On its premiere, the episode was watched by an estimated 2.83 million viewers.

== Plot ==
In their first history lesson, the group are annoyed to learn that the course is being taken by some of the German students who Jeff (Joel McHale) and Shirley (Yvette Nicole Brown) were antagonistic with (Note: As seen in "Foosball and Nocturnal Vigilantism".)—Karl (Alex Schemmer), Lukas (Alex Klein) and the new member Reinhold (Chris Diamantopoulos). Their teacher, Professor Cornwallis (Malcolm McDowell), sets the assignment of writing about how a conflict from history would look if told from the loser's perspective.

The study group find the Germans occupying their study room, and Jeff tries to make them leave. Abed (Danny Pudi) recognizes Karl as a user who saved his life in a video game. Over the coming days, the German group reserves the study table earlier and earlier each morning, beating the group to it and forcing them to study in a variety of rooms with bad smells, faulty lighting, and chairs that break.

The study group throw the Germans an Oktoberfest party, seemingly to offer reconciliation. The group send photos of the Germans appearing at the party to the dean (Jim Rash), who informs them that students celebrating their cultural heritage on campus is forbidden, so as a result they will be banned from the study rooms. As the group return to their preferred study room, they are met with protests by other students who see them as bullies. Flashbacks to past episodes show the group's actions interfering with other students' learning.

Professor Cornwallis informs the group that they have missed a test and will be receiving F's. Now ashamed by their actions, the group works to improve facilities in the other study rooms before returning to their own study room.

Meanwhile, a man from Greendale's mental health services introduces Chang (Ken Jeong) under the name "Kevin" to the dean. Chang claims to have "Changnesia", a form of memory loss. He is to be rehabilitated at the community college. The dean goes to Carl (Jeremy Scott Johnson) and Richie (Brady Novak) of the school board to protest, but they will not reject the money the school will be paid if Chang is enrolled. After Chang turns himself into the police for his crimes the previous year, the dean arrives in jail to bail him out, believing that the original Chang would never have done that. The dean introduces the group to Chang, and they begin screaming.

In the end tag, Troy (Donald Glover) and Abed have Karl appear on their fictional "Troy and Abed Podcast", but refuse to appear on Karl's real podcast.

== Analysis ==
The episode is Ben Wexler's first writing credit for the series. Though the fourth to air, the episode was the second of the fourth season to be produced. It shows the characters on the first day of classes, whereas previous episodes show them already with an established class schedule. Its rescheduling could have been because NBC viewed it as a lower quality episode, or so that the Halloween episode "Paranormal Parentage" could air on Valentine's Day. It is the first episode of the season by airdate to show the group's study room and to have a storyline focused on the characters studying for a particular class. Flashbacks showing the group in the study room on previous occasions reference season 2's "Cooperative Calligraphy" and "Advanced Dungeons & Dragons".

== Reception ==
Upon its first broadcast in the United States, an estimated 2.83 million viewers watched the episode.

The episode received mostly negative critical reception. Some critics viewed the episode as part of a trend of season 4 being lower quality than previous seasons. However, Josh Gondelman of Vulture found it to be the first good episode of the season and rated it four out of five stars. Gabrielle Moss of TV Fanatic rated the episode 4.1 out of 5, saying that it contained "many good German jokes, but no great German joke" and praising the Changnesia storyline as a "smart move to re-set a character who had reached the limits". Eric Goldman of IGN gave it 6.5 out of 10, calling it "lackluster". Goldman said that "there were several notable dead spots" for each funny moment, and found that McDowell was "underused". Sean Gandert of Paste rated it 5.7 out of 10, criticizing both the storyline and jokes as unfunny. Gandert disliked the flashbacks which cast a negative light on the characters' former actions and disapproved that Chang "completely dominates things with his aggressive wackiness".

Emily VanDerWerff of The A.V. Club gave the episode a C rating, finding it unfunny. VanDerWerff wrote that the episode "undercuts some of the very strongest principles this show stood for" by the way it portrays the main characters. Tim Surette of TV.com believed that the episode "showed signs of improvement", but thought that the Dean and Chang storyline "floated away with zero weight" and found that Jeff's character was poorly used. In contrast, Gondelman reviewed that the episode had "bayonet-sharp writing" with a large number of quick-paced jokes, and an "immersive plot". He praised that it "maintained the show's weirdness without alienating the outsiders".
