= Intro to Felt Surrogacy =

- Community episode
- Episode no.: Season 4 Episode 9
- Directed by: Tristram Shapeero
- Written by: Gene Hong
- Production code: 413
- Original air date: April 11, 2013

Guest appearances
- Jason Alexander as Mountain Man; Erik Charles Nielsen as Garrett; Sara Bareilles as Balloon Guide

Episode chronology
← Previous "Herstory of Dance"	Next → "Intro to Knots"
- Community season 4

"Intro to Felt Surrogacy" is the 9th episode of the fourth season and 80th overall episode of the NBC sitcom Community, which originally aired on April 11, 2013. The episode was written by Gene Hong, and directed by Tristram Shapeero. The episode features the study group as puppets and several original musical numbers. Jason Alexander guest-stars as a mountain man. Sara Bareilles also guest-stars as a hot air balloon ride operator.

== Plot ==
The study group sit in awkward silence in the study room. Dean Pelton (Jim Rash), having dressed up as Pinocchio, helps the group communicate with each other through the use of puppets.

The flashback shows that the group, bothered that they may be in a rut, decides to go on a hot air balloon ride. As they sing their way into the balloon, Pierce (Chevy Chase) does drugs, causing him to sever a rope and unmoor the basket, setting it off on an untethered course without its operator (Sara Bareilles). Battling through storm and high winds, they eventually crash, although Jeff (Joel McHale) helps to soften the landing by increasing the flame, and land the balloon in the middle of the woods. There, they meet a mountain man (Jason Alexander) who feeds them berries, which cause a hallucinogenic reaction. As they sit by a fire, the group reveal personal secrets.

Back in the study room, Shirley (Yvette Nicole Brown) recounts the time she thought she saw her husband Andre with another woman at a supermarket and followed him for hours, only to find out it was not him. Meanwhile, she had left her children overnight back at the store. When the other members of the group tell her that it's the first time they've heard of this story, they realize the berries also caused them to forget most of the details of the night and have all been embarrassed by their own secrets.

The group relaxes in the knowledge that their secrets are still secret, but Shirley alone feels ashamed at being a bad mother for leaving her kids. Jeff asks the group to share their secrets again to be fair to Shirley. Jeff dated a woman who was perfect for him, but left without notice after promising to attend her son's baseball game, reflecting the actions of his own father. Britta (Gillian Jacobs) touts herself as a political activist but has actually never voted except for The Voice. Annie (Alison Brie) let Professor Cornwallis rub her feet in exchange for answers to a history test she was struggling with. Troy (Donald Glover) burnt an anthill and caused the Greendale Fire of 2003, affecting 55 acres. Pierce confesses to never actually having had sex with Eartha Kitt, only dry humping inside her tour bus. Abed (Danny Pudi) states that he did not share anything that night; when he saw how everyone was acting weird around each other, he decided to mimic them to fit in.

The group leave, now happier, as Dean Pelton laments being left behind after cleaning up the mess. He is then shocked to see Jeff's puppet lifting weights on the couch.

== Production ==
The episode was written by co-producer Gene Hong, his first writing credit for the series. It was directed by executive producer Tristram Shapeero, who directs the majority of the season 4 episodes.

This was the last episode filmed of season four with Chevy Chase, who does not appear onscreen, only providing the voice of Pierce's puppet; however, he appears in the episode Advanced Introduction to Finality, which was produced prior to this episode but aired following it. The episode features an original song co-written by Adam Levine.

The premiere airing did not use the original end tag (since they were shown the previous week as a teaser); instead, a collection of outtakes and behind-the-scenes footage set to music was used. Most of the footage can be found in several extras on the DVD, but not in the same format or in its entirety.

== Reception ==
The episode was seen by approximately 2.84 million viewers when it premiered, and increased 22% in viewership from the previous episode.
