= Studies in Modern Movement =

- Community episode
- Episode no.: Season 3 Episode 7
- Directed by: Tristram Shapeero
- Written by: Adam Countee
- Production code: 307
- Original air date: November 10, 2011

Guest appearances
- Brendan Hunt as Hitchhiker; Debra Azar as Store Clerk

Episode chronology
← Previous "Advanced Gay"	Next → "Documentary Filmmaking: Redux"
- Community season 3

"Studies in Modern Movement" is the seventh episode of the third season and 56th overall episode of the American sitcom Community. It was originally broadcast on November 10, 2011, on NBC.

In the episode, the study group helps Annie move in with Troy and Abed. Annie is worried about living with Troy and Abed's "manchildren" antics. Meanwhile, Britta and Shirley lock horns over religion and morality, while Jeff is forced to spend the day with Dean Pelton.

The episode was written by Adam Countee and directed by Tristram Shapeero.

== Plot ==
Annie (Alison Brie) is moving into Troy (Donald Glover) and Abed's (Danny Pudi) apartment. The rest of the study group are helping her move, except Jeff (Joel McHale), who is shopping but concocts an elaborate plan to convince Britta (Gillian Jacobs) he is ill. While packing at Annie's old apartment, Britta warns Annie that being roommates with Troy and Abed will not be easy, because the reasons she adores them will become the reasons she will despise them. Troy and Abed wear special T-shirts with a Twitter hashtag—#AnniesMove—for the occasion, and are live-tweeting the event.

Troy and Abed's childish antics, such as using all of Annie's packing tape to tape Troy to the bathroom door, start to annoy Annie, but she tries to play along. Troy damages one of the apartment's electrical outlets, but Pierce (Chevy Chase) offers to fix it before her landlord comes. Shirley (Yvette Nicole Brown) is concerned that Annie's "cohabitation" with Troy and Abed will lead to her moral decay, and Britta slams her religious uptightness.

While shopping, Jeff runs into Dean Craig Pelton (Jim Rash). "Craig" knows that Jeff is avoiding helping Annie move from Troy and Abed's tweets and blackmails Jeff into spending the day with him. Jeff reluctantly has lunch with him at a Mexican restaurant and joins him in a green screen karaoke session singing "Kiss from a Rose" in matching outfits. Jeff starts to enjoy himself, but the dean lets it slip that their accidental run-in and day together happened only because he read Jeff's Greendale e-mails. Jeff becomes violently outraged at this invasion of his privacy.

Britta and Shirley ride in the same car on the way to Troy and Abed's place and once again argue over religion and morality. Britta picks up a hitchhiker (Brendan Hunt) to prove that she is moral without being religious. The hitchhiker immediately begins talking about Jesus, to Shirley's delight and Britta's dismay. He and Shirley have a friendly chat until he claims to be Jesus himself. This upsets Shirley but delights Britta, who annoys Shirley by getting "Jesus" to endorse marijuana legalization. Eventually, the hitchhiker starts to sing about drinking human blood and the evils of race mixing, leading Shirley and Britta to throw him out of the car and reconcile with each other.

Meanwhile, attempting to fix the electrical outlet, Pierce damages the circuit and the wiring burns a line down the wall. Attempting to cover it with new paint, he makes a mess and gets dangerously high on paint fumes, hallucinating that he is playing piano while accompanied by hula dancers. He is rescued by the landlord.

Troy and Abed show Annie her new room—a blanket fort. Annie is uncomfortable with it, having been told the apartment has two bedrooms, but attempts to reconcile herself to it after enjoying a shadow puppet show Troy and Abed put on for her. But when she discovers that the apartment has a real second bedroom, which Troy and Abed have set aside as a "Dreamatorium" for imaginary experiences, she finally expresses her unhappiness at their childishness and decides not to move in with them.

Annie recovers Pierce, then returns to claim her stuff. Troy and Abed eventually compromise by giving their bedroom to Annie while moving into the blanket fort. Jeff arrives at the apartment and admits that he faked illness to get out of helping. The group forgives him, before revealing that they saw his rendition of "Kiss from a Rose," which was tweeted by Dean Pelton.

== Production ==
"Studies in Modern Movement" was written by Adam Countee, his third writing credit of the series. It was directed by Tristram Shapeero, his sixth directing credit.

== Cultural references ==
The "Dreamatorium" in Troy and Abed's apartment closely resembles a Star Trek holodeck.

When he "runs into" Jeff at the mall, Dean Pelton says, "This is just like that Lake House movie... I can only assume, even I have limits."

Troy and Abed's use of bubble wrap closely mirrors a scene with Chandler and Joey from the TV show Friends. Shirley also mentions the show, stating "I've seen enough episodes of Friends to know that cohabitation leads to sex, drugs, and something Parade magazine called 'Schwimmer fatigue.' "

== Reception ==
=== Ratings ===
In its original American broadcast on November 10, 2011, "Studies in Modern Movement" was viewed by an estimated 3.49 million people, with a Nielsen rating/share of 1.5/4 in the 18–49 demographic.

=== Reviews ===
The episode received mixed reviews from critics.

Ethan Alter called "Modern Movement" one of Season 3's better episodes. Leigh Raines of TV Fanatic gave it a 4.5/5 rating, saying: "It's not every week that a show has me laughing out loud, but 'Studies in Modern Movement' accomplished just that." Kelsea Stahler of Hollywood.com said, "This episode wasn’t mind-blowing. It wasn’t out there. But it was rich with character. It felt like hanging out with your hilarious, messed up friends – but those that could really only exist on television – for a half-hour. And sometimes, that’s all you need."

Alan Sepinwall of HitFix said, "I like seeing the relationships evolve in the way that they have, and I enjoyed the episode overall, but it ultimately felt a little lightweight." The A.V. Club's Emily VanDerWerff gave the episode a 'B', saying, "There are a lot of good ideas in 'Modern Movement,' but I don’t know that they ever really coalesce into anything more than a collection of stories..."
