= Intro to Knots =

- Community episode
- Episode no.: Season 4 Episode 10
- Directed by: Tristram Shapeero
- Written by: Andy Bobrow
- Production code: 409
- Original air date: April 18, 2013

Guest appearance
- Malcolm McDowell as Professor Cornwallis

Episode chronology
← Previous "Intro to Felt Surrogacy"	Next → "Basic Human Anatomy"
- Community season 4

"Intro to Knots" is the 10th episode of the fourth season and 81st overall episode of the NBC sitcom Community, which originally aired on April 18, 2013.

The episode was written by Andy Bobrow and directed by Tristram Shapeero.

The episode features the study group gathering around for Christmas at Jeff's apartment as they try to convince their history professor to change their grade. Malcolm McDowell guest-stars as Professor Cornwallis.

== Plot summary ==
Jeff (Joel McHale) hosts a Christmas party for the study group at his apartment. After learning they failed their last history paper, Annie (Alison Brie) has secretly invited their professor, Noel Cornwallis (Malcolm McDowell) in hopes of convincing him to raise their grade. Jeff confesses to Britta (Gillian Jacobs) that he blew off his section to see a Tom Waits concert but is still confused as to how they failed the group project. Cornwallis quickly realizes the group is sucking up and reasons they are seeking to boost the C− from their paper. Jeff confronts Annie about why she said they "failed" with a C−; Annie explains the grade is not good enough for her because she is trying to become valedictorian. After overhearing Jeff's rants, Cornwallis changes the grade to an F.

While the group privately discusses what happened, Chang (Ken Jeong) ties Cornwallis to a chair in a misguided attempt to help them. The group decides to use the situation to negotiate with Cornwallis for a higher grade. Cornwallis employs mind games to get the group to turn on each other and release him. He offers an A to whoever unties him, with the rest getting an F, and seeks to use the group's romantic entanglements to his advantage. Cornwallis also reveals that the student on track for valedictorian is Shirley (Yvette Nicole Brown). Despite the temptation of undermining Shirley's grades by taking the A, Annie refuses to untie Cornwallis.

Their conversation is interrupted by Dean Pelton's (Jim Rash) arrival at the door. After the dean leaves in a huff at not being invited to the party, the group realizes Cornwallis has been untied. Cornwallis taunts the group that they have a Benedict Arnold in their midst who freed him, but Jeff gives a speech explaining that the group will not turn on each other because they are all constantly making mistakes and forgiving each other. When Cornwallis continues his manipulation, the group ties him up again and settle in to open gifts. They realize after viewing Chang’s poorly wrapped gifts, he did not actually tie up Cornwallis in the first place. Cornwallis relents and admits he staged being restrained because the party provided a respite from his loneliness. The dean returns having forgiven the group and begins handing out kittens as gifts. Holding a kitten, Abed wonders how things might have differed in the Darkest Timeline, to Jeff’s exasperation.

The end tag shows the Darkest Timeline. There, Jeff convinces a judge to free Annie from Greendale Asylum. The pair kiss and then plot to invade the prime timeline.

== Production ==
The episode is set in December at a Christmas party, but aired in April due to NBC delaying the premiere of the fourth season. This episode was written by co-executive producer Andy Bobrow who wanted to shoot the episode in a style similar to Alfred Hitchcock's Rope. It was directed by executive producer Tristram Shapeero, one of the seven season 4 episodes he directed. This is the first episode aired of season four to not feature Chevy Chase (Pierce) in either onscreen or voice parts. Although aired as episode ten, it was the ninth episode produced.

== Reception ==
=== Ratings ===
The episode was seen by approximately 3.13 million viewers when it premiered, and increased 10% in viewership from the previous episode, and became the most-watched episode of the season since episode five.

=== Critical reception ===
Cory Barker of TV.com gave the episode a mixed review, saying "It offered some initial intrigue that it wasn't totally able to follow through with, then overcame that initial wave of disappointment with a strong middle, only to end on a lamer note. It wasn't a complete mess by any means, but it squandered more potential than I would have liked."

Emily VanDerWerff of The A.V. Club rated it a B−, but said, "This episode [...] tries to cram everything it can think of into the same show, when more simplicity would have led to a stronger episode overall."
