= Cooperative Escapism in Familial Relations =

- Community episode
- Episode no.: Season 4 Episode 5
- Directed by: Tristram Shapeero
- Written by: Steve Basilone and Annie Mebane
- Production code: 405
- Original air date: March 7, 2013

Guest appearances
- James Brolin as William Winger; Adam Devine as Willy Jr.

Episode chronology
← Previous "Alternative History of the German Invasion"	Next → "Advanced Documentary Filmmaking"
- Community season 4

"Cooperative Escapism in Familial Relations" is the 5th episode of the fourth season and 76th overall episode of Community, which originally aired on March 7, 2013 on NBC. Set at Thanksgiving, the episode shows Jeff meeting his father for the first time while other members of the group attend Shirley's Thanksgiving dinner with her family, in a parody of The Shawshank Redemption. The former storyline received mixed critical reception, whilst the latter was mostly criticized. The episode was watched by an estimated 3.29 million viewers upon its premiere.

== Plot ==
Shirley (Yvette Nicole Brown) invites the study group to her in-laws' Thanksgiving dinner, but the dean (Jim Rash)—having read Jeff's (Joel McHale) emails—reveals that Jeff will be meeting his father for the first time on Thanksgiving. When Jeff arrives at his father's house, he changes his mind, but he calls Britta (Gillian Jacobs) and learns that she is waiting for him at the house. He is forced to go there and meet his father William (James Brolin) and half-brother Willy Jr. (Adam Devine), the latter of whom is worried that Jeff will replace him. As Britta attempts to console Willy Jr., Jeff and William begin to get along and realize their similarities.

After William suggests that his abandonment of Jeff had a positive influence on his life, Jeff leaves in anger. As he is driving, he is shocked to find Willy Jr. in his backseat, begging for advice on how to get his father to stop hating him. In answering, Jeff realizes that he cannot achieve closure without confronting his father. He tells William that he is not well-adjusted, recounting an incident in seventh grade in which he pretended to have appendicitis to get sympathy. After a classmate asked to see the scar, he self-inflicted a wound with a pair of scissors and still keeps the cards he received under his bed. William attempts to fake a heart attack, and Jeff leaves. He hugs Willy Jr. and thanks Britta for making him confront his father.

Meanwhile, members of the study group arrive for Shirley's dinner and find her in-laws unpleasant. They hide in the garage and plan to escape. Annie (Alison Brie) fakes period pain but the ruse falls through as Shirley's sister-in-law is a gynecologist. The group take turns interacting with Shirley's relatives while amusing themselves in the garage. In an attempt to escape, Pierce (Chevy Chase) purposefully trips over a rug and walks into a corner of a table, but the relatives find this hilarious, and Pierce is enthused by their positive response.

Troy (Donald Glover), Annie, and Abed (Danny Pudi) are about to eat expired bean dip to escape the event when Shirley arrives. She admits that she invited them because she dislikes her in-laws, who act rudely towards her. The group then plan a way to allow Shirley to escape the party, but she rejects the idea because of the value she places on family. The group agree to stay with her. Later, Jeff throws the group a surprise Thanksgiving dinner in the study room.

In the end tag, Shirley discovers a hole Abed made in her garage and plans to use it next Thanksgiving.

== Analysis ==
The storyline with members of the group trapped at Shirley's family Thanksgiving party parodies the 1994 prison drama The Shawshank Redemption. Abed narrates the storyline in a style similar to that of the film's narrator Morgan Freeman.

== Reception ==
Upon its first broadcast in the United States, an estimated 3.29 million viewers watched the episode.

Emily St. James of The A.V. Club gave the episode a B+, finding the comedy "basically fine" and approving of the dramatic moments between Jeff and his dad. However, she disliked Willy Jr.'s character. Eric Goldman of IGN rated the episode 7 out of 10, finding it an improvement over preceding episodes. Goldman found the storyline with Jeff and his dad "pretty successful", praising Brolin's acting and finding Britta's presence "good and funny" though "odd", but criticized the prison parody as "half-baked" and "gratuitous". Gabrielle Moss of TV Fanatic rated the episode 3.8 out of 5, praising the acting of McHale and Brolin but finding that Jeff's dad lacked characterization and the episode's message was unclear.

Sean Gandert of Paste found that the episode "did a good job honoring the complexity" of Jeff's relationship to his father, but that the other storyline was a "by-the-numbers lame pop culture parody". Josh Gondelman of Vulture reviewed the episode negatively, believing it to have improperly dealt with serious character revelations, such as Jeff recounting a childhood infliction of self-harm. Gondelman found the prison parody storyline to use "references-as-comedy" and fail to "capitalize on the setup", also criticizing Troy's "unironic anxiety" over Batman's sexuality as homophobic.
