= History 101 (Community) =

- Community episode
- Episode no.: Season 4 Episode 1
- Directed by: Tristram Shapeero
- Written by: Andy Bobrow
- Production code: 401
- Original air date: February 7, 2013

Guest appearances
- Fred Willard as Alternate Pierce Hawthorne; Irene Choi as Annie Kim; Richard Erdman as Leonard; Charley Koontz as Fat Neil; Danielle Kaplowitz as Vicki

Episode chronology
← Previous "Introduction to Finality"	Next → "Paranormal Parentage"
- Community season 4

"History 101" is the first episode of the fourth season and 72nd overall episode of Community, which originally aired on February 7, 2013 on NBC. The episode was written by Andy Bobrow and directed by Tristram Shapeero. The episode makes heavy use of a parody focusing on The Hunger Games. This episode marks the first in the series to have no involvement from series creator Dan Harmon, although he was credited as an executive consultant.

== Plot ==
The episode begins in an imaginary version of Greendale Community College created in the mind of Abed (Danny Pudi), titled "Abed's Happy Community College Show", which features parody elements poking fun at sitcom cliches, including the use of multi-camera production, a laugh track and the character of "Pierce" (Chevy Chase) being portrayed by a guest star (Fred Willard). Abed is using the fictional show as a coping mechanism to deal with fear of losing the study group following graduation.

In the real world, the study group assembles at Greendale to take part in their new History class ("History of Ice Cream"), only to discover that the class was over-booked due to forgery. Dean Pelton (Jim Rash), in an effort to award seats to the appropriate number of students, organizes The Hunger Deans, a series of physical challenges which will grant seats in the class.

During the episode, Troy (Donald Glover) and Britta's (Gillian Jacobs) newfound relationship becomes strained, and Annie (Alison Brie) attempts to pull pranks on the dean with the help of Shirley (Yvette Nicole Brown). Jeff (Joel McHale), desperate to prove he has changed for the better, takes part in the dean's games to earn the study group seats in the class after upsetting the group by revealing he planned to graduate early without them.

Abed becomes increasingly strained by the prospect of the group's graduation, and further retreats into his mind, creating a TV show within the fictional TV Show in his mind, called Greendale Babies, portraying the group as animated infants that will be together forever.

Eventually, the group bands together to help Abed. Inside the fictional "Abed's Happy Community College Show", Jeff delivers a speech implying that the group will always be friends (despite the fact Jeff in the real world gives no speech), and Abed is able to accept the fact that the group will not disband after graduation. The group is unable to make it into "History of Ice Cream".

After, it is revealed that Dean Pelton has moved in next door to Jeff at his apartment building and that Greendale will have to offer another history class or lose "like $40,000 in grant money." Chang (Ken Jeong), naked and delirious, approaches a mailman on the street, handing him a note that says: "Hello, my name is Kevin. I have Changnesia."

== Production ==
This is the first episode of the series without the involvement of series creator Dan Harmon. New showrunners David Guarascio and Moses Port served as executive producers for the fourth season. The episode was written by co-executive producer Andy Bobrow, and was directed by Tristram Shapeero, who had directed several episodes in past seasons and is now an executive producer and the primary director for the fourth season.

== Reception ==
The episode was seen by approximately 3.88 million viewers when it premiered. The episode was the highest-rated episode since "Urban Matrimony and the Sandwich Arts", which aired on March 15, 2012.

Eric Goldman of IGN rated the episode 8 out of 10, remarking that he felt "cautiously hopeful about a show that has gone through many changes". Emily St. James gave it a B grade in her review for The A.V. Club, saying the show was still "often hilarious, well-acted, well-directed, [and] well-written" but was beginning to show its age and feel emptier. In a discussion for Slate, Aisha Harris and Abby Ohlheiser found that the episode "stumbled" but kept themselves from judging too harshly given that this was Guarascio and Port's first episode.
