= Heroic Origins =

- Community episode
- Episode no.: Season 4 Episode 12
- Directed by: Victor Nelli Jr.
- Written by: Steve Basilone; Annie Mebane; Maggie Bandur
- Production code: 412
- Original air date: May 2, 2013

Guest appearances
- Joe Lo Truglio as Mark; Iqbal Theba as Gobi Nadir; Natasha Leggero as Mysti; Luke Youngblood as Magnitude; Jordan Black as Dean Spreck; Crystal the Monkey as Annie's Boobs

Episode chronology
← Previous "Basic Human Anatomy"	Next → "Advanced Introduction to Finality"
- Community season 4

"Heroic Origins" is the 12th and penultimate episode of the fourth season and 83rd overall episode of the NBC sitcom Community, which originally aired on May 2, 2013.

In this episode, Abed pieces together the past timelines of the group to show their lives have always been intertwined.

The episode was written by Steve Basilone, Annie Mebane, and Maggie Bandur, and directed by Victor Nelli Jr.

== Plot ==
As the group studies for their history final, Abed (Danny Pudi) reveals he is actually studying the group's history. Abed believes the group was destined to meet and had crossed paths before meeting at Greendale. Abed explains in 2008, the group had several coincidental meetings between its members. Annie (Alison Brie) and Troy (Donald Glover) had attended the same high school; Annie had a crush on Troy, but he didn’t seem to notice. Troy reveals he actually did notice, as it was her words that made Troy fake an injury so he wouldn’t have to deal with the pressures of being recruited for college football. At a party, Troy was deemed "most likely to succeed," enraging Annie, who was also addicted to prescription drugs at the time. She screamed at Troy that he wouldn't amount to anything, then charged through a glass door (the broken glass popped two balloons, inspiring Magnitude's catch phrase).

Abed and Shirley (Yvette Nicole Brown) had both been at the mall one day. Shirley was buying lingerie for a romantic date with her husband Andre, while Abed had been standing outside a movie theater to warn moviegoers to not see Star Wars: The Phantom Menace. Abed accosted two little boys attempting to see the movie (who happened to be Shirley's children), causing Abed to get a restraining order from the theater and attend therapy sessions. As Abed headed to meet the therapist, he spotted Annie stealing the doctor's prescription pad and warned the doctor, presumably leading to Annie getting caught. To pick up her kids, Shirley was forced to leave Andre on a date at the same restaurant where Jeff (Joel McHale) and his client, a stripper, were also eating. Jeff had successfully defended her in a case, where Britta (Gillian Jacobs) had been staging a rally to support the case. The stripper told Jeff she was talking to a married man, implied to be Andre. Having just received news that he was to be disbarred due to a lack of a college degree, Jeff encouraged her to pursue him.

In the present, Abed believes himself to be the villain of the group, as he had caused Shirley to leave the restaurant to get her kids and Annie to get in trouble for drugs. Jeff, however, believes he is responsible after encouraging the stripper to have an affair with Andre. The group then disbands, feeling awkward about their past meetings. Later, they all independently meet up at the same place for frozen yogurt. Jeff realizes that perhaps it was fate they all met, and they realize they all decided in this very place that they would attend Greendale. Chang (Ken Jeong) had been passing out fliers for Greendale that day, and the group had also observed an old man, implied to be Pierce (Chevy Chase), break a frozen yogurt machine and then fake a heart attack.

Meanwhile, Chang, who is still faking his amnesia and secretly working with the dean of City College, offers to mail an envelope from Dean Pelton (Jim Rash) containing the lease renewal for the college. Chang initially plans to steal the envelope, but Abed meets with him later, telling him he is the reason the group had all attended Greendale and deserves to be one of them. Chang is touched, deciding to join the group and mail the envelope. He later calls Steven Spreck (Jordan Black), the dean of City College, telling him he is out, but the dean decides to switch to "Plan B" and laughs maniacally while viewing a blueprint of a giant robot spider.

== Continuity ==
During the flashback of the group independently being at the mall for frozen yogurt, the song "Don't You (Forget About Me)" by Simple Minds can be heard in the background. This song was featured in the pilot episode of the series which was dedicated to John Hughes, the director of the film The Breakfast Club, for which the song was the main anthem.

Early in the episode, Abed asks Britta if she has ever taken photos of her feet and put them on the internet for money. Britta replies "No" in a laughing and defensive way, implying that she actually had done so. In the pilot episode, Britta tells Jeff she did "a little foot modeling." (Counting the episodes "Foosball and Nocturnal Vigilantism" and "Intro to Felt Surrogacy," it is the fourth indirect reference to foot fetishism of the series.)

== Reception ==
In its original broadcast, "Heroic Origins" was seen by 2.67 million American viewers and achieved a 1.2 rating in the 18-49 demographic. It placed fourth in overall viewership in its time slot, behind The Big Bang Theory, American Idol, and Wife Swap.
