= Mike Hagerty =

American actor (1954–2022)

- Born: Michael Gerard Hagerty; May 10, 1954; Chicago, Illinois, U.S.
- Died: May 5, 2022 (aged 67); Los Angeles, California, U.S.
- Education: University of Illinois at Chicago
- Occupation: Actor
- Years active: 1983–2022
- Spouse: Mary Kathryn

Michael Gerard Hagerty (May 10, 1954 – May 5, 2022) was an American actor. He was known for playing comedic blue-collar workers, including his recurring roles as Mr. Treeger, the building superintendent, on Friends and the manager of a muffler shop on HBO's Lucky Louie.

== Early life ==
Hagerty was born in Chicago, Illinois, on May 10, 1954. His family was Irish Catholic, and his father worked as a police officer. Hagerty completed his primary education at St. Cajetan Elementary School in 1968, before attending Marist High School in his hometown. He then studied at the University of Illinois at Chicago, where he took acting classes. Before becoming an actor, Hagerty worked at a restaurant in Evergreen Plaza and a Shell gas station and repair shop on Western Avenue.

== Career ==
Hagerty started acting after being invited by Jim Belushi to join the improv group The Second City. He went on to co-write and co-star in three revues on the troupe's mainstage during the 1980s (Also Available in Paperback — A Retrospective, Orwell That Ends Well, and True Midwest, or No, But I Saw the Movie). He also introduced the lyrics of "Bear Down, Chicago Bears" to its cast and had them memorize and sing the song. He subsequently began acting in films and television shows, beginning with Doctor Detroit in 1983. Hagerty became known for his mustache and thick Chicago accent.

Although the majority of his career was spent in television, Hagerty had small roles in many films, and ultimately garnered over 100 acting credits throughout his career. He was recognized for his small character roles in a wide range of popular comedies, including Martin, Cheers, The Wayans Bros., Curb Your Enthusiasm, Friends, Seinfeld, and The Wonder Years. He was one of twenty actors to appear in both Friends and Seinfeld. Hagerty was also a regular on The George Carlin Show, which was his first recurring television role. One of his final acting roles was Somebody Somewhere, which he was still filming at the time of his death.

== Personal life ==
Hagerty was married to Mary Kathryn until his death.

Hagerty relocated to Los Angeles during the 1980s. He maintained ties to his hometown, appearing at community fundraisers at the Beverly Arts Center and the local Catholic church. He was scheduled to be in Naperville, Illinois, and adjacent neighborhoods to start filming the second season of Somebody Somewhere shortly before his death.

== Death ==
Hagerty died on May 5, 2022 at Cedars-Sinai Medical Center in Los Angeles; he was 67 years old. He was in a coma after suffering from a seizure caused by an adverse reaction to antibiotics he was taking for an infection in his leg.

== Filmography ==
=== Film ===
Year	Title	Role	Note(s)
1983	Doctor Detroit	Cop #2	
1985	Brewster's Millions	Furniture Warehouseman	
1986	Nothing in Common	Eric	
1986	One More Saturday Night	Cop	
1987	Overboard	Billy Pratt	As Michael Hagerty
1988	Red Heat	Pat Nunn	As Michael Hagerty
1990	Dick Tracy	Doorman	As Michael G. Hagerty
1990	After Dark, My Sweet	Truck Driver	As Michael G. Hagerty
1991	One Good Cop	Det. Walsh	As Michael G. Hagerty
1991	V.I. Warshawski	Babe	As Michael G. Hagerty
1992	Wayne's World	Davy	As Michael G. Hagerty
1992	Frozen Assets	Voice Actor	Voice (as Michael G. Hagerty)
1993	So I Married an Axe Murderer	Obituary Writer	As Michael G. Hagerty
1995	Stuart Saves His Family	Cop	As Michael G. Hagerty
1996	Space Truckers	Tommy	As Michael G. Hagerty
1997	Speed 2: Cruise Control	Harvey	As Michael Hagerty
1998	Break Up	George	As Michael Hagerty
1999	Best Laid Plans	Charlie	As Michael G. Hagerty
1999	Austin Powers: The Spy Who Shagged Me	Peanut Vendor	
1999	Inspector Gadget	Sikes	Voice (as Michael G. Hagerty)
2001	Backflash	Red	Direct to-video
2002	Frank McKlusky, C.I.	Earl	
2006	Rampage: The Hillside Strangler Murders	Detective Smith	
2006	The Last Time	Breckenridge	As Michael Hagerty
2011	Thin Ice	Jerry	
2012	An Old Man's Gold	Detective Carolina	
2014	Back In the Day	Principal Teagley	
2014	All Stars	Mike Garland	
2017	Urban Myth: Nest	Vito	Short film
2021	Apache Junction	George Hearst	

=== Television ===
Year	Title	Role	Note(s)
1986	Cheers	Decker	Episode: "Strange Bedfellows: Part 1" (as Michael G. Hagerty)
1986	Crime Story	Schaffel / Furniture Salesman	Episodes: "St. Louis Book of Blues" and "Shadow Dancer"
1987	Married... with Children	Coroner	Episode: "You Better Watch Out"
1988	Family Ties	Vinnie	Episode: "The Boys Next Door"
1989
1989	Murphy Brown	Howard Sutthoff	Episode: "The Bickners"
1990	Dear John	Al	Episode: "John's Night Out" (as Michael G. Hagerty)
1990	Sydney	Vlad	Episode: "Cliffhanger"
1990	Lola	Moving Man	TV movie
1990	Get a Life	The Engineer	Episode: "Terror on the Hell Loop 2000" (as Michael G. Hagerty)
1991	American Dreamer	Davey	Episode: "Heartbreak Diner" (as Michael G. Hagerty)
1991	Drexell's Class	Roger	Episode: "Silent Night, Holy Smokes" (as Michael G. Hagerty)
1991–1994	Star Trek: The Next Generation	Skoran / Capt. Larg	Episodes: "Redemption II" and "Thine Own Self" (as Michael G. Hagerty)
1992	The Wonder Years	Clerk	Episode: "The Lost Weekend" (as Michael G. Hagerty)
1992	Civil Wars	Dominic Onofrio	Episode: "Grin and Bare It" (as Michael G. Hagerty)
1992	Martin	Santa Claus / The Plumber	Episodes: "I Saw Gina Kissing Santa Claus" and "Dead Men Don't Flush" (as Michael Hagerty)
1993	Rio Diablo	Dyke Holland	TV movie (as Michael G. Hagerty)
1993	The Building	Finley	5 episodes
1994	Seinfeld	Rudy	Episode: "The Raincoats"
1994–1995	The George Carlin Show	Frank McNamara	Regular role, 23 episodes
1995	The Wayans Bros.	Brazilla	Episode: "Brazilla vs. Rodney"
1995	Kirk	Head Usher at Movie Theater	Episode: "Night at the Movies"
1995–2001	Friends	Mr. Treeger	5 episodes
1996	Sisters	Stuart	Episode: "Housecleaning"
1996	The Drew Carey Show	Beer Guy	Episode: "Buzz Beer"
1996	The Faculty		Episode: "Clark's Crisis" (as Michael G. Hagerty)
1997	Union Square	Ron	Episode: "The First Christmas Show"
1997	Grace Under Fire	Mr. Ricky	Episode: "Riverboat Queen"
1998	Ally McBeal	Michael Huttle	Episode: "Alone Again" (as Michael Hagerty)
1999	Arli$$	Zeke	Episode: "Our Past, Our Present, Our Future" (as Michael G. Hagerty)
2000	The Michael Richards Show	Golgi	Episode: "Mr. Irresistible" (as Michael G. Hagerty)
2000	Curb Your Enthusiasm	AAMCO Guy Mike Duffy	Episode: "AAMCO"
2000	The Near Future	The Killer	TV movie (as Michael G. Hagerty)
2001	Angel	Bartender	Episode: "Happy Anniversary"
2001–2002	Nikki	Stan / Store Manager	2 episodes (as Michael G. Hagerty)
2002	ER	Mr. James	Episode: "It's All in Your Head"
2003–2004	Life with Bonnie	Bill / Captain Lenderfak	Episode: "Don't Stress, Express" and "Assaulted Nuts"
2004	Deadwood	Loud Wagoneer	Episode: "Deadwood" (as Michael Hagerty)
2004	Complete Savages	Uncle Bob	Episode: "Thanksgiving with the Savages"
2005
2005	American Dad!	Cop #1 / Editor (voice)	Episode: "Not Particularly Desperate Housewife" (as Michael G. Hagerty)
2006	Desperate Housewives	Gus	Episode: "I Know Things Now"
2006–2007	Lucky Louie	Mike	Recurring role, 13 episodes
2007	Boston Legal	Wally Bird	Episode: "Son of the Defender"
2007	Entourage	Boat Rental Operator	Episode: "Less Than 30"
2007	Ghost Whisperer	Mayor Alex Millio	Episode: "The Gathering"
2008	CSI: Crime Scene Investigation	Hal Jackmin	Episode: "Woulda, Coulda, Shoulda"
2009	Monk	Ronnie O'Dell	Episode: "Mr. Monk on Wheels"
2010	'Til Death	Rick	Episode: "Coupon Bob"
2010	Medium	Large Man	Episode: "There Will Be Blood... Type A"
2010	Good Luck Charlie	Captain Stretchy	Episode: "Baby Come Back"
2010	Glee	Pete Sosnowski	Episode: "Special Education"
2011	Happy Endings	Cop	Episode: "Bo Fight"
2012	The Mindy Project	Gene Putch	Episode: "Thanksgiving"
2013	Community	Sully	Episode: "Advanced Documentary Filmmaking"
2013	Grey's Anatomy	Al Keller	Episode: "Sleeping Monster"
2013	Mob City	Fat Jack Bray	Recurring role, 5 episodes
2013–2017	Brooklyn Nine-Nine	Captain McGintley	3 episodes
2014
2014	The Goldbergs	Terence	Episode: "Love Is a Mix Tape"
2014	Marry Me	Officer Stackhouse	Episode: "Move Me"
2015–2017	Hot Flash: The Chronicles of Lara Tate - Menopausal Superhero	Malcolm	2 episodes
2016	Shameless	Ron	Episodes: "Familia Supra Gallegorious Omnia!" and "The F Word"
2021	Chicago Party Aunt	(voice)	Episode: "Tailgate Jailgate"
2022	Somebody Somewhere	Ed Miller	6 episodes

=== Video games ===
Year	Title	Role	Note(s)
1996	Star Trek: Klingon	Bartender	As Michael G. Hagerty
