= Herstory of Dance =

- Community episode
- Episode no.: Season 4 Episode 8
- Directed by: Tristram Shapeero
- Written by: Jack Kukoda
- Production code: 407
- Original air date: April 4, 2013

Guest appearances
- Brie Larson as Rachel; Sophie B. Hawkins as herself

Episode chronology
← Previous "Economics of Marine Biology"	Next → "Intro to Felt Surrogacy"
- Community season 4

"Herstory of Dance" is the 8th episode of the fourth season and 79th episode overall of the NBC sitcom Community, which originally aired on April 4, 2013.

When Dean Pelton plans a Sadie Hawkins dance, Britta throws a Sophie B. Hawkins dance in protest. At the dance Abed goes on two dates, one set up by Annie and one by Shirley.

== Plot ==
Dean Pelton (Jim Rash), dressed as a woman from a black & white TV serial, announces that there will be an old-fashioned sock hop held in the cafeteria, as a Sadie Hawkins dance — in other words, a distraction while the CDC confiscates the drinking fountains on the same day. Citing the dance as sexist, Britta (Gillian Jacobs) counter-announces that she will be holding a Sophie B. Hawkins dance. The rest of the study group try to correct her, pointing out that she may have meant Susan B. Anthony. Britta, who is fed up with the group and particularly Jeff (Joel McHale) using "Britta'd" as shorthand for "completely screwed up", (Note: As first seen in "Horror Fiction in Seven Spooky Steps.") refuses to admit she was wrong.

Abed (Danny Pudi) is trying to make an effort to branch out socially and to stop filtering everything through television. Annie (Alison Brie) asks if she can set him up with a date to go to the dean's dance, but Shirley (Yvette Nicole Brown) wants to do the same for Britta's dance. Shirley and Annie agree that they will introduce Abed to both their respective choices and let him decide who he ultimately goes to the dance with, but their competitive approach pressures Abed into choosing both, allowing him to live out the two-simultaneous-dates sitcom trope.

Britta is having trouble securing Sophie B. Hawkins' appearance at the dance and confides in Pierce (Chevy Chase) about the dilemma. He gives her sincere advice about never backing down, though it appears that a reference from Britta also makes him realize he lost a lot of money to Bernie Madoff. Jeff finds Britta's Craigslist advertisement asking for Sophie B. Hawkins or an impersonator and arrogantly tells her that he "appreciates" her commitment to the lie (from his own legal background, he can relate), but it's time for her to admit the truth and accept the mocking he and the group are waiting to bestow upon her latest "Britta'd" before it becomes a full-on "Britta-strophe."

Abed goes to the dance with both Annie's selection Kat (Wendy McColm) and Shirley's selection Jessica (Kristen Henry King), attempting to do so without either knowing of the other. While changing his outfit in the coat room, he meets Rachel (Brie Larson), who is running the coat check, and she helps him out with his scheme. The two grow closer, but Abed is so caught up in his scheme that he accidentally hurts her feelings when he fails to recognize a romantic moment. Eventually Annie and Shirley realize Abed is on two dates, for which he apologizes. After deciding which of the dates to continue exclusively, he realizes that he has more in common and more fun with Rachel, but she has already left the dance.

Toward the end of the night the students chant for Sophie B. Hawkins, and Britta takes the stage to admit that the singer will not be coming. To her surprise, Hawkins indeed arrives and sings to great applause from the students. Abed interrupts the performance, professing that him having simultaneous dates was wrong and that he would rather spend more time with Rachel, who has now come back to the dance. They spend the rest of dance holding hands.

Pierce reveals to a surprised Jeff that he arranged for Hawkins to appear, through his moist towelette company's bond with her from when it supplied the Lilith Fair. Jeff asks him why, to which Pierce points out his rude behavior to Britta and that after all she's done for him, he should treat her with more respect. Jeff congratulates Britta via text on holding a successful dance, leaving her smiling when he tells her "you Britta'd the hell out of this thing".

== Production ==
It was directed by executive producer Tristram Shapeero, who directs seven of the thirteen season 4 episodes.

This aired as episode eight, but was the seventh episode produced. It also premiered without its Sophie B. Hawkins end tag (seen on DVD), instead using the "Intro to Felt Surrogacy" end credits as a sneak peek, with brief voiceover to that effect by Danny Pudi.

== Reception ==
The episode was seen by approximately 2.32 million viewers. This is the lowest watched episode in the history of the series.

The episode was met with mixed reviews at the time. Pilot Viruet of The A.V. Club rated the episode positively with a B+, saying, "tonight's [episode] reminded me that, despite any misgivings I've had recently, I'm still really going to miss this show when it ends." Alan Sepinwall of HitFix said the episode "was fairly underwhelming." and Gabrielle Moss of TV Fanatic was on the negative side, saying, "this episode didn't have soul."

Later assessments are more positive. In 2015, Mark Harrison writing for Den of Geek, characterized the episode "one of the highlights" of the fourth season. In 2020, Ben Jessey of ScreenRant wrote of the episode it was one of the few season four episodes "that truly matched the quality of the early years".
