= Digital Estate Planning =

- Community episode
- Episode no.: Season 3 Episode 20
- Directed by: Adam Davidson
- Written by: Matt Warburton
- Production code: 322
- Original air date: May 17, 2012

Guest appearances
- Giancarlo Esposito as Gilbert Lawson; Larry Cedar as Cornelius Hawthorne (voice only)

Episode chronology
← Previous "Curriculum Unavailable"	Next → "The First Chang Dynasty"
- Community season 3

"Digital Estate Planning" is the 20th episode of the third season of the U.S. television series Community and 69th episode of the series overall. It originally aired on May 17, 2012, on NBC. The episode featured retro video game–styled graphics and a synthesizer-driven soundtrack reminiscent of 8-bit consoles such as the Nintendo Entertainment System and Master System, with references to multiple classic games on those and later consoles.

The episode was written by Matt Warburton and directed by Adam Davidson.

== Plot ==
Pierce (Chevy Chase) invites the study group, as well as LeVar Burton, who does not show up, to a warehouse. Upon arrival, the study group is greeted by Gilbert Lawson (Giancarlo Esposito), Pierce's deceased father Cornelius Hawthorne's (voiced by Larry Cedar) assistant of thirty years, and estate executor. He informs them of Cornelius's last will and testament, whose dying wish was for Pierce and seven friends to play a video game that was developed for thirty years, in response to a request made by Pierce in 1979 to invest in video games.

The group enters a stylized 8-bit video game world full of Cornelius's numerous prejudiced beliefs. They are informed by the in-game voice recording of Cornelius that, as punishment for questioning the economic viability of moist towelettes, the first player to reach the "Throne of Hawkthorne" at the end of the game will win Pierce's inheritance. The group rejects this and vows to give Pierce his inheritance, but Gilbert, taking on the role of the eighth player, reveals that he intends to do so. With complete knowledge of the game he easily kills the group's characters, sending them back to respawn at the start.

After restarting, the group arrives at a town where Abed falls in love with an NPC named Hilda. While exploring the town, Britta mixes random ingredients in a cauldron into what she assumes is a strength potion. Meanwhile, Annie and Shirley accidentally kill the town's blacksmith and his wife (Hilda's parents), then steal everything in the shop and burn it down to cover their tracks. Gilbert appears, having leveled up, and begins easily attacking the group again. However, after Britta dies, Jeff tricks Gilbert into drinking the potion she made, and Gilbert dies when it turns out to be poison. Starting back from the beginning again, Gilbert ruthlessly decides to use cheat codes, turning his character invincible.

The group continues playing, while Abed stays back in town to help Hilda rebuild her life. After beating most of the game, the group finds the "white crystal" needed to enter the castle on the last level. They are again confronted by Gilbert, who kills them and takes the crystal for himself. Jeff and Pierce realize he is cheating and physically confront him outside of the game, where Gilbert reveals that he is Cornelius's illegitimate son and Pierce's half-brother, the product of Cornelius impregnating Pierce's childhood nanny's "hot cousin"; he claims that he has a greater right to the fortune than Pierce, having been more of a son to Cornelius. He also tells them that the seats have weight sensors that will forfeit them in 30 seconds if they sense that they are not seated in them, so the group begrudgingly restarts. They return to the town where they left Abed to discover that he has built an enormous castle with Hilda and has an endless amount of resources to build whatever they desire.

Gilbert arrives at the final stage of the game, where he is greeted by a recording from Cornelius. He "congratulates" Gilbert on his victory but says that in order to claim the inheritance, Gilbert must agree to sign a document disavowing any family ties to Cornelius and keeping his infidelity secret. Gilbert refuses, prompting Cornelius to start an all-out war of destruction against him.

The study group arrives heavily armed with new equipment and defeats Cornelius, at the cost of their lives. Gilbert is left to claim the inheritance but rejects it, believing he does not deserve the prize. The study group decides to forfeit, Pierce having decided that Gilbert, having put up with Cornelius' humiliating racism and selfishness and endured worse abuse, makes him more worthy of taking the inheritance. Gilbert thanks them and beats the game, winning the inheritance. He offers to treat the study group to margaritas in yard-long bottles as thanks and bonds with Pierce as half-brothers. As the group leaves, Abed sneaks back to copy Hilda from the game onto a flash drive before leaving.

== Production ==
According to Dan Harmon, "Digital Estate Planning" was the last Season 3 episode to be filmed, and led to a heated argument between him and Chevy Chase. The episode's "tag" (run during the credits) was written to feature Abed showing Pierce the flash drive copy of the game, modified to have the virtual version of Pierce playing ball with a giant head of Cornelius, with Cornelius congratulating him every time. Pierce would have then turned to hug Abed as a way of saying thanks. Harmon considered it "one of the most important moments of the season". Chase refused to shoot the scene and left for the day, allegedly because he was tired. Harmon noted that this was a common experience with Chase and they simply would have shot Chase's scenes in the following days. In this case, as it was the final day of shooting, the sets were subsequently torn down and they could not re-shoot it, leading to Harmon's disappointment in losing the scene. This subsequently led to a confrontation between the two during the season's wrap party.

The video game sequences were animated by Titmouse, which had previously animated segments for the show.

The 8-bit chiptune score for the episode was produced by sci-fi artist Simon Stålenhag.

After the episode aired, a Reddit user named Derferman made an open-source version of the game seen in the episode for Windows, OS X, and Linux, complete with multiple playable characters, several stages, and music and sound effects.

== Reception ==
In its original broadcast on May 17, 2012, the episode was watched by an estimated 2.97 million people, with a 1.3/5 share in the 18–49 demographic.

IGN gave the episode a rating of 8 out of 10, calling it "a visual good time".
