= Introduction to Finality =

- Community episode
- Episode no.: Season 3 Episode 22
- Directed by: Tristram Shapeero
- Written by: Steve Basilone; Annie Mebane
- Production code: 321
- Original air date: May 17, 2012

Guest appearances
- Richard Erdman as Leonard Rodriguez; John Goodman as Vice Dean Laybourne; Rob Corddry as Alan; Dan Bakkedahl as Murray; Jordan Black as Dean Spreck (uncredited cameo); Hal Rudnick as Dennis

Episode chronology
← Previous "The First Chang Dynasty"	Next → "History 101"
- Community season 3

"Introduction to Finality" is the 22nd and final episode of the third season of the American television series Community and 71st episode of the show overall. It originally aired on May 17, 2012 on NBC. This was the last episode to air with series creator Dan Harmon as showrunner before he was fired, though Harmon would later return as showrunner for the fifth season.

== Plot ==
Continuing from the previous episode, Troy is enrolled at the Air Conditioning Repair Annex, where Vice Dean Laybourne has declared him "The Truest Repairman," though Troy laments that he is no longer with his friends. After Laybourne accidentally dies from Freon inhalation while repairing an air conditioner, Troy becomes suspicious. The new Vice Dean Murray's (Dan Bakkedahl) willingness to let him return to Greendale only adds to his suspicion. Troy realizes that Murray sabotaged and killed Laybourne, and challenges him to do battle in the 'Sun Chamber,' a duel to fix an air conditioner in an enclosed chamber before the rising heat kills one of them. Troy quickly fixes his air conditioner, cooling his chamber as Murray's gets hotter. During the challenge, Murray admits to killing Laybourne and passes out from heat exhaustion. Troy sees Laybourne's ghost and decides to save Murray by fixing his air conditioner. As the other repairmen prepare to punish Murray, Troy suggests simply calling the police, berating the other repairmen for their weirdness, and promptly leaves.

Dean Pelton announces that Subway has pulled their store from school cafeteria, letting Shirley open her sandwich shop, "Shirley's Sandwiches," in the vacant space. Pierce and Shirley get into an argument over who should get to sign off as the official owner of the shop, Shirley having done all the work while Pierce financed it. Shirley asks Jeff, who is preoccupied studying for his biology final, for help, much to his annoyance. After Pierce threatens to sue, the dean suggests taking the matter to the student court. Jeff agrees to help Shirley before his exam, while Pierce hires his rival Alan (Rob Corddry) as his lawyer. During the case, Alan, having replaced Ted as manager of the firm after Ted's death, tells Jeff that if he doesn't throw the case then he will make it impossible for him to return to the firm after he graduates. Shirley surprises Jeff by admitting that the situation has put him in an unfair position and jeopardized his professional future, giving him the OK to tank her case. Inspired, Jeff decides that helping others is more important than helping himself. Moved by his words, Pierce drops the case and fires Alan. Furious, Alan tells Jeff he is done as a lawyer and that he was the one who ratted Jeff out. Jeff reveals that he already knew this and thanks Alan for it, leaving Alan to storm out in defeat. Pierce and Shirley ask Jeff to act as their attorney and sign off as the owner for both of them.

With Troy having moved out, Abed begins to stress, and Evil Abed (Note: As first seen in "Remedial Chaos Theory.") soon consumes him. Instead of allowing Britta to provide therapy, he performs a harsh psychological analysis of her, leaving her distraught. He decides to try to recreate the darkest timeline, in which Jeff has lost an arm. Before getting the chance to physically cut off Jeff's arm with a bone saw, Evil Abed hears Jeff's speech about selflessness and turns back into good Abed.

The episode closes with a montage. Shirley and Pierce open their sandwich shop in the cafeteria to much delight. Abed reconciles with Britta, saying she's the only shrink he would trust to help him because neither of them have any control over his mind. Troy returns to his friends, now that he is considered the "messiah" of the Air Conditioning Repair Annex and has made them start running it as a regular part of Greendale. Jeff successfully passes his biology final and decides to search online for his father. City College's Dean Spreck (Jordan Black) is shown plotting to wage war on Greendale. It is revealed that Star-Burns (Dino Stamatopoulos) faked his death. Although the Dreamatorium is shown being disassembled, with Troy now moving into that room, Abed secretly installs a miniature version in his blanket fort and steps inside. The screen fades to white with the hashtag #sixseasonsandamovie.

In the closing tag sequence, Leonard reviews a brand of potato chips called Let's via his YouTube page, putting emphasis on the words 'good' and 'buy' in a reference to this episode being the season finale.

== Reception ==
=== Ratings ===
"Introduction to Finality" (which aired at 9:30pm EST and was the third Community episode of the night) was watched by 2.48 million American viewers and received a 1.3/4 rating/share for adults 18 to 49.

=== Critical reception ===
Matt Richenthal of TV Fanatic gave the episode four stars out of five.

Entertainment Weekly ranked the scene with Star-Burns number six for "Single Most Clever Twist" for the 2012 TV Season Finale Awards.
