= Paranormal Parentage =

- Community episode
- Episode no.: Season 4 Episode 2
- Directed by: Tristram Shapeero
- Written by: Megan Ganz
- Production code: 403
- Original air date: February 14, 2013

Guest appearance
- Giancarlo Esposito as Gilbert

Episode chronology
← Previous "History 101"	Next → "Conventions of Space and Time"
- Community season 4

"Paranormal Parentage" is the 2nd episode of the fourth season and 73rd overall episode of Community. The episode was written by Megan Ganz and directed by Tristram Shapeero. Though a Halloween-themed episode—the fourth for the series—it premiered on February 14, 2013 on NBC. It shows the group searching Pierce's mansion for the code to his panic room, after he locks himself in there. It makes homage to Scooby-Doo. The episode was watched by 2.76 million viewers on its premiere and met with mixed critical reception.

== Plot ==
The study group meet on Halloween in costumes to go to Vicki's party, with the exception of Pierce (Chevy Chase), who has not been invited. Pierce calls Troy (Donald Glover) as they are leaving, asking for help. Though Jeff (Joel McHale) is reluctant, the group agree to go to Pierce's mansion, where he has locked himself in his panic room. Claiming to have done so accidentally and then saying it was because he saw his father Cornelius's ghost, he asks the group to search his house for the code.

Jeff and Britta (Gillian Jacobs) search together, with Britta attempting to make Jeff confront his issues with his father. In frustration, he eventually reveals that he has had his father's number for weeks but not called it. Meanwhile, Abed (Danny Pudi) abandons Annie (Alison Brie) after discovering a secret passage behind a bookshelf, leading Annie to become afraid, particularly after seeing Cornelius in a mirror. Abed finds a security room and concurrently watches Cougar Town and the group's activities. After finding a sex dungeon, which Troy does not understand the purpose of, Shirley (Yvette Nicole Brown) begins to worry about his new relationship with Britta, seeing Troy as too innocent. Abed finds surveillance footage of Pierce being watched in his sleep by an unknown individual.

Jeff finds the notebook containing the panic room code, but the room he is in appears to be haunted, with knocking on the door with no apparent source, a picture of Cornelius distorting, and the room beginning to rattle. He finds Britta and leaves. They stumble across Annie, Shirley, and Troy, who have witnessed the outline of hands begin to protrude through a wall. Reaching the outside of the panic room, they find an image of Pierce unconscious. Pierce surprises them from behind, having tried to scare the group as he felt left out from the party. However, he locks the panic room in fear after Abed mentions the footage of an unknown figure he saw. The figure arrives and opens the panic room—it is Gilbert (Giancarlo Esposito), Pierce's half-brother. After Cornelius' death, he arrived at the mansion and began discretely doing housework tasks out of loneliness. Pierce suggests that he move in, and the group departs. At home, Jeff calls his father.

== Production ==
The fourth season was initially scheduled to premiere on October 19, 2012, airing on Fridays at 8:30 pm. In early October 2012, NBC delayed the premiere. The first episode premiered on February 7, 2013, with the show in its time slot of previous seasons of Thursday at 8 p.m. As a result, though "Paranormal Parentage" was a Halloween-themed episode, it premiered on Valentine's Day. During its premiere, the network promoted the hashtag #ghostdad onscreen.

== Analysis ==
"Paranormal Parentage" was the fourth and final Halloween-themed episode of Community, following season 1's "Introduction to Statistics", season 2's "Epidemiology" and season 3's "Horror Fiction in Seven Spooky Steps". The mystery genre of the episode resembles the animated franchise Scooby-Doo, which previous episodes had also made tribute to the franchise. Abed mentions the movie 1989 Do the Right Thing, in which guest star Giancarlo Esposito had one of his earliest acting roles.

== Reception ==
Upon its first broadcast in the United States, an estimated 2.76 million viewers watched the episode.

Giving the episode a rating of 3.7 out of five, Gabrielle Moss of TV Fanatic found the episode lacking for fans, but a good introduction for new viewers. Vulture's Josh Gondelman rated the episode 3 out of 5. Gondelman found it largely self-referential, writing that: "We spend much of this episode watching the characters watch each other on screens". Emily VanDerWerff of The A.V. Club rated the episode a B+, reviewing that it was an improvement over "History 101". VanDerWerff praised the non-supernatural explanation of events and emotional moments involving Pierce and Jeff. However, she criticized that some character development from previous seasons had been ignored and thought the humor could be improved. Sean Gandert of Paste similarly criticized the characterization and found the episode to lack ingenuity or humor.

Rating it 7.2 out of 10, Eric Goldman of IGN reviewed the characters as "cartoonish" and found the episode to be mixed overall. Cory Barker of TV.com believed it to be roughly as good as "Introduction to Statistics" but inferior to the other Halloween episodes. Barker liked Jeff's storyline and some of the jokes. Britt Hayes of ScreenCrush criticized Chase's acting and found the rate of jokes to have decreased since Harmon's departure.
