= Economics of Marine Biology =

- Community episode
- Episode no.: Season 4 Episode 7
- Directed by: Tricia Brock
- Written by: Tim Saccardo
- Production code: 406
- Original air date: March 21, 2013

Guest appearances
- Zack Pearlman as Archie; Ian Roberts as Coach Chapman; Richard Erdman as Leonard; Erik Charles Nielsen as Garrett; Charley Koontz as Fat Neil; Danielle Kaplowitz as Vicki; Luke Youngblood as Magnitude; Jeremy Scott Johnson as Carl; Brady Novak as Richie

Episode chronology
← Previous "Advanced Documentary Filmmaking"	Next → "Herstory of Dance"
- Community season 4

"Economics of Marine Biology" is the 7th episode of the fourth season and 78th episode overall of the NBC sitcom Community, which originally aired on March 21, 2013.

Dean Pelton enlists the help of the study group in order to enroll a wealthy new student whose laziness is expected to bring much needed funds to Greendale.

== Plot ==
Dean Pelton (Jim Rash) asks the group to help Greendale recruit Archie (Zack Pearlman), a spoiled 22-year-old who has rich parents and, will likely inject Greendale with massive funds given that he spent seven years in high school. While the dean has set up wholesome activities to show Archie around the college, the school board wants to recruit him by any means necessary — including strippers, parties, and pretending Shaun White teaches at the school. After seeing Archie arrive with a new scooter gifted to him by City College, the dean chooses to throw his ideas out and take the school board's suggestions. Britta (Gillian Jacobs) refuses to do so, while Abed (Danny Pudi) decides to create a fake fraternity, leaving only the dean and Annie (Alison Brie).

Not wanting Pierce (Chevy Chase) to be jealous of the attention given to Archie, the dean asks Jeff (Joel McHale) to spend the day with him and take him off campus. They go to a barbershop where they have their beards shaved. Jeff expects it to be a bore but then starts enjoying it, saying he regrets ever shaving his face himself. Pierce intercepts a text message meant for Jeff and finds out that he was being distracted, becoming upset at the ruse. Jeff apologizes and asks the rest of the group to be nicer toward Pierce.

Troy (Donald Glover) and Shirley (Yvette Nicole Brown) start their first class of Physical Education, but the course is actually P.E.E. (Physical Education Education), where they are taught how to be gym teachers. Troy flounders under the pressure and is soon bullied by their coach (Ian Roberts), but Shirley is quite adept at the class and quickly becomes the top student. After a depressed Troy drops the class, Shirley comforts him and the two work together to help continue Chang's (Ken Jeong) rehabilitation, impressing the coach.

During a cafeteria party with strippers and balloons, Archie overhears Magnitude (Luke Youngblood) saying his catchphrase, "Pop! Pop!" In order to make his decision and enroll, Archie demands ownership of the catchphrase, to which the dean reluctantly agrees. The next day, the dean and Annie see a disheveled Magnitude, now struggling to cope with life and come up with a new catchphrase, and realize what they have done is morally wrong. The dean wakes up Archie, who has passed out from the partying, and tells him that the Greendale he experienced was not the real Greendale and that if he wanted a college that gave him special treatment it would be elsewhere. Archie still enrolls, appreciative of the honesty and being treated like normal.

The end tag features Troy and Britta are in bed together watching a "Let's Potato Chips" commercial. He gets upset when she is eating a rival potato chip brand named "Spingles" and tells her to go home.

== Production ==
This aired as episode seven, but was the sixth episode produced.

== Reception ==
The episode was initially watched by approximately 2.95 million viewers.

The episode was met with mixed reviews. Emily VanDerWerff of The A.V. Club rated the episode with a B, saying it was, "the most like an episode of classic Community that any episode has all season, but it’s also curiously hollow, without any thematic weight." where Alan Sepinwall of HitFix said it was, "perfectly decent example of the kind of campus hijinks episodes the series did a lot in season 1 before shifting towards more ambitious concepts in seasons 2 and 3." and Gabrielle Moss of TV Fanatic remarked, "Do you think I couldn't tell that the Abed frat micro-subplot was eighty times more interesting than anything actually happening on screen in this episode?" Eric Goldman of IGN gave the episode a positive score of 8.5, praising Chevy Chase's performance as Pierce.
