= The First Chang Dynasty =

- Community episode
- Episode no.: Season 3 Episode 21
- Directed by: Jay Chandrasekhar
- Written by: Matt Fusfeld; Alex Cuthbertson
- Production code: 320
- Original air date: May 17, 2012

Guest appearances
- John Goodman as Vice Dean Laybourne; J. P. Manoux as Faux-by; Richard Erdman as Leonard; Craig Cackowski as Officer Cackowski; Dan Bakkedahl as Murray; Ryan Lee as Joshua; Jeremy Scott Johnson as Carl; Brady Novak as Richie

Episode chronology
← Previous "Digital Estate Planning"	Next → "Introduction to Finality"
- Community season 3

"The First Chang Dynasty" is the 21st and penultimate episode of the third season and 70th overall episode of the American comedy television series Community. It aired in the United States on NBC on May 17, 2012. In the episode, the group must pull off an Ocean's Eleven-style heist in order to free Dean Pelton and reveal Chang's plan. It received mostly positive reviews.

== Plot ==
Officer Cackowski (Craig Cackowski) dismisses the group's story that Chang (Ken Jeong) has replaced Dean Pelton (Jim Rash) with an imposter (J. P. Manoux). He warns the former students that they will be arrested if they approach the campus.

As Greendale's new leader, Chang plans a lavish birthday celebration for himself. After struggling to gather reconnaissance, Troy (Donald Glover) turns to Murray (Dan Bakkedahl) from the air conditioning repair school. Murray reveals that Dean Pelton is locked in the cafeteria basement and explains Chang's new security measures. He offers additional help from the A/C school in exchange for Troy joining their program. The other group members, particularly Britta (Gillian Jacobs), oppose losing Troy and reject the offer. Instead, they plan their own operation.

During Chang's party, Shirley (Yvette Nicole Brown), disguised as a chef, deliberately clogs a toilet, while Annie (Alison Brie) pretends to be a security guard. Troy and Abed (Danny Pudi) arrive as plumbers to fix the toilet; they break through the bathroom wall to access security codes in Chang's office. Jeff (Joel McHale) and Britta, masquerading as magicians, steal Chang's keys during their performance. Suddenly, Pierce (Chevy Chase) enters in a swami outfit. Chang recognizes Pierce, seemingly ruining the operation, but the team intentionally structured the plan to look like it was failing. Chang ends up chasing the fake dean while the group frees the real dean. However, Chang wises up and stops the group before they can escape.

The entire group is locked in the basement. Before leaving, Chang reveals his plan to use a firework show to burn the records room and cover up his misdeeds, ignoring the group's warnings that doing so would burn down the entire school and kill everyone inside. As the group tries to escape, Troy nods to an A/C maintenance camera, causing a large fan blocking an exit to stop. The group celebrates, although Britta realizes what Troy has sacrificed. Using a distraction, they take out Chang's army of kids and prevent the fireworks from exploding. Chang arrives and confronts the group, but two school board members (Jeremy Scott Johnson and Brady Novak) find the fake dean and realize what happened, forcing Chang to flee. The board members worry about keeping the scandal quiet, but Dean Pelton promises to keep it under wraps.

Later, Troy honors his arrangement and prepares to move into the A/C school. The group shares parting words with him. He leaves with Murray for the school, where Vice Dean Laybourne (John Goodman) welcomes him.

== Production ==
The episode was written by Matt Fusfeld and Alex Cuthbertson and directed by Jay Chandrasekhar. It incorporates several references to heist films, particularly the film Ocean's Eleven.

The week before the episode's airing, the show was renewed for a 13-episode fourth season by NBC.

== Cultural references ==
The imagery of Chang's propaganda posters evokes that of Soviet and North Korean propaganda, as well as some parodying the "Change We Can Believe In" posters with "Chang We Can Believe In".

The scene when Chang catches up to the group in the records room is a reference to the climactic lightsaber duel between the Jedi and Darth Maul in The Phantom Menace, with Jeff wielding a blue stun baton and Chang wielding a double-ended red one. However, Chang runs away before the two can fight.

Chang's costume references Napoleon Bonaparte.

When Chang begins his keytar solo, he plays the first few bars of Axel F.

== Reception ==
=== Ratings ===
In its original broadcast, "The First Chang Dynasty" was seen by approximately 2.61 million Americans and achieved a 1.3/4 in the 18-49 demographic. It ranked fourth in its time slot behind the season finales of Grey's Anatomy and Person of Interest and an episode of Touch. The episode was the second of three episodes of Community aired that night, with an episode of 30 Rock placed between "Digital Estate Planning" and this episode and "Introduction to Finality" following it.

=== Reviews ===
The episode received mostly positive reviews from critics. In a joint review of the final three episodes, Emily VanDerWerff of The A.V. Club gave the episode an A−, praising its use of the tropes of heist movies and the emotional climax of Troy's departure. Robert Canning of IGN gave the episode 9 out of 10, denoting an "amazing" episode; he appreciated that the show provided closure for several storylines and enjoyed seeing Chang's regime and the study group's caper. Canning praised the focus on Chang following his relatively minor role throughout the season. Alan Sepinwall of Uproxx praised the episode as the best of the three final episodes in terms of humor and appreciated the show's handle of the tropes and style of caper films, though he thought Chang's arc was still weak.
