= Basic Human Anatomy =

- Community episode
- Episode no.: Season 4 Episode 11
- Directed by: Beth McCarthy-Miller
- Written by: Jim Rash
- Production code: 410
- Original air date: April 25, 2013

Guest appearances
- Richard Erdman as Leonard; Jerry Minor as Jerry the Janitor; Eddie Pepitone as Crazy Schmidt

Episode chronology
← Previous "Intro to Knots"	Next → "Heroic Origins"
- Community season 4

"Basic Human Anatomy" is the 11th episode of the fourth season and 82nd overall episode of the NBC sitcom Community, which originally aired on April 25, 2013.

In this episode, Troy and Abed switch bodies—an homage to Freaky Friday—while the valedictorian race between Annie and Shirley sees the pair team up to take down Leonard who is currently #1 in the class.

The episode was written by Jim Rash, and directed by Beth McCarthy-Miller.

== Plot ==
The group has to creatively present any moment from history as part of their final history project; Annie (Alison Brie) proposes a series of banners. Jeff (Joel McHale) only cares about getting a "passable" grade, but Annie and Shirley (Yvette Nicole Brown) are both vying for the valedictorian spot and want the group to aim for an A .

Shirley asks Troy (Donald Glover) and Britta (Gillian Jacobs) what they are going to do for the first anniversary of their first date; they both pretend to not have forgotten the date. Troy, however, happily remembers it as being the third anniversary of him and Abed (Danny Pudi) watching the original Freaky Friday for the first time, which he presents to Abed as a DVD. As Abed thanks Troy for the gift, they reenact the wishing and body switching scene from the film. As the pair spin around and fall to the floor, a Greendale technician (Craig Michaelson) flickers the lights, explaining it is a "routine light switch check." Troy and Abed are disappointed the change did not work.

The next morning, Troy (as Abed) wakes up next to Britta, who wishes him a happy anniversary. Troy quickly wakes Abed (as Troy) up and tells him a body switch occurred after all. They try to convince the rest of the study group that they really swapped bodies and determine that Abed (as Troy) will have to go to with Britta for their anniversary dinner. Troy (as Abed) tells the group the pair will need to recreate the exact scene from yesterday to switch back, but the DVD has gone missing.

Jeff asks Dean Pelton (Jim Rash) to give a Freaky Friday DVD to Troy and Abed, pretending it's not a new copy Jeff bought instead. When the dean asks Jeff how Troy and Abed switched bodies, he grabs onto the DVD and convulses while the same technician flickers the lights, again citing a routine light switch check. The dean starts acting like Jeff.

Annie and Shirley visit the dean in order to find out why Leonard (Richard Erdman) is ranked #1 in the class. The dean at first refuses, but then to continue to act like Jeff reveals that Leonard once took a class in 1968 in Rotary Phone Maintenance and has been taking every subsequent class pass/fail in order to maintain a perfect GPA. When they confront Leonard, he runs out of the college, thereby returning Shirley and Annie to #1 and #2 in the class respectively. Annie is attracted to the Dean while he is acting like Jeff but cannot understand why. Shirley's solidarity with Annie dissolves as soon as she gets the #1 ranking and she gloats, annoying Annie.

Over their dinner, Abed (as Troy) tells Britta that he has been talking to Abed about their relationship, and that Troy is concerned and wonders if they both are truly invested in the relationship or simply going through the motions. Back at Greendale, Jeff insists Troy (as Abed) go find the DVD after he rejects the new copy, as it is actually of the 2003 remake. The janitors, who are having a murder mystery night during the day, direct them to Lost and Found. While looking for the DVD, Troy (as Abed) confesses to Jeff that Troy doesn't think his relationship with Britta is working and that they should break up. Back at the restaurant Abed (as Troy) is confessing the same thoughts to Britta. Jeff commends Troy (as Abed) for his commitment to the bodyswap, but tells him that Troy has to be honest with Britta because "that's what a man does."

Troy (as Abed) arrives to Abed (as Troy) and Britta's dinner, and they reenact the body switching scene, as Jeff flickers the lights, to drop the act and return to their normal personalities. Troy finally sits down and breaks up with Britta on his own, saying that though he is not ready to be her boyfriend, he knows he can be a good friend to her and wishes to have at least that. Britta accepts his confession.

When the group returns to the study room, Pierce (Chevy Chase) shocks them by having completed the banners for their history assignment within 25 minutes.

In the end tag, Troy and Abed perform out-takes with the dean, to the annoyance of Jeff, who demands they stop doing the bit as a week has already passed.

== Continuity ==
- Annie and Shirley reference the C+ grade the group received for their history paper in "Intro to Knots".
- Pierce remarks, "someone's making her way around the table" when he finds out Troy and Britta are dating, referencing Jeff and Britta's previous relationship.
- Leonard has been attending Greendale for at least as far back as 1968 and has had rhinoplasty; the Dean has evidence of his original nose.
- Greendale by-laws requires the Dean to grant three wishes to any student he scolds.

== Production ==
The episode was written by cast member Jim Rash, his sole writing credit for the series. It was directed by Beth McCarthy-Miller.

This aired as episode eleven, but was the tenth episode produced.

== Cultural references ==
Troy buys Abed a six-pack of body switching movies which includes Freaky Friday, 13 Going on 30, The Change-Up, 17 Again, 18 Again!, and Vice Versa.

== Reception ==
The episode was seen by approximately 2.33 million viewers.

Emily VanDerWerff of The A.V. Club rated the episode positively with a B+, saying, "[I]t's an episode that takes a potentially insipid and unbelievable premise and finds something strangely heartfelt in it."
