= Advanced Documentary Filmmaking =

- Community episode
- Episode no.: Season 4 Episode 6
- Directed by: Jay Chandrasekhar
- Written by: Hunter Covington
- Production code: 408
- Original air date: March 14, 2013

Guest appearances
- Mike Hagerty as Sully; Erik Charles Nielsen as Garrett

Episode chronology
← Previous "Cooperative Escapism in Familial Relations"	Next → "Economics of Marine Biology"
- Community season 4

"Advanced Documentary Filmmaking" is the 6th episode of the fourth season and 77th overall episode of the NBC sitcom Community, which originally aired on March 14, 2013. The episode was written by Hunter Covington, and directed by Jay Chandrasekhar. In this episode, Abed makes a documentary about Changnesia in order to receive a research grant, with Jeff attempting to prove Chang is faking his disease.

== Plot ==
Dean Craig Pelton (Jim Rash) has ordered Abed to make a documentary for Greendale about Chang in order to secure a $40,000 grant from the MacGuffin Neurological Institute to study Changnesia, though Abed wants to capture all sides of the issue.

Dr. Ken Kedan (Marc Jablon) is studying the rare disease, described as affecting the memory but not the ability to make forced puns. The dean recounts his history with Chang, from his hiring as a Spanish teacher up to the overthrow of his regime. Britta posits that the current Kevin Chang is the real Chang, the power-crazy Benjamin Chang was the alter-ego, and a hit on the head reverted Chang back to Kevin. She is quickly refuted by Dr. Kedan, who asserts that a hit on the head can only cure Chang if a hit on the head is what led to the initial ailment.

Jeff, believing Chang is lying, asks Shirley to help him debunk Changnesia, but finds out that she has hired Chang at her sandwich shop. After being chided by her about second chances, Jeff outwardly complies with the group but continues to secretly undermine the documentary. Britta interviews Shirley - it's revealed that Shirley was dead for three minutes at some point in her life.

Troy and Annie team up and call themselves Partner & Hoolihan, respectively. They, along with their cameraman, Garrett Lambert (Erik Charles Nielsen), interrogate a trout fisherman, Sully Sullivan (Mike Hagerty) who confesses to using Chang as unpaid labour for three months after seeing Chang emerge out of a trout tank. Sully named him Kevin after his dog.

Jeff is reviewing Britta's footage, which Abed says goes on for 12 hours and is mostly garbage. As they fast-forward through the footage they see Chang repeatedly dialing a number and hanging up.

At the presentation in front of the institute, Annie believes Jeff will reveal the human trafficking, but to everyone's surprise, he presents Alessandra Chang (Andrea De Oliveira), Chang's ex-wife. She is the owner of the phone number Chang had been filmed calling and hanging up on. Chang explains that he found the number in the vents but kept on chickening out of calling, provoking Jeff to kiss Alessandra in order to elicit a confession. After seeing the opposition displayed by Jeff, Lorraine (Lisa Long) of the MacGuffin Neurological Institute grants the funds to the college.

Jeff ends up ostracized from the group, but is welcomed back by Chang, who reminds Jeff of his former life and starting anew. The study group, along with the Dean and Chang, watch the completed documentary and after his apology, forgive Jeff.

In the tag, Chang calls someone to report that they bought it, "hook, line and Winger." Chang then throws his phone into a trash can, only to realize that was an idiotic move; he retrieves it before laughing villainously.

== Production ==
During the filming of the episode, Chevy Chase became angry at the racist and bigoted direction his character was heading. While venting his frustrations, he used the slur "nigger"; episode director Jay Chandrasekhar argued that Chase's use of the word was "political," and an attempt to point out how racist his character had become. Regardless, the slur upset cast members, prompting Chase to walk off set. He later returned to film some additional scenes, but later announced on November 21, 2012 that he had left the show.

The episode was written by new series writer and co-producer Hunter Covington, his first writing credit for the series. It was directed by Jay Chandrasekhar, who directed four episodes previously for the series. Although aired as episode six, it was the eighth episode produced. An early scene in the episode shows the "Archie" banner, which isn't actually produced until the following episode.

This is the third "Documentary Filmmaking" episode of the series, following season two's "Intermediate Documentary Filmmaking" and season three's "Documentary Filmmaking: Redux".

== Reception ==
The episode was initially seen by approximately 2.58 million viewers.

It was met with mixed reviews with Emily VanDerWerff of The A.V. Club rating the episode a B, saying, "[...] at every turn, it reminds me that it doesn’t particularly care to [make a fresh start], and that the past makes a warm, if smothering, blanket." Eric Goldman of IGN gave the episode an 8.8, praising Ken Jeong's performance as Chang and that "It was the first episode this season that felt 100% 'natural,' if that’s the right word."
