= Advanced Introduction to Finality =

- Community episode
- Episode no.: Season 4 Episode 13
- Directed by: Tristram Shapeero
- Written by: Megan Ganz
- Production code: 411
- Original air date: May 9, 2013

Guest appearances
- Joe Lo Truglio as Mark; J. P. Manoux as Dopple-deaner; Erik Charles Nielsen as Garrett; Richard Erdman as Leonard; Charley Koontz as Fat Neil; Danielle Kaplowitz as Vicki; David Neher as Todd; Luke Youngblood as Magnitude; Marcy McCusker as Quendra

Episode chronology
← Previous "Heroic Origins"	Next → "Repilot"
- Community season 4

"Advanced Introduction to Finality" is the 13th and final episode of the fourth season and 84th overall episode of the NBC sitcom Community. It originally aired on May 9, 2013.

In this episode, Jeff Winger (Joel McHale) is set to graduate and expects things to go quietly. But when the darkest timeline breaks through, the evil counterparts make things messy.

The episode received mixed reviews and was watched by 3.08 million viewers, attaining an 18-49 rating of 1.3 and rising in ratings from the previous episode.

== Plot ==
Jeff's (Joel McHale) old partner Mark (Joe Lo Truglio) offers him a position at his law firm, arguing Jeff is still a great lawyer. Jeff agrees to consider it.

At Greendale, Jeff applies for graduation in Dean Pelton's (Jim Rash) office with little fanfare, but he eventually agrees to have a proper ceremony. Later, he confesses to Britta (Gillian Jacobs) he is worried about how leaving Greendale will affect the group, particularly Abed (Danny Pudi). He decides to roll a die and watch Abed's reaction, given Abed's fear of other timelines. (Note: As seen in "Remedial Chaos Theory.") However, the die lands on its edge and no number comes up.

Evil Jeff appears at Greendale, seeking to alienate Jeff from the study group and push him toward Mark's offer. Evil Jeff insults Annie (Alison Brie); Annie later encounters Jeff and runs away upset, to Jeff's confusion. Abed meets Evil Jeff and recognizes him as a doppelgänger. Abed is shot with a specialized paintball gun and is sent to the "Darkest Timeline". There, Abed finds Evil Abed, who has become good again and provides his counterpart with supplies to defeat the doppelgängers.

Jeff goes to apologize to Annie but unknowingly meets Evil Annie, who takes the opportunity to steal his phone. Evil Jeff insults the rest of the group. Jeff arrives at his ceremony to find no one there. Evil Annie arrives with Jeff's phone and urges him to call Mark. When Jeff tries to leave, Evil Jeff arrives to stop him, but Chang (Ken Jeong) protects Jeff.

Jeff escapes and explains what has happened to the group. Abed proves Jeff's story by returning with the special paintball guns. The rest of the Evil Study Group arrives in the prime timeline to take on their counterparts but are slowly eliminated. With only Evil Jeff remaining, Abed reveals these events are occurring in Jeff's mind due to his anxieties about graduation. Abed reassures Jeff he has become a better person at Greendale. Jeff shoots Evil Jeff and reverts to the moment before he threw the die. He decides against tossing it.

Jeff's graduation ceremony takes place, and he gives a heartfelt speech to the group. Pierce (Chevy Chase) interrupts the ceremony so he can graduate first. Afterwards, Jeff announces he will decline Mark's offer and search for work at a small firm, allowing him to "help the little guy" and stay close to the group.

== Production ==
The season finale aired as the thirteenth episode, but was the eleventh episode produced. In a Reddit AMA, Megan Ganz explained that, because it was written in “a pinch”, she wishes that she could have gone back and redone the season finale. She wrote, "I wrote it too long (like... 6 minutes too long) and we had to cut a ton out of it in the edit bay. […] Finales are generally terrible, and I am expecting that people will say this one is trying to [sic] hard, because it is."

This is the second "Introduction to Finality" episode of the series, following season three's finale, "Introduction to Finality."

During Jeff's graduation ceremony, "SIX SEASONS AND A MOVIE" is seen written on the chalkboard as the first words of several sentences. The show's production code of #411 is seen in the upper-right corner.

In "Remedial Chaos Theory," Evil Abed made a pact with Evil Troy to go to the real timeline and destroy it.

== Cultural references ==
The clothing worn by the Evil Study Group resembles costumes from the Matrix series, and the final shootout in which Jeff stops the bullet shot by evil Jeff references a similar scene in The Matrix.

The scene in which Evil Jeff first appears in the Dean's office references the scene in the film The Terminator when the titular character is introduced.

== Reception ==
=== Ratings ===
In its original broadcast, the episode was viewed by 3.08 million American viewers, and received an 18-49 rating/share of 1.3/5. It displays a significant rise in viewers and ratings from the previous episode "Heroic Origins." The finale also tied in 18-49 ratings with the third season finale "Introduction to Finality," but beat it in viewers. The show placed third in its timeslot and ninth for the night.

=== Critical reception ===
The episode received mixed reviews from critics. Eric Goldman of IGN rated the episode "good" at 7.6, saying, "as far as being a fun, nostalgia-packed episode, that may be the very last one, it mostly worked." Emily VanDerWerff of The A.V. Club was far more negative, rating the episode a D, described the episode as "repetitive and that Community was, "no longer a show that's capable of much beyond repeating elements it thinks the audience will like over and over again." She named the episode the worst of the season.

Gabrielle Moss of TV Fanatic was positive, saying, "this episode was an excellent tribute to the slow-burn character development of Jeff Winger." Alan Sepinwall of HitFix was less favorable, he called the plot of the episode a mess, but noted that the ending was sweet.
