= Celebrity Pharmacology =

- Community episode
- Episode no.: Season 2 Episode 13
- Directed by: Fred Goss
- Written by: Hilary Winston
- Production code: 212
- Original air date: January 27, 2011

Guest appearances
- Jim Rash as Dean Craig Pelton; Justin Marco as Marcus; Joel McKinnon Miller as Store Announcer; Erik Charles Nielsen as Garrett; Max Charles as Young Pierce; Joe Fria as Young Cornelius

Episode chronology
← Previous "Asian Population Studies"	Next → "Advanced Dungeons & Dragons"
- Community season 2

"Celebrity Pharmacology" (Note: Also known as "Celebrity Pharmacology 212".) is the thirteenth episode of the second season of the American comedy television series Community, and the 38th episode of the series overall. It aired in the United States on NBC on January 27, 2011. In the episode, the group stages a play to discourage drug use, but Pierce's attempts to give himself a larger role derail the performance.

== Plot ==
The study group is putting on an anti-drug play for a group of middle school students at Annie's (Alison Brie) behest. The other group members complain about their parts, particularly Pierce (Chevy Chase), who is dressed as marijuana and playing the role of "Drugs". After their rehearsal, Chang (Ken Jeong) tries talking to Shirley (Yvette Nicole Brown) about her pregnancy and the possibility he could be the baby's father, but she pointedly ignores him. Britta (Gillian Jacobs) receives multiple texts from someone named Marcus; when she leaves, Jeff (Joel McHale) uses her phone to text Marcus flirtatiously.

Pierce notices Annie collecting cans to recycle and follows her to her apartment. There, she explains she's trying to make money after being cut off by her parents in response to her past problems with drugs. Pierce writes Annie a check to help her pay rent, which she reluctantly accepts. Annie then agrees to let Pierce use a line he improvised for the play. In private, Pierce watches old Hawthorne Wipes commercials, where his father Cornelius replaced him with a new actor to be his "son".

The next day, Pierce arrives with new scripts; when Annie resists, he hints at the check he wrote, so she allows the changes. Britta tells Jeff that Marcus is her nephew who will be attending the play. Jeff tries to talk Marcus down via texts, but Marcus responds with more flirting. When the play starts, Pierce's improvisation greatly amuses the children. Despite Annie's worries that the play's message is getting lost, Pierce returns to the stage after having been "flushed", to the audience's delight. In response, Annie fires Pierce. Pierce lets slip that he wrote Annie a check, and the rest of the group are angry with her for selling out on her own play.

Dean Pelton (Jim Rash) tells the group the students are restless and want to see "Drugs" again. Jeff convinces the group to salvage the play, and Chang volunteers to be "Drugs". He delivers a performance intended to terrify the students; they respond by angrily pelting him with baseballs. Dean Pelton compliments Annie for her play, and Shirley apologizes to Chang for her earlier behavior. Jeff talks to Marcus (Justin Marco) in person and explains the situation; Marcus agrees to not tell Britta what happened "for a price" (implied to be Jeff stealing Britta's bra). Annie tells Pierce she won't take his money, as she does not want to be dependent on others; she assures him they are still friends.

== Reception ==
=== Ratings ===
This episode received 4.585 million viewers and a 2.2/6 rating in the 18-49 demographic.

=== Reviews ===
The episode received mixed to positive reviews. Emily VanDerWerff of The A.V. Club gave the episode a B, noting that the episode felt "sort of cliché" with many ideas that were "undercooked and over-obvious." However, she liked the character dynamics in the episode, particularly Pierce and his struggle for attention, and complemented the two subplots in the episode. Alan Sepinwall of Uproxx remarked that the episode "felt very meta", with Pierce behaving similarly to Chevy Chase and his attempts to get attention in real life. He also commented that the revelations about Annie were "a nice way to push her character into adulthood" and that while "Pierce wasn’t really redeemed, his behavior gave the writers an opportunity to redeem Chang a bit".

In his review, Joshua Kurp of Vulture likened Pierce to Michael Scott, with both characters wanting to be loved and willing to "do just about anything to be cheered on". He called Jeff's subplot "a little too convenient" but enjoyed the scene where he asks Abed (Danny Pudi) for advice while Abed stares back silently. Emma Matthews of Den of Geek praised the episode for being "beautifully written" and "a pitch perfect recreation of hundreds of after school specials, but with sincerity and more than a little heart". She drew attention to Ken Jeong's performance and called the insight into Pierce's backstory "incredibly telling."
