= Gene Hong =

American writer and producer

- Born: Pittsburgh, Pennsylvania, US
- Education: Allegheny College
- Occupations: Writer, producer, reality television personality

Gene Hong is an American writer and producer best known for his writing on TV series' Magnum P.I., Lethal Weapon, Bones and Community. As an actor, he may be best known for being in the original cast of MTV's Nick Cannon Presents Wild 'n Out.

== Early life ==
Hong, a Korean American, graduated from North Allegheny High School in Wexford, Pennsylvania (a suburb of Pittsburgh). He graduated from Allegheny College in Meadville, Pennsylvania.

== Writing and producing career ==
Hong began his career writing sitcoms, serving as a writer/producer for NBC's cult comedy Community, writing the episode "Intro to Felt Surrogacy". His other comedy credits include ABC's The Goode Family, the MTV series DJ and the Fro, Friends with Benefits, and the animated Fox comedy Allen Gregory, created by Jonah Hill. He joined the Fox procedural Bones at the end of season 9, where he served as a writer/producer for three seasons.

Hong has developed and sold seven television pilots, five with Sony Pictures and producer Jamie Tarses, one with 20th Century Fox and Chernin Entertainment for NBC where Hong served as writer, and executive produced along with Maroon 5's Adam Levine and Jake Kasdan., and one for Fox with Bones creator Hart Hanson.

Hong wrote and produced a tennis dramedy feature film, Break Point, about doubles tennis, which was released in July 2015, produced by Broad Green Pictures. The film stars Jeremy Sisto, David Walton, J. K. Simmons, and Amy Smart.

== Personal life ==
During an interview with Howard Stern, actor Jake Gyllenhaal referred to Hong as his best friend, claiming he and Levine remain close because they "share a best friend".

Hong is involved in the non-profit organizations Kiva.org, Won By One to Jamaica, and The Linden Center, a group home facility for emotionally disturbed children in Los Angeles, California.
