= Foosball and Nocturnal Vigilantism =

- Community episode
- Episode no.: Season 3 Episode 9
- Directed by: Anthony Russo
- Written by: Chris Kula
- Production code: 309
- Original air date: December 1, 2011

Guest appearances
- Nick Kroll as Juergen; Richard Erdman as Leonard; Craig Cackowski as Officer Cackowski; David Ury as Rick; Erik Charles Nielsen as Garrett

Episode chronology
← Previous "Documentary Filmmaking: Redux"	Next → "Regional Holiday Music"
- Community season 3

"Foosball and Nocturnal Vigilantism" is the ninth episode of the third season of the American television sitcom Community. It originally aired on December 1, 2011, on NBC.

In the episode, Jeff takes foosball lessons from Shirley to take on a group of rowdy students. The game brings back childhood memories for both of them, and they discover a previously unknown connected past. Meanwhile, Annie accidentally breaks Abed's limited-edition The Dark Knight DVD and stages a break-in to their apartment to hide it. Abed suits up as Batman himself to find the purported burglars.

The episode was written by Chris Kula and directed by Anthony Russo. It received positive critical reviews.

== Plot ==
While the group are hanging out in the student lounge on Friday, a group of German students annoys Jeff (Joel McHale) with their rowdiness while playing foosball. He confronts them, and they promise to stop playing if he can score a point on them. He tries but fails, and the German students mock him.

Later in the night, Shirley (Yvette Nicole Brown) encounters Jeff practicing foosball at the student lounge. She impresses him by showing him some moves, and he solicits her training. Although initially reluctant due to the "dark nature" of the game, Shirley agrees to it. They practice the next day, during which Shirley brings out her ultra-competitive streak. The German trio show up again and agree to a game with Jeff and Shirley on Monday with the losers never getting to use the foosball table again.

Over dinner, Shirley recalls an incident from her childhood in which she (then known as "Big Cheddar") trashed a boy (derisively called "Tinkletown") at foosball and made him pee his pants by jabbing him with the foosball bar in the crotch. Jeff reveals that he was Tinkletown and storms out. Later, Shirley asks Jeff to the student lounge to talk. They end up playing a furious, anime-styled game of foosball, releasing their emotions and opening up to each other.

Meanwhile, when Annie (Alison Brie) is cleaning the apartment, she accidentally steps on Abed's (Danny Pudi) limited-edition The Dark Knight DVD, breaking it. She plans to secretly replace it, but Troy (Donald Glover) warns against it, asking her to confess. When Abed returns, Annie stages a break-in, making Abed believe that the DVD was stolen. A policeman arrives at the scene but finds no signs of forced entry and concedes that if stolen the DVD will be impossible to recover. Abed concludes that the break-in was an inside job carried out by the landlord Rick, since Rick has the keys and dressed as the Joker for Halloween.

Abed suits up as Batman and rappels down through the window to Rick's room. Troy and Annie follow him. Abed confronts Rick about a stolen item, to which Rick replies "in the closet." Troy and Annie open Rick's closet and find it full of stolen women's shoes. Annie also plants the broken DVD there, framing Rick for stealing it. The policeman arrives again to sort out the mess. Back at the apartment, Abed, as Batman, forgives Annie for the mishap but warns her not to tell Abed as he won't be so forgiving.

On Monday, Jeff and Shirley face off with the Germans at foosball. However, they perform a trick to make the ball land right in the middle of the foosball table where bar mounted figures can't reach. While the Germans frantically try to kick the ball, Jeff and Shirley simply walk off together. The final scene depicts them walking hand-in-hand as children again, signifying that the feud between them has ended.

The bumper scene depicts one of Leonard's YouTube frozen pizza reviews, which includes a Chuck Lorre-style vanity card.

== Production ==
"Foosball and Nocturnal Vigilantism" was written by Chris Kula, his first writing credit for the series. It was directed by Anthony Russo, his 14th directing credit.

The animation sequence was made by Titmouse, Inc. It was directed by Grif Kimmins, animated by Parker Simmons and produced by Ben Kalina.

Nick Kroll guest-starred as Juergen, the leader of the German foosball group.

The episode was originally titled "Indoor Sports with Christian Bale".

=== Writing ===
The episode featured a rare pairing between Jeff and Shirley for the main storyline. Whereas Britta has developed more into Jeff's conscience, Shirley is the spiritual opposite of Jeff. The Jeff/Shirley storyline is also a television trope where two characters find out that they knew each other as children. This device has been used in television series such as Mad About You, The Simpsons, and Fringe.

In the second storyline, when Annie tries to secretly replace Abed's broken DVD, Troy reminds her: "Do you know how many sitcoms have tried the secretly replace an item thing? Abed does." Abed reprises his impression of Christian Bale as Batman. Annie, usually the voice of reason, undergoes a role reversal as the troublemaker.

== Themes ==
The main storyline shows that while Jeff and Shirley are opposite in many ways, both have morphed into their present personas under very similar circumstances. When they were children, Shirley was a mean foosball player; Jeff used the game to fill his loneliness and inability to connect with people. Shirley behaves as a pious woman to erase memories of her past as a bully, while Jeff's too-cool-to-care attitude developed after being a victim of bullying during his childhood. Despite Shirley feeling bad about bullying Jeff and his bitterness about it, the episode demonstrates that the process of growing up is often about giving up on painful experiences and realizing an ability to rise above them with the help of friends and family.

Meanwhile, in the second storyline, Abed initially used the Batman persona as a way to deal with a painful situation. In the end, he, Troy and Annie resolve the situation maturely and take a collective leap into adulthood.

== Reception ==
=== Ratings ===
In its original American broadcast on December 1, 2011, the episode was viewed by approximately 3.74 million people, with a Nielsen rating/share of 1.7/5 in the 18–49 demographic.

=== Reviews ===
"Foosball and Nocturnal Vigilantism" received generally positive reviews from critics. Nick Kroll's guest appearance drew near universal acclaim.

Alan Sepinwall of HitFix said the Jeff/Shirley storyline "wound up being much more successful than the [Annie/Abed storyline]... in rare combinations like we got tonight, we can see that Joel McHale and Yvette Nicole Brown work very well together." As for the Annie/Abed storyline, he said "it didn't seem much different, or better, than the many, many, many other sitcoms that have done the 'secretly replace a priceless broken item' thing before it. Not unfunny, but a whole lot flimsier than what 'Community' is capable of so much of the time."

Ology's Emily Cheever said "'Foosball And Nocturnal Vigilantism' was one of the best episodes of Community, nay television, I've ever seen... Community has the reputation that it's hard to get new viewers due to its irreverence and self-referential humor. It's hard to always appreciate the benefits of Community when you don't know what's going on. But this episode filled my living room with belly laughs from start to finish." Kelsea Stahler of Hollywood.com said the episode was "simple and sweet... Tonight’s episode shows that while Community is certainly adept at going off the wall, when you take away the crazy ideas, it still retains a base of genuine humor and solid, emotional human relationships."

Emily VanDerWerff of The A.V. Club gave the episode an 'A−', saying "Community has always been known as a clever show, and that’s because what the show throws at you upfront is that cool cleverness, that sense that it’s just too awesome for words. But when you start to dig down a bit, you see that what it also is achingly sincere." Leigh Raines of TV Fanatic gave "Foosball" a 4.5/5 rating, saying it was "full of love and awesome quotes." Robert Canning of IGN said "[Community] clearly has the feel of an already great series truly hitting its stride. Fingers crossed that NBC has been watching these episodes and is starting to think the same thing."
