= Maggie Bandur =

American television writer and producer

- Born: February 8, 1974 (age 52); Los Angeles, California, U.S.
- Occupations: Television producer and writer
- Years active: 2000-present

Maggie Bandur (born February 8, 1974) is an American television writer and television producer.

== Biography ==
In 1992, as a student at El Camino Real High School in Los Angeles, Bandur took part in the United States Academic Decathlon. El Camino Real's team finished fourth.

Bandur was a contestant in the 1994 Jeopardy! College Championship, representing Northwestern University and later was part of the questions in the game.

Bandur is known for her experience in comedy writing. After her first work with Malcolm in the Middle she has written series for Fox, ABC, CBS, the CW and BBC3. With decline of the demand on sitcoms she took various "branching out" jobs, including 6 months in England working on an episode of Clone. Upon return from England she wrote for My Boys and short comedy plays (Tea & Sorcery, More White Meat). She currently works on NBC's Community.

== Filmography ==
- Co-executive producer
  - Community (1 episode)
- Co-executive producer
  - Love, Inc.
  - Life on a Stick
- Producer (2003) for Malcolm in the Middle.
- Writer
  - Life is Wild (1 episode)
  - Big Day (2 episodes)
  - Love, Inc. (3 episodes)
  - Malcolm in the Middle (13 episodes)
  - Big Wolf on Campus (1 episode)
  - Life on a Stick (2 episodes)
  - Clone (episode 6)
  - My Boys, (4 episodes)
  - ’’Community’’ (3 episodes)
  - ’’The Michael J. Fox Show’’ (2 episodes)
  - ’’Galavant’’ (Season 2, Episode 4: “Bewitched, Bothered, And Belittled”)
  - ‘’Mary + Jane’’ (2 episodes)
  - ’’Powerless’’ (Season 1, Episode 10: “No Consequence Day”)
  - ’’Deadly Class’’ (Season 1, Episode 6: “Stigmata Martyr”)
