= Tristram Shapeero =

English television director and producer

- Born: Somerset, England
- Occupations: Director; producer
- Years active: 1989–present

Tristram Shapeero is an English television director and producer who has worked on both British and American comedy series.

== Early life ==
Shapeero was born in Somerset and spent his childhood in Bath, where he attended St. Stephen's School and Beechen Cliff School.

== Career ==
Shapeero started his career as a show runner on Channel 4's Norbert Smith: A Life and then worked on Whose Line Is It Anyway? He went to New York in 1991 to direct a few television comedy episodes. After moving back to the UK, he continued to direct television comedy, such as all episodes of Pulling, half of the episodes of Green Wing, and two series of Peep Show. He also directed episodes of Brass Eye, I'm Alan Partridge, and Absolutely Fabulous. He has been nominated for a BAFTA eight times: Gimme Gimme Gimme and Brass Eye Special (two nominations) in 2002, Bremner, Bird and Fortune in 2003, Green Wing in 2005 and 2007, Peep Show in 2006, and Pulling in 2007.

Shapeero relocated to Los Angeles in 2009 to direct American television. He first directed an episode of Parks and Recreation, and later was a producer of Community for two seasons in addition to directing 24 episodes of the show. He has also directed episodes of Veep, Brooklyn Nine-Nine, Unbreakable Kimmy Schmidt, I Feel Bad, Trophy Wife, The Grinder, Benched, and Pivoting.

Shapeero's first feature film as director, A Merry Friggin' Christmas starring Robin Williams, was released in 2014 to negative reviews.

== Personal life ==
Shapeero lives in Los Angeles with his American wife, Erica, whom he met in New York City in 1991.

Shapeero received an honorary Doctor of Letters from Bath Spa University in 2010.

In November 2020, Shapeero attracted controversy when he forgot to mute his microphone while hosting an online audition on Zoom, and was heard making disparaging comments about American actor Lukas Gage's apartment; while talking to someone else about Gage, he mentioned that "these poor people live in these tiny apartments". Gage laughed and jokingly replied, "I know it's a shitty apartment. [...] Give me this job so I can get a better one." Shapeero began apologising profusely and said he was "mortified". Gage later posted the video on Twitter, where it went viral and prompted figures such as Judd Apatow and January Jones to defend him. Shapeero later apologised again, stating that his use of "poor" was not remarking on Gage's finances but rather indicating that Gage deserved sympathy.

== Filmography ==
- Los Dos Bros (1999–2001)
- Smack the Pony (2000)
- Gimme Gimme Gimme (2001)
- Brass Eye Special (2001)
- I'm Alan Partridge (2001)
- Bremner, Bird And Fortune (2001)
- Absolutely Fabulous (2002)
- French & Saunders (2002)
- Peep Show (2004–2005)
- Green Wing (2004–2007)
- Absolute Power (2005)
- Feel the Force (2006)
- Ruddy Hell! It's Harry and Paul (2008)
- Pulling (2006–2009)
- Sidney Turtlebaum (2008)
- Reggie Perrin (2009)
- The Persuasionists (2010)
- Parks and Recreation (2010–2013, 4 episodes)
- Community (24 episodes)
- Bored to Death (2010–2011)
- Happy Endings (2011–2013)
- Nurse Jackie (2011)
- Workaholics (2011–2012)
- Childrens Hospital (2011–2012)
- New Girl (2012–2013)
- Big Bad World (2013)
- A Merry Friggin' Christmas (2014)
- Brooklyn Nine-Nine (2014–2016)
- Unbreakable Kimmy Schmidt (2015-2017)
- Blunt Talk (2015–2016)
- GLOW (2017)
- Turn Up Charlie (2019)
- Four Weddings and a Funeral (2019)
- Never Have I Ever (2020)
- Mr. Mayor (2021)
- Acapulco (2021)
- Pivoting (2022)
- Dinner with the Parents (2024)
- The Z-Suite (2025)
- St. Denis Medical (2025)
