= List of Community characters =

Community is an American television sitcom created by Dan Harmon that ran for 110 episodes. The show, set at the fictional Greendale Community College, depicts the on-campus exploits of a close-knit study group. In the pilot, the main cast members are Joel McHale, Gillian Jacobs, Danny Pudi, Yvette Nicole Brown, Alison Brie, Donald Glover, and Chevy Chase. Ken Jeong joined the main cast starting with the second episode, and Jim Rash was promoted to the main cast at the start of the third season. John Oliver, Jonathan Banks, Paget Brewster, and Keith David also played major roles throughout their stints while not actually being credited among the main cast. The series also features recurring characters, mainly fellow students or teachers at Greendale.

== Overview ==
=== Main ===
Actor	Character	Seasons						Film
Actor	Character	1	2	3	4	5	6	Film
Main cast
Joel McHale	Jeff Winger	Main	Main	Main	Main	Main	Main	Main
Gillian Jacobs	Britta Perry	Main	Main	Main	Main	Main	Main	Main
Danny Pudi	Abed Nadir	Main	Main	Main	Main	Main	Main	Main
Alison Brie	Annie Edison	Main	Main	Main	Main	Main	Main	Main
Yvette Nicole Brown	Shirley Bennett	Main	Main	Main	Main	Main	Guest	Main
Donald Glover	Troy Barnes	Main (Note: Glover appears through 5x5)	Main	Main	Main	Main	Stand-in	Main
Chevy Chase	Pierce Hawthorne	Main	Main	Main	Main	Guest		
Ken Jeong	Ben Chang	Main	Main	Main	Main	Main	Main	Main
Jim Rash	Dean Craig Pelton	Recurring	Recurring	Main	Main	Main	Main	Main

=== Recurring ===
Actor	Character	Seasons						Film
Actor	Character	1	2	3	4	5	6	Film
Recurring cast
John Oliver	Dr. Ian Duncan	Recurring	Recurring			Recurring		
Richard Erdman	Leonard Briggs	Recurring	Recurring	Recurring	Recurring	Recurring	Recurring	
Erik Charles Nielsen	Garrett Lambert	Recurring	Recurring	Recurring	Recurring	Recurring	Recurring	
Dino Stamatopoulos	Alex "Star-Burns" Osbourne	Recurring	Recurring	Recurring		Recurring	Guest	
Craig Cackowski	Officer Cackowski	Recurring	Recurring	Recurring			Recurring	
Lauren Stamile	Professor Michelle Slater	Recurring						
Eric Christian Olsen	Vaughn Miller	Recurring						
John Michael Higgins	Professor Eustice Whitman	Recurring						
Iqbal Theba	Gobi Nadir	Recurring			Guest			
Dominik Musiol	Pavel Iwaszkiewicz	Recurring	Recurring	Guest		Guest		
Patton Oswalt	Nurse Jackie	Guest	Guest					
Bill Parks	Eric Wisniewski	Recurring	Recurring					
DC Pierson	Mark Millot	Recurring	Recurring	Guest				
Meggie McFadden	Linda Greene	Recurring	Guest	Guest				
Greg Cromer	Rich Stephenson	Guest	Recurring					
Danielle Kaplowitz	Vicki Cooper		Recurring	Recurring	Recurring	Recurring	Recurring	
Charley Koontz	"Fat" Neil		Recurring	Recurring	Recurring	Recurring	Guest	
Luke Youngblood	Magnitude		Recurring	Recurring	Recurring	Recurring	Guest	
Marcy McCusker	Quendra		Recurring	Guest	Recurring			
Jordan Black	City College Dean Spreck		Recurring	Guest	Guest			
Malcolm-Jamal Warner	Andre Bennett		Recurring	Guest				
Rob Corddry	Alan Connor		Guest	Guest		Guest		
Betty White	June Bauer		Recurring					
Andy Dick	Helicopter Pilot/Tiny Man		Recurring					
Kevin Corrigan	Professor Sean Garrity		Recurring			Guest		
LeVar Burton			Guest			Guest		
John Goodman	Vice Dean Robert Laybourne			Recurring				
Dan Bakkedahl	Murray the AC Repairman			Recurring				
Travis Schuldt	Rick			Guest			Guest	
J. P. Manoux	Faux-by/Dopple-deaner			Recurring	Guest (Note: J.P. Manoux appeared in the season 4 episode "Advanced Introduction to Finality". as Dean Pelton's darkest timeline counterpart, Dopple-deaner.)			
David St. James	Professor Albrecht			Guest			Guest	
Mel Rodriguez	Sgt. Nunez			Recurring				
Michael K. Williams	Dr. Marshall Kane			Recurring				
Wil Garret	Harry Jefferson			Recurring				
Irene Choi	Annie Kim			Guest	Guest		Guest	
Jerry Minor	Jerry the Janitor	Guest	Guest	Recurring	Guest	Guest		
Eddie Pepitone	Crazy Schmidt			Recurring		Guest		
David Neher	Todd Jacobson			Recurring	Recurring		Recurring	
Larry Cedar	Cornelius Hawthorne			Recurring				
Malcolm McDowell	Professor Cornwallis				Recurring			
Brie Larson	Rachel				Guest	Recurring		
Brady Novak	Richie Countee		Guest	Recurring	Guest	Recurring	Guest	
Jeremy Scott Johnson	Carl Bladt			Recurring	Guest	Recurring	Guest	
Leslie Simms	Rhonda					Recurring	Recurring	
Jonathan Banks	Professor Buzz Hickey					Recurring		
James Michael Connor	Subway Rep					Recurring		
Darsan Solomon	Dave					Guest	Recurring	
Paget Brewster	Frankie Dart					Guest (Note: Paget Brewster previously appeared in the season 5 episode "Analysis of Cork-Based Networking" as a different character, Debra Chambers.)	Recurring	
Keith David	Elroy Patashnik			Guest (Note: Keith David previously narrated the season 3 episode "Pillows and Blankets".)			Recurring	
Martin Mull	George Perry						Recurring	
Lesley Ann Warren	Deb Perry						Recurring	

== Main characters ==
The show revolves around the on-and-off campus exploits of seven students connected through their study group at Greendale Community College.

=== Jeff Winger ===
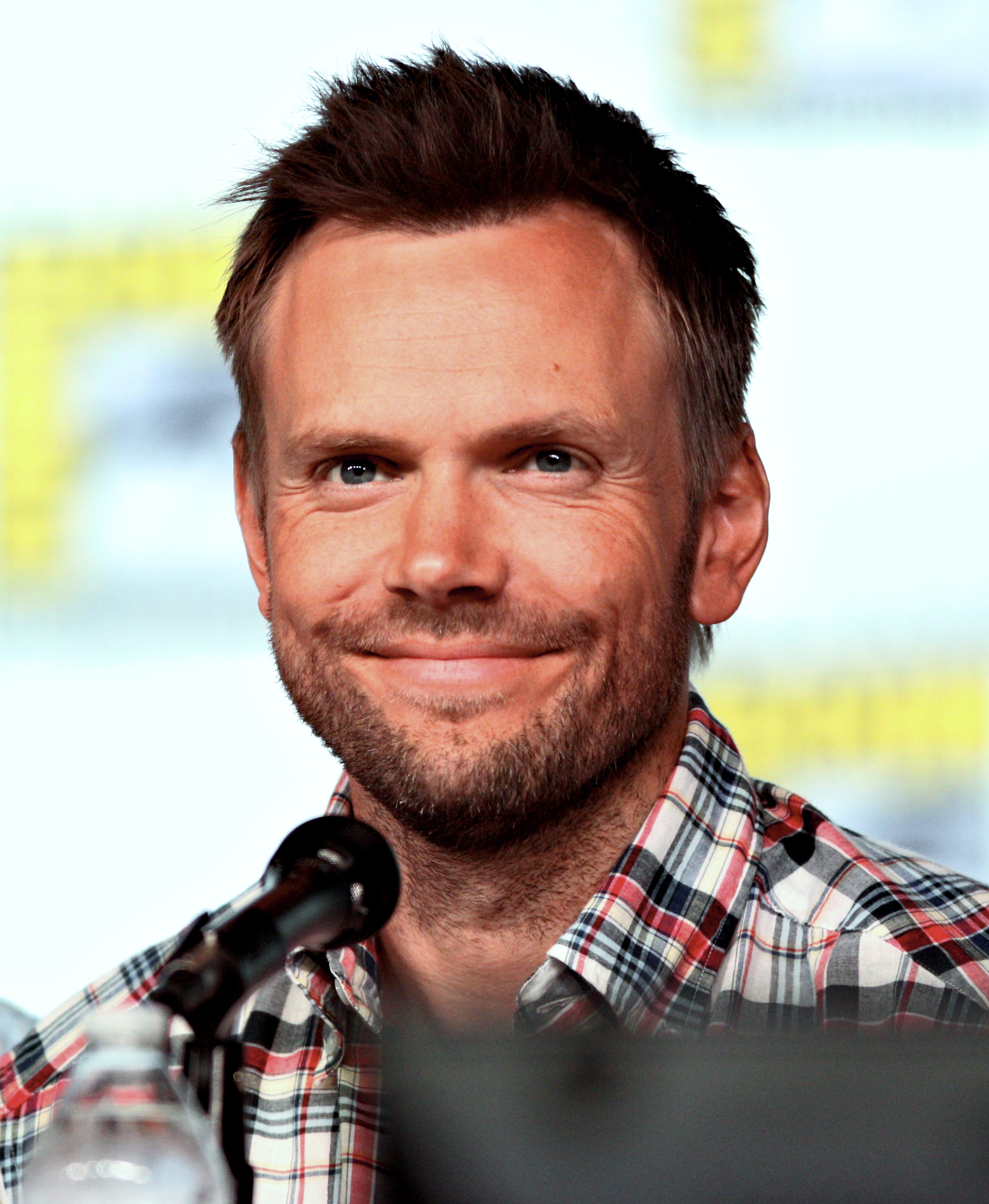
Joel McHale

Jeffrey Tobias Winger (played by Joel McHale), born c. 1974, is a sardonic, charismatic, and quick-witted ex-lawyer attending Greendale Community College. He was born in Denver, Colorado, to parents William and Doreen Winger. His father divorced his mother when Jeff was very young and later had another child named Willy Jr., Jeff's half-brother. At the age of 10, he was bullied and humiliated in front of his friends at a YMCA over a game of foosball, eventually wetting his pants. Unbeknownst to either of them at the time, the girl who beat him was his study-group peer Shirley, who was then 12 and a bully. He tells her that he had to change schools, as well as his hair, his clothes, even his personality because of the incident. In 1997, around age 19, Jeff submitted an audition tape for MTV's The Real World: Seattle, which would later come back to haunt him during an election for Greendale's student-body president. In the season 5 episode "Geothermal Escapism", as study-group member Troy is about to leave Greendale, Jeff discreetly reveals to him that he has "never set one foot outside Colorado".

Because of his background experience as a lawyer and his confidence, many people, including Dean Pelton and Señor Chang, seek help from Jeff. Jeff's adventures include stints as a member of the debate team and substitute glee club, and editor of the school newspaper, as well as efforts to improve Chang's professional and love lives. Due to his competitive nature and air of superiority, Jeff has a problematic relationship with his accounting, billiards, and pottery professors, and he ends up doing poorly in their classes.

=== Britta Perry ===
Britta Perry
- Community character
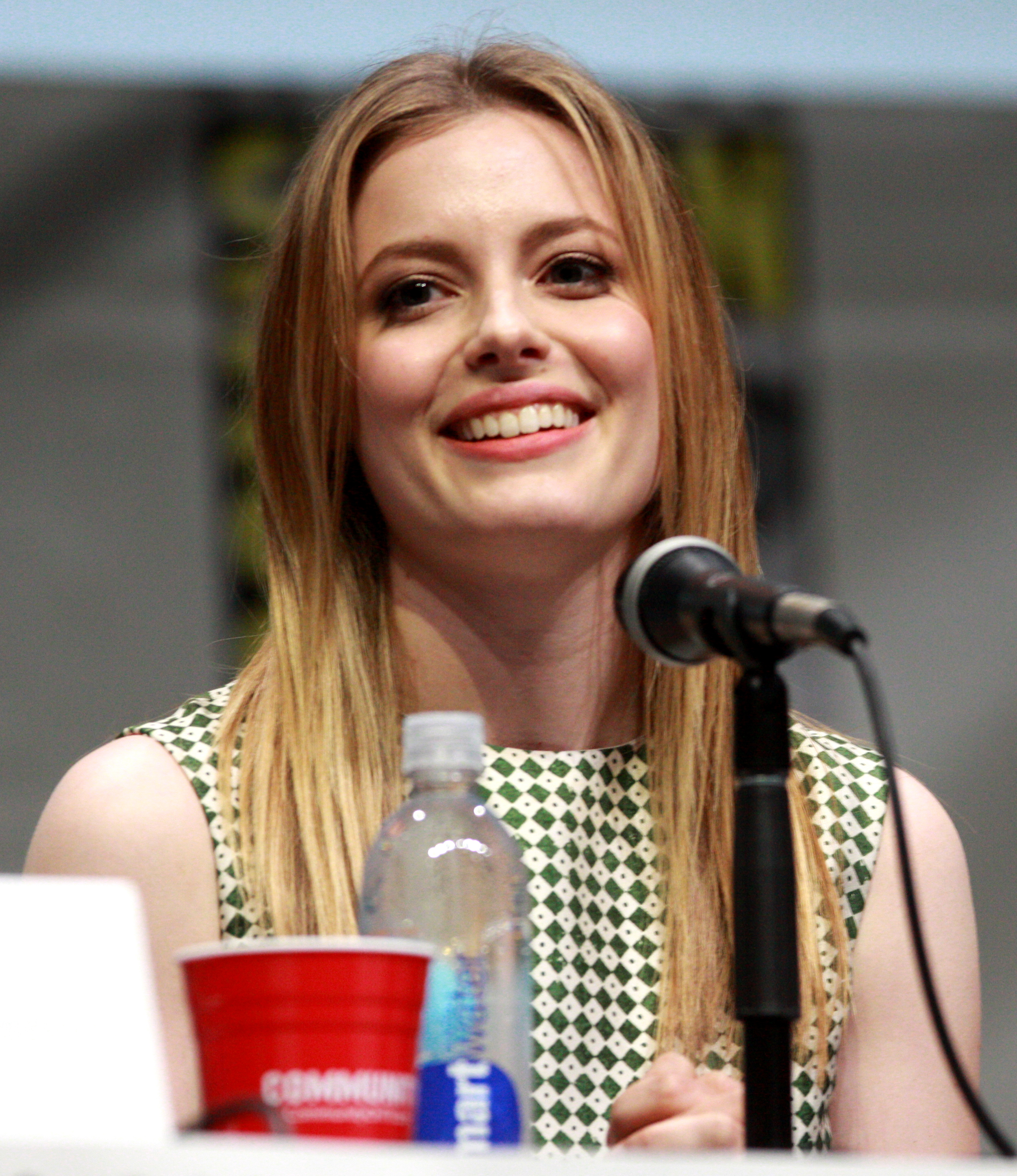
- First appearance: "Pilot" (2009)
- Created by: Dan Harmon
- Portrayed by: Gillian Jacobs

In-universe information
- Occupation: Student at Greendale Community College; Bartender; Waiter (Former); Manager at Shirley's Sandwiches
- Family: George Perry (father); Deb Perry (mother); Unnamed brother; Unnamed second brother
- Significant others: Blade (ex-boyfriend); Vaughn Miller (ex-boyfriend); Jeff Winger (ex-fiancé); Troy Barnes (ex-boyfriend); Rick (ex-boyfriend)
- Relatives: Marcus (nephew)

Britta Perry (played by Gillian Jacobs) is a student at Greendale and a member of the central study group. Politically conscious and driven by a strong moral conscience, Britta's sensibilities often put her at odds with the rest of the group as well as other students at Greendale, who see her as a "buzzkill." Having dropped out of high school under the impression that it would impress Radiohead, she attends Greendale to get her G.E.D and eventually opts to study Psychology in order to become a therapist. Britta moves away from her childhood home and cuts off contact with her overbearing parents when she is 17, later reuniting with them after discovering they had a change of heart and have secretly been sending her money through Annie, Abed and Jeff.

Britta joins the study group in order to improve her Spanish grade, though she quickly realizes that Jeff has only created the group in order to sleep with her. Though she initially rebuffs his advances, the two have sex toward the end of the school year ("Modern Warfare"). Britta, in an attempt to compete with Jeff's affections for Professor Michelle Slater (played by Lauren Stamile), publicly confesses her love for Jeff. Though she is humiliated by this, she finds that she has attracted the attention and respect of many women on campus who hail her for her bravery. Jeff and Britta continue sleeping together covertly during their second year, up until Abed reveals their relations to the group. In season 4, Britta enters a relationship with Troy, though Troy initiates their breakup on their first anniversary and Britta is left saddened but also stays friends with Troy afterwards.

While vocally passionate about many causes, Britta fails to take action related to her social interests, and her political efforts run a gamut from sincere but ineffectual to counterproductive and embarrassing. Jeff describes her as "pro-anti" due to her eagerness to oppose issues, such as marriage and visiting the bathroom with other women. Her hypocrisy and tendency to invoke politics regardless of relevance, such as advocating for fictional gnomes' rights in Dungeons & Dragons, frequently frustrates both friends and strangers, to the point that others regularly refer to her as "the worst." The S2 episode "Critical Film Studies" heaped more humiliation on Britta when the owner of the crummy diner where she was an unsuccessful waitress made sure to let Annie and Shirley know that customers made a point of tipping Britta next to nothing (and Annie's response is to note with little sympathy "everyone hates Britta" to an agreeing Shirley), and he later makes a deal with Jeff to take less money after the group accidentally trashed the diner as long as Britta gets fired (which Jeff has no problem agreeing on).

Britta graduates from Greendale in season 4 and starts bartending, but she re-enrolls in classes in season 5 once Jeff becomes a professor. She joins the Save Greendale Committee and helps prevent the school from being sold to Subway. She moves in with Abed and Annie after Troy leaves them for a year-long trip to earn Pierce's inheritance.

Despite being seen as obnoxious by those around her, Britta regularly proves herself to be a caring friend. She is the first to show concern for Abed when he begins seeing the world in claymation, consoles Abed and attempts to help him when he is upset over Troy's brief stint in the A/C Repair school, and helps Buzz Hickey reconnect with his son over Dungeons & Dragons.

=== Abed Nadir ===
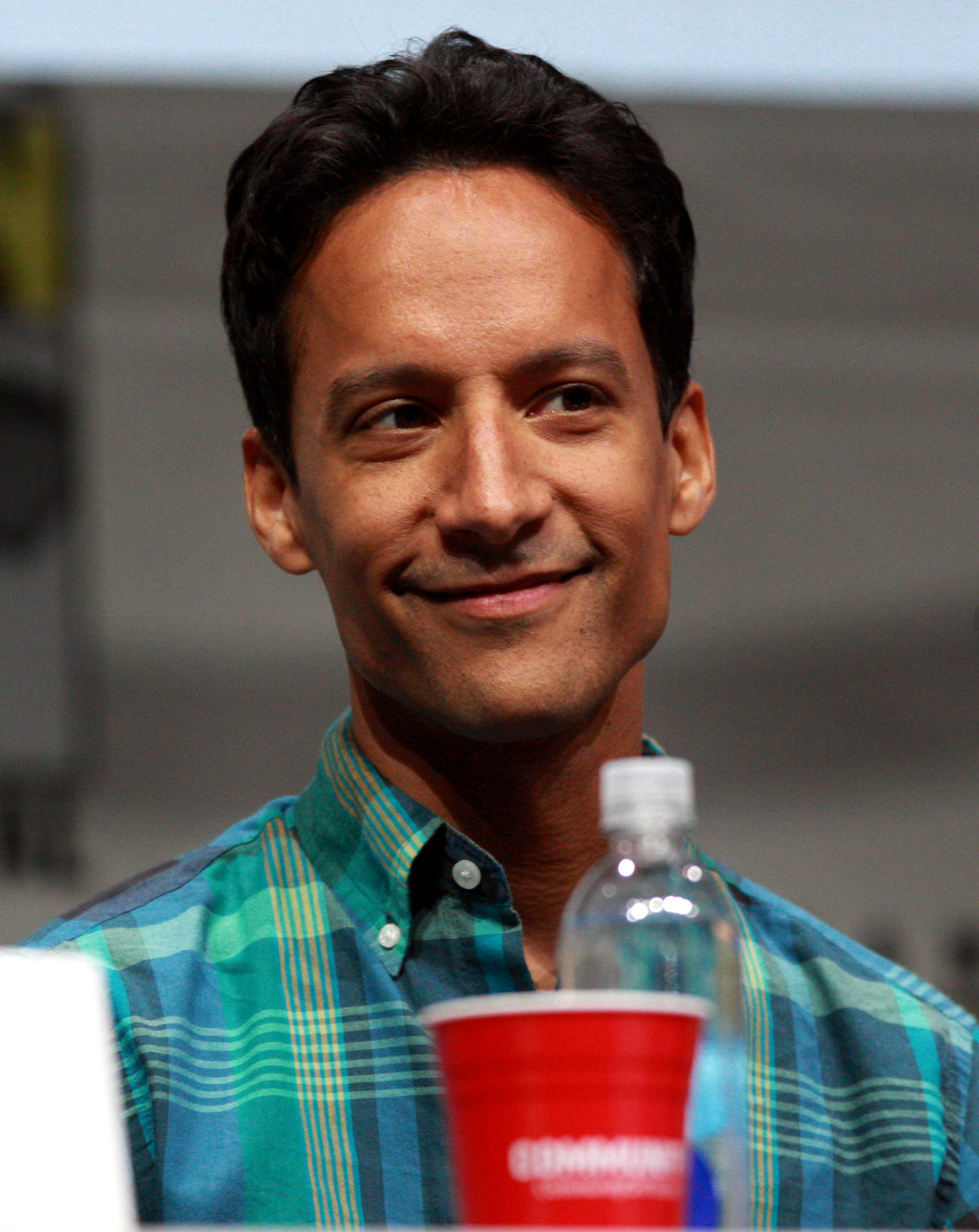
Danny Pudi

Abed Gubi Nadir (Arabic: عابد القوبي نادر Ābid al-Qūbī Nādir; played by Danny Pudi) is a young, emotionally reserved, Palestinian-Polish-American pop-culture enthusiast who aspires to become a director and is currently taking film directing classes at Greendale. Paste ranked him first in their list of the 20 Best Characters of 2011, describing him as "the show's emotional center" and saying "his pop-culture obsessions and antics with his buddy Troy have made for some of the show's finest moments."

Abed Nadir is an alumnus of Greendale Community College. Abed had a troublesome life growing up due to a limited extent to his parents. There was social disunity between them as Abed's father is a Palestinian Muslim from the Gaza Strip and his mother is a Polish American Catholic. Nevertheless, he enjoys observing both Muslim and Christian holidays and traditions. Abed is heavily implied to be neurodivergent, which makes it hard for him to understand and relate to people or display empathy in a normal way, although his condition is never specified.

=== Shirley Bennett ===
Shirley Bennett
- Community character
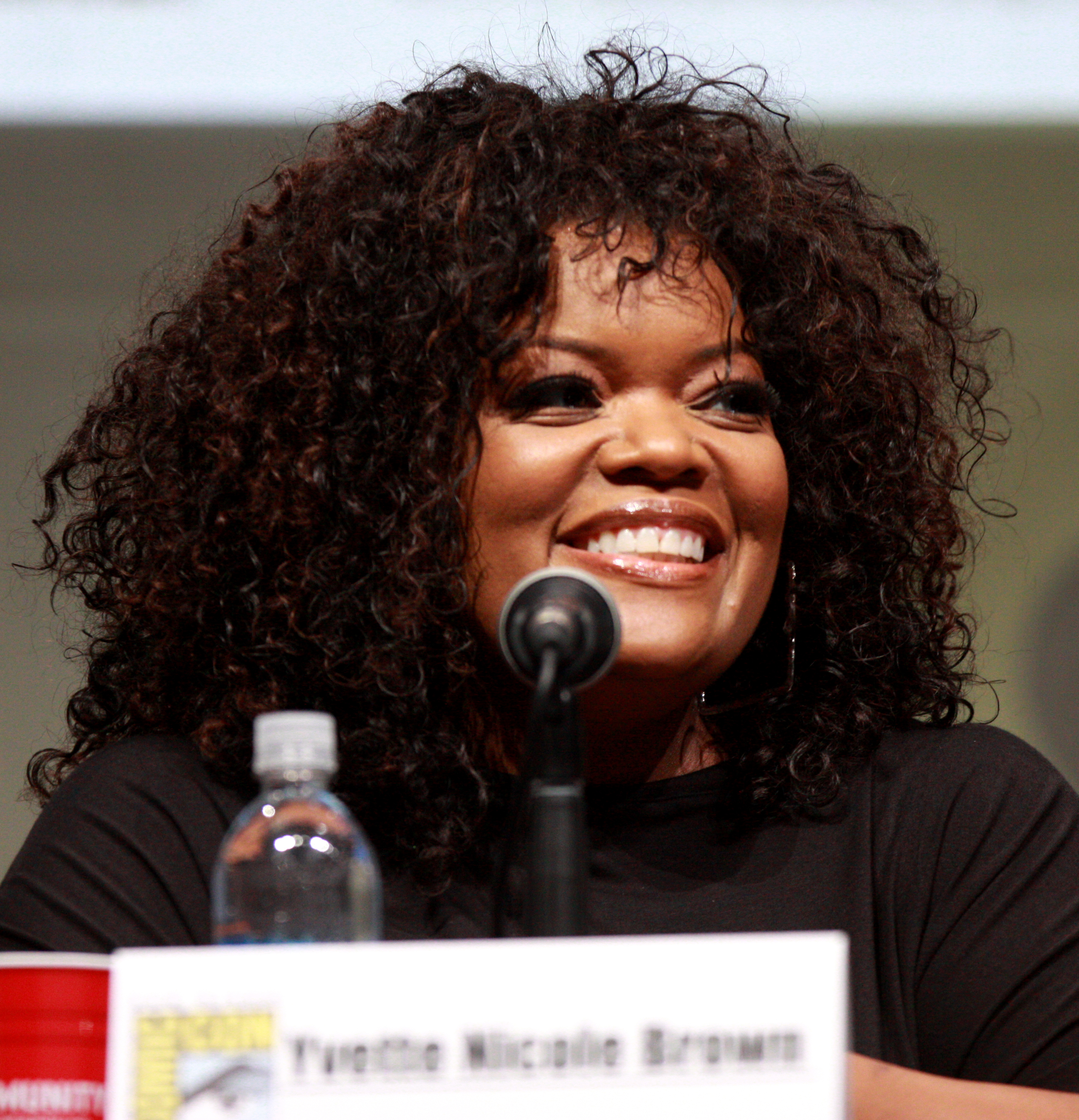
- First appearance: "Pilot" (2009)
- Created by: Dan Harmon
- Portrayed by: Yvette Nicole Brown

In-universe information
- Full name: Shirley Bennett (née Edwards)
- Occupation: Student at Greendale Community College; Owner of Shirley's Sandwiches; Personal Cook for Mister Butcher
- Spouse: Andre Bennett (ex-husband)
- Children: Elijah Bennett (son); Jordan Bennett (son); Ben Bennett (son)

Shirley Anne Bennett, (née Edwards, played by Yvette Nicole Brown), (main cast seasons 1–5, guest season 6) is a recently divorced mother who attends Greendale Community College to pursue launching her own baked goods business. She carries herself in a friendly and motherly manner, but suffers from thinly veiled rage issues and is implied to have an alcoholic past. She admits in Season 2 that she deliberately makes other people feel guilty for not letting her have her way all the time, but makes it clear she's also not going to stop being either demanding or hypocritical.

A devout Christian, Shirley's intolerance for her friends' religions (or lack thereof) often puts her at odds with the rest of the study group. She attempts to baptize Annie (who is Jewish) at a pool party and suggests doing the same to Abed (who is Muslim) while he is in a catatonic state. Despite this, she is typically able to set aside religious differences in the interest of maintaining her friendships with the group.

In "Epidemiology", Shirley becomes frustrated with the group for mistaking her Glinda the Good Witch costume as Miss Piggy and has sex with Ben Chang, who is similarly frustrated that his Peggy Fleming costume is mistaken as Kristi Yamaguchi or Michelle Kwan. Soon after, she reconnects with her ex-husband, Andre, and discovers she is pregnant. A message left on Troy's voicemail leads the group to speculate that Chang, not Andre, is the biological father, a possibility that Shirley finds repellant and is determined to avoid acknowledging. The baby is born in "Applied Anthropology and Culinary Arts" during what was supposed to be their Anthropology final exam, and Shirley is relieved to find that it is her husband's baby. She decides to name the baby Ben after Chang, making her son Ben Bennett.

In "Urban Matrimony and the Sandwich Arts", Andre asks Shirley to remarry him. They marry after resolving a small conflict concerning whether Shirley will leave school and become a stay-at-home mother. She stays in school and opens a sandwich shop with Pierce, naming it "Shirley's Sandwich Shop."

In season 5, it is revealed that Andre has once again left Shirley and taken the kids with him due to her devoting too much time and money to her sandwich business. She returns to Greendale to continue pursuing her entrepreneurial dreams, and joins the Save Greendale Committee. In the season six premiere, Shirley leaves for Atlanta in order to care for her ailing father. She eventually becomes the personal chef of a suicidal former detective attempting to solve the mystery behind his wife's death and his paralysis. When the group discusses her absence, Abed claims she was "spun off", and the closing credits feature a mock television advertisement for an NBC police procedural about Shirley and the detective titled The Butcher and the Baker.

=== Annie Edison ===
Annie Edison
- Community character
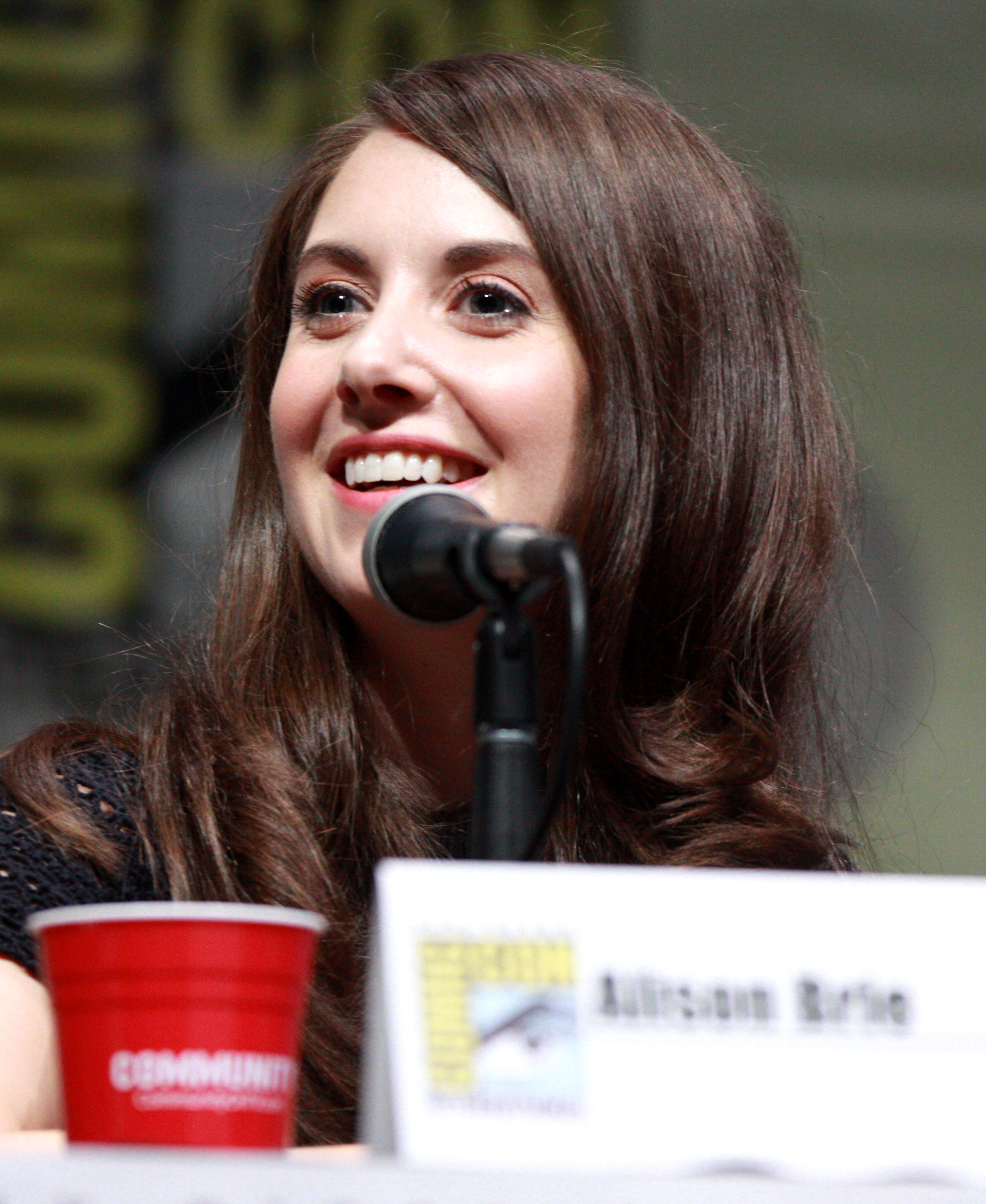
- First appearance: "Pilot" (2009)
- Last appearance: "Emotional Consequences of Broadcast Television" (2015)
- Created by: Dan Harmon
- Portrayed by: Alison Brie

In-universe information
- Full name: Ann Edison
- Alias: Caroline Decker
- Nickname: Annie
- Occupation: Intern at the FBI; Student at Greendale Community College (Former); Pharmaceutical Sales Representative (Former)
- Family: Anthony Edison (brother) Unnamed Mother
- Significant others: Vaughn Miller (ex-boyfriend); Troy Barnes (former love interest, roommate); Abed Nadir (roommate); Richard Stephenson (love interest, rejected); Jeff Winger (love interest)

Annie Edison (played by Alison Brie) is a diligent, strait-laced Type-A student who is in her fifth year at Greendale Community College after graduating and then reapplying to major in her dream, forensic science. Annie is the elder of two children, born to an Episcopalian father and Jewish mother, and she adheres to Judaism. During high school, Annie was a timid, nerdy student who desperately wanted to succeed, subsequently developing an addiction to Adderall. She was an acquaintance of Troy Barnes, a popular athlete, and harbored a crush on him. They both attended a party where high school honors were being awarded. When Troy, instead of Annie, received the award for "Most Likely to Succeed", and when he failed to recognize Annie when she criticized him, she suffered a nervous breakdown that culminated in her jumping through a plate-glass window yelling, "Everyone's a robot!" Her injuries necessitated six separate reconstructive surgeries. Against the wishes of her mother, she chose to confront the addiction and go to rehab. This led to an estrangement from her family, including any financial support, and she currently survives on her savings from her childhood. In season 2, the group learns she is living in a horrible neighborhood (in an apartment situated over Dildopolis, an all-night sex shop), and Troy and Abed invite her to move into their new place in season 3.

While attending rehab, she had an outing to a frozen yogurt restaurant, during which she saw an advertisement for Greendale and decided to participate in the community college. Between her graduation from rehab and her enrollment in Greendale, she shed her geek appearance and began to straighten her hair and dress more fashionably.

Though the youngest of the group, Annie is also by far the most studious and serious. She is, for example, the only student of Greendale to have ever made use of the extra credit program that the college offers by hosting a Dia de los Muertos party. During an episode where she is forced to leave the group due to her sabotaging their Spanish finals, the group learns that she is the only person who knows how to study. She also takes audio notes of every class and transcribes them, prompting Pierce to exclaim and misuse the term "spoiler alert". She is very intensely focused on grades, school activities, and group cohesion. A noticeably cheerful girl, she is enthusiastic about helping out the school, writing for the school paper and participating on the debate team, and organizing school events. Annie's youthful innocence often, but not always, means that she is less involved with the group's less morally acceptable practices, though she genuinely enjoys spending time with them. She attempts to motivate and manipulate the other study group members with guilt, using her "Disney face". She takes the cohesion of the study group more seriously than the other members and, in trying to get the group to retake Spanish 102 together, gets Señor Chang fired for his fake degree in "English as a Second Language".

Annie has been shown to occasionally choose her interests over keeping the group intact, first by dating Britta's estranged ex-boyfriend Vaughn and (temporarily) choosing to leave Greendale and the group to follow Vaughn to another college, and later by deciding to exclude Jeff from the group and her friendship during his season 3 premiere nervous breakdown when he attacked the table with an ax after accidentally inhaling monkey-gas. On one occasion, her somewhat-illicit cradle sexuality is used to lure Jeff into Glee Club. Nonetheless, these cases rarely result in long-lasting issues. Annie used to pine after Troy, on whom she had a crush since his high school football quarterback days, but that stops when she begins dating Vaughn. At the end of the first season, it appears as if Annie has developed a romantic dynamic with Jeff, whom she kissed both to win a debate competition and at the end of the season. While she is still interested in Jeff at the beginning of season 2, he is more standoffish, and after the study group learns he'd had sex with Britta during the paintball episode, Annie says she thinks of Jeff as "gross". Later in the episode "Asian Population Studies" Annie develops a crush on Dr. Rich Stephenson, a fellow Greendale student that Jeff had clashed with. Jeff seems jealous but refuses to admit it. However, Rich declines Annie's advances due to their age difference. There have been indications that Annie may still harbor feelings for Jeff, and it has been suggested that he may feel similarly. However, it is revealed in "Virtual Systems Analysis" that Annie is coming to terms with how exactly she feels about Jeff when Abed manipulates her because of her apparent feelings for him. Annie learns from the experience that the way she responds to her feelings for Jeff is shallow and immaterial and that any kind of love or feelings like this is not fair to herself or the other person. She also gains a better understanding of Abed as well.

In season 5, Annie has become a salesperson for a pharmaceutical company and returns to Greendale to accomplish better things with her life. She becomes the leader of the Save Greendale Committee. At the end of season 6, she gets an internship at the FBI.

In the series finale "Emotional Consequences of Broadcast Television", Annie said goodbye to Jeff before leaving to catch her Washington, D.C. flight.

=== Troy Barnes ===
Troy Barnes
- Community character
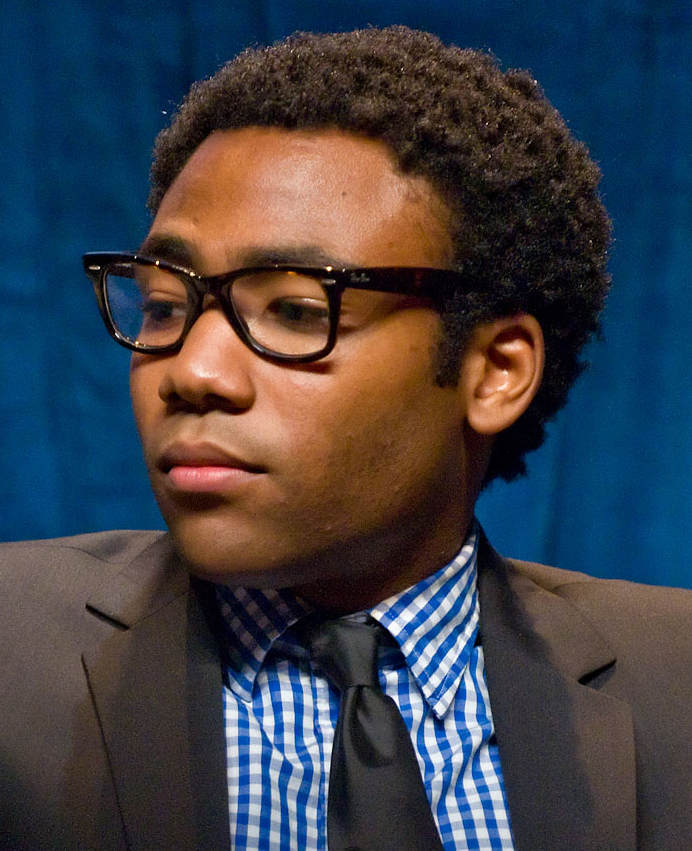
- First appearance: "Pilot" (2009)
- Created by: Dan Harmon
- Portrayed by: Donald Glover
- Voiced by: Donald Glover ("Abed's Uncontrollable Christmas", "Digital Estate Planning" and "Intro to Felt Surrogacy")

In-universe information
- Occupation: Student at Greendale Community College
- Significant others: Britta Perry (ex-girlfriend); Randi (ex-girlfriend)
- Relatives: Nana (grandmother); Carl (uncle, deceased); Dmitiri (cousin, deceased)

Troy Barnes (played by Donald Glover), (seasons 1–5) born December 4, 1989, is a former high school football star and Greendale Community College student. Born and raised in Greendale, Colorado, and raised a Jehovah's Witness, Troy spent two years in fifth grade, but believed it was normal after his mother told him that everyone is "ten for two years". He later made a name for himself as the varsity quarterback of his high school football team and was also prom king. However, he lost his football scholarship by deliberately injuring himself during a "keg flip". His numerous admirers at school included future Greendale peer Annie Edison. Troy's status at Riverside High prompted him to wear his letter jacket for days after his initial enrollment at Greendale. Jeff quickly inferred that this was a sign of Troy's insecurity. He is also afraid of tarantulas, rats, centipedes, lakes ("Environmental Science") and automatic toilets ("Critical Film Studies"). He now plays quarterback for the nonathletic Greendale Human Beings, saying he would rather play football for fun.

While he starts off hanging out with Pierce Hawthorne at Greendale rooms in season 1, Troy immediately becomes best friends with Abed, who feeds and shares Troy's quirky and infectious sense of humor. The two spend most of their time at Greendale together, and many episodes are capped with one of their comedic antics. As the two hang out over the course of the first two seasons, Troy increasingly abandons his identity as a jock and embraces the notion of being a nerd. In doing this, he saves the whole school in the second season's Halloween episode. Troy's fondness for Abed is so strong that he dumps an attractive librarian (Maite Schwartz) immediately after she calls Abed weird. He lurks and fidgets jealously, fearing Jeff and Abed will become best friends when Jeff throws Abed a Pulp Fiction-themed birthday party and buys him a replica briefcase from the actual film. While their bond was nearly destroyed during the pillow-blanket fort campus "war" of 2012 in "Pillows and Blankets", quick thinking from Jeff Winger and imaginary "friendship hats" ultimately saved the day. However, it also became plain that Troy and his best friend have big and deep differences.

Instead of being Abed's roommate for their sophomore year, Troy decides to live in Pierce's mansion ("Pascal's Triangle Revisited"). While living with him over the summer, Troy starts up a Twitter account documenting unintentionally funny/horrible things Pierce says at "old-whitemansays", which Pierce was originally angry about but embraced after learning the account had 600,000 followers. Because Pierce has old-school, homogenizing racism issues, Troy initially needs to assert that Shirley is not his mother and later says that Shirley is not his cousin.

Long oblivious to Annie's romantic interest in him, Troy makes a few broad attempts at wooing her but fails ("Romantic Expressionism"). In the second season, it is hinted that Troy has feelings for Britta, and Troy lies about having his uncle molest him to take advantage of Britta's attraction to men with pain ("Competitive Wine Tasting"). Troy kisses Britta but comes clean about his lie and is disappointed when she claims kissing him was a mistake.

Though he repeatedly tries to deny it, Troy is skilled at plumbing and air-conditioner repair, expertise recognized by the Greendale plumbing underground as well as Greendale's air-conditioning technical school powerhouse cabal ("Advanced Gay"), who have launched a fierce campaign to convince him to leave the regular school and join their ranks. Troy also plays down the serious interest he shares with Britta in interpretive dance, which conflicts with his fading image as a football player. His lifetime idol is actor LeVar Burton, but he is so terrified to meet Burton in person that when he does so, he goes catatonic. A reliable source of boyish faux-dumb wit, Troy has many unique opinions and beliefs: all dogs are male and all cats female; he is also distracted by shiny objects and cries over minor emotional setbacks. Troy has evolved from the start of the series as a cocky, selfish, image-obsessed boy to a goofy and passionate, yet goodhearted and responsible, young man.

In "History 101", it is revealed that Britta and Troy have begun dating. They break up in "Basic Human Anatomy".

In season 5, Troy returns and becomes a member of the Save Greendale Committee. After Pierce's funeral, Troy was given his remaining shares of Hawthorne Wipes, weighing at about $14.3 million, on the condition that he sails around the world. Pierce had the chance to do so but failed and called it his biggest regret; he wants Troy to do it, and Troy accepts. Troy then leaves with LeVar Burton in "Geothermal Escapism", his final appearance on the show (as Glover left to pursue his music career). A news report in "Analysis of Cork-Based Networking" claims that pirates have abducted Burton and a "non-celebrity" in the Gulf of Mexico. In "Basic Email Security", Frankie mentions that Troy mysteriously vanished after Pierce masturbated himself to death.

Troy briefly appears, in Spider-Man pajamas, on a background TV screen in the 2018 film Spider-Man: Into the Spider-Verse (inspired by Troy's pajamas in "Anthropology 101", which inspired Marvel Comics to create the Miles Morales version of Spider-Man seen in the film. Troy's actor, Donald Glover, also appears as Aaron in Spider-Man: Homecoming).

=== Pierce Hawthorne ===
Pierce Hawthorne
- Community character
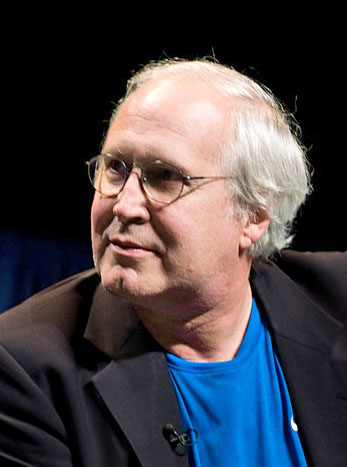
- First appearance: "Pilot" (2009)
- Last appearance: "Repilot" (2014)
- Created by: Dan Harmon
- Portrayed by: Chevy Chase
- Residence: 4319 Cranesworth Rd., Greendale, CO, US, 80022

In-universe information
- Full name: Piercinald Anastasia Hawthorne
- Occupation: Student at Greendale Community College; CEO of Hawthorne Wipes (Former); Co-owner of Shirley's Sandwiches
- Family: Cornelius Hawthorne (father, deceased); Mrs Hawthorne (mother, deceased); Gilbert Lawson (half-brother)
- Spouses: April (ex-wife); Wanda (ex-wife); 5 unnamed ex-wives
- Children: Amber (ex-stepdaughter); 31 other ex-stepchildren

Piercinald Anastasia "Pierce" Hawthorne (Note: In "Pillows and Blankets", the details given on Pierce's medical history (including his residence and date of birth) show his full name as "Pierce Cornelius Hawthorne". His father refers to him by his full name, Piercinald, in Advanced Gay.) (played by Chevy Chase; seasons 1–4 main cast, season 5 guest), born August 10, 1943, deceased c. 2014, is a moist towelette tycoon attending Greendale Community College. His father founded Hawthorne Wipes, the award-winning moist towelette company. He claims to be a world traveler, a toastmaster, magician, keyboardist, and self-styled hypnotherapist, and considers himself a "quality-of-life person".

He enrolled in Greendale in 1999, looking for friendship and popularity, but is held back by his clumsiness and lack of tolerance. Much older than most Greendale students, he is often confused by youth culture while still embracing it. ("Introduction to Statistics"). He also unknowingly buys into many sexist and racist stereotypes, which often lead him to make offensive statements, of the nature of which he's completely unaware. Much of this is directed at Shirley, who he sometimes mistakes for other black women ("The Art of Discourse"); Abed, who he suspects is a terrorist because he is Muslim; and Jeff, who he actively tries to roast in an attempt to be cool, despite his inability to do so with wit. This leads Troy to start up a Twitter account with 600,000 followers called "oldwhitemansays" ("Anthropology 101"), documenting anything controversial said by Pierce. When he finds out, he is furious at Troy until Troy reveals the number of followers, prompting Pierce to encourage Troy to keep the account going. After his behavior became merciless in season 2, the study group put Pierce on a "diet" with a strict limit on when and how often he can say offensive things. ("Custody Law and Eastern European Diplomacy") Although he has occasionally made negative comments about Jews, he has also said that Annie Edison (the only Jewish member of the group) is his favorite person in it ("Intermediate Documentary Filmmaking"). It is also suspected that he has subdued feelings for the second youngest female in the group, Britta Perry. Given his age, eccentricity and out-of-touch behavior, Pierce occasionally surprises his friends with wise insight and advice when they truly need it.

Though he considers himself to be a "Reformed Neo-Buddhist", he is a member of an obscure religious cult. In season 1's "The Science of Illusion", the group tricks him into dressing as the Cookie Crisp Wizard to achieve a level of ascension in his cult. His religion also plays an important role when his mother dies in the season 2 episode "The Psychology of Letting Go" and Pierce believes his "Buddhist" teachings that she will be reborn, carrying a canister of what he thinks is his mother's soul around (in actuality a lava lamp). When, along with Jeff and Troy, he listens to a compact disc made by his mother telling him she's gone and encouraging him to let her go and live his life, Pierce simply shrugs it off as her losing her mind. At the same time, Jeff decides he's better off with that rationale and lets him continue with his belief.

Pierce has been married seven times and has 32 "ex-stepchildren" he tries to be close with, though most of them either avoid him or take advantage of him for his wealth. He is the author of Greendale's unusual school song and was a member of Vaughn's band for a brief time. He is also severely claustrophobic. Because of his moist towelette business, Pierce is very wealthy and owns a mansion, where Troy also lives over the summer and during the second year. It has been shown that Pierce may often act out because of how he was raised by his cruel, bigoted father Cornelius, who even went to the extent of hiring another boy to play Pierce in a commercial while scorning and putting down the real Pierce ("Celebrity Pharmacology").

In season 2, Pierce becomes more agitated at the study group for leaving him out of their activities. He temporarily joins an elderly group of students who act like teenagers called the Hipsters to feel accepted ("Messianic Myths and Ancient Peoples"). He breaks both of his legs in a trampoline accident after revealing a secret trampoline Jeff and Troy were hiding ("Aerodynamics of Gender"). To move around, he buys himself an ineffective wheelchair powered by his breath, for which he claims to have outbid three hospitals. After this, he grows dependent on his painkillers and also becomes increasingly at odds with the study group because of the combination of his heartless behavior and their tendency to exclude him from their activities. He begins to play the role of the study group's villain, but both trends seem to subside when he comes to terms with the group after overdosing on his painkillers. These underlying tensions come to a head in "A Fistful of Paintballs", when it's revealed that the other members of the group secretly took a vote about whether they'd include him in the group next year, with only Annie voting to keep him in; by the end of "For a Few Paintballs More", while the other group members have reconsidered and are willing to let him back in the group, Pierce says he's not interested in staying with "whatever this is" and shocks them by walking out on them for (what seemed like at the time) good. Before this, he told the group that he always assumes people who have relationships with him will inevitably get sick of him, so he continually tests and provokes people to ensure he won't be destroyed emotionally when they leave him; all seven of his marriages followed this dynamic. He had never kept a group of friends at Greendale for longer than a semester (until he joined the study group).

However, at the start of season 3, he promptly returns and rejoins the study group, regaining an overall center of relaxation. Having always sought the approval of his even more bigoted father, Cornelius Hawthorne (Larry Cedar), he becomes more uncooperative after his death ("Advanced Gay"). After Hawthorne Wipes's board subsequently fires him, he tries to open up a sandwich shop on campus with Shirley. The sandwich shop's space is rented out instead to Subway, and together, Pierce and Shirley work to sabotage the Subway restaurant. In "Curriculum Unavailable", Shirley delivers a speech against the Subway restaurant, and it is destroyed in the ensuing riot. In "Introduction to Finality", Dean Pelton then offers the space to Shirley and Pierce, but because there is only one signature space, Pierce and Shirley file suit for the rights to the sandwich shop. After an inspirational Winger speech, Pierce fires his lawyer, Alan Connor (Rob Corddry), and he and Shirley agree to have joint ownership of Shirley's Sandwich Shop by having Jeff sign the papers.

Pierce has much less to do in Season 4, which reflected the off-camera conflicts that led to his actor quitting the series entirely before the year was completed (Chase agreed to appear in a handful of episodes after he quit, and his departure from the show wasn't obvious or written into any episodes). His main contributions to the year were being so disgusted with how Jeff was treating Britta in "Herstory of Dance" that he used his former Hawthorne Wipes' ties to the Lilith Fair to get Sophie B. Hawkins to appear at a dance she was running, admitting in puppet form that he'd never actually had sex with Eartha Kitt despite falsely bragging of this for years, and finishing a group assignment in "Basic Human Anatomy" when everyone else was involved in personal dramas and unavailable. In the season 4 finale, "Advanced Introduction to Finality", Pierce finally graduates from Greendale. He later appears in a cameo during the season 5 premiere, "Repilot", as a pre-recorded holographic projection in a courtyard at Greendale. It is revealed that the hologram was donated in compliance with a court order he was "not allowed to discuss" and that he has "no legal right" to be on the Greendale campus as a result of the lawsuit. The recording also reveals that the Greendale College Quad is home to the "Pierce Hawthorne Museum of Gender Sensitivity and Sexual Potency". In the season 5 episode "Basic Intergluteal Numismatics", Shirley reveals to the group that Pierce has died; in the following episode, "Cooperative Polygraphy", they are forced to take a lie detector test in compliance with Pierce's will to prove that none of them murdered him, and in order to receive his inheritance. He leaves them some parting words and gifts; Jeff a bottle of scotch, Annie a tiara, Britta an iPod Nano and Shirley his timeshare in Florida. Finally, he leaves Troy his remaining shares in his moist towelette company, worth over $14 million. As a condition, he insists that Troy must sail around the world since when Pierce himself had the opportunity, he spent it cruising around Belize doing cocaine with John Denver. He also leaves each member of the study group a cryogenic cylinder of his frozen sperm should they like to artificially reproduce with his genes, the filling of which is revealed to have caused his death.

=== Ben Chang ===
Ben Chang
- Community character
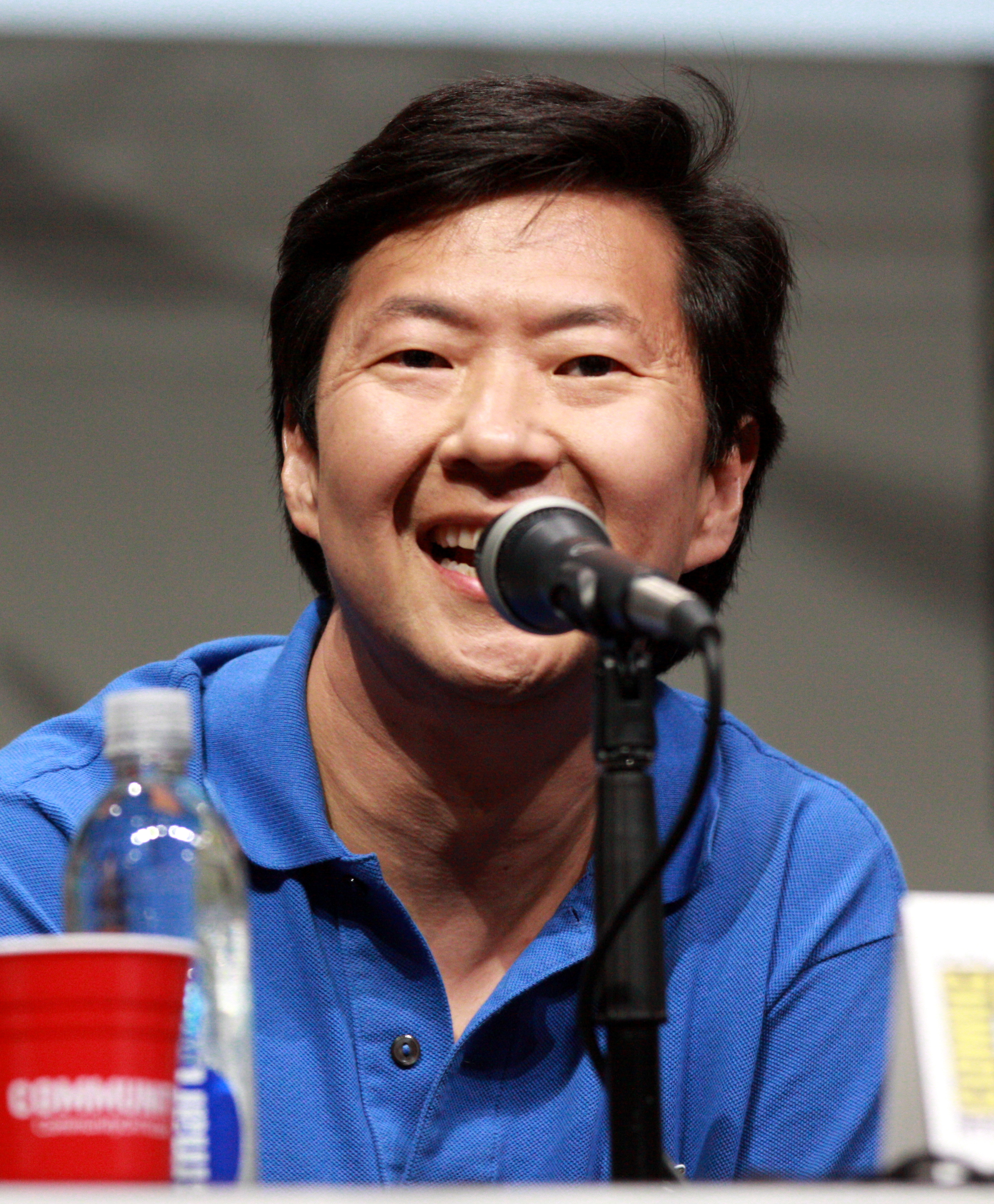
- First appearance: "Spanish 101" (2009)
- Created by: Dan Harmon
- Portrayed by: Ken Jeong

In-universe information
- Full name: Benjamin Franklin Chang
- Alias: Kevin
- Nicknames: Ben, Kevin, Señor
- Title: Señor Chang
- Occupation: Spanish teacher (season 1); Student (season 2); Security guard (season 3); Math teacher (seasons 5 and 6)
- Family: Rabbi Chang (brother); Connie Chang (twin sister; "eaten in utero")
- Spouse: Alessandra Chang (Ex-Wife)
- Relatives: Jin (nephew)

Benjamin Franklin Chang (played by Ken Jeong), referred to as Señor Chang in season 1 and widely as Kevin in season 4, was originally the study group's unhinged Spanish teacher. In the first season, he is the only main character who is not a member of the Spanish study group. At the end of the first season, however, it is revealed that he does not have any teaching qualifications and that, like Jeff, he will have to attend Greendale as a student to get a degree.

He can be quite theatrical at times (once even faking his own death to get a rise out of his students), and also has a huge ego. His anger management issues are constantly evident. He acts in mean-spirited ways with minimal stimulus; during his classes, he frequently picked on Annie for apparently no reason other than her desk being closest to where he stood while addressing his students. It is made clear in multiple episodes that he initially takes certain situations far too seriously: In "Modern Warfare", he tries to eliminate Jeff and Britta by shooting at them with an automatic paintball gun and later activates a bomb of paint hidden in his jacket to try to eliminate Jeff. In "Competitive Ecology", he claims to be a "detective" of the school after being on the Security team for a month. He starts hunting for clues to solve a "case" after meeting a distressed student (which in reality was just a coincidence) and later burns down a school section while doing so. These over-the-top personality traits veil deep issues of being left by his wife, with whom he was later reunited, although this did not hinder his rash behavior towards his students afterward.

Chang has an antagonistic relationship with almost every student and faculty member at Greendale. He is on terrible terms with Dr Duncan ("Pascal's Triangle Revisited", "The Psychology of Letting Go"), who potentially foreshadows Chang's lack of teaching qualifications when in "Advanced Criminal Law", he notes Chang demands to be called "Señor" because he is not a real professor. In the season 1 finale, Chang and Duncan come to blows when Chang becomes a student, and Duncan is suspended from teaching, resulting in a physical battle at the end-of-the-year dance. Though Duncan gets a restraining order against him, Chang, in turn, nullifies this by getting a restraining order against Duncan, thus allowing him to take his anthropology class. They seem to have formed grudging respect for each other since.

His brother is Rabbi Chang, who criticizes Señor Chang's confusing title and behavior. On several occasions, Chang claims to have eaten his twin sister Connie in utero. He enjoys jetting around on a scooter, plays the keytar as an instrument, and has a history of having his clothes stolen from the local YMCA. According to Chang in "Modern Warfare", he plays paintball three times a week, and he uses his skill in the sport against Jeff and Britta. As a student, he seeks a degree in music theory to use his keytar skills professionally. In the Halloween episode of season 2, he and Shirley have a sexual interlude after they bond over how their costumes are misunderstood (she being Glinda the Good Witch and not Miss Piggy, and he being Peggy Fleming and not Kristi Yamaguchi or Michelle Kwan). Beyond the evidence of a voicemail that Chang sent to Troy, no one remembers this incident due to a government coverup of the entire Halloween party.

His self-proclaimed nickname is "El Tigre Chino" (Spanish: "The Chinese Tiger"), and he owns a black jacket which has on the back that moniker and the image of a tiger. His office features a portrait of him as a matador with "El Tigre" at the bottom and a statue of a tiger.

In season 2, he is in the same anthropology class as the study group. In the episode "Anthropology 101", after he asks the study group to let him join them, he is then seen in the study room secretly plotting his revenge on them for getting him fired, switching between evil and right sides like the character Gollum from The Lord of the Rings. He eventually joins the study group in the episode "Asian Population Studies" after being voted in over Rich. He proves his worth in the next episode helping Annie and the group save their drug awareness play from Pierce's antics. Chang wants to get to know Shirley after discovering that he may have impregnated her on Halloween, a night that no one at Greendale can remember. His rescue of Annie initially seems to win over Shirley. However, she is visibly disturbed to see his too unbalanced behavior. He later moves in with Jeff after his wife throws him out again (after he confesses his fling with Shirley), but Jeff grows sick of his stupid, unbalanced behavior and finally orders him out. However, his behavior in helping Shirley when she goes into labor during a riot at Greendale wins her over to the point that after the baby (whose father is Shirley's former husband Andre) is born, she decides to name her newborn son Ben after him.

In the season 3 premiere, Chang is still homeless and has taken to living in the air ducts on the Greendale campus. When Dean Pelton discovers this (by Chang being driven into his office during the pest-control operation), he offers Chang room and board to work as a security guard. When the rest of the security staff soon quits, including Sgt. Nuñez, he becomes head of campus security. He is not good at his job, and the school cannot afford more human resources (an offer of a random credit for student volunteers produces no results). Still, at an off-campus bar mitzvah, Chang strikes up a friendship with a gaggle of pre-teens and somehow recruits them into his ranks as the "Changlorious Basterds" (described in "Pillows and Blankets" as being "like Inglourious Basterds, but with 'Chang' instead of 'In'").

Both Chang and his "Changlorious Basterds" take part in the massive pillow fight at Greendale that results from Abed and Troy's conflict over a world record. Later, after the death of Alex "Star-Burns" Osborne, Chang requests increased privileges as head of Greendale security from the dean, who initially refuses his request. However, after a riot caused by the study group breaks out at Star-Burns' wake, Chang and his security team (now dressed in riot gear and equipped with batons and pepper spray) subdue the student body and restore order to Greendale, with Chang self-titling himself as General and calling the study group his "prisoners" for inciting the event.

In the wake of the riot, Dean Pelton decides to fire Ben and pin the blame for causing the damage to the school on him. However, Chang instead replaces the dean with a doppelgänger, tranquilizing the real dean and keeping him prisoner within Greendale. The fake dean, under the orders of Chang, supports the school board at the trial against Jeff and the study group who have been dubbed "The Greendale Seven", and the study group is expelled.

With the study group gone, Chang takes over Greendale, installing his "Changlorious Basterds" as school-wide security officers and keeping the real Dean under heavy security.

At a group therapy session, originally meant for Abed only, the therapist told the study group that Greendale does not exist and the past three years of their life have been delusions. In contrast, they have lived in a mental hospital. The study group initially believes the therapist but quickly realizes his lies when he is found trying to escape out a window and pointing out that they have backpacks and photos from the school. It is exposed that Chang hired the therapist to dissuade them from ever trying to return, and with this knowledge, the Greendale Seven vows to get their school back.

After gaining intel on the inner workings of Chang's rule over Greendale, the study group plans an "elaborate heist", attempting to rescue the real dean and expose Chang to the school board. While it initially looks as if the heist has failed, Chang realizes the study group has fooled him, and the failed plan was merely part of a larger plan that succeeds. However, Chang admits the actual plan in time and stops the study group from leaving. He explains his goal: to burn down the Greendale records and thereby erase any evidence of his wrongdoing but fails to see that this could potentially burn down the entire school and kill everyone. With help from the Greendale Air-Conditioning Repair School, Troy and the group manage to escape Chang's imprisonment and prevent the fire from starting.

In a showdown with the study group, both Jeff and Chang equip electric taser batons with which they intend to duel. However, this is quickly cut short by the school board arriving, demanding explanations for both the real and fake Deans fighting each other and Chang's actions in running Greendale. He vows to explain but quickly runs out the door.

In the season 3 finale montage, it is shown that Chang has taken to living in air ducts again. However, this time, he resides in the vents at City College, foreshadowing a possible alliance between the two in season 4. However, he returns to Greendale in season four with no apparent memory of his identity or previous actions, referring to his condition as "Changnesia". However, at the end of the episode "Advanced Documentary Filmmaking", it is revealed he is faking Changnesia. In "Heroic Origins", after Abed realizes that it was because of Chang that the study group all went to Greendale and tells him he was always a part of the group and hints that he knows that "Kevin" was faking "Changnesia". He then calls Dean Stephen Spreck, Dean of City College, that he is out of the plan to destroy Greendale. In season 5, Chang decides to turn himself in for his crimes and returns to Greendale under work release as a math professor, living in the school. He exhibits more social behavior in season 5 and later joins the Save Greendale Committee. However in the finale, he sides with those trying to sell Greendale. When the sale is prevented, Chang double-crosses the school board again by stealing their money and replacing his teeth with diamond fillings.

In season 6, Chang sees some success as an actor after appearing in a stage adaptation of The Karate Kid and a ham commercial that goes viral. He briefly moves to Los Angeles and is hired for a film directed by Steven Spielberg. His career abruptly ends, however, when he gets into trouble and accidentally insults Spielberg. He returns and realizes that he truly feels at home at Greendale and that he is his "best self" with the group. During an extended group hug in the season 6 finale, Chang reveals himself to have been a closeted homosexual throughout the series, tearfully declaring that he is "legit gay".

=== Craig Pelton ===
Craig Pelton
- Community character
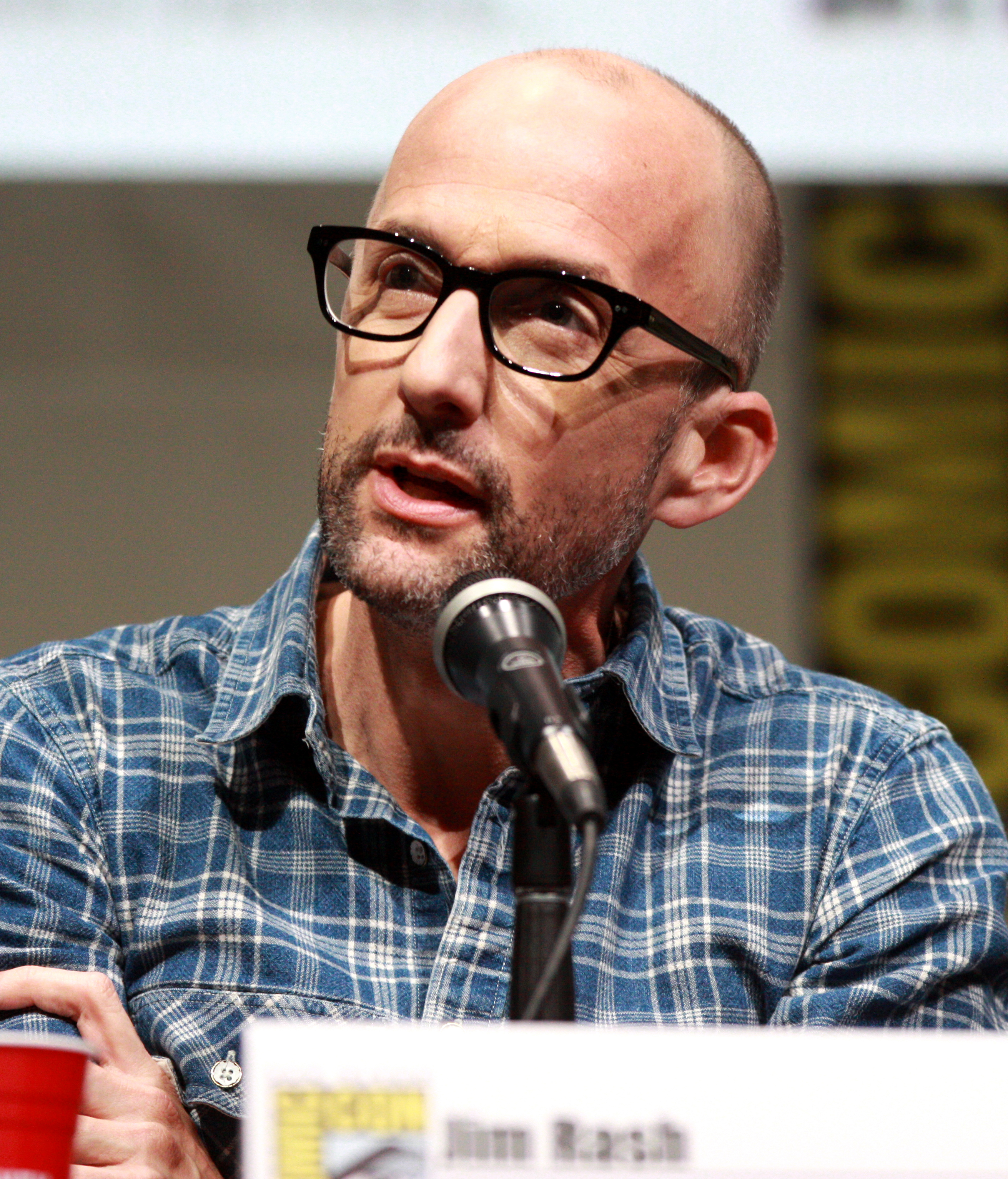
- First appearance: "Pilot" (2009)
- Created by: Dan Harmon
- Portrayed by: Jim Rash

In-universe information
- Full name: Craig Isidore Pelton
- Alias: The Dean
- Title: Dean Pelton
- Occupation: Dean of Greendale Community College
- Family: Unnamed father

Dean Craig Isidore Pelton (Jim Rash) (recurring seasons 1–2, starring season 3–6) was an educator at Greendale for ten years, after or during which he earned a Bachelor of Education degree at the fictional Appomattox University, and, when the series begins, has been Greendale's dean for five years. He desperately wants Greendale to be a "real" university, maintaining an intense rivalry with nearby City College, whose dean seems personally committed to Greendale's downfall. When first introduced, Pelton is obsessively politically correct, as evidenced when he changes the Greendale mascot from the Greendale Grizzly to the racially-, gender-, and age-neutral Greendale Human Being in "Football, Feminism and You"; his explanation for the change is that "most of these people [Greendale students] have been called animals their entire lives."

In the early seasons, Pelton has a habit of dressing in elaborate costumes for Greendale events or for simple announcements. These costumes have included Tina Turner, Julius Caesar, Lady Gaga, and other famous figures, in addition to more abstract costumes, such as one that was half-male and half-female. This quirk gradually fades as Pelton begins to be more directly involved in the study group's adventures.

Pelton has displayed various fetishes, the most prominent being his increasing fascination with men dressed in Dalmatian costumes during the first season, after he sees an internet video-clip featuring a man dressed in such an outfit (muttering to himself, "this better not awaken anything in me...").

Pelton displays many quirks and eccentricities regarding his sexual orientation; Vice Dean Laybourne describes him as a "pansexual imp" ("Biology 101"), and when once called a "fruit" by student Leonard ("Messianic Myths and Ancient Peoples"), Pelton offhandedly says that the term is "barely the whole truth". Pelton displays an obvious and increasingly obsessive crush on Jeff Winger, treating Jeff with favoritism and inappropriately touching him (particularly on the chest) when he is nearby. In the season 6 episode "Queer Studies and Advanced Waxing", Dean Pelton is recruited to the school board as a token homosexual but is uncomfortable with the label, saying being gay is only "two-sevenths" of what he identifies as, and resumes his job as dean after the charade becomes too much to handle.

Despite his ongoing over-the-top behavior, Pelton has many bouts of self-doubt and confusion, once questioning his life choices after realizing that he had gone "too far" with one of his costumes and would have to wear it to the bank that day, commenting to himself that he needs to "get [his] life together".

== Recurring characters ==
The series also features many recurring characters, who are students and staff members at Greendale.

=== Faculty ===
==== Ian Duncan ====
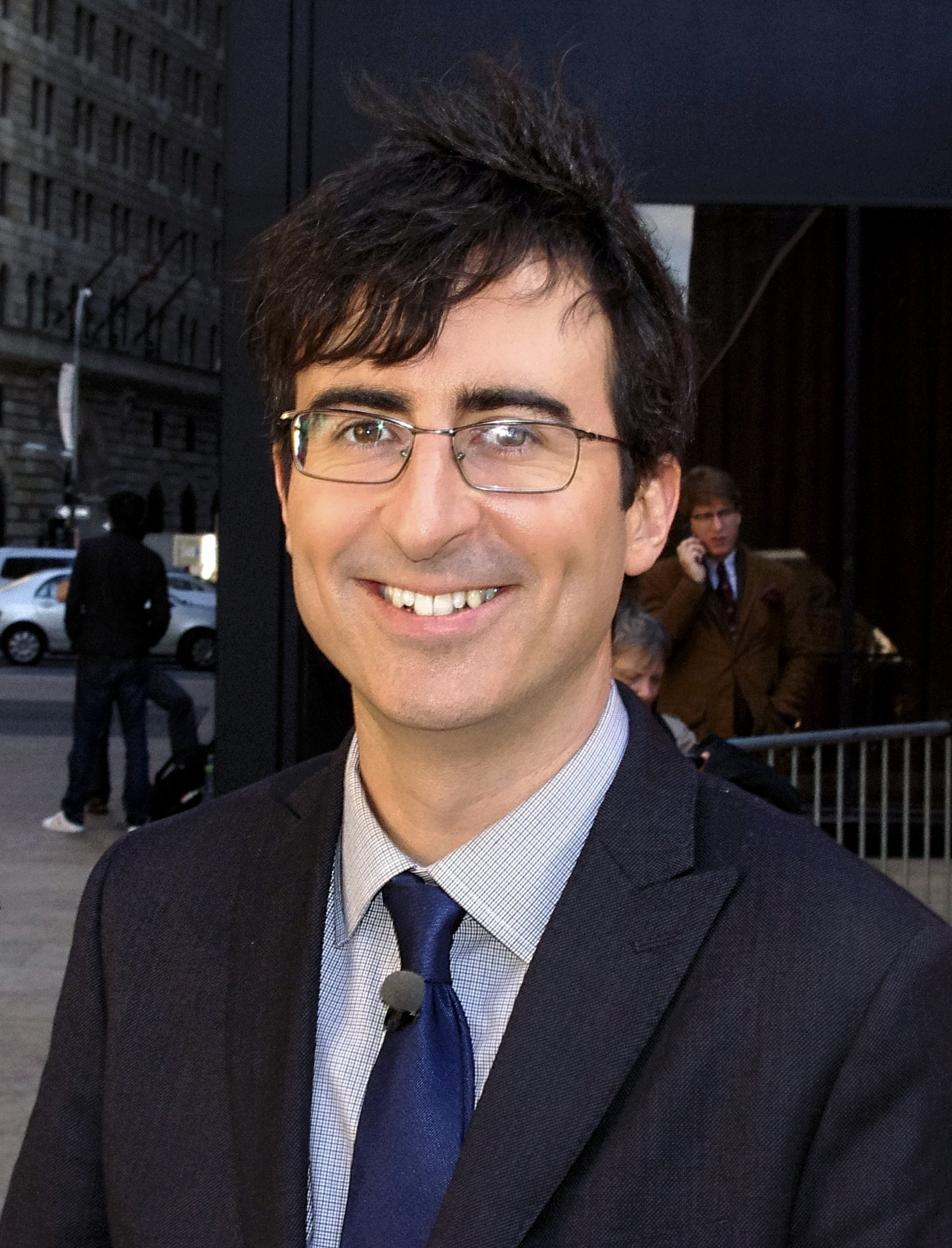
John Oliver in 2011

Dr. Ian Duncan (played by John Oliver) is a British-born professor of psychology at Greendale. Duncan seems to be a highly qualified professor and therapist, but is not above scheming for personal gain like trying to con Jeff out of his Lexus or exploiting Abed's issues to advance his career. Though Jeff once successfully represented him as a lawyer by exploiting the legal system, Duncan refuses to help him cheat on principle. He provides free therapy to several students, including Britta and, at one point, hopes to write about Abed's issues for a book deal. He also has a rivalry with Señor Chang and willingly mocks Chang over being fired and subsequently becoming a Greendale student. At the end of the first season, he is suspended by Dean Pelton for his drunken behavior at a school function, prompting Chang to punch Duncan in the face. Because of this, he gets a restraining order against Chang while chasing him around and preventing him from getting to places. After Greendale suspended Professor Bauer, he took over her anthropology class, despite his complete lack of knowledge about the subject. In "Abed's Uncontrollable Christmas", Duncan played a prominent role in guiding Abed through his suppressed feelings about Christmas. It is also implied in that episode that Duncan had a miserable childhood growing up in a dysfunctional family in Islington before immigrating to the United States with his grandmother. He never knew the identity of his father and later admitted his mother worked as a prostitute in a pub in Scunthorpe, Lincolnshire. As is alluded to several times throughout his appearances, Duncan appears to have a drinking problem. Duncan did not appear in the third season, although Britta is now enrolled in his Intro to Psychology class, and his name is seen on the cover of her textbook as the author. The fourth season refers to his unexplained disappearance when Troy asks the group if anyone had seen him lately ("Intro to Felt Surrogacy").

In the season 5 episode "Basic Intergluteal Numismatics", Duncan returns joining the Save Greendale Committee, explaining his absence saying he had been taking care of his sick mother, although he stopped because he had "put in [his] time". His alcoholism and stalking of Britta have both returned. He gives up on pursuing Britta after sharing an intimate conversation with her in "Bondage and Beta Male Sexuality". He is absent again in season 6, though in the premiere episode "Ladders", Abed is seen wiping the nameplate on his door.

==== Buzz Hickey ====
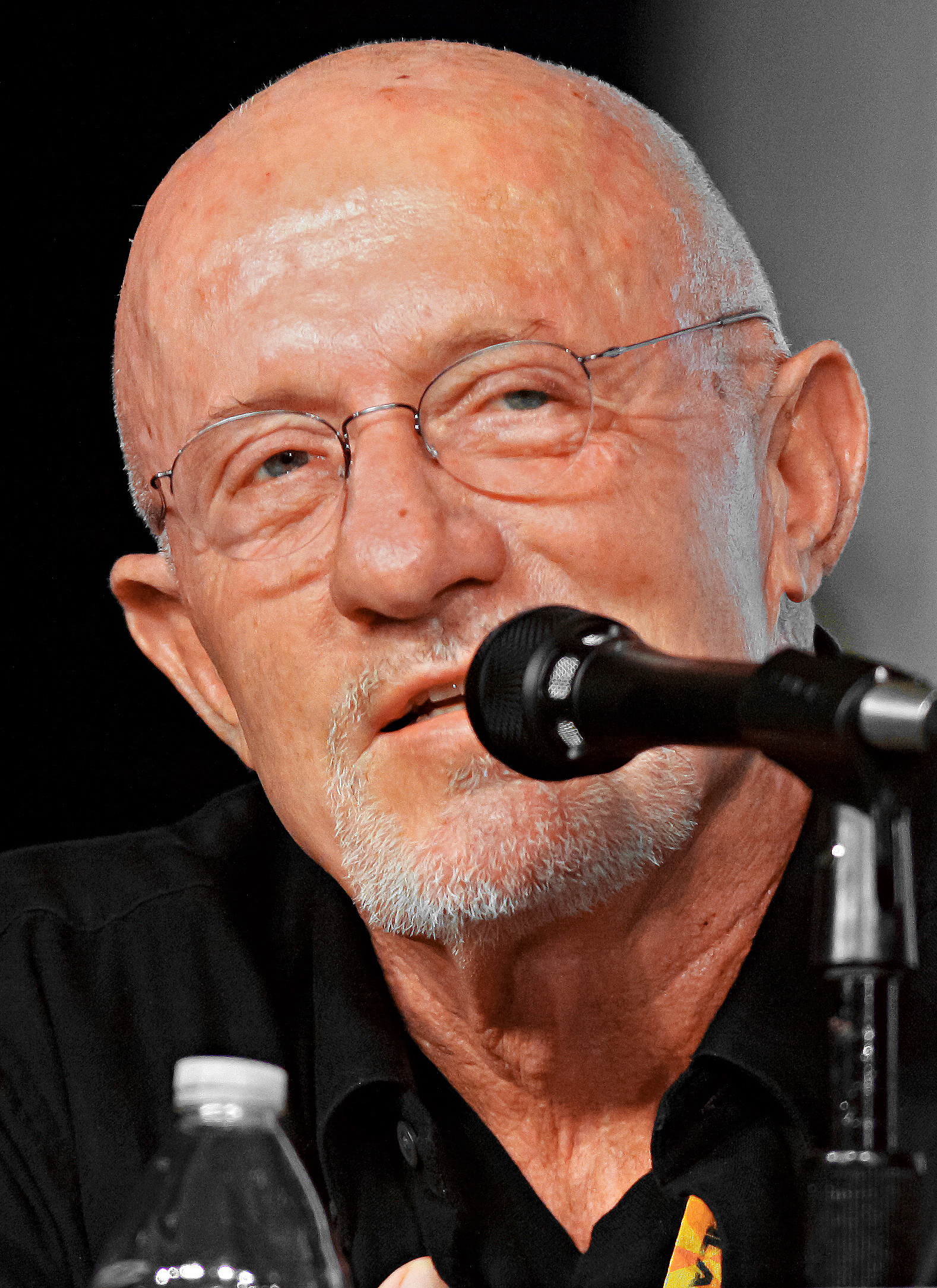
Jonathan Banks

Prof. Buzz Hickey (played by Jonathan Banks) is a criminology professor and Jeff's officemate in season five. Hickey is a military veteran and former police detective, and his gruff demeanor is a result of his fifteen-year tenure at Greendale. He serves as a mentor to Jeff, helping him to make the transition from student to teacher. Hickey is a member of the Save Greendale Committee and Annie's criminology teacher. Hickey is also an aspiring artist and writer, and he is currently working on a comic strip entitled "Jim the Duck". He becomes film partners with Abed in "Bondage and Beta Male Sexuality". It is revealed that Hickey lost his virginity to Duncan's aunt while stationed in England, and it is implied that he may have fathered Duncan's cousin. He has a strained relationship with his son Hank, resulting in his being excluded from his grandson Sebastian's life. They tentatively restore their differences in the episode "Advanced Advanced Dungeons & Dragons". He has a better relationship with his other son, Furio, who is gay, and spends Christmas and Thanksgiving with his sister, Rachel. Hickey is not seen again after season five and in the season six episode "Basic E-mail Security", one of the Greendale Lunchlady's hacked e-mails has the subject line "Buzz Hickey Memorial Services", seemingly implying either that Hickey died off-screen or that he has begun his own memorial service business.

==== Frankie Dart ====
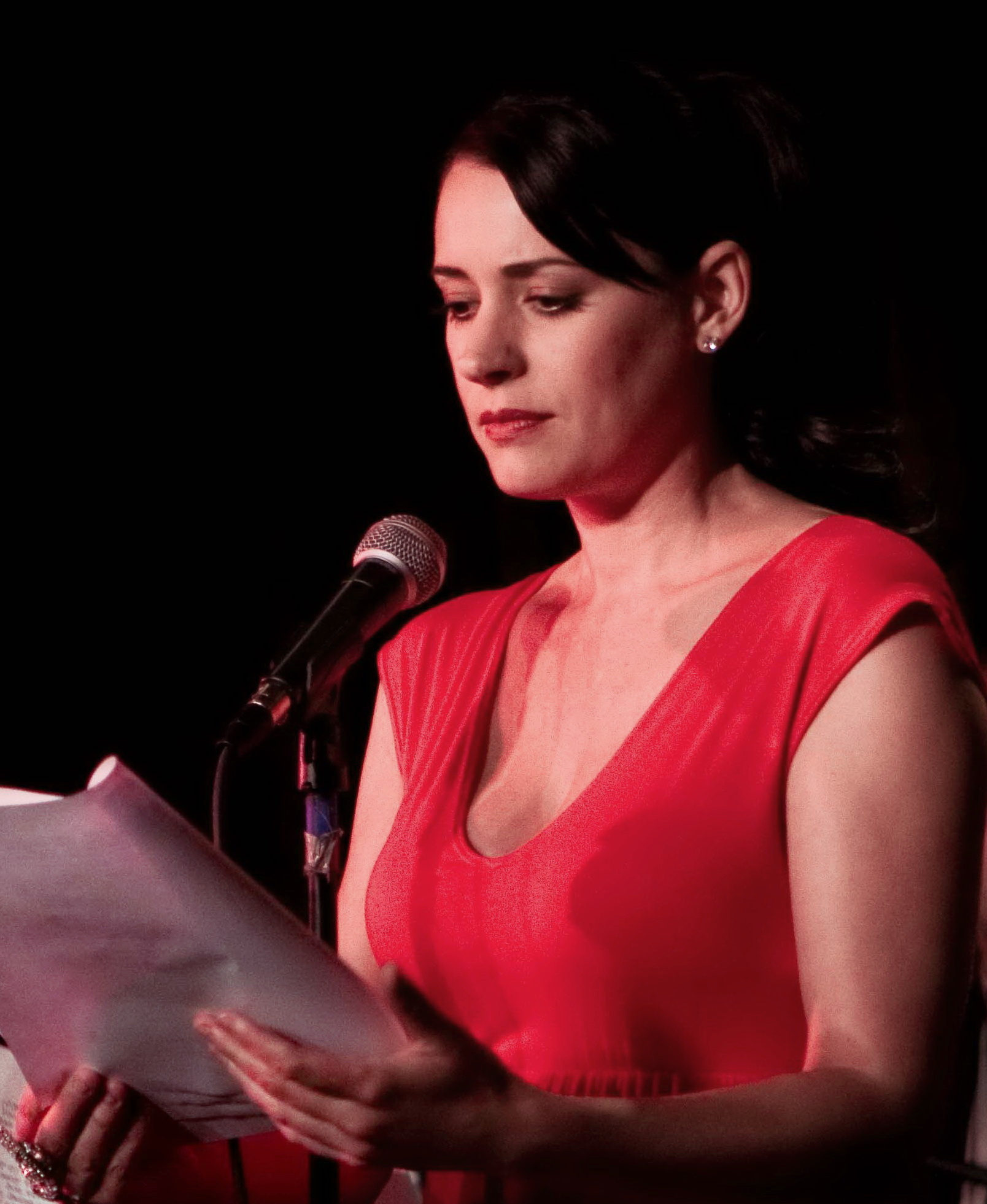
Paget Brewster

Francesca "Frankie" Dart (played by Paget Brewster) is a consultant hired to help improve Greendale in "Ladders". The group initially ostracizes her from the Save Greendale Committee for altering the fabric of the Greendale they know and the dynamic of the group itself. Still, she is soon integrated into the group as a friend.

Frankie often acts as a stabilizing element for the group, referring to their relationship as "codependent" ("Wedding Videography") and immediately recognizing issues such as the unhealthy "will they/won't they" between Jeff and Annie, the absurd fact that Chang was once the group's teacher, and Jeff's troubles with alcohol.

Beginning with the episode "Queer Studies and Advanced Waxing", the question of Frankie's sexuality becomes something of a running gag and a curiosity among the group, who even place bets on it ("Basic Email Security"), with Jeff guessing "Chapstick lesbian" and Annie making a guess so disgusting that no one will repeat it.

In the end ("Emotional Consequences of Broadcast Television"), Frankie's improvements to the school enable Greendale to be officially "saved" and remove the need for the Save Greendale Committee. Frankie remains in her position and in the group, who decide to name themselves the "Nipple Dippers".

Brewster previously appeared in the fifth season episode "Analysis of Cork-Based Networking" as the head of Greendale's IT department, Debra Chambers.

==== Elroy Patashnik ====
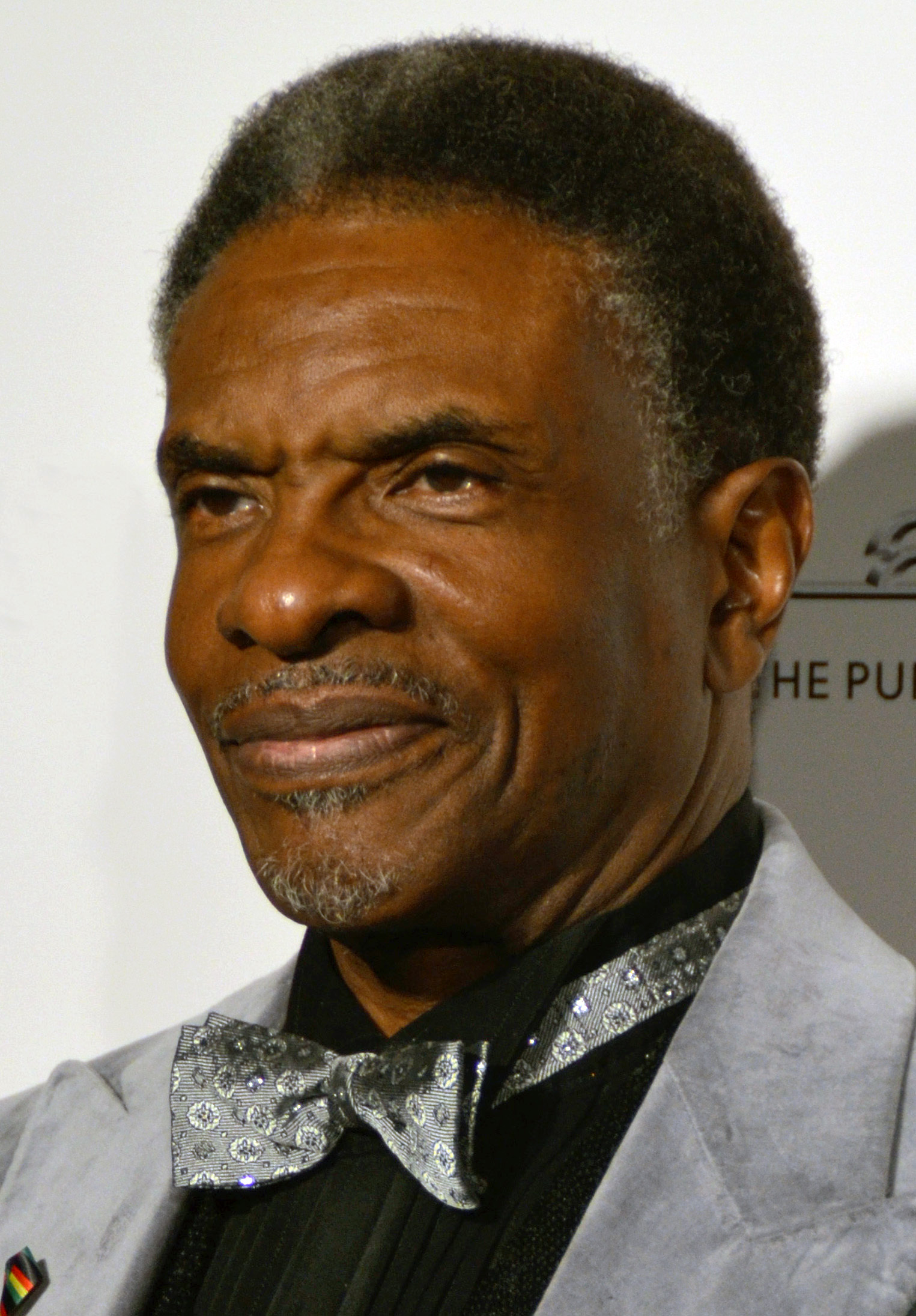
Keith David

Elroy Patashnik (played by Keith David) is a failed inventor and software programmer. He developed a virtual reality company and lives in a recreational vehicle.

He decides to enroll at Greendale to reinvent his life in "Lawnmower Maintenance and Postnatal Care", joining the Save Greendale Committee shortly after. He is hired as head of Greendale's IT Department in "Queer Studies and Advanced Waxing".

He is a fan of the 1990s alternative rock band Natalie is Freezing, and briefly dated the lead singer Julie. Elroy initially remains aloof from the rest of the group, but bonds with them over a board game called The Ears Have It in "Advanced Safety Features". In "Emotional Consequences of Broadcast Television", Elroy leaves Colorado for California after getting a job at LinkedIn.

David previously appeared in the third season episode "Pillows and Blankets" as the narrator.

==== Prof. Michelle Slater ====
Prof. Michelle Slater (played by Lauren Stamile) is a statistics professor at Greendale. She had a strict policy against dating students, but became romantically involved with Jeff, after he begged her to sleep with him during a Halloween party ("Introduction to Statistics"). She and Jeff share a similarly tough sense of humor and cynicism. Later on, she breaks off their relationship. She later reacquires interest in Jeff, consequently developing a rivalry with Britta for his attention ("Pascal's Triangle Revisited"). Jeff later states that if he did pursue a relationship with her, it would evolve him, while a relationship with Britta would help him know more about who he is. In addition to Jeff, she draws interest from other faculty members, such as Señor Chang and Dr Duncan, who have made comically bad attempts to seduce her. Troy and Abed's closed-circuit television show of the student body elections ("Intro to Political Science") later notes that she is missing.

==== Prof. Eustice Whitman ====
Prof. Eustice Whitman (played by John Michael Higgins) is an accounting professor at Greendale Community College, the college's debate coach and a strong believer in carpe diem. Despite believing that Whitman would be an easy teacher, Jeff had trouble passing his accounting class in "Introduction to Film" since Whitman grades his students not on their academics but on how well they "seize the day". In "Debate 109", he instructs Jeff as coach of the debate team and offers him unsolicited advice on how to lead his life fully in different circumstances.

==== Prof. Sean Garrity ====
Prof. Sean Garrity (played by Kevin Corrigan) is the theatrical drama instructor at Greendale. He gets involved in a conspiracy intrigue with Jeff, Annie, and Dean Pelton, when he mysteriously poses as Jeff's fake Conspiracy Theories night school class teacher, "Professor Professorson" in the episode "Conspiracy Theories and Interior Design". He later teaches Troy and Britta in an elective acting class and directs Troy in an all-black cast stage production of Fiddler on the Roof, entitled, "Fiddla Please". In "Introduction to Teaching", he teaches a two-day course called "Nicolas Cage: Good or Bad?" that Abed finds very difficult.

==== Prof. June Bauer ====
Prof. June Bauer (played by Betty White) is an anthropology professor at Greendale introduced in "Anthropology 101". Though very old, she's a surprisingly good fighter ("Anthropology 101"). Bauer has engaged in many worldly yet strange pursuits, such as hunting monkeys with a blowgun in the Amazon and drinking her urine for its health benefits. She is also not afraid of attacking her students, shooting a disrespectful Star-Burns with a blow gun and nearly killing Jeff with her weapon of nine weapons, after which she gets suspended from teaching. She then leaves Greendale to go to the Democratic Republic of the Congo.

==== Dr. Marshall Kane ====
Dr. Marshall Kane (played by Michael K. Williams) is the biology teacher at Greendale, noticeably more serious and intense than other professors. He just came off of a twenty-year prison sentence in which he completed his PhD and is baffled by some of how the world has since changed. He initially dislikes Jeff for his constant cell phone use and briefly kicks him out of his class. Unlike his peers, Dr. Kane often tries to veer away from some of the more ridiculous antics at the school. After some hesitation, he lets Jeff join his class after Star-Burns approaches him about starting a drug operation and is consequently kicked out. He resigns his job after the events of "Basic Lupine Urology", making the study group's Biology credits invalid. He also has a hard-line policy against accepting bribes, but only Jeff and Pierce know of this.

==== Prof. Noel Cornwallis ====
Prof. Noel Cornwallis (played by Malcolm McDowell) is Greendale's stern, manipulative history professor who teaches the group in the fourth season after having been fired from his long-term post at Oxford University because of a "slip-up with a co-ed". He is a descendant of Lord Charles Cornwallis. The Englishman is baffled by the school's eccentricities, dislikes the study group, and almost immediately regrets going to work at the school. It is revealed off-screen in "Intro to Felt Surrogacy" that he gave Annie the answers to a test in exchange for letting him rub her feet. He plays a very prominent role in "Intro to Knots" when he is tied up by Chang and the study group at a party at Jeff's apartment for supposedly giving them a failing grade on a group assignment. He narrowly misses out when his efforts to get the study group to turn on each other for a few better grades fails to break them, then admits he was not really tied up and simply stayed put because being "held hostage" was more enjoyable than his usual friendless and boring holidays, and decides to give the entire group mediocre passing grades.

=== Students ===
==== Alex "Star-Burns" Osbourne ====
Alex "Star-Burns" Osbourne (played by Dino Stamatopoulos) is a middle-aged student at Greendale known for his star-shaped sideburns as well as other quirks, such as wearing a top hat and owning a lizard later in the series. He takes several classes with the main characters, including Spanish and Boating. He is a music lover, and in particular likes the band Styx. Though Star-Burns is habitually laid back and sloppily dressed, he has a son who, in stark contrast to him, is incredibly businesslike. In "Intro to Political Science", he admits that he is a drug dealer. He worked in the school cafeteria until the events of "Contemporary American Poultry", when the group causes him to be fired for siphoning off chicken fingers—the most edible foodstuff served by the cafeteria—for his friends (afterward, though, they conspire to do the same thing for themselves). For the most part, however, he is disconnected from the group, and he sometimes seems confused as to who the individual members in the group are. He does, however, know who Jeff is. Though he enjoys the attention he receives because of his sideburns, he craves an identity beyond them. He begins wearing the aforementioned top hat at the beginning of the second season to draw attention away from them. He is assumed dead when a meth lab that he has been operating out of from his car's trunk explodes in the episode "Basic Lupine Urology". As per his wishes, his body was cremated. In the third-season finale, it is revealed that he faked his death and had been attempting to start a new identity. To this end, he is shown sporting a new haircut, albeit still with star-shaped sideburns. He returns in "Basic Intergluteal Numismatics", when he is found hiding in the stables, where he has lived while hiding, eating garbage, and trying to develop a "cat car". He ends up being accused of being the Greendale Ass-Crack Bandit, only for Jeff to find out this was a ruse by the Dean to deflect attention, in exchange for the Dean hiding Star-Burns' meth charges and allowing him to remain in the stables. In "Modern Espionage", Frankie interrogates him about the underground paintball game. Although he cooperates when she uses his real name, she permanently expels him from Greendale for participating in the paintball game.

==== Magnitude ====
Magnitude (played by Luke Youngblood), short for "Magnetic Attitude", is an British student at Greendale who is described as a "one-man party". His catchphrase is "Pop, pop!", which gains him laughter from his peers. While generally liked by faculty and staff, some dislike him, particularly Professor Marshall Kane ("Competitive Ecology"). In the episode "Intro to Political Science" Magnitude runs for the office of Student Body President. He is one of the final two candidates, opposing Leonard in "the political debate of the century", a debate consisting of Magnitude repeating his "Pop, pop!" catchphrase and Leonard blowing raspberries as a retort. When Dean Pelton and Annie take the "Pop, pop!" phrase away from him to give to a lazy potential student with rich parents in "Economics of Marine Biology", he is left broken and speechless. They're so horrified that they tell the student he cannot have Magnitude's catchphrase (though to everyone's surprise, that ends up leading him to enroll at Greendale because he's tired of having everything handed to him and never getting any better at anything). Magnitude happily declares, "POP, POP!"

Magnitude attended high school with Annie and Troy. It was revealed that Magnitude's use of "Pop, pop!" as a catchphrase began at the high school party where Annie had her mental breakdown because of two balloons popping right next to him ("Heroic Origins"). In season five ("Geothermal Escapism"), he admits that he is British (as Youngblood is in reality). He briefly appears in the season six episode "Intro to Recycled Cinema" as an extra in Abed's sci-fi film Raiders of the Galaxy.

==== Leonard Briggs ====
Leonard Briggs (alias Leonard Rodriguez, played by Richard Erdman) is an elderly man who is studying business at Greendale Community College and has been since the '70s. Leonard's old age is shown through a scratchy voice and many references to things like the Second World War. He and Jeff have a comically antagonistic relationship resulting in Jeff and other members of the study group to only say "Shut up, Leonard..." followed by a comment (for example, "Shut up, Leonard. No one knows what you're talking about."; "Shut up, Leonard. I talked to your son on Family Day. I know all about your gambling."). Though noticeably older than the other students at Greendale, he acts like a reckless, rebellious teen or young adult, often using slang and engaging in such activities as playing pranks and bass guitar and encountering "pregnancy scares". He leads a rowdy, disobedient band of elderly Greendale students called the "Hipsters" (because they all have hip replacements), with whom Pierce temporarily hangs out in "Messianic Myths and Ancient Peoples". He has children, though they are never seen on camera. In the season two finale, he claims to have been one of the Little Rascals, to have been in "a few real wars" that were less scary than the all-out paintball battle raging on campus, and to have been banned from the Denny's near the 15 exit. During "Intro to Political Science" he ran for the student presidency, using the surname "Rodriguez" in an attempt to court the Latino vote. It is revealed in multiple episodes from season 3 that Leonard still has the last name Rodriguez in a title card.

Leonard has a YouTube channel in which he reviews food products. One such video is shown in the closing scene to "Foosball and Nocturnal Vigilantism", where he declares Eugenio's Four Cheese Pizza to be "a buy". He does this again in the episode "Introduction to Finality" with a bag of potato chips he also likes. While Leonard briefly held valedictorian status in season 4, Dean Pelton (empowered by a pseudo-body-swap where he was acting and talking like Jeff Winger) learned that after earning an A in a rotary telephone repair course he took in 1968, Leonard simply made all of his subsequent classes Pass/Fail, taking him out of the running for a title now coming down to a showdown between Annie and Shirley ("Basic Human Anatomy").

In the season six episode "Ladders", it is revealed that Leonard has been a student at Greendale since it opened in the 1970s under the name "Greendale Computery College", in the episode "Pillows and Blankets" it was rumored that Leonard fought in the Korean War for the North Koreans, and in the episode "Intro to Political Science", his candidacy synopsis graphic reveals that he is a member of the Whig Party.

==== Vaughn Miller ====
Vaughn Miller (played by Eric Christian Olsen) is a usually shirtless, earth-friendly, mellow "neo-hippie" student who is the lead singer of a reggae rock band at Greendale Community College. A frequent hacky sack and Ultimate Frisbee player, he has had several notable interactions with the show's main characters, as he initially dated Britta and was in a band with Pierce. Though he at first seems very laid-back and peaceful, he started writing popular hate songs about Britta and Pierce after his relationships with them turned sour ("Home Economics"). However, he and Annie began a relationship, much to the bemusement of Jeff, Britta, and Troy and later, Shirley. At the end of the first season, he transfers to a community college in Delaware because of their strong hacky-sack athletic program. Annie initially decided to join him there before changing her mind. He was the cause of the bond between Jeff and Shirley in the first season due to his small nipples, which Shirley finds hilarious. They also reference this in season 3.

==== Rich Stephenson ====
Rich Stephenson (played by Greg Cromer) is a student who is in Jeff's pottery class, of whom Jeff grows jealous for his sculpting skills ("Beginner Pottery"). A doctor who is friendly and well-liked by everyone stands in stark contrast to Jeff, who tries to catch him as a ringer. Nicknamed "Doc Potterywood" by Jeff, it is implied that Jeff may actually have been right, and Rich had secretly taken previous pottery classes at different colleges. It is hinted at the end of "Beginner Pottery" that his mother's relationship is extremely strained. Rich had a brother who died in a roller-coaster accident ("Beginner Pottery"). He spends time with the study group again in "Epidemiology", when he attempts to treat the infected students while dressed as a banana and causes Jeff to admit his hatred for him openly. After spending winter break volunteering with Annie, he joins Duncan's anthropology class and unsuccessfully competes against Chang for a spot in the study group. When he turns down a date with Annie due to her youth, Jeff begins to admire his ethics and seeks life advice from him, although he wants to abuse the power Rich gets from everyone loving him.

==== 'Fat' Neil ====
'Fat' Neil (played by Charley Koontz) is a student ostracized for being fat. He was first introduced in the episode "Asian Population Studies". Jeff, who accidentally coined the name "Fat Neil" ("Advanced Dungeons & Dragons"), attempts to make it up to him after he thinks Neil is considering suicide. Jeff organizes a Dungeons & Dragons game with the study group (without Pierce) where Neil, a huge D&D fan, will save the day. Though Pierce attempts to sabotage the event and mocks Neil, Neil still regains his confidence after winning the game. It is implied in "Applied Anthropology and Culinary Arts" that he and Vicki have feelings for each other. Though his fate after the D&D game seemed unsure, Neil later emerged in "Pillows and Blankets" as the DJ for Greendale's campus radio station, calling himself "Real Neal". As revealed in "Basic Lupine Urology", he and Vicki have, at some point, begun dating. In season 5, Neil is shown to be friendly with the group, and Jeff expresses pride at the fact that the group saved his life so that he could return to "doing stuff in the background". In the season 6 episode "Basic Email Security", the group force Neil to sit through the performance of a comedian who makes offensive jokes about his weight, and as a result, Neil decides never to speak to the group again.

==== Garrett Lambert ====
Garrett Xander Lambert (played by Erik Charles Nielsen) is a nerdy and out-of-shape student at Greendale with a frighteningly screechy and anxious-sounding way of speaking. He takes several classes with some of the main cast. There have been several student-led movements to "save" Garrett. However, he has no apparent illnesses, and Jeff and Annie have been left wondering if those savior plans worked or not ("Digital Exploration of Interior Design"). His middle name is Xander in the credits for Abed's documentary in the season 4 episode "Advanced Documentary Filmmaking". In the season 6 episode "Wedding Videography", Garrett is married to classmate Stacy (Erin McGathy). Although she turns out to be his cousin, Chang convinces them to remain married.

==== Todd Jacobson ====
Todd Jacobson (David Neher) is a student at Greendale who takes biology with the study group in "Competitive Ecology". Forgiving and good-natured, he responds to insults with "None taken". The group picks on him after he is paired with Pierce on a class project and inadvertently upsets the group's natural balance. He eventually explodes at the study group, calling their love for each other "weird" and "toxic" and ending with "Offense taken". Todd is a married Iraq War veteran who has a newborn daughter. Todd also states that he needs insulin shots. He also appears in "Basic Lupine Urology", in which he is accused of destroying the study group's biology project. Todd's relationship with the group is more amicable in season 6, wherein he works at Shirley's Sandwiches ("Ladders"), participates in the underground paintball game ("Modern Espionage"), and even officiates Garrett's wedding ("Wedding Videography"), during which he muses that he "could be God".

==== Rachel ====
Rachel (Brie Larson) is a cute, quirky girl that Abed meets while on a date with two other girls at a school dance ("Herstory of Dance"). The two connect, although Rachel would only return a season later, on "Analysis of Cork-Based Networking", when they go on a date. She makes another appearance when she is Abed's girlfriend in "VCR Maintenance and Educational Publishing". She enjoys running coat-checks at college events, volunteering to do so during "Herstory of Dance" and starting one without permission in "Analysis of Cork-Based Networking". In the season six premiere "Ladders", Abed, about the fact that Brie Larson's film career keeps her from making frequent appearances on the show, comments that anyone observing the narrative of the study group may have questions such as "What happened to that girl I'm dating?"

==== Other recurring students ====
- Eric Wisniewski (Bill Parks) is a football player at Greendale with red hair and beard. He appears in a number of episodes including "For a Few Paintballs More" before getting shot down by City College paintball soldiers.
- Pavel Iwaszkiewicz (Dominik Musiol) is a Polish exchange student, and a hallmate of Abed, serving—among other things—as his directing assistant.
- Vicki Cooper (Danielle Kaplowitz) is a Dance Major at Greendale who is continually ignored by her peers. In season 2, it is implied she and "Fat Neil" have feelings for each other; they start dating in season 3 ("Basic Lupine Urology"). Pierce has a continued hatred for her ever since she refused to lend him a pencil.
- Mark Millot (DC Pierson) is a journalist for the student newspaper, the Greendale Gazette-Journal ("Investigative Journalism") and a cofounder of the college sketch group the Greendale Goofaws, which also include Linda Greene (Meggie McFadden), Buzz Foster (Dominic Dierkes) and Derrick Bideos (Dan Eckman). In real life, actors Pierson, McFadden, Dierkes, and Eckman form the comedy group Derrick Comedy, with former Community regular Donald Glover as the fifth member.
- Quendra (Marcy McCusker) is a student at Greendale whom Jeff brings to a mixer to keep Rich from being voted into the study group in "Asian Population Studies". Her personality is that of a flirty air-headed student who has a penchant for spelling words with "Qu" where a "K" sound would typically be, which explains her name. She also appears in "For a Few Paintballs More". In "Basic Lupine Urology", Star-Burns attempts to use her as a "make-out decoy". She is mentioned in the fourth-season episode "Intro to Knots" when Annie tells the group that she'd learned from Quendra that they were receiving a failing grade from Professor Cornwallis, for whom Quendra did "assistant work". Upon hearing of Quendra's connection to Cornwallis, Shirley replies sarcastically, alluding to Cornwallis' history with female students.
- Annie Kim (Irene Choi) is Annie's chief academic rival at Greendale. The study group often refers to her as "Other Annie" or "Asian Annie". Intelligent and extremely competitive, she copies Annie's idea of a Greendale Model United Nations Team ("Geography of Global Conflict"), and later appears as a rival to the group in other school events. In Queer Studies and Advanced Waxing, she took over Annie's role as Daniel LaRusso in a play adaptation of The Karate Kid.
- Harry Jefferson (Wil Garret) is an elderly, blind man. He appears in "Digital Exploration of Interior Design" and "Basic Lupine Urology". He has a short monologue in "Pillows and Blankets" where he states, "Well, I guess all hugs have to come to an end."
- Dave (Darsan Solomon) is a student in Jeff's Law class. In the sixth finale, "Emotional Consequences of Broadcast Television", he appears in Jeff's vision of what will happen if all of his friends leave Greendale (essentially, Jeff will be left with the supporting cast).

=== Staff ===
==== Robert Laybourne ====
Vice Dean Robert Laybourne (John Goodman) is head of Greendale's air conditioner repair annex and the real power behind Greendale, as revealed in "Biology 101". When Dean Pelton decides to confront Laybourne over the annex purchasing an espresso machine, Laybourne shows him that the air conditioning annex is the primary source of Greendale's funding. He thus holds complete power over the dean's office. Later, upon learning Troy's plumbing abilities, Laybourne tries to recruit him to the air conditioner annex. He instigates a pillow war between Abed and Troy, hoping to divide their friendship and motivate Troy to enroll in the air conditioning repair school. Murray later kills him, something which is revealed to the air conditioner repair school by Troy in "Introduction to Finality".

==== Jerry ====
Jerry (Jerry Minor) is the head janitor at Greendale. After he witnesses Troy's supreme innate plumbing abilities, he makes several attempts to convince him to become a plumber ("English as a Second Language"), which he regards as a noble profession. While attempting to recruit him, he later warns him against becoming an air-conditioning repairman, calling the air-conditioning men "elitists". He has appeared several times since, often in a cranky mood when the study group asks him to find or fix things in the school.

==== Crazy Schmidt ====
Crazy Schmidt (Eddie Pepitone) is a janitor at Greendale, who is best known for his odd, erratic temperament.

==== Murray ====
Murray the AC Repairman (Dan Bakkedahl) is a member of the Greendale Air Conditioning Repair Annex. He kills Vice Dean Laybourne, briefly becoming the new Vice Dean before being exposed by Troy, who is revealed as the "truest repairman".

==== Sgt. Nuñez ====
Sgt. Nuñez (Mel Rodriguez) is the chief of campus security for Greendale College. All of Nuñez's officers quit when Dean Pelton informs them that the college no longer has funds to pay them, and they can only be reimbursed in-class credits. Nuñez stays because he needs SCUBA certification, and Chang becomes his new underling. He eventually quits after Dean Pelton sides with Chang.

==== Carl and Richie ====
Carl Bladt (Jeremy Scott Johnson) and Richie Countee (Brady Novak) are two inept, often drunk members of Greendale's board of directors. Though they are generally laid-back and friendly, they have repeatedly lowered school standards and fail to realize when Chang replaces the Dean. They hate the school and later sell it briefly to Subway Sandwiches. Richie also believes that he can read people's minds.

=== Other ===
==== The Greendale Human Being ====
The Greendale Human Being is the "ethnically neutral" school mascot created and designed by Pierce and Dean Pelton in "Football, Feminism and You". Though intended to embody a spirit of inclusivity and to avoid derogatory stereotypes, its featureless appearance is distinctly uncanny, like a neutral gray gimp or zentai performer. It appears in several different events and initiatives sponsored by the Dean as the school's mascot. Fumes from the magic marker used on its costume have been known to make it unusually aggressive. It has been seen with both female and child versions of itself. Items have been added to the costume, such as angel wings for Valentine's Day and icicles in "Regional Holiday Music", which the students say only make it look creepier. In an episode of Dean Pelton's Office Hours, a series of mini-episodes featuring the Dean reveals that at least one of the mascots is played by a woman.

==== Andre Bennett ====
Andre Bennett (Malcolm-Jamal Warner) is Shirley's ex-husband and a store manager. In 2008 he cheated on Shirley with a stripper named Mysti, and they separated and divorced during the first season. He becomes her boyfriend again after learning of her pregnancy; he remains loyal to her even after discovering that Chang could be the father ("Asian Population Studies"). It ultimately turns out that the baby is Andre's, and he remarries Shirley in the middle of the third season. During the fifth-season premiere, "Repilot", Shirley reveals that Andre has once again left her and has taken the kids with him, as she put too much focus on her sandwich shop at Greendale, inadvertently neglecting her family.

==== Alan Connor ====
Alan Connor (Rob Corddry) is a lawyer and former colleague of Jeff's who attends Narcotics Anonymous sessions at Greendale, where he had once met Annie. Though he does not admit it to Jeff after they meet again in "Accounting for Lawyers", the study group knows that he had sent an email message to his law firm exposing Jeff's credentials, which got him fired. Alan returns in "Introduction to Finality", working as Pierce's lawyer in a court case between Pierce and Shirley for ownership of a sandwich shop in the cafeteria. Alan reveals that he now heads the law firm that Jeff worked at and threatens Jeff to drop the case or not come back to work at the law firm. After an inspirational Winger speech, Pierce fires Alan, and Alan reveals that he did send the e-mail that got Jeff disbarred, for which Jeff thanks him. He appears again in "Repilot" when he tries to convince Jeff to help him launch a major lawsuit against Greendale, which Jeff ultimately rejects.

==== Gobi Nadir ====
Gobi Nadir (Iqbal Theba) is Abed's father, with whom Abed has a somewhat complicated relationship. While Mr. Nadir wants Abed to take over the family's falafel restaurant, Abed plans to become a film director. Abed also thinks Gobi blames him for his mother leaving them. Gobi is a very protective yet argumentative father, but he learns to accept that his son needs filmmaking to express himself. Gobi appears on Family Day and disapproves of the more lenient way in which Shirley raises her boys. He is equally controlling of his niece Abra.

==== Officer Cackowski ====
Officer Cackowski (Craig Cackowski) is a local police officer, repeatedly visiting Greendale in the line of duty. He initially appeared as a member of campus security before inexplicably becoming a police officer. He seems to be friends with Professor Sean Garrity, referring to him by his given name. He appears in "The Science of Illusion" to investigate a body Britta drops out of the biology labs; in "Conspiracy Theories and Interior Design", he teaches Jeff and Annie the dangers of fake gun shootouts. He later returns in season 3 to investigate Troy and Abed's landlord in "Foosball and Nocturnal Vigilantism", and in "Curriculum Unavailable" to assign Abed to a psychologist for sneaking onto Greendale Campus to investigate the Dean's Doppelganger Chang has in control. Cackowski returns in the season 6 episode "Basic Email Security" to help investigate a hacking attempt on the school, treating the group as old friends and acting surprised that they want to keep a cop they've known for five years "at arm's length". In that episode, he appoints a child named Warburton to run his department's cybercrime division, although Warburton catches his friend Ryan as the culprit at the end of the episode. In "Grifting 101", it is revealed that he is taking a class at Greendale.

==== Steven Spreck ====
Dean Steven Spreck (Jordan Black) is the dean of rival City College, who makes several subversive efforts to shut Greendale down, including the instigation of an all-out paintball war on Greendale's campus. Like Dean Pelton, he seems to have an ambiguous sexuality. He appears briefly during a montage at the end of season three, apparently forming another plot. In the season 4 episode "Heroic Origins", it is revealed that he is working with Chang to sabotage Greendale and has blueprints for a giant mechanical spider. Spreck's last-ditch effort to harm Greendale occurs in the season 6 episode "Basic Crisis Room Decorum" – although Spreck himself does not appear, City College runs an attack ad that defames Greendale by claiming that it gave a degree to a dog. Jeff and the group foil City College again by releasing their ad, which instead of attacking Spreck back, provides an honest commentary on how Greendale needs to "get its shit together". Spreck and City College do not appear again in the series. However, they are briefly suspected of hiring a ringer to destroy Greendale in the underground paintball game in "Modern Espionage".

==== Gilbert Lawson ====
Gilbert Lawson (Giancarlo Esposito) is Cornelius Hawthorne's assistant, executor of the estate, and illegitimate son (thus Pierce's half-brother). According to Cornelius' will, he has Pierce and the study group play "Journey to the Center of Hawkthorne" to claim his inheritance. He repeatedly cheats to "win" the game. Still, when Cornelius's video avatar orders him to agree that he is not Cornelius' biological son after all (to maintain Cornelius' insistence that the Hawthorne family is entirely Caucasian), he refuses to do so. Cornelius turns on Gilbert, who then joins forces with the study group to destroy Cornelius and win the game for real. Sympathetic to his story of disgusting and racist treatment by Cornelius, Pierce and the group allow Gilbert to claim the inheritance in the episode "Digital Estate Planning". He later becomes Pierce's roommate in his mansion. In "Intro to Knots", Annie mentions that Gilbert was giving Pierce sensitivity training, including by watching the film Invictus.

==== Annie's Boobs ====
Annie's Boobs (Crystal) is Troy's pet capuchin monkey. Annie's Boobs was reportedly named by a competition held via the monkey's personal Twitter account. Troy maintains that the account belongs to Annie's Boobs, and thus cannot legitimately change the monkey's name, despite Annie's protestations. It also hates the caviar Abed buys for it. Since Annie's Boobs was set free by Abed, it has spent its time collecting items owned by the study group and storing them in a nearby air vent. Its first appearance was in the season one episode "Contemporary American Poultry".

==== Faux-by ====
Faux-by (J. P. Manoux) is an underemployed Moby impersonator that Chang hires to impersonate and replace the Dean after he takes over the school.

== Guest characters ==
- Nurse Jackie (Patton Oswalt in "Home Economics" and "The Psychology of Letting Go") is the school nurse at Greendale. He considers himself the Hawkeye of Greendale.
- Cornelius Hawthorne (Joe Fria in "Celebrity Pharmacology" and Larry Cedar in "Advanced Gay" and "Digital Estate Planning") is Pierce's overbearing father. Cornelius is a strong racist, homophobe, and classist, holding prejudices and stereotypes about almost all ethnic groups including Swedes and Welsh. Cornelius wears a toupee made carved from ivory to avoid hair coming from "orientals". He chastises Pierce for having Jewish and African-American friends and marketing Hawthorne Wipes to the LGBT community. He dies of a heart attack after Jeff tells him he's both a lousy father and a dinosaur who knows the entire world (including his son) hates him and has no more use for him. Cornelius is seen as embarrassed by his son Pierce even from a young age, refusing to have him on his television commercial after he failed his audition. Cornelius strongly resembles Colonel Harland Sanders, the founder and spokesman of Kentucky Fried Chicken. This is why in "Basic Rocket Science" Pierce goes crazy as the Colonel taunts him.
- Jeremy Simmons (Aaron Himelstein in "Debate 109") is a student at neighboring City College, who is the primary rival of Greendale's debate team.
- Doreen (Sharon Lawrence in "The Politics of Human Sexuality") is an escort that Pierce meets in his marketing class and later gets into a relationship with. After she dumps him during a Greendale school dance, he borrows money to pay for her company.
- Mike Chilada (Anthony Michael Hall in "Comparative Religion") is a bully at Greendale who gets into a big brawl with the study group before Christmas. He reappears briefly at the beginning of "A Fistful of Paintballs" chasing Fat Neil.
- Buddy Austin (Jack Black in "Investigative Journalism") is a student at Greendale, who, while no one ever noticed him, was a member of the study group's Spanish class taught by Señor Chang. He desperately wants to join the study group, and despite his irritating behavior, is eventually accepted. However, he joins a cooler study group that includes Star-Burns and is led by Owen Wilson in a cameo when he finds out they voted him in.
- Madame LeClair (Twink Caplan in "Interpretive Dance") is the ballet professor at Greendale.
- Coach Herbert Bogner (Blake Clark in "Physical Education") is a physical-education coach who teaches billiards at Greendale. He comes into conflict with Jeff, who refuses to wear the Greendale regulation gym shorts when playing pool, and the two face off in a billiards match which ends in the nude.
- Rabbi Chang (Tom Yi in "Basic Genealogy") is Señor Chang's older, critical brother with much-unresolved history between them. Rabbi Chang is blind to the surface incongruity of his being a Rabbi but chides Señor Chang to drop his Spanish act. As much as these two brothers might seem to be at odds, Señor Chang does leap to his brother's aid and fights in his honor when Pierce obliviously harasses Rabbi Chang during a game of Pictionary. After Señor Chang is fired, Rabbi Chang helps him by getting him jobs as a security guard at ceremonies he officiates.
- Amber (Katharine McPhee in "Basic Genealogy") is one of Pierce's thirty-two ex-stepchildren, who pretends to like him and comes to Family Day since he sends her significant sums of money. She and Jeff share a mutual attraction, and the two prepare to have sex until Jeff learns how she is exploiting Pierce.
- Nana Barnes (Fran Bennett in "Basic Genealogy") is Troy's grandmother, whom he fears and avoids. Britta argues that the elderly should be cherished and respected, but Nana is incensed by being called old and insists on spanking Britta with a switch.
- Abra (Emily Ghamrawi in "Basic Genealogy") is Abed's cousin who wears a concealing burqa. Against her uncle Gobi's demands, she sneaks away to take off her burqa and have fun on family day at Greendale, but Shirley helps her sneak back unnoticed.
- Prof. Marion Holly (Tony Hale in "Beginner Pottery") is the pottery professor at Greendale. While his class seems very easy and passable, he has a zero-tolerance policy for students who make joking reference to the pottery scene from the 1990 film Ghost (which he calls "Ghosting") and thus comes into conflict with Jeff. He has a habit of calling the students in his class "my blueberries".
- Admiral Lee Slaughter (Lee Majors in "Beginner Pottery") is the stern teacher of boating at Greendale who runs his classes on a sailboat in the school's parking lot.
- Ted (Drew Carey in "Accounting for Lawyers") is Jeff's former boss. He started up Hamish, Hamish & Hamlin's law firm so that he could have people around him who would not inquire about the mysterious hole in his right hand. He and Jeff have a good relationship, as evidenced by his offering Jeff a consulting position at the firm while Jeff is still a student at Greendale. In "Introduction to Finality", Alan Connor claims that Ted has died (having been eaten by sharks) and that Alan is now the firm's head, but this is not confirmed.
- Meghan (Hilary Duff in "Aerodynamics of Gender") is the leader of a group of "mean girls" at Greendale, who come into conflict with Britta, Annie, Shirley, and Abed.
- Joshua (Matt Walsh in "Aerodynamics of Gender") is a groundskeeper at Greendale who secretly has a giant trampoline on campus that gives people a spiritual calm when they jump on it. Though he reluctantly lets Jeff and Troy know about it and jump on it, he is fired when Pierce tells the rest of the school after breaking his legs. It turns out that he is staunchly racist.
- LeVar Burton appears as himself in "Intermediate Documentary Filmmaking" when Pierce hires him to meet Troy. Despite looking up to Burton as a role model, the latter had hoped to never meet him in person for fear of disappointing him. LeVar also helps Britta realize that she is a good friend but very bad with money. In "Geothermal Escapism", he accompanies Troy during his voyage around the world, though in "Analysis of Cork-Based Networking" it is revealed that pirates captured them.
- Paige (Brit Marling in "Early 21st-Century Romanticism") is a student at Greendale befriended by Britta. Britta believes that Paige is a lesbian and uses her friendship with Paige to show her open-mindedness. Annie learns from Paige's friend that Paige is heterosexual and interested in Britta for mainly the same reasons Britta is interested in her. Britta and Paige eventually realize that neither of them is a lesbian and have a falling-out.
- Special Agent Robin Vohlers (Eliza Coupe in "Intro to Political Science") is an emotionless Secret Service agent, who scouts out Greendale in preparation for Vice President Joe Biden's arrival. She meets and is intrigued by Abed, with whom she has several similarities. The two seem to develop feelings for each other enough for Vohlers to try to make him a threat to national security so she can spend more time around him, while Abed claims he can make napalm out of dish soap and cat food on television so she can observe him. They end up having a "date" watching Kickpuncher with Vohlers watching through binoculars from her van in the parking lot after bugging Abed's room.
- Prof. Peter Sheffield (Stephen Tobolowsky in "Competitive Wine Tasting") is a professor at Greendale who ignites an academic rivalry with Abed. He is the author of Who Indeed? and What Was Happening?, critical analyses of the television series Who's the Boss? and What's Happening!!. Like Dr Duncan, his academic theories and pride are eventually shattered by Abed's exceptional abilities.
- Lukka (Enver Gjokaj in "Custody Law and Eastern European Diplomacy") is a fellow student who befriends Abed and Troy, dates Britta, and turns out to be a war criminal.
- The Black Rider (Josh Holloway in "A Fistful of Paintballs") is a mysterious professional paintball assassin hired by City College to win the paintball contest at the end of season two. He takes an online course at Greendale and draws Jeff's ire, who feels insecure around him because of his good looks. After getting the drop on the study group in paintball, he is fooled into lowering his guard by Pierce's fake heart attack and eliminated from the game.
- Professor Cligoris (Martin Starr in "Geography of Global Conflict") is a history teacher at Greendale who helps Annie found the school's chapter of Model United Nations. He is obsessed with the history of the Model UN.
- Luis Guzmán is the most famous alumnus of Greendale, and appears as himself in the episode "Documentary Filmmaking: Redux" to help film the college's new TV ad. Previously, the Dean had commissioned a statue of him for Greendale's campus in "Advanced Criminal Law". As the study group, Guzmán acknowledges Greendale Community College's inferiority but holds it dear because of the good times he had there (His good times there related to him getting "laid like crazy").
- Juergen (Nick Kroll in "Foosball and Nocturnal Vigilantism") is the leader of a gang of German exchange students at Greendale who best Jeff at foosball.
- Prof. Cory Radison (Taran Killam in "Regional Holiday Music") is the seemingly cheery, yet deceptively intense glee club instructor at Greendale. When the current glee club suffers a nervous breakdown, he recruits the study group to replace them for the holiday pageant. They ultimately agree, but he leaves the school once it is revealed that he caused the bus crash that killed the previous club. In keeping with the Glee parody, he often goes by "Mr. Rad".
- Vinnie (French Stewart in "Celebrity Impressionists") is the manager of The Doppel Gang, a company that rents out celebrity impersonators, who used to impersonate French Stewart himself. After Abed goes into debt after using the service too much, Vinnie makes the group work for him at a bar mitzvah.
- Subway (Travis Schuldt in "Digital Exploration of Interior Design" (Part 1)) is a man hired by Subway to attend Greendale so that they could open a branch there. Having legally changed his name from Rick, he breaks company rules when he falls in love with Britta, and the company consequently replaces him. He is also symbolic of Britta's theory that modern corporations are "taking human form". He reappears in the episode "Advanced Safety Features", this time representing Honda in a guerrilla marketing campaign.
- Blade (Kirk Fox in "Origins of Vampire Mythology") Britta's nonchalant ex-boyfriend who works at a carnival. Jeff grows jealous of his inexplicable magnetism.
- Dr. Heidi (John Hodgman in "Curriculum Unavailable") a fake psychiatrist hired by Chang to keep the Study Group away from the school.
- Professor Albrecht (David St. James in "Curriculum Unavailable" and "Ladders") a professor who teaches a class about ladders at Greendale.
- Alter-Pierce is a sitcom version of Pierce played by actor Fred Willard in Abed's four-camera fantasies in "History 101".
- Toby Weeks (Matt Lucas in "Conventions of Space and Time") is the world's biggest Inspector Spacetime fan. He tries to kidnap Abed at a convention before being stopped by Troy.
- George and Deb Perry (Martin Mull and Lesley Ann Warren in "Lawnmower Maintenance & Postnatal Care" and "Advanced Safety Features) are Britta's parents, who are shown to have had a much closer relationship to the rest of the group than she has had herself.
- Reinhold (Chris Diamantopoulos in "Alternate History of the German Invasion") is Juergen's brother who seeks revenge on the study group by repeatedly reserving their study room table before they can.
- Karl (Alex Schemmer in "Foosball and Nocturnal Vigilantism" and "Alternate History of the German Invasion") is a member of the group of German students. He becomes Abed's friend after it is revealed he has a character named "Dr. Blitz" who saved Abed's character "Spacetimer 8032" in the on-line game Spawncraft. He loves blutwurst.
- Lukas (Alex Klein in "Foosball and Nocturnal Vigilantism" and "Alternate History of the German Invasion") is a member of the group of German students. He loves luft balloons.
- William Winger, Sr. (James Brolin in "Cooperative Escapism in Familial Relations") is Jeff's estranged father, who abandoned his mother and him when he was still a child. William's departure is responsible for many of Jeff's emotional problems and, for much of the series, Jeff has struggled about whether or not he should contact him. They ultimately spend Thanksgiving together during the fourth season, when it is revealed that William is a bold, emotionally distant reflection of Jeff from earlier in the series. After some hesitancy, Jeff ultimately confronts William about how his departure hurt him.
- William Winger, Jr. (Adam DeVine in "Cooperative Escapism in Familial Relations") is Jeff's half-brother, whom he did not know existed until the fourth season. A juvenile, emotional man caught in a state of arrested development. He was raised alone by his unloving father after his mother died and continues to live at home.
- Archie DeCoste (Zack Pearlman in "Economics of Marine Biology") is a spoiled stoner from a wealthy family that the Dean tries to lure to Greendale as a "whale".
- Coach Jason Chapman (Ian Roberts in "Economics of Marine Biology") is a self-serious PE instructor at Greendale who teaches Troy and Shirley in his "P.E.E." class.
- Balloon Guide (Sara Bareilles in "Intro to Felt Surrogacy") the operator of the hot air balloon that the study group crashes.
- Mountain Man (Jason Alexander in "Intro to Felt Surrogacy") is a friendly yet mysterious Greendale alumnus who lives in the woods. The study group runs into him when they crash a hot air balloon into the wilderness.
- Mark (Joe Lo Truglio in "Heroic Origins" and "Advanced Introduction to Finality") is one of Jeff's former partners from his former law firm, where he went by the nickname "Cash" to Jeff's "Tango". In "Advanced Introduction to Finality", he offers Jeff a partnership at his law firm, claiming that Jeff is still a great lawyer. Jeff later declines Mark's offer, instead opting to search for another firm closer to Greendale so he can remain close to the Study Group.
- Mr. Stone (Walton Goggins in "Cooperative Polygraphy") is a seemingly stoic man hired by Pierce to administer a polygraph test to the study group. When Dan Harmon hosted a table reading for the episode, Mr. Stone was played by Pedro Pascal.
- Bob Waite (Nathan Fillion in "Analysis of Cork-Based Networking" and "Ladders") is the head custodian at Greendale. Though a slick politician, one of his primary concerns is his difficulty getting access to online pornography on campus.
- Lapari (Kumail Nanjiani in "Analysis of Cork-Based Networking" and "Modern Espionage") is the deputy custodian at Greendale. After making a brief appearance initially, he returns more prominently when he secretly works with City College to orchestrate a paintball assassin game on Greendale's campus.
- Debra Chambers (Paget Brewster in "Analysis of Cork-Based Networking") is the head of the IT department at Greendale.
- Waldron (Robert Patrick in "Analysis of Cork-Based Networking") is the head of the Parking department at Greendale.
- Carol (Katie Leclerc in "Analysis of Cork-Based Networking") is a deaf student at Greendale. She befriends Abed, but it is later revealed that Britta had paid her to befriend Abed and then spoil one of his favorite shows called Bloodlines of Conquest, as revenge for when Abed spoiled the same show for Britta.
- Koogler (Mitchell Hurwitz in "App Development and Condiments" and "Modern Espionage") is a middle-aged party animal student at Greendale, whose antics are reminiscent of those in Caddyshack and Animal House. His popularity and lifestyle are incongruous with his age.
- Devon (Vince Gilligan in "VCR Maintenance and Educational Publishing") is a struggling actor and host of the VCR videogame Pile of Bullets.
- Hank Hickey (David Cross in "Advanced Advanced Dungeons & Dragons") is Buzz Hickey's estranged son. He is an experienced Dungeons & Dragons player.
- Ronald Mohammed (Michael McDonald in "Basic Story") is an eccentric insurance appraisal officer who evaluates the value of Greendale as a property. This leads to the school being sold to Subway Sandwiches.
- Russell Borchert (Chris Elliott in "Basic Sandwich") was the first dean of Greendale and a mad-genius computer professor. He has been secretly living under Greendale with a robot girlfriend for decades. Borchert Hall is the location of Greendale's swimming pool.
- Prof. Roger DeSalvo (Matt Berry in "Grifting 101") is a self-styled grifter who teaches a course in grifting at Greendale, which is itself a grift. Dean Pelton fires him after attempting to con Greendale out of $50,000 for fake injuries.
- Stacy (Erin McGathy in "Wedding Videography") the girl who Garrett proposes to and marries who later turns out to be his cousin. However, Chang encourages them to stay married despite the challenges they will face, which they agree to do.
- Briggs Hatton (Matt Gourley in "Wedding Videography") a fictional person who explains to the audience that he has been researching incest and finds state laws on the topic inconsistent and outdated. He reveals that the show's writers allowed him to address the topic only if he identified himself as the writer at the end of the episode.
- Ice Cube Head (voiced by Justin Roiland in "Emotional Consequences of Broadcast Television") is an imaginary member of the Activities Committee who appears in Chang's vision of a possible season seven. He is an animated character with a giant ice cube for a head, has magical powers, and eats cell phones.
- Scrunch (Seth Green in "Emotional Consequences of Broadcast Television") is an imaginary member of the Activities Committee. He appears in Jeff's vision of how difficult his life at Greendale will be if all of his friends leave. Scrunch insists that Jeff's job is to do all the work, while the rest of the group's job is to "party".

== Fictional characters within Community ==
=== Inspector Spacetime ===
Inspector Spacetime (Travis Richey) is the protagonist in a British science-fiction television program called Inspector Spacetime that has been on the air for fifty years and has many similarities to Doctor Who (both are British science-fiction television programs that have been running for approximately fifty years). With his sidekick (similar to that of a companion in Doctor Who) Constable Reggie, he travels through space and time in a TARDIS-like red telephone box while fighting creatures such as "Blorgons", which are similar to Daleks. Troy and Abed become major fans starting in the third season and often impersonate Reggie and the Inspector.

=== Constable Reggie ===
Constable Reggie (Derwin Reggie) is the secondary character in Inspector Spacetime, who acts as the Inspector's sidekick. Unlike the Inspector, who is an alien, Reggie is human.

=== Kickpuncher ===
Kickpuncher (Derek Mears), whose punches have the strength of kicks, is the titular hero in a series of cheesy action movies that Troy and Abed like to ridicule while still being fans. He is a cybernetically enhanced police officer, reminiscent of RoboCop. His first name is David. Among his nemeses, according to an ending tag in which Troy pretends to be Kickpuncher, is Punchkicker (portrayed by Abed).

=== The Helicopter Pilot ===
The Helicopter Pilot (Andy Dick) is a tiny man that Pierce hallucinates when he takes his painkillers after breaking his legs on the trampoline in "Aerodynamics of Gender". He first appears piloting Pierce's drone and urging him to ignore the dosage recommendations on his medication. He often gives Pierce bad advice, influencing him into a painkiller addiction and overdose in "Early 21st Century Romanticism".

=== Evil Abed ===
Evil Abed (Danny Pudi) is (implied to be) a figment of Abed's imagination who torments Abed as his nemesis. Identical to Abed except for an evil-looking felt beard, he is originally from the darkest timeline in the episode "Remedial Chaos Theory" and makes a return appearance in the episode "Contemporary Impressionists". He returns to seek revenge against Abed and the study group in the season 3 finale "Introduction to Finality". He also appears in "Advanced Introduction to Finality" revealing he has given up on being evil. His beard mimics that worn by "Mirror Spock" in the classic Star Trek episode "Mirror, Mirror".

=== The Evil Study Group ===
Alongside Evil Abed, there is a darkest timeline version of the study group consisting of Evil Jeff (Joel McHale); who lost an arm to severe burns, Evil Annie (Alison Brie); whose guilt over seemingly causing Evil Pierce's death drove her insane and resulted in her being committed to an asylum, Evil Troy (Donald Glover); who destroyed his larynx while trying to eat a burning troll doll, Evil Shirley (Yvette Nicole Brown); who became an alcoholic after Evil Pierce's supposed death, Evil Pierce (Chevy Chase); who lost a leg due to Evil Annie accidentally shooting him and then faked his death to get back at the Evil Study Group, and Evil Britta (Gillian Jacobs); who has a blue streak in her hair, all appearing in "Remedial Chaos Theory". In "Intro to Knots", Evil Jeff frees Evil Annie from Greendale insane asylum and informs her of a plan to attack the "Prime Timeline". In "Advanced Introduction to Finality", Jeff imagines a scenario where the Evil Study Group, cross over to the "Prime Timeline" in an attempt to sow dissension in the study group.

=== Dopple-deaner and Evil Chang ===
Dopple-deaner (J. P. Manoux) and Evil Chang (Ken Jeong) are Dean Pelton and Ben Chang’s darkest timeline counterparts who appear briefly in the season 4 finale "Advanced Introduction to Finality".

== Webisode characters ==
- Dr. Pat Isakson (Dan Harmon in "The Five A's of Greendale") is Greendale's awkward, short-tempered dean of admissions and professor of women's studies. The mustachioed man stars in a series of Greendale admissions videos.
- Brody Leitz (Randall Park in "The Five A's of Greendale") is Greendale's student body president. Park later appears in the sixth season of the show as himself.
