= Basic Genealogy =

- Community episode
- Episode no.: Season 1 Episode 18
- Directed by: Ken Whittingham
- Written by: Karey Dornetto
- Production code: 117
- Original air date: March 11, 2010

Guest appearances
- Jim Rash as Dean Craig Pelton; Lauren Stamile as Professor Michelle Slater; Iqbal Theba as Gobi Nadir; Kwesi Boakye as Elijah; Fran Bennett as Troy's nana; Katharine McPhee as Amber; Craig Cackowski as Officer Cackowski; Tyrel Jackson Williams as Jordan; Dino Stamatopoulos as Star-Burns; Richard Erdman as Leonard

Episode chronology
| ← Previous "Physical Education" | Next → "Beginner Pottery" |
- Community season 1

"Basic Genealogy" is the eighteenth episode of the first season of the American comedy television series Community. It aired in the United States on NBC on March 11, 2010.

== Plot ==
During Family Day at Greendale, Pierce (Chevy Chase) tries to re-connect with his step-daughter Amber (guest star Katharine McPhee) who becomes attracted to Jeff (Joel McHale). Britta (Gillian Jacobs) gets spanked with a switch (beating stick) by Troy's Nana (Fran Bennett) and Shirley's sons cause havoc for Abed's father (Iqbal Theba). In the end tag, Troy (Donald Glover) and Abed (Danny Pudi) are trapped in the student lounge vending machine.

== Production ==
As made clear by their respective production codes, this episode was filmed before the episode Physical Education but aired after it. Jeff makes a comment to Leonard in that episode about attending family day, which occurs in this episode. As with all of their Community releases, Sony DVD and Mill Creek Blu-ray feature the episodes in their airdate order rather than production order.

== Reception ==
Around 4.7 million Americans watched "Basic Genealogy".

Emily VanDerWerff of The A.V. Club was disappointed in the episode and rated it a B. She said that this was the "first week where the sentimental moments and the hugging and the 'You can be a good person, Jeff Winger!' pep talks felt like they sort of overwhelmed some of the other elements of the show that I typically enjoy" and singled out guest star Katharine McPhee for an inconsistent performance.
