= Asian Population Studies =

- Community episode
- Episode no.: Season 2 Episode 12
- Directed by: Anthony Russo
- Written by: Emily Cutler
- Production code: 211
- Original air date: January 20, 2011

Guest appearances
- Malcolm-Jamal Warner as Andre Bennett; John Oliver as Dr. Ian Duncan; Greg Cromer as Rich; Charley Koontz as Fat Neil; Marcy McCusker as Quendra

Episode chronology
← Previous "Abed's Uncontrollable Christmas"	Next → "Celebrity Pharmacology"
- Community season 2

"Asian Population Studies" is the twelfth episode of the second season of the American comedy television series Community, and the 37th episode of the series overall. It aired in the United States on NBC on January 20, 2011.

== Plot ==
The study group regathers after the winter break. Annie (Alison Brie) hints that she met someone she likes, and the others try to guess who it is. Shirley (Yvette Nicole Brown) tries and fails to interest them in the fact she is getting back with her ex-husband. Chang (Ken Jeong) again requests to join the group, but Jeff (Joel McHale) flatly rejects him.

The group goes to their first class of the semester, Anthropology, taught by a now-sober Duncan. Troy (Donald Glover) accidentally tells Pierce (Chevy Chase) that Shirley had sex with Chang at the Halloween party no one can remember. (Note: As seen in "Epidemiology.") Rich (Greg Cromer), Jeff's nemesis from pottery class, enters and sits with Annie. Jeff realizes that he is the one Annie has a crush on.

In the cafeteria, Britta (Gillian Jacobs) realizes a sober Duncan will make the class more difficult. Annie suggests they ask Rich to join the study group. When Jeff objects, Annie suggests they have a mixer and invite a number of people from class to pick one as the next study group member. Shirley's ex-husband Andre (Malcolm-Jamal Warner) shows up. When he goes for ice cream, Britta tells Shirley that she should reconsider her decision, to which Shirley blurts out that she is pregnant and 8 weeks along. Troy and Pierce realize that she might be carrying Chang's baby.

At the mixer, Troy tries to find out if Shirley had sex with Andre around Halloween but fails. Pierce suggests that simply telling Shirley would be kinder to her. Jeff brings a pretty girl named Quendra (Marcy McCusker), hoping that will lure Pierce, Troy, and Abed to ask her to become a member instead of Rich, but something Pierce says makes her storm out. Rich brings kettle corn, instantly gaining popularity. Chang confronts Abed (Danny Pudi) about the fact that he wasn't invited, but Abed just acts like a malfunctioning robot.

Eventually, Annie calls for a vote, pointing out that Rich is the only candidate who has stayed. Jeff, desperate to keep Rich out of the study group, agrees to sponsor Chang. Jeff tries to convince the group to pick Chang over Rich, pointing out that they know very little about Rich and his perfect behavior is too good to be true.

The vote is evenly divided, with Jeff, Abed, and Britta voting for Chang, and Annie, Troy, and Pierce voting for Rich. Shirley breaks the tie by voting for Chang despite a threat from Pierce. Angry, Pierce callously reveals that Shirley had sex with Chang on Halloween and the baby might be his. Chang says that explains the photos on his phone, which he shows to a horrified Shirley.

Later, Annie confronts Jeff in the men's room and demands an explanation for his apparent jealousy. Jeff can only say that relationships are complicated. Britta then asks Jeff to get Andre to fix things with Shirley. Jeff finds Andre, who blames himself for leaving her in the first place and says he will raise the child whether it is his or Chang's. When Abed reports that Rich has rejected Annie for a date due to their age difference, Jeff rushes off dramatically in the rain to apologize and express his admiration to someone, eventually revealed to be Rich. Jeff confusedly explains his desire to learn Rich's "power" of being perfect so that he can abuse it. Explaining that he can't fake being good just to get away with bad things, Rich invites him in.

In the end tag, Rich visits 'Troy and Abed in the Morning' to demonstrate how to make kettle corn, even though he knows it's not a real TV show.

== Production ==
The episode was written by Emily Cutler and directed by Anthony Russo.

== Continuity ==
- Troy mentions the disturbing call he got from Chang on Halloween in the episode "Epidemiology".

== Cultural references ==
Pierce owns a LaserDisc edition of Emmanuelle in Space.

At one point, Jeff compliments Andre on his garish woolen sweater; Andre replies, "My dad gave it to me." This is a reference to Malcolm-Jamal Warner's stint as Theo Huxtable, son of Cliff Huxtable (noted for his brightly-colored sweaters) on The Cosby Show.

== Reception ==
In its original American broadcast, "Asian Population Studies" reached approximately 4.733 million households with a 2.2 rating/6% share in the 18–49 demographic.

This episode received positive review from the critics, with Samantha Urban of Dallas News writing, "You have to admire Community for being the only show on the Thursday night lineup that can get away with an ending that is sentimental without being saccharine, while still being funny and contributing to character development."

Kelsea Stahler of Hollywood.com wrote, "We've come to expect a lot from Community, so it's not going to get a gold star every week. This is one of those weeks. This week's episode was solid (and to be honest I can't think of a time when an episode of Community wasn't), but my favorite aspect wasn't the plot or even the one-liners, which are always on-point, it's the element of incredible attention to detail."
