= Custody Law and Eastern European Diplomacy =

- Community episode
- Episode no.: Season 2 Episode 18
- Directed by: Anthony Russo
- Written by: Andy Bobrow
- Production code: 217
- Original air date: March 17, 2011

Guest appearances
- Malcolm-Jamal Warner as Andre Bennett; Jim Rash as Dean Craig Pelton; Enver Gjokaj as Lukka

Episode chronology
← Previous "Intro to Political Science"	Next → "Critical Film Studies"
- Community season 2

"Custody Law and Eastern European Diplomacy" is the eighteenth episode of the second season of the American comedy television series Community, and the 43rd episode of the series overall. It aired in the United States on NBC on March 17, 2011. The episode focuses on Shirley's pregnancy, while Abed and Troy make friends with a student from the Balkans.

== Plot ==
The study group throws Shirley (Yvette Nicole Brown) a baby shower designed for the possibility that either Andre (Malcolm-Jamal Warner) or Chang (Ken Jeong) is the father. Chang appears disappointed when Shirley and Andre explain they will raise the baby even if Chang is the father. Britta (Gillian Jacobs) asks Abed (Danny Pudi) and Troy (Donald Glover) about their new friend Lukka (Enver Gjokaj). They assert she cannot date Lukka, as they don't want her to "ruin" him by divulging his secrets after they break up. Despite this, Britta stops by Abed's room when Lukka is there, and he asks her out.

Shirley asks Jeff (Joel McHale) to talk Chang, who is currently living with Jeff, into signing a document forfeiting any potential parental rights. Jeff reluctantly agrees to help. Later, Lukka and Britta are making out, and Lukka discusses his life in the Balkans. Britta slowly realizes that Lukka committed horrific acts against rebels there. Jeff arrives home and gives Chang the document. Chang thinks he could convince Shirley to keep his potential parental rights if he gets his own job and apartment, and Jeff plays along, hoping Chang will move out. The next day, Chang attempts to act maturely, and Shirley confronts Jeff for selling out.

Britta sees Troy and Abed playing a violent video game with Lukka and tries to point out Lukka's uncanny skill at the game. Troy and Abed brush her off, but she hatches a plan to frame Lukka for stealing one of Abed's DVDs. However, Abed has a camera in his dorm that catches her. She tries to explain that Lukka is a war criminal, but Troy and Abed ignore her.

Jeff finds Chang at home with two boys; Chang introduces them as Shirley's sons and explains he picked them up from school. Jeff tells the boys he will take them home; when he walks out, Chang realizes the boys are not Shirley's and calls the cops to report a kidnapping. Jeff is arrested but released after Shirley persuades the boys' mother not to press charges. They see Chang being arrested for his actions, and Jeff and Shirley try to figure out how to increase any potential sentence. Andre convinces the two to back down and show forgiveness.

Later, Troy and Abed tell Britta they asked Lukka questions about his past and learned the truth. The three agree to handle any potential relationship issues more maturely going forward.

== Production ==
"Custody Law and Eastern European Diplomacy" was the third episode of the show written by Andy Bobrow and one of many directed by Anthony Russo. It was the only episode in which Enver Gjokaj guest-starred, and the second of several featuring Malcolm-Jamal Warner.

== Reception ==
Around 4.15 million Americans watched "Custody Law and Eastern European Diplomacy".

Emily VanDerWerff of The A.V. Club rated the episode A−, calling the end of the A storyline somewhat weak, while praising the B storyline involving Britta and Lukka. TV Fanatic's Matt Richenthal rated the show 4 out of 5, calling it "great stuff all around" and praising Yvette Nicole Brown's comedy chops, while opining that she had not gotten enough camera time previously during the season.
