= Beginner Pottery =

- Community episode
- Episode no.: Season 1 Episode 19
- Directed by: Anthony Russo
- Written by: Hilary Winston
- Production code: 114
- Original air date: March 18, 2010

Guest appearances
- Tony Hale as Professor Holly; Lee Majors as Admiral Slaughter; Greg Cromer as Rich

Episode chronology
← Previous "Basic Genealogy"	Next → "The Science of Illusion"
- Community season 1

"Beginner Pottery" is the nineteenth episode of the first season of the American comedy television series Community. It aired in the United States on NBC on March 18, 2010.

== Plot ==
Jeff (Joel McHale) suggests his selection for the "ultimate blow-off class" to the study group: Beginner Pottery. Meanwhile, Pierce (Chevy Chase) enters the study group room in a sailing outfit. He then manages to convince Troy (Donald Glover), Shirley (Yvette Nicole Brown), and Britta (Gillian Jacobs) to sign up for a one-week sailing class with him that takes place on an actual sailboat in the Greendale parking lot.

Jeff, Abed (Danny Pudi), and Annie (Alison Brie) on the other hand sign up for pottery class, where their professor (Tony Hale) tells the class that he does not tolerate "ghosting"—any reenactment of the pottery scene with Demi Moore and Patrick Swayze from the movie Ghost. One of the students, Rich (Greg Cromer), sculpts a vase that impresses everyone in class except for Jeff, who becomes instantly jealous of him. At the end of the day, Jeff returns to the pottery classroom to try and make a creation that rivals that of Rich, but his efforts are ultimately in vain.

Meanwhile, the others on the boat are greeted by Admiral Slaughter (Lee Majors). After discussing the rules, Admiral Slaughter appoints Shirley as Captain, much to Pierce's dismay.

The next day, Jeff enters pottery class with his finger wrapped up, and Rich offers to take a look at Jeff's finger, revealing that he is a doctor who takes pottery class to unwind. However, Jeff believes that he is a con-man who signs up for novice classes to attract girls. Determined to prove his point, Jeff approaches Rich in the parking lot after pottery class and notices his license plate is from New Mexico, where Santa Fe is located. After spending the night reading about Santa Fe, Jeff is convinced that anyone from there would be skilled at pottery; Jeff thinks he has found the information he needs to expose Rich as a charlatan in class.

In the Greendale parking lot, Admiral Slaughter gives Shirley a scenario for a storm, who then decides the boat must turn back. As Admiral Slaughter releases the jib, everyone manages to duck in time except for Pierce, who is knocked off the boat, and Shirley decides to leave Pierce behind to save the rest of her crew from the storm.

Jeff goes to confront Rich in pottery class, but when Jeff tries to copy his technique, he inadvertently violates the professor's "no ghosting" rule and is thrown out of the class.

Jeff finds Pierce in a small rowboat on campus, who explains that his crewmates drowned him for a better grade. Jeff opens up to Pierce about the difficulty of failure, as not being able to make a good pot in class made him question himself.

Despite being left behind, Pierce is determined to return to his class. Pierce crashes his rowboat into a fountain, causing his boat to fill up with water, which Shirley and the crew witness. Though the rest are unwilling, Shirley makes the decision to go after him and keep him from drowning, and Pierce is saved by his fellow crewmates. At the end of the class, Admiral Slaughter promotes Shirley to Admiral and gives everyone an A.

Jeff returns to pottery class with the professor's approval. He apologizes to Rich for his behavior and finally comes to terms with making terrible pots. He imagines his mother telling him he is a normal person who is skilled in some things and less in others. It is then revealed Rich's secret to success is remembering the hurtful things his mother said to him in regards to his brother's death.

== Reception ==
Around 5.21 million Americans watched "Beginner Pottery".
