= Cooperative Polygraphy =

- Community episode
- Episode no.: Season 5 Episode 4
- Directed by: Tristram Shapeero
- Written by: Alex Rubens
- Production code: 503
- Original air date: January 16, 2014

Guest appearances
- Walton Goggins as Mr. Stone; Lesley Tsina as Mara

Episode chronology
← Previous "Basic Intergluteal Numismatics"	Next → "Geothermal Escapism"
- Community season 5

"Cooperative Polygraphy" is the fourth episode of the fifth season of Community, and its 88th episode overall. Written by Alex Rubens and directed by Tristram Shapeero, the episode originally aired on January 16, 2014 on NBC. In the episode, the study group takes a group polygraph test as requested in the will of Pierce Hawthorne (Chevy Chase). It quickly becomes apparent that the questions and their answers are intended to create tension among the members of the group. Walton Goggins guest stars as Mr. Stone, Pierce's executor who leads the polygraph test.

The episode received critical acclaim; however, the episode saw a ratings drop, with 3.07 million viewers watching.

== Plot ==
Returning to the study room after Pierce's (Chevy Chase) funeral, the study group is greeted by Mr. Stone (Walton Goggins), Pierce's executor.

Pierce's will stipulates that, no matter the apparent cause of his death, the group must undergo a polygraph examination as part of a private inquest to determine if any member of the group murdered him. During the session, the group is asked a series of personal questions that reveal selfish things they have done, such as Troy (Donald Glover) and Abed (Danny Pudi) using Jeff's (Joel McHale) Netflix account without his permission, Abed hiding GPS tracking devices on everyone to track their locations, and Annie (Alison Brie) having slipped the members of the group pills in order to make them more alert for studying.

The group repeatedly becomes tense and confrontational over these revelations. They eventually begin revealing other members' secrets in an attempt to shift attention from themselves. When they try to blame Pierce for setting them up, Mr. Stone points out that "Pierce" had not posed them any questions in a long time. However, after a speech from Jeff, they decide to stick it out, as they will each receive a bequest upon the session's completion.

The session concludes with Pierce's final words to each group member, which are mostly heartfelt, positive, and uplifting, with the exception of Jeff (to whom Pierce makes one final accusation of closeted homosexuality) and Abed (to whom Pierce simply says “nothing you ever said made any sense to me”). All are bequeathed gifts from Pierce, including a tiara for Annie, a used iPod for Britta (Gillian Jacobs), access to Pierce's Florida timeshare for Shirley (Yvette Nicole Brown) and her family, a bottle of top-shelf scotch for Jeff, and frozen samples of Pierce's sperm for everyone. Troy is given the most exceptional bequest: Pierce's share of Hawthorne Wipes, valued at $14.3 million, which Troy will receive after he fulfills a stipulation to sail around the world in Pierce's boat. Pierce was supposed to do this for his father but never did, causing him lifelong regret, and he believes the experience will help Troy discover who he truly is. Troy decides to accept the offer, leaving the rest of the group, particularly Abed, in shock.

During the credits, Mr. Stone has become intoxicated after joining the group at a bar. After rambling about his aspirations, he reveals that Pierce died of dehydration while collecting the sperm samples he gave to the group.

== Production ==
This episode introduces a plot line to explain Donald Glover's leaving the show. The name of Pierce's boat, Childish Tycoon, is a nod to Glover's stage name, Childish Gambino. The subplot with Troy can be viewed as an overall metaphor for Glover's rocket-trajectory career track. It also resolves the character arc of Pierce, played by Chevy Chase who left the show after the previous season.

"Cooperative Polygraphy" is a bottle episode as the entire episode, excluding the tag, takes place in the library study room, a primary set for the series. It also occurs in near real-time. The title is a reference to "Cooperative Calligraphy", another bottle episode set in the study room.

=== 2020 benefit virtual table read ===
This episode was chosen for a 2020 benefit table read where the cast and Dan Harmon reunited over video conferencing to raise money for the COVID-19 pandemic. The main cast all participated in the table read; however, due to scheduling conflicts, Walton Goggins was unable to participate, and his role was filled instead by Pedro Pascal.

== Reception ==
The episode saw a significant drop in ratings from the previous episode, with 3.07 million American viewers watching and attaining an 18–49 rating/share of 1.1/4. The show placed third in its timeslot and ninth for the night.

Despite low ratings, the episode received critical acclaim. Emily VanDerWerff of The A.V. Club gave the episode an A, saying the episode was "easily the best episode of the show since the third season and maybe even since that magical stretch around the midpoint of season two. It's an episode that contains ample amounts of both the laughs and the deeply felt emotional core that make this show work so well at its best... [It's] also wildly, wildly funny." Eric Goldman of IGN gave the episode a rating of 9 out of 10, saying "Another great Season 5 episode [...] managed to feel like an effective spiritual sequel to both “Cooperative Calligraphy” and “Intermediate Documentary Filmmaking” the latter, the episode where Pierce acted like he was dying and first gave “bequeathments.” Completely dialogue-driven, it delivered a funny and involving scenario, incorporating Pierce's voice into the group one last time, even without Pierce present."

Gabrielle Moss of TV Fanatic gave the episode a 4.5 out of 5, saying "Hawthorne's cranky, volatile rages [...] were regularly the weakest element of Community; and Hawthorne himself was often the weakest link, much funnier on paper than he was in action. Which is what made Community Season 5 Episode 4 the perfect tribute to Pierce – from weirdo religious cult to gross-out semen jokes, the episode played with Pierce as a concept, and served as a reminder to me of just how damned funny that concept was."

Tim Surette of TV.com also praised the episode, calling it "one heck of a great episode of Community, and the best of the revitalized Season 5. End of story. Well, not the end of this story, but at least the end of any lingering doubt that Community is back to form. "Repilot" showed us that Greendale could open its doors again, "Introduction to Teaching" showed us how the show could be given new life, and "Basic Intergluteal Numismatics" (a.k.a. "Intro to Butt Banking") showed us that Season 5 could handle a stunt episode. But "Cooperative Polygraphy"? This was Community at its finest no matter what part of its timeline you're talking about, a shoestring-budget masterpiece that maximized a simple premise to highlight the series' biggest strength: the bonds between the study group that make them a surrogate family for each other. Oh, and I laughed. A lot!"

Laurel Brown of Zap2it called the episode "a ridiculous, talkative and surprisingly touching tribute. [...] There probably was no better way to remember the oft-awful character than with a polygraph machine, Walton Goggins and one last Pierce-inspired fight."
