= Community season 5 =

Season of television series

Community
- Season 5
- DVD cover
- Showrunner: Dan Harmon
- Starring: Joel McHale; Gillian Jacobs; Danny Pudi; Yvette Nicole Brown; Alison Brie; Donald Glover; Jim Rash; Ken Jeong
- No. of episodes: 13

Release
- Original network: NBC
- Original release: January 2 – April 17, 2014

Season chronology
- ← Previous; Season 4 Next → Season 6

The fifth season of the television sitcom Community premiered on January 2, 2014, and concluded on April 17, 2014. The season consists of 13 episodes and aired on NBC on Thursdays at 8:00 pm ET as part of the network's "Comedy Night Done Right". The season features the return of series creator Dan Harmon as showrunner, as well as the exit of cast members Donald Glover and Chevy Chase from the series. John Oliver returned as Ian Duncan after a two-year hiatus. Jonathan Banks made his introduction to the series as Buzz Hickey, a criminology professor.

NBC announced the series' cancellation in May 2014, but in June 2014, Yahoo announced it had commissioned the show's sixth and final season to be streamed online on Yahoo Screen.

== Cast ==
=== Starring ===
- Joel McHale as Professor Jeff Winger
- Gillian Jacobs as Britta Perry
- Danny Pudi as Abed Nadir
- Yvette Nicole Brown as Shirley Bennett
- Alison Brie as Annie Edison
- Donald Glover as Troy Barnes
- Jim Rash as Dean Craig Pelton
- Ken Jeong as Professor Ben Chang

=== Recurring ===
- Jonathan Banks as Professor Buzz Hickey
- John Oliver as Dr. Ian Duncan
- Richard Erdman as Leonard Briggs
- Charley Koontz as Neil
- Erik Charles Nielsen as Garrett Lambert
- Dino Stamatopoulos as Alex "Star-Burns" Osbourne
- Danielle Kaplowitz as Vicki Jenkins
- Brie Larson as Rachel
- Luke Youngblood as Magnitude
- Brady Novak as Richie Countee
- Jeremy Scott Johnson as Carl Bladt
- James Michael Connor as the Subway Representative
- Leslie Simms as Rhonda

=== Guest stars ===
- Steve Agee as David ("App Development and Condiments")
- Paget Brewster as Debra Chambers ("Analysis of Cork-Based Networking")
- LeVar Burton as himself ("Geothermal Escapism")
- Kevin Corrigan as Professor Sean Garrity ("Introduction to Teaching")
- Chevy Chase as Pierce Hawthorne ("Repilot")
- Rob Corddry as Alan Connor ("Repilot")
- David Cross as Hank Hickey ("Advanced Advanced Dungeons & Dragons")
- Chris Elliott as Russell Borchert ("Basic Sandwich")
- Nathan Fillion as Bob Waite ("Analysis of Cork-Based Networking")
- Ben Folds as Professor Bublitz ("Basic Intergluteal Numismatics")
- Gina Gershon as Devon's wife ("VCR Maintenance and Educational Publishing")
- Vince Gilligan as Devon ("VCR Maintenance and Educational Publishing")
- Walton Goggins as Mr. Stone ("Cooperative Polygraphy")
- Tim Heidecker as Roger ("App Development and Condiments")
- Mitchell Hurwitz as Koogler ("App Development and Condiments")
- Jen Kirkman as Four ("App Development and Condiments")
- Katie Leclerc as Carol ("Analysis of Cork-Based Networking")
- Michael McDonald as Ronald Mohammad ("Basic Story")
- Jerry Minor as Jerry the Janitor ("Analysis of Cork-Based Networking")
- Dominik Musiol as Pavel Iwaszkiewicz ("VCR Maintenance and Educational Publishing")
- Kumail Nanjiani as Lapari ("Analysis of Cork-Based Networking")
- B. J. Novak as Mr. Egypt ("Basic Sandwich")
- Robert Patrick as Waldron ("Analysis of Cork-Based Networking")
- Eddie Pepitone as Crazy Schmidt ("Analysis of Cork-Based Networking")
- Brian Posehn as Bixel ("App Development and Condiments")
- Questlove as himself ("Basic Sandwich")
- Amber Tamblyn as herself ("Basic Sandwich")
- Eric Wareheim as Billy ("App Development and Condiments")
- Paul Williams as Britta's Connection ("VCR Maintenance and Educational Publishing")

== Episodes ==
Season five episodes
No. overall	No. in season	Title	Directed by	Written by	Original release date	Prod. code	U.S. viewers (millions)
85	1	"Repilot"	Tristram Shapeero	Dan Harmon & Chris McKenna	January 2, 2014	501	3.49
Jeff returns to Greendale a year after graduation to research a potential lawsuit after his practice goes under. While doing this, he finds out what has happened to his friends within the study group since his departure.
86	2	"Introduction to Teaching"	Jay Chandrasekhar	Andy Bobrow	January 2, 2014	502	3.49
Jeff begins his teaching job at Greendale and is shown the ropes by Professor Buzz Hickey (Jonathan Banks), with whom he shares an office, adjusting to the expectations of being on staff. Meanwhile, Abed convinces the rest of the study group to take Professor Garrity's new class on whether Nicolas Cage is "good" or "bad".
87	3	"Basic Intergluteal Numismatics"	Tristram Shapeero	Erik Sommers	January 9, 2014	505	3.58
Jeff and Annie try to solve the case of the Ass Crack Bandit, who drops coins into people's pants. Though the suspect is quickly caught, Jeff believes that perhaps the real Bandit is still at large.
88	4	"Cooperative Polygraphy"	Tristram Shapeero	Alex Rubens	January 16, 2014	503	3.07
In the wake of Pierce's death, the study group undergo a polygraph test as part of the conditions of his will, but it soon turns sour as the group's secrets come to light.
89	5	"Geothermal Escapism"	Joe Russo	Tim Saccardo	January 23, 2014	504	3.02
To honor Troy's last day at Greendale, Abed organizes a campus-wide game of "The Floor Is Lava", throwing the school into an apocalyptic scenario.
90	6	"Analysis of Cork-Based Networking"	Tristram Shapeero	Monica Padrick	January 30, 2014	506	3.01
Annie and Hickey embark on a mission to start improving Greendale, but it soon turns into a labyrinthine chain of favors. Meanwhile, the rest of the group help set up a dance, and Abed connects with a fellow student.
91	7	"Bondage and Beta Male Sexuality"	Tristram Shapeero	Dan Guterman	February 27, 2014	507	2.56
Jeff helps Dr. Duncan try to win over Britta's affection, Abed and Hickey face off after Abed accidentally ruins some of Hickey's drawings, and Chang finds himself in the middle of a ghostly mystery.
92	8	"App Development and Condiments"	Rob Schrab	Jordan Blum & Parker Deay	March 6, 2014	508	2.79
The introduction of an app that allows people to rate others causes the campus to devolve into a caste-based society. Meanwhile, Britta attempts to fight back against the system, learning that more people are willing to listen to her with mustard on her face.
93	9	"VCR Maintenance and Educational Publishing"	Tristram Shapeero	Donald Diego	March 13, 2014	509	2.77
Annie and Abed play an old-west themed VCR game to decide whether Annie's brother Anthony or Abed's girlfriend Rachel should be their new roommate. Meanwhile, Jeff, Shirley, and Hickey discover a large stash of unused textbooks, but soon turn on each other when deciding the best way to sell them.
94	10	"Advanced Advanced Dungeons & Dragons"	Joe Russo	Matt Roller	March 20, 2014	510	3.32
The study group organizes a game of Dungeons & Dragons so that Hickey can reconnect with his estranged son, Hank (David Cross), which goes awry.
95	11	"G.I. Jeff" "Government Issue Jeff"	Rob Schrab	Dino Stamatopoulos	April 3, 2014	513	2.50
Jeff finds himself and the rest of the group all part of an episode of "G.I. Joe", while faced with unsettling visions.
96	12	"Basic Story"	Jay Chandrasekhar	Carol Kolb	April 10, 2014	512	2.56
When the Save Greendale committee succeeds in appraising the school to be an asset instead of a liability, the school board immediately decides to sell it to Subway. Abed, Annie, and the Dean find a secret that may save the school, and Jeff must decide where his allegiance lies.
97	13	"Basic Sandwich"	Rob Schrab	Ryan Ridley	April 17, 2014	511	2.87
With Greendale hours away from sale, the group searches for the hidden lab of the school's first Dean, believing there is a treasure there which can save the school.

== Production ==
On May 10, 2013, NBC announced it had renewed the series for a fifth season, to consist of 13 episodes. The season does not feature original cast member Chevy Chase in a regular role, as he left the series near the end of the fourth season by mutual agreement between the actor and network. Chase does appear in a guest role during the first episode of the season, and the character's exit from the show is finalized in "Cooperative Polygraphy." Donald Glover, who portrays Troy Barnes, only appears in five of the thirteen episodes. Jonathan Banks appears in eleven of the season's thirteen episodes as criminology professor Buzz Hickey. John Oliver, who played Ian Duncan throughout the first two seasons, reprises his role in season five for seven episodes. Rob Corddry reprises his role as lawyer Alan Connor in the season premiere. Walton Goggins guest stars in "Cooperative Polygraphy" as a mysterious man named Mr. Stone, "with a dangerous accusation, a tantalizing offer and a devious plan that will change the group forever." Other guest stars in the season include Vince Gilligan, Mitchell Hurwitz, Tim Heidecker, Eric Wareheim, Brie Larson, Nathan Fillion, Robert Patrick, Paget Brewster, Kumail Nanjiani, Katie Leclerc, and Ben Folds. David Cross guest stars in an episode that serves as a sequel to season 2's "Advanced Dungeons & Dragons", playing Hank Hickey, the estranged son of Professor Hickey. B. J. Novak has a cameo in the second part of the two-part season finale.

Season 5 began shooting on August 19, 2013.

The fifth season marked the return of series creator Dan Harmon as showrunner and executive producer after he was fired from the show after the end of the third season. Former writer-producer Chris McKenna also returned as an executive producer. Season 4 showrunners Moses Port and David Guarascio did not return for season 5, as their contracts were for one year. The only other returning writers are Andy Bobrow and Tim Saccardo. Meanwhile, Annie Mebane, Steve Basilone, Maggie Bandur, and Ben Wexler all departed to join The Michael J. Fox Show, while Megan Ganz joined Modern Family. Writers who joined for the fifth season include Parker Deay and Jordan Blum (American Dad!), Alex Rubens (Key & Peele), Ryan Ridley (Rick and Morty), Dan Guterman (The Colbert Report), and Matt Roller (Funny or Die). Other writers include Carol Kolb, Briggs Hatton, Clay Lapari, Erik Sommers, Monica Padrick and Donald Diego.

== Reception ==
The fifth season received strongly positive reception from television critics and is considered an improvement over the previous season. The season received a Metacritic score of 80 out of 100 based on 15 reviews, signifying "generally favorable" reviews. On Rotten Tomatoes, the season has an approval rating of 93% with an average score of 8.5 out of 10 based on 42 reviews. The website's critical consensus reads, "With Dan Harmon back as its show runner, Community returns with a familiar new energy and more fun, exciting adventures for the Greendale gang."

Verne Gay of Newsday gave the back-to-back episodes an "A" grade, remarking that the first of the two ("Repilot") was funny, while the latter ("Introduction to Teaching") was "simply hilarious." Alan Sepinwall, writing for HitFix, remarked that the show "is back, and back to being itself."

== DVD release ==
The fifth season was released on DVD in region 1 on August 5, 2014 and in region 2 on July 21, 2014.
