= VCR Maintenance and Educational Publishing =

- Community episode
- Episode no.: Season 5 Episode 9
- Directed by: Tristram Shapeero
- Written by: Donald Diego
- Production code: 509
- Original air date: March 13, 2014

Guest appearances
- Jonathan Banks as Professor Buzz Hickey; Vince Gilligan as Devon / Pile of Bullets' Host; Paul Williams as a black-market book dealer; Brie Larson as Rachel; Spencer Crittenden as Anthony Edison; Gina Gershon as Devon's wife (uncredited)

Episode chronology
← Previous "App Development and Condiments"	Next → "Advanced Advanced Dungeons & Dragons"
- Community season 5

"VCR Maintenance and Educational Publishing" is the ninth episode of the fifth season of Community, and the 93rd episode overall in the series. It originally aired on March 13, 2014 on NBC. The episode was written by Donald Diego, and directed by Tristram Shapeero. The episode marked the series writing debut of Diego.

The episode was met with generally positive reviews. Despite positive reviews from critics, however, the episode maintained the previous two weeks' ratings low with a 1.0/4 in the 18-49 rating/share with an audience of 2.77 million American viewers.

== Plot ==
At a Save Greendale committee meeting, Jeff (Joel McHale), Shirley (Yvette Nicole Brown), and Professor Hickey (Jonathan Banks) agree to clean out one of Greendale's storage rooms. Abed (Danny Pudi) and his girlfriend Rachel (Brie Larson) have been dating for a month, and she recently purchased him an old VCR videogame called "Pile of Bullets." Abed asks Annie (Alison Brie) if he can have Rachel over for dinner tonight, but Annie reveals that she has already invited her estranged brother Anthony (Spencer Crittenden) to dinner. Abed is able to convince Annie to make the dinner a double date with both Rachel and Anthony.

At dinner, Anthony proves himself extremely helpful by fixing Annie and Abed's fridge door. This leads Annie to ask Abed if Anthony can move into the apartment, but Abed objects as he wants Rachel to move into the apartment. Throughout the night, Abed and Annie attempt to convince one another that their preferred candidate would be a better roommate. Abed eventually makes a deal with Annie that whoever wins a game of "Pile of Bullets" will have their preferred candidate become their roommate. Abed, Annie, Rachel, and Anthony attempt to play the game but are confused by its nonsensical rules and directions. Rachel eventually uncovers Abed and Annie's deal and breaks up with Abed as she feels manipulated. Anthony also leaves the apartment, as he believes that Annie and Abed still haven't properly dealt with Troy's absence. Abed visits Rachel and performs a final act romantic comedy apology, which wins her back.

Meanwhile, Jeff, Shirley, and Hickey stumble across a pack of mint condition chemistry textbooks while they are cleaning the storage room. The group realizes that the textbooks are extremely valuable and decide to sell them instead of handing them over to the school. The group contacts Britta, who agrees to organize a buyer for the books in exchange for a cut of the profits. Chang then walks in on the scheme. The group coerces him into confessing that he stole the books while being filmed by Britta. Realizing that things have gone too far, Jeff wants out of the plan. Shirley doesn't allow this and has Jeff tied up along with Chang. Britta's buyer is ready to meet with her, but Jeff manages to convince Shirley and Hickey that Britta could double-cross them. Shirley decides to complete the sale herself and ties up Britta and Hickey. When Shirley meets with Britta's contact (Paul Williams), he reveals that the textbooks have no page numbers and the whole bundle is only worth $20 as recycled paper. Shirley, realizing her mistake, frees Hickey, Britta, Chang, and Jeff.

The group comes together for another Save Greendale committee meeting the next day, where Abed admits to Annie that he has been missing Troy. Abed and Annie then agree to find a roommate on Craigslist.

During the credits in 1993, it is shown that Devon (Vince Gilligan), the host of the "Pile of Bullets" videogame, worked for Apple, before being convinced by his wife (Gina Gershon) to quit the "sinking ship" of Apple, since according to her, VCR videogames were where the future was heading. (In fact, Apple's market valuation did plunge in 1993, not reaching similar levels until the tech boom five years later, and not fully recovering until more than a decade later.)

== Reception ==
=== Ratings ===
Upon airing, the episode was watched by 2.77 million American viewers, and received an 18-49 rating/share of 1.0/4. The show placed fourth in its time-slot, behind The Big Bang Theory, Hell's Kitchen, and Once Upon a Time in Wonderland; and thirteenth for the night.

=== Critical reception ===
"VCR Maintenance And Educational Publishing" was met with positive reviews from critics, with many praising Yvette Nicole Brown's performance. Emily VanDerWerff of The A.V. Club gave the episode a B+, writing: "'VCR Maintenance And Educational Publishing' probably isn’t an episode that anyone is going to think about fondly in years to come, when recalling their five or 10 favorite Community episodes, but it has moments—both humorous and emotional—where the show attains everything it’s capable of."
