= Advanced Advanced Dungeons & Dragons =

- Community episode
- Episode no.: Season 5 Episode 10
- Directed by: Joe Russo
- Written by: Matt Roller
- Production code: 510
- Original air date: March 20, 2014

Guest appearances
- Jonathan Banks as Professor Buzz Hickey; David Cross as Hank Hickey; Charley Koontz as Fat Neil

Episode chronology
← Previous "VCR Maintenance and Educational Publishing"	Next → "G.I. Jeff"
- Community season 5

"Advanced Advanced Dungeons & Dragons" is the tenth episode of the fifth season of Community, and the 94th episode overall in the series. It originally aired on March 20, 2014 on NBC. The episode was written by Matt Roller, and directed by Joe Russo. The episode marked the series writing debut of Roller and the final episode directed by Russo.

Critics gave the episode generally positive reviews, praising the exceptional sound design and action sequences that helped evoke a fantasy world. The episode received a 1.1/4 in the 18-49 rating/share, increasing slightly from the week before. 3.32 million American viewers watched this episode, increasing from the previous week's audience of 2.77 million viewers.

== Plot ==
At a Save Greendale committee meeting, Professor Hickey (Jonathan Banks) learns that he was not invited to his 3-year-old grandson's birthday party. Hickey becomes irate that his son Hank Hickey (David Cross) continues to limit visiting time with his grandson, while spending all his time playing the role-playing game, Dungeons & Dragons. The group then decides to help father and son reunite through a rousing game of Dungeons & Dragons.

The group and a reluctant Hank meet at Abed's (Danny Pudi) apartment, where Abed reprises his role as the Dungeon Master. Abed describes the eight adventurers arriving in the troubled realm of Galindor, where they must vanquish an evil Necromancer who rules in a dark tower across a bridge. Hank, seeing through the group's contrived plan to reconcile father and son, mixes and redistributes each character's sheet. His character is now Tristram Steelheart, a Holy Cleric; Hickey is named Tiny Nuggins, a Halfling Thief; Britta (Gillian Jacobs) is Fibrosis, a Ranger; Shirley (Yvette Nicole Brown) is Crouton, a Half-orc Druid; Annie (Alison Brie) reprises her role as Hector the Well Endowed; Chang (Ken Jeong) is a Troll named Dingleberry; and Jeff (Joel McHale) is Sir Riggs Diehard, much to the delight of Dean Pelton (Jim Rash), who is his son, Joseph Gordon Diehard.

Hank rejects the group’s given mission and decides to head south instead. Annie attempts to lift Hank and carry him to the bridge, but Hank casts a fire spell in self-defense, dealing damage to Annie and also setting the bridge's rope supports on fire. The bridge is unable to hold the weight of the party and they plummet into a raging river below, splitting the group apart with Jeff, Hickey, Shirley, and Annie washing up on the left fork of Skull river, and the remaining party on the right. Hank threatens to quit, so to prevent him from doing so, Hickey wagers that if he kills the Necromancer first, he is allowed to come to his grandson's birthday. Hank accepts, stating that if he wins Hickey will not go to the family's Christmas or Thanksgiving. The parties then go into separate rooms.

After being washed ashore, Hickey's impatience and new-found motivation to win the game leads him to delve into the neighboring jungle alone, encountering a hostile patrol of Hobgoblins. Shirley, Jeff, and Annie follow while the Hobgoblins, alerted to Hickey's presence, charge at him with spears. Shirley uses a spell to entangle four of the charging Hobgoblins. The two remaining Hobgoblins, however, fire arrows at Crouton, fatally wounding her. Shirley blames her character's death on Hickey and leaves the apartment. Hickey's group follows the fleeing Hobgoblins to the Gob Shack and kills them. Five Goblins are nearby and the group ambushes them, killing three and taking two alive. Hickey interrogates the two Goblins, both of whom are played by Abed. Hickey manages to wear down their resolve, and one of the Goblins confesses the location of the Black Tower.

Meanwhile, Hank casts a healing spell on Fibrosis, attempting to coax her into helping him. He reveals that he resents his father because he was absent during his birthdays. Hank's party then encounters giant, flying, Sky-spiders. Hank casts a spell to speak with the spiders and successfully achieves a non-combative resolution. The Sky-spiders fly his party closer and give them directions to the Tower. Both parties simultaneously arrive at the Black Tower and attempt to intimidate the other into yielding. An emotional Dean attempts to defect so that he can reunite with his father Jeff, who draws his sword. The dean nevertheless approaches to hug Jeff and impales himself on Jeff's sword. The dean's death breaks the standoff. The parties decimate each other in a combination of spells, sword-fighting, and Chang's loud, confused Troll noises, with only Hank and Hickey surviving the melee.

Hank and Hickey enter the Tower while still fighting each other, reaching the Necromancer's workshop. The Necromancer, however, has fled while the parties spent an hour fighting over who gets to kill him. Hank and Hickey complain to Abed over the lack of a resolution, but Abed says it is their own fault for delaying the battle by infighting. Continuing to fight with each other, Hank and Hickey attempt to divide the Necromancer's loot before following him out of the Black Tower. With only the two of them remaining in the game to work together, Jeff and the group leave the apartment saying "that's the best most fathers and sons can do."

The end-credits scene shows Abed angrily Dungeon-Mastering a game among four of Annie's stuffed animals. The implication is that Abed is attempting to confront his grief of Troy's loss by proxy as the fluffy adventurers arrive at the Chamber of Grief.

== Cultural references ==
The episode used the popular role-playing game, Dungeons & Dragons, to drive its plot. It borrowed heavily from its lore, characters, and creatures as in the first installment where the group played D&D to save Fat Neil's life. The Dean's character, Joseph Gordon Diehard, is an homage to Joseph Gordon-Levitt's portrayal of a younger Bruce Willis in the film, Looper. The character is also an homage to the film, Die Hard starring Bruce Willis, which is often referenced in the series. Likewise, the character of Sir Riggs Diehard is a dual reference to both Lethal Weapon and Willis. The Elvish song sung by Hank spoofs a similar song sung in the first installment in The Hobbit trilogy. Hank's spamming of the "lightning bolt" spell during the ultimate battle parodied the viral video of a live-action role-playing game battle (LARP) from 2005.

== Reception ==
=== Ratings ===
Upon airing, the episode was watched by 3.32 million American viewers, receiving a 1.1/4 in the 18-49 rating/share. The show placed fourth out of fifth in its time slot, behind Hell's Kitchen, the 2014 NCAA basketball tournament, and Once Upon a Time in Wonderland; and ninth out of thirteenth for the night.

=== Critical reception ===
The episode received generally positive reviews but was considered a less-than-worthy sequel to its predecessor, "Advanced Dungeons & Dragons". Emily St. James of The A.V. Club rated the episode at a "B+," writing how this episode had a "high hurdle to clear" because of the standard set in the original when it demonstrated how the show does everything it does well. St. James wrote how the episode "sort-of" measured up to the original and criticized how the episode struggled to wrap up the story. Despite her reservations, she wrote how the episode worked even in spite of these flaws because it was fun to see all the characters playing the game together. She criticized how the conflict between Hank and Hickey felt generic and given less weight when compared to the previous vital conflict between Pierce and saving Fat Neil's life. She praised the casting of David Cross (Arrested Development, Mr. Show with Bob and David) as Hickey's son, Hank, and said she liked "the idea [of] having the two of them in the same room — even if they couldn’t stand each other — talking through their issues via the proxy of the game." She also praised the interrogation sequence between Hickey and the Hobgoblins (giving a taste of how Hickey operated as a cop) and praised the sound effects and camera movements that depicted the action in the game. Ultimately, she concluded that the "first D&D episode was much better at telling a compelling story about these characters and what they went through to save someone who wasn’t even one of their own." Rather, this episode "was better at capturing the feel of what it’s like to gather with friends and roll some dice, then laugh about how much fun something so silly can be."

Joe Matar of Den of Geek gave the episode 3.5 out of 5 stars, saying how it was "an unabashed redux [of the original], taking the same basic premise of having the characters sit around and play a D&D game that happens to be a framework for healing real emotional issues." He wrote how this installment did not compare as well because the stakes were lower, the characters didn't feel well defined, and there was no villain. Matar criticized the basic premise of the sequel:

"When the game was being played for Fat Neil, it was obviously a very grave situation: Neil might be suicidal. Furthermore, it was tied heavily back to one of our main characters, Jeff, who inadvertently coined the 'Fat Neil' nickname and therefore felt tangentially responsible for Neil’s suicidal tendencies. The trouble with Neil was introduced in the episode in such a way that it felt like this D&D game was an absolute necessity to avert a tragedy. Here, the group just forces the game into being when they learn that Hank is into Dungeons & Dragons. To use a Home Alone analogy (proven to be the most effective of all analogy types), it’s like how in the first Home Alone, Kevin had no choice but to protect his house, but in Home Alone 2: Lost in New York, he went out of his way to lure the robbers into a house of traps. The premise is shoehorned into working rather than organically feeling like the right thing to do."

Matar wrote how Hickey being prevented from spending time with his grandson "doesn’t quite work because the problems between Hank and Buzz feel vague and undefined." In the first installment, Matar wrote, the character traits (like Britta's liberalism) of each member shone through. Here, only Hickey's interrogation sequence and Abed's proclivities to act out characters in his universe were displayed, while Shirley was killed off quickly and David Cross was underused. Despite this pronouncement, Matar praised Jim Rash's performance, saying that "his death scene is almost irrefutably the best bit of the episode." He also praised the episode for mixing up the setting. Matar wrote, however, that the lack of a strong villain like Pierce was a severe shortcoming:

"Everybody always hated on Pierce during Season 2 when he was at the height of his dickishness, but I absolutely loved how well the character functioned as a villain, and his role in the original D&D episode was a lynchpin in how awesome that episode ended up being. Of course, it’s both wise and completely necessary that 'Advanced Advanced Dungeons & Dragons' doesn’t have the same exact setup. There’s no clear villain and, almost from the start, everyone’s divided into two factions and two separate rooms."

Brian Collins of Badass Digest starts by saying he was disappointed with the episode "aping one of the series' best" but then qualified his criticism by saying Dan Harmon undertook this sequel as a "fuck you" to NBC, who hated the original episode in Season 2. Collins recounts Harmon's interview in Rolling Stone where Harmon "admits that the episode was not organic, difficult to write, and it would be all his fault if it was the worst episode ever." Despite this qualification, Collins said how this episode "never really gelled" for him. He initially praised the episode for delivering on enough laughs, but said the lack of a real conflict and a lukewarm resolution soured the episode for him. He said the stakes were not high enough when compared to the original, and found it difficult to become invested in a vague conflict between Hickey and his son. Unlike many other reviews, Collins was not amused by the Dean and Jeff's subplot saying it was "rather annoying" where the Dean "takes his role as Jeff's son a bit too seriously." He calls the Hickey interrogation of an NPC as a "fun bit," hedging that statement by saying that "scattered moments aren't enough to overcome the fact that the episode has no reason to exist beyond 'let's do D&D again.'" Despite his harsh treatment of the episode, Collins said that the episode "LOOKS good," praising the direction of Joe Russo, who infused the battle "scenes some much needed energy, with his soaring and oft-moving camera giving us a few peeks at previously unseen areas at their apartment."

Sarah Shachat from Screen Crave rated the episode 8 out of 10, praising Joe Russo's direction at expertly angling dramatic shots to "evoke the sense of imagining a fantasy world." She wrote how the camera shots contributed to the humor, especially in the interrogation scene where "different angles [were] used as Hickey interrogates the hobgoblins (both played by Abed by oddly splitting his lip)." Shachat lauded the literary device of splitting-up the parties, facilitating competition, homing in "on the father/son motivations and issues for that race." She "loved how completely Jim Rash committed to his filial devotion, and his dreamy sequence of trying to contact his lost father via sparrow was a great interlude. The pile of failed notes sitting in Abed’s trashcan made the gag too." Her main criticisms came at the premise of the episode, i.e., the conflict between Hank and Hickey, which she called "generic." Shachat also criticized the abrupt resolution of the episode, but concluded that the show "put together another convivial roleplaying quest."

Eric Goldman from IGN rated the episode 8.5 out of 10, saying it was a "solid sequel that delivers plenty of great entertainment, even if it can’t quite mach [sic] the heights of its predecessor." Goldman applauded Jim Rash's performance saying there "were some clear standouts though, including Dean Pelton, who was oh-so eager to embrace his role as Jeff’s son in the game ('FATHER!') in increasingly amusing ways. Jim Rash was hysterical showing all the different ways the Dean got into character and I loved his earnest 'Me too!' response to Buzz’s son’s sarcastic comment about loving being told exactly what to do while role-playing." He also praised the interrogation sequence where "Buzz interrogated the two different hobgoblins (both Abed, naturally)...as we cut back and forth between the two angles of Abed, as Buzz’s tough cop persona broke his 'prisoners.'" He also praised the direction of Joe Russo, as well as the sound FX throughout, which he said was "incredibly well-timed." Ultimately he tempered his praise by saying that although this was a really funny episode of Community, the first D&D episode was a classic:

"Perhaps inevitably, it was hard not to recall what an emotionally powerful place the first D&D episode went to and find this somewhat lacking by comparison. It was the right call to not try to emulate something as heavy and big as Neil's suicidal thoughts, but it still felt like Buzz and his son’s reconciliation felt a bit undercooked at the end - there wasn’t a big enough moment to really help us see the shift that Jeff and the others saw and it felt like things wrapped up because it was time to wrap them up."
