= Fat Dog (disambiguation) =

Fat Dog is a British musical group.

== See also ==
- Fat Dog Mendoza, animated television series and the title character
- "Fat Dog For Midterms", a dance theme in the fifth-season Community episode "Analysis of Cork-Based Networking"
- Obesity in pets
