= Geothermal Escapism =

- Community episode
- Episode no.: Season 5 Episode 5
- Directed by: Joe Russo
- Written by: Tim Saccardo
- Production code: 504
- Original air date: January 23, 2014

Guest appearances
- John Oliver as Dr Ian Duncan; Jonathan Banks as Professor Buzz Hickey; Charley Koontz as Neil; LeVar Burton as himself

Episode chronology
← Previous "Cooperative Polygraphy"	Next → "Analysis of Cork-Based Networking"
- Community season 5

"Geothermal Escapism" (also titled in the opening credits as "Community: Lava World") is the fifth episode of the fifth season of Community, and the 89th episode overall in the series. It originally aired on January 23, 2014 on NBC; and was written by Tim Saccardo and directed by Joe Russo. This is also the last episode of the series to feature Donald Glover as Troy Barnes, who left the show for other film and music career commitments.

The episode also featured a cameo appearance from LeVar Burton, who last appeared in the second season episode "Intermediate Documentary Filmmaking"; his appearance was received positively by critics.

In this episode, as Troy Barnes prepares to leave Greendale for a year-long sailing trip in order to attain Pierce Hawthorne's (Chevy Chase) reward from his will, Abed Nadir (Danny Pudi) organizes a campus-wide game of "The Floor is Lava", which grows surprisingly competitive when Abed reveals the prize: a comic book worth $50,000. While the game progresses, Britta Perry (Gillian Jacobs) tries to convince the study group – specifically Abed – to appropriately cope with Troy's leaving other than another campus-wide competition, and she enlists Professor Buzz Hickey (Jonathan Banks) to help her.

Commentators applauded the episode, specifically Abed's role in trying to cope with Troy's impending departure; however, some were critical of the episode's theme and the show's dependency on concept episodes. Upon airing, the episode attained 3.02 million viewers and an 18-49 rating of 1.1, placing fifth in its timeslot and thirteenth for the night among primetime television.

== Plot ==
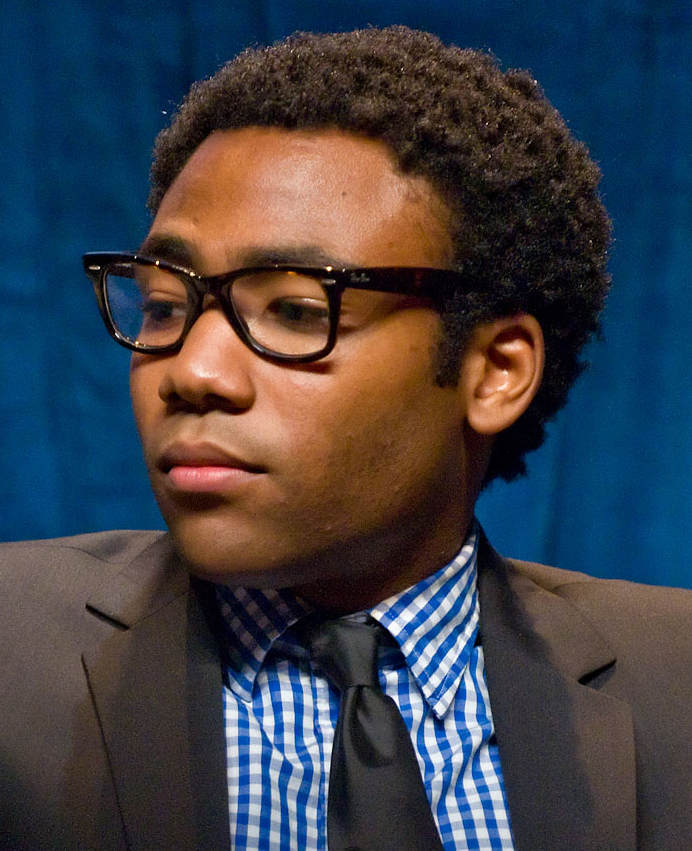
This was the last episode for series regular Donald Glover.

Troy (Donald Glover) is prepared to now enjoy his last day at Greendale before setting out on a sailing trip around the world as set forth by Pierce's (Chevy Chase) will. While the rest of the study group wishes Troy their best, Abed (Danny Pudi) announces over the school's PA that the school is now holding a campus-wide game of "The Floor is Lava", with the last "survivor" set to win a comic book valued at $50,000. The campus breaks down into chaos as the game begins. Britta (Gillian Jacobs) suspects Abed is holding back his feelings and trying to prevent Troy from leaving.

Britta initially teams up with Jeff (Joel McHale) and Annie (Alison Brie). They work their way through the campus following Abed and Troy, using chairs and other pieces of furniture to stay off the floor, until they are set on by the "Locker Boys" led by Chang (Ken Jeong). Professor Hickey (Jonathan Banks) then attacks both sides from an improvised tank, and Troy and Abed leave Britta for dead. Britta joins Hickey and the two lead an assault on "Shirley Island", a fortification set up in the cafeteria where Abed and Troy are hiding. Most of the combatants, including Jeff and Annie, fall into the "lava"; Abed and Troy escape on a zorb and Britta pursues them into the basement. As Britta presses Abed to acknowledge his feelings, he admits that he is terrified of losing Troy but cannot allow this to hold Troy back. Handing the prize comic book to Troy, Abed lets himself fall into the "lava" and plays dead. Troy and Britta, now seriously concerned with Abed's well-being, act out a scene where they resurrect him as a clone. Abed accepts this resolution, explaining that as a "clone" he can now accept Troy's departure rationally. Troy, who is scared of leaving, similarly lets himself fall into the "lava" (causing Britta to win the game), so that his "clone" can more resolutely face the impending journey.

As the school recovers from the game, Troy says goodbye to the group, who all claim to have been brought back as clones too. He notes that Pierce's will assigns a supervisor to his journey to make sure he does not cheat, as Pierce once did. The boat (the Childish Tycoon), pulls up on a trailer, and the supervisor is revealed to be LeVar Burton, of whom Troy, now supposedly a clone, is no longer afraid. The group gives Troy a final goodbye as the boat on its trailer pulls away.

In the closing scene, the boat is stuck in traffic and Troy asks Burton a list of questions about Star Trek.

== Reception ==
=== Ratings ===
The episode attained with 3.02 million viewers, and received an 18-49 rating/share of 1.1/3. The show placed fifth in its timeslot and thirteenth for the night. The episode tied in 18-49 ratings with the previous episode, but was down in overall viewers.

=== Critical reception ===
The episode was received positively by critics. Emily VanDerWerff of The A.V. Club gave the episode an A−, saying "The concept episodes of Community usually work best when they hook in to some emotional element in the show's core. So it makes sense that the show would haul out a concept episode for the episode where Troy leaves, and it makes even more sense that that concept would be "post-apocalyptic," because Troy's departure feels like the end of the world for the characters on the show, just as surely as it does for many of the show's fans." She did, however, criticize the episode's focus on more than just Glover, saying "it's a little weird to me that the show took the final appearance of Troy and mostly made it a story about other people. I get why that was done, and I think the story as it played was more or less fine. But the show felt slightly separated from Troy from the very first episode this season, and to have that continue all the way through his departure was slightly disappointing when it comes to one of the show's best characters. The final act of this episode, where Troy admits that he, too, is scared to be leaving but has to go, then takes his leave, is really great stuff, and it goes a long way to filling in some of those blanks. But if there's a reason I hold the episode at a slight remove, it's because of how the story seems aimed slightly off."

Eric Goldman of IGN gave the episode a 9 out of 10, saying the episode "was always going to be a big episode of Community and it delivered a fitting farewell to Troy Barnes. While the "Greendale goes all-in on a game" concept had been done before, it set the stage for a funny and emotional goodbye to a character that will be missed by the audience and characters alike."

Britt Hayes of ScreenCrush praised the episode's theme, and Troy's departure, saying "It's only fitting that Community would send Troy off with a big theme episode, so in "Geothermal Escapism" we get just that when Abed constructs a giant contest of "the ground is hot lava" at Greendale, making a childhood game of imagination into something highly competitive, with his most valuable comic book as the prize." She then applauded the episode's ending, saying "I'm not going to lie: I cried a whole lot at the end of tonight's episode. I think I was more emotionally unprepared for Troy leaving than Abed was. But it's such a beautifully executed and simple departure, and it allows Troy to say goodbye to everyone one at a time without trying to get too big about it. It is what it is. And if it weren't for Levar Burton showing up as Troy's escort for his big journey, I probably never would have stopped crying."

Tim Surette of TV.com also gave a positive review, despite presenting skepticism of the episode's theme, saying "For about 13 minutes there, I was pretty worried about "Geothermal Escapism," the Community episode that will forever be known as the episode where we said goodbye to Troy and learned that self-publishing books don't publish themselves. Sorry to be taking bribes from Big Buzzkill, but a silly Waterworld/Mad Max parody was not how I wanted to see Butt Soup off. However, this is Community, and as is generally the case with the show's spirit, Abed, indulging childish fantasy was the show's way of facing a difficult reality and confronting the truth. "Geothermal Escapism" squeezed our hearts 'til they burst, milked our eyeballs for their sweet treasure trove of tears, and eased our worried souls until we were ready to let go. The episode as a whole wasn't perfect, but Troy's send-off was, and that was the whole point." He also commented positively on Abed's role in the episode, saying "Abed's schoolwide game of Hot Lava was ridiculously fun, but it was also ridiculous and it elevated the proceedings to a point where the return to "real life" would hit that much harder."

Dave Bunting of Vulture gave the episode a 4 out of 5, saying the episode "was just a whole lot of fun, and a very fitting send-off for Donald Glover's Troy. We've all known Glover's departure was imminent, and last week's "Cooperative Polygraphy" pulled off a lot of heavy lifting in not only managing a truly funny and emotionally appropriate farewell to Pierce, but in setting a new path for Troy, whose man-child romps with Abed had perhaps become a tad stagnant."

Gabrielle Moss of TV Fanatic gave the episode a 4.9 out of 5, saying "we're all Abed; we aren't seeing actual lava on the floor (well, most days), but we need fantasy not as escapism, but to carry us through the feelings we're sure no one else is feeling; to allow us to fight our battles and experience our emotions in ways that won't get us dumped or arrested or ruin yet another Christmas. We're Troys, who need that bit of fantasy to give us the courage to fight our fears, and live our dreams, and make casual conversation with Levar Burton. Community encourages us to embrace imagination's ability to help us survive."
