= Bondage and Beta Male Sexuality =

- Community episode
- Episode no.: Season 5 Episode 7
- Directed by: Tristram Shapeero
- Written by: Dan Guterman
- Production code: 507
- Original air date: February 27, 2014

Guest appearances
- Jonathan Banks as Professor Buzz Hickey; John Oliver as Dr Ian Duncan

Episode chronology
← Previous "Analysis of Cork-Based Networking"	Next → "App Development and Condiments"
- Community season 5

"Bondage and Beta Male Sexuality" is the seventh episode of the fifth season of Community, and the 91st episode overall in the series. It originally aired on February 27, 2014 on NBC; and is written by Dan Guterman and directed by Tristram Shapeero. It is also the first episode of the season to air after a hiatus due to the 2014 Winter Olympics; the last episode to air was "Analysis of Cork-Based Networking", which aired on January 30, 2014.

The episode was met with generally positive reviews, with many commenting on the emotional depth presented between the characters. However, despite positive reviews, the episode was watched by 2.56 million viewers and attained an 18-49 rating of 1.0.

== Plot ==
Ian (John Oliver) asks for advice from Jeff (Joel McHale) on seducing Britta (Gillian Jacobs). On Jeff's recommendation, Ian tells Britta that he is going to a function for a political cause Britta cares about, and she decides to go with him. While there, she reconnects with old anarchist friends and realizes how they've changed. While watching Britta reconnect with her friends, Jeff soon becomes aroused by her, admitting to Ian that Britta's popularity turns him on. Ian sees this as a challenge and tells Jeff that if Britta's friends blow her off, he will be her shoulder to cry on. This soon happens when Britta's friends mock her for maintaining radical tendencies while they have become bourgeois. While Ian drives Britta home, they discuss the strange and fleeting nature of friendships, and he admits that Jeff is his only real friend, not an extremely close one at that. Ian ultimately decides not to take advantage of Britta's emotional vulnerability; instead he drives her home and goes out drinking with Jeff, which ends up strengthening their friendship.

Meanwhile, Abed (Danny Pudi) carelessly damages Professor Hickey's (Jonathan Banks) drawings with foam shot from his Kick-Puncher costume. Hickey decides to punish him by handcuffing him to his filing cabinet so that he will miss that night's premiere of the newest Kick-Puncher movie. Hickey shows his older cartoons to Abed, who pretends to like them so that he will let him go. When Hickey refuses to do so, Abed angrily admits that he thinks the cartoons are insipid and pointless and that Hickey envies his creativity. Later Abed returns and shows Hickey an unintentionally funny script he has written, suggesting they could collaborate to improve each other's writing.

Chang (Ken Jeong)—while at the function with Jeff, Britta, Ian, Shirley (Yvette Nicole Brown), and Annie (Alison Brie)—walks through an unmarked door and performs an impromptu one-man show for an unknown audience. Afterward, a janitor tells him that 24 people were killed in the same room he just performed in, making Chang believe that his "audience" consisted of ghosts. The audience then says that the janitor is the real ghost; the suspense becomes too much for Chang, who screams and runs. The next day, he tells the study group about what happened, and they say that they did not remember Chang being at the function, which leads Chang to think that he is a ghost. Britta then encourages Ben to calm down, and he does. Suspenseful music builds up as the camera zooms in on an old-fashioned-looking black-and-white group photo featuring Chang—a reference to the climactic scene of The Shining. The caption of the photo is revealed, reading: "Old Timey Photo Club, 2014".

In the credits scene, dean Pelton (Jim Rash) is asked for a restaurant recommendation by Ian, who the dean manipulates not to go to his preferred restaurant by awkwardly avoiding the question and playing along with an emotional breakdown about Ian's neglectful father.

== Reception ==
=== Ratings ===
Upon airing, episode was watched by 2.56 million American viewers, and received an 18-49 rating/share of 1.0/3. The show placed third in its timeslot behind The Big Bang Theory and American Idol; and twelfth for the night.

Including DVR playback, the episode's 18-49 rating increased to 1.6.

=== Critical reception ===
The episode was received positively by most critics, mainly due to its emotional depth. Emily VanDerWerff of The A.V. Club gave the episode a positive review, grading it an A, saying "Community slips pretty easily between outright silliness and bittersweet optimism (along with everything in between), depending on the week. “Bondage And Beta Male Sexuality” slides all the way over to the “bittersweet” side of the scale and makes camp there, but that’s fine with me. Bittersweet optimism is my most favorite of tones, and always has been. That Community can still pull it off (on a somewhat regular basis, no less) is a good sign for its creative renewal."

Eric Goldman of IGN gave the episode an 8 out of 10, saying "This was an offbeat episode, even by Community' standards and felt a bit disjointed. However, it helped to humanize Duncan and gave Hickey and Abed an unlikely bonding session – albeit a pretty serious one! It didn't all work and felt a bit out of sync tonally, but I admire the show for not playing it safe."

Gabrielle Moss of TV Fanatic gave the episode a highly positive review, rating it 4.8 out of 5, saying "Community Season 5 wants you to feel real things, even as it delivers perfectly crafted jokes about cop movies and Dane Cook—and Community Season 5 Episode 7 was perhaps the show's finest achievement in the field of actually, you know, feeling stuff." She also commented positively on Abed and Hickey's roles, saying "Abed's interaction with Hickey, in fact, might have been the sharpest emotional moment in the show's history. The idea of replacing Troy with Hickey seems completely counter-intuitive at first; Hickey is a grizzled ex-cop, Troy is someone who joyfully named a monkey "Annie's Boobs." But Jonathan Banks's Hickey absolutely burned through his first performance as Abed's tough love father figure. Watching them go at it, I didn't think I was watching my favorite Community moment of the year—I was watching the best five minutes of network television that I've seen this season."

Not all the reviews were positive, however; Tim Surette of TV.com gave the episode a negative review, saying ""Bondage and Beta Male Sexuality," which might be my least favorite Community episode title EVER, tried to land an emotional punch and took a swing at our sensitive spots, but missed badly and gouged out our eyes instead. And yes, I am being a little melodramatic. But dammit, we've seen Community do touchy-feely so much better than this. The main problem was that "Bondage and Beta Male Sexuality" assembled some odd character pairings—Britta and Duncan, Abed and Hickey—in an attempt to create weird bonds between regular favorites and recurring characters, instead of keeping the action within the group. It says something that, in an episode that was meant to be so heartwarming, Abed staring at an empty chair for half a second was the most emotional moment BY FAR."
