= Analysis of Cork-Based Networking =

- Community episode
- Episode no.: Season 5 Episode 6
- Directed by: Tristram Shapeero
- Written by: Monica Padrick
- Production code: 506
- Original air date: January 30, 2014

Guest appearances
- Jonathan Banks as Professor Buzz Hickey; John Oliver as Dr. Ian Duncan; Brie Larson as Rachel; Nathan Fillion as Bob Waite; Kumail Nanjiani as Lapari; Paget Brewster as Debra Chambers; Robert Patrick as Waldron; Katie Leclerc as Carol; Jerry Minor as Jerry; Eddie Pepitone as Crazy Schmidt; Erik Charles Nielsen as Garrett

Episode chronology
← Previous "Geothermal Escapism"	Next → "Bondage and Beta Male Sexuality"
- Community season 5

"Analysis of Cork-Based Networking" is the sixth episode of the fifth season of Community, and the 90th episode overall in the series. It originally aired on January 30, 2014, on NBC; and is written by Monica Padrick and directed by Tristram Shapeero. It is also the last episode of the season to air before going on hiatus during the 2014 Winter Olympics. The season resumed on February 27, 2014.

The episode also featured the return of Brie Larson as Rachel, who last appeared in the fourth season episode "Herstory of Dance."

In this episode, Annie Edison (Alison Brie) and Professor Buzz Hickey (Jonathan Banks) confront numerous Greendale heads—including the head custodian Bob Waite (Nathan Fillion)—while others prepare the cafeteria for the midterm dance.

The episode received generally positive reviews, with many praising the show's use of guest stars; however, some noted Troy Barnes’ (Donald Glover) absence negatively. Upon airing, the episode attained 3.01 million viewers and an 18-49 rating of 1.1, placing third in its timeslot and tenth for the night in primetime television.

== Plot ==
Annie (Alison Brie) gathers the group for the first Save Greendale committee, right before the midterms dance. She and Professor Hickey (Jonathan Banks) attempt to have a bulletin board installed, but are faced with Greendale's impenetrable bureaucracy. They attempt to set up a convoluted chain of quid pro quo deals with the head custodian (Nathan Fillion), the chief of IT (Paget Brewster), the head of parking (Robert Patrick), and the Dean (Jim Rash). Over the course of promising favors to each, Annie loses sight of their original purpose, until Hickey sets her straight and the scheme collapses. Eventually, Hickey donates his personal bulletin board and the Dean overrides the custodians' objections.

Meanwhile, Jeff (Joel McHale), Shirley (Yvette Nicole Brown), Chang (Ken Jeong), and Duncan (John Oliver) set the decorations for the dance. Chang suggests the theme "Bear Down For Midterms", which the others do not understand but reluctantly agree to. After all of the decorations are finished, Neil (Charley Koontz) enters and reacts negatively to the theme, since it makes light of a gruesome bear attack at a little boy's birthday party in Wisconsin that was on the news earlier that day. Chang realizes that this was his subconscious inspiration for the theme. As a last resort, they change the bear theme to "Fat Dog For Midterms", insisting that the term "fat dog" is a real phrase which means to relax like a fat dog on a hot summer day. The group mention to Annie there is even an article on Wikipedia about it. However, their ruse is discovered by Garrett, causing pandemonium.

Meanwhile, Abed (Danny Pudi) spoils Britta's (Gillian Jacobs) recent favorite show, Bloodlines of Conquest, and in retaliation, she determines to spoil the books for him. He foils her efforts by wearing ear protection. This catches the eye of a red-headed deaf girl (Katie Leclerc). After Abed shows interest in her, even becoming conversant in ASL in only a day, it is revealed that Britta has bribed her to spoil the ending of Bloodlines of Conquest in sign language. Abed is devastated and storms out, only to reencounter Rachel (Brie Larson) the coat check girl; he apologizes for never calling her and invites her to dinner.

In the credits scene, Prof. Duncan tries to call Greendale Faculty Office Supplies for new staples, but accidentally directs himself to a military line and activates the "Arcadia Protocol". The sound of low-flying military jet aircraft is heard, and Duncan discovers that the staples were right in front of him.

== Production ==
This is the final episode of the season to air before going on hiatus during the 2014 Winter Olympics in Sochi, Russia; the season then resumed on February 27, 2014.

The episode features several guest stars, including Nathan Fillion as Greendale's head custodian Bob Waite; Paget Brewster as Debra Chambers, head of the IT department; and Robert Patrick as Waldron, the parking lot head security guard. Chang had previously named Nathan Fillion as his "same-sex celebrity crush."

== Reception ==
=== Ratings ===
The episode hit season lows in viewers, with 3.01 million American viewers watching the episode, and receiving an 18-49 rating/share of 1.1/3. The show placed third in its timeslot and tenth for the night.

=== Critical reception ===
The episode received positive reviews from critics. Eric Goldman of IGN gave the episode an 8.8 out of 10, signifying positive reviews, saying "On one hand, “Analysis of Cork-Based Networking" felt a bit all over the place. On the other hand, it was delightfully all over the place, delivering plenty of really funny bits and great lines in the process. And I can't stop singing, “It’s not made up! It’s not made up!”"

Emily VanDerWerff from The A.V. Club gave the episode a B+, saying

"After season five took a little detour from what appeared to be its main story in favor of two arcs designed to say goodbye to important characters in the show’s run and a David Fincher-esque concept episode, Community gets back on track with the committee to improve Greendale plot in “Analysis Of Cork-Based Networking,” which centers on getting a bulletin board hung and preparing for yet another school dance. It’s a good episode and a funny one, and it’s probably what the season needed right now. I’ve liked the last string of episodes quite a bit, but the show usually works best when it can balance out the concept episodes with some standard issue campus hijinks. “Networking” is about as standard issue as the show gets anymore, which is to say that it ends with Chang teaching everyone a dance called the Fat Dog and Garrett screaming, “IT’S A BEAR DANCE!” (So, it ends well.)"

Gabrielle Moss of TV Fanatic gave the episode a 4.4 out of 5, saying "For their first Troy-less episode, Community pulled out all the stops. And by 'pull out all the stops,' I mostly mean 'put Castle in a custodial suit.' But hey, that's nothing to sneeze at! Even though [it] wasn't the most enthralling episode of Community Season 5, the half hour was a solid piece of Greendale weirdness, which would have succeeded without any guest spots at all."

Dave Bunting of Vulture gave the episode 4 stars out of 5, saying

"Community achieved something tonight that I didn’t think would be possible in the fifth season of any show: It actually felt new, like a new version of itself. “Analysis” had the same flavor — essence — of the first two seasons, which I suppose is appropriate, considering the first episode of the season was literally titled “Repilot.” Sure, there were a lot of guest stars (Criminal Minds’ Paget Brewster; Robert Patrick; Nathan Fillion [right on the tail of Chang’s celebrity crush confession, no less]; Brie Larson), a move typically reserved for struggling shows looking for a bump and/or renewal consideration, but they weren't too flashy or pointed (I don’t think a single one of them claimed more than a minute of screen time). But this episode felt crisp and rejuvenated … and damn funny."

He also commented positively on Abed's role in the episode, especially after Troy's departure, saying "I was a bit worried that tonight would be more Abed analysis, that we’d have to do more work with him to understand Troy’s absence, and I was very relieved that that wasn’t the case. Naturally, Abed has a void to fill, so he’s a bit more outgoing, at first with the deaf student and finally with Brie Larson’s returning coat-check girl (once the first one proves to be Britta’s ultimate spoiler weapon; well played, Britta)."

In regard to Katie Leclerc's appearance as a deaf student who befriends Abed, Laurel Brown of Zap2it called it "a possible match made in silent heaven." However, overall, she gave the episode a negative review, specifically noting Troy's absence from the series, saying the show "has lost Troy Barnes, and not even a parade of high-end guest stars can fill the man's empty seat at the study-room table. It's too bad, because bringing in actors like Nathan Fillion, Katie Leclerc, Robert Patrick, Paget Brewster and more should have made "Analysis of Cork-Based Networking" one of the best "Community" episodes ever. As it is, the whole thing falls a bit flat."
