= Basic Story =

- Community episode
- Episode no.: Season 5 Episode 12
- Directed by: Jay Chandrasekhar
- Written by: Carol Kolb
- Production code: 512
- Original air date: April 10, 2014

Guest appearances
- Jonathan Banks as Professor Buzz Hickey; John Oliver as Dr Ian Duncan; Brady Novak as Richie Countee; Jeremy Scott Johnson as Carl Bladt; Michael McDonald as Ronald Mohammad; James Michael Connor as the Subway Rep; Richard Erdman as Leonard; Dino Stamatopoulos as Starburns; Jared Fogle as himself; Chris Elliott as Dean Russell Borchert (photo; uncredited)

Episode chronology
← Previous "G.I. Jeff"	Next → "Basic Sandwich"
- Community season 5

"Basic Story" is the twelfth and penultimate episode of the fifth season of Community, it is also the 96th episode overall in the series. It originally aired on April 10, 2014 on NBC. The episode was written by Carol Kolb, making this her series writing debut, and it was directed by Jay Chandrasekhar. The episode is Part 1 of a two-part season finale; Part 2 ("Basic Sandwich") aired on April 17, 2014 on NBC.

Despite receiving generally positive reviews, the episode maintained season lows of the previous week of 0.9/3 in the 18-49 rating/share demo, but increased slightly to 2.56 million American viewers.

== Plot ==
The Save Greendale committee shares a moment of quiet after completing a large portion of their tasks. Abed (Danny Pudi) is uneasy because he thinks this is a misleading lull in excitement. Dean Pelton (Jim Rash) then enters to explain that an insurance appraiser will be arriving the next day to determine the value of the school. Abed interprets this news as a crisis, but Jeff (Joel McHale) takes him aside to placate him by explaining there is no crisis and thus no story. Abed seemingly agrees, saying, “So be it. Let the lack of story--.” He abruptly walks away mid-sentence, leaving the camera to pan to a student who is noisily sipping soup at his desk, implying to the audience that there is no story.

Abed realizes he is in a story when he catches himself explaining that there is no story. He attempts to fool the camera he thinks is following him by running away but to no avail. He falls to his knees, helplessly admitting that everything is a story. A white-bearded version of Abed suddenly appears and tells him to keep fighting the story until it falls apart. Abed goes into an existential breakdown as Leonard (Richard Erdman) passes by to say, “Unsubscribe.”

The city’s insurance appraiser Ronald Mohammad (Michael McDonald) then arrives to assess the campus’s liability, entering the school to perform his inspection. In his last safety test, he attempts to rock a vending machine back and forth to see if it will fall down and crush him. Satisfied that the vending machine will not fall, he declares the school has passed his evaluation. He explains to the committee and the school board guys (Carl and Richie) that the school has value. Carl and Richie then plan to sell the school to a private bidder. The group reacts with stunned silence as Abed returns, ironically saying that the school is now story-free and that they can be content now forever. Dean Pelton then tries to tip the vending machine over on himself, but Jeff pulls him off saying that he can’t do so because they fixed it when they saved Greendale. Jeff comes to the realization that their efforts this year inadvertently led to Greendale being sold.

The Greendale campus is bought by Subway and transformed into Subway University in preparation for its sale. Annie (Alison Brie) fails to convince the committee to launch a social media campaign by tweeting “#SaveGreendale.” Right before Jeff bangs the gavel for the last Save Greendale committee meeting, Chang (Ken Jeong) reveals himself as a spy for Subway and dances away while singing “Five Dollar Footlong.” Annie and Abed then arrive at Dean Pelton’s office to help him pack. Abed notices an engraved plate on the picture of the first dean, Russell Borchert (Chris Elliott), which says “The Truth Is Behind This Picture.” They remove the picture frame to reveal a dusty scroll.

The Subway Executive (James Michael Connor) offers a job to Jeff at the new Subway University, where he will teach “Sandwich Law.” Jeff then walks to Study Room F where he finds Britta (Gillian Jacobs) sitting morosely and listening to her iPod Nano. They talk about what they might do after Subway takes over. Britta says she is worried about Abed and Annie. Nevertheless, Jeff and Britta are both relieved and yearn for a moment of sanity. They reminisce that their experience with the study group started because Jeff tried to have sex with Britta. They both grow quiet as they realize that neither of them is leaving with anything.

Jeff unexpectedly proposes to marry her, saying that this is what people do to keep it all from being pointless. Britta agrees and Jeff kisses her. Jeff says they must first consummate their future on the new table. As Jeff goes to lock the door, Dean Pelton barges in with Annie and Abed, exclaiming, “Buried treasure!” They excitedly announce that they can save Greendale by finding buried treasure on campus and say they must plan an emergency meeting to plan this search. An eavesdropping Chang hears “emergency meeting” but writes down “tomato” on his notebook while laughing maniacally.

In the end tag, Ian Duncan (John Oliver) and Buzz Hickey (Jonathan Banks) are seen having a drink in Duncan’s office. Duncan says he will move in with family in Scunthorpe, Lincolnshire, England, where Hickey says he was stationed. Hickey mentions a pub where he lost his virginity to a prostitute, and Duncan reveals his mother was a prostitute in the same pub. The crisis of paternity is subverted when Hickey reveals his whore had one thumb, whereas Duncan’s mother has two; Duncan says Hickey might have slept with his aunt. Duncan says that he will be staying with his cousin Clive, with whom he says Hickey would get along. Duncan then stares inquisitively at Hickey, implying that Hickey might be his cousin’s estranged father.

== Reception ==
=== Ratings ===
Upon airing, the episode was watched by 2.56 million American viewers, receiving a 0.9/3 in the 18-49 rating/share. The show placed fourth out of fifth in its time slot, behind The Big Bang Theory, Shark Tank, and Hell's Kitchen; and was tied for fourteenth out of seventeenth for the night.

=== Critical reception ===
Dave Bunting of Vulture gave the episode 3 stars out of 5, saying "It's hard to judge an episode like 'Basic Story' on its own merits, knowing that a second half is on its way next week. There wasn't really much to it, hence its title (and Abed's search for a story line), but there were surely some funny bits. The irony of the Save Greendale Committee doing such a good job that they've made Greendale just valuable enough to sell to Subway is pretty bleak, when you think about it, but also a pretty useful setup for whatever National Treasure–based high jinks are sure to follow in next week’s 'Basic Sandwich.'"
