= Basic Sandwich =

- Community episode
- Episode no.: Season 5 Episode 13
- Directed by: Rob Schrab
- Written by: Ryan Ridley
- Production code: 511
- Original air date: April 17, 2014

Guest appearances
- Jonathan Banks as Professor Buzz Hickey; John Oliver as Dr Ian Duncan; Chris Elliott as Dean Russell Borchert; B. J. Novak as “Mr. Egypt“; Jared Fogle as himself; Brady Novak as Richie; Amber Tamblyn as “Thought Jacker” co-star (uncredited); Questlove as “Celebrity Beat Off” Host (uncredited)

Episode chronology
| ← Previous "Basic Story" | Next → "Ladders" |
- Community season 5

"Basic Sandwich" is the thirteenth episode and the season finale of the fifth season of Community, and the 97th episode overall in the series. It originally aired on April 17, 2014 on NBC. The episode was written by Ryan Ridley, making this his series writing debut, and it was directed by Rob Schrab. The episode is the second half of a two-part season finale with "Basic Story", which aired the previous week. The episode briefly served as the series finale after Community was canceled on May 9, 2014, but on June 30, 2014, Yahoo commissioned the series' sixth and final season to be streamed online on Yahoo Screen. This is the last episode to be broadcast on NBC.

This is also the last episode of the series to feature John Oliver as Ian Duncan (who had a recurring role during seasons 1, 2 and 5) and Jonathan Banks as Buzz Hickey (who had a recurring role during season 5).

== Plot ==
In a group meeting to save Greendale, Dean Pelton (Jim Rash) tells Jeff (Joel McHale) and Britta (Gillian Jacobs) about Russell Borchert (Chris Elliott), the wealthy inventor who founded Greendale. Borchert was developing a computer to process human emotion but eventually disappeared with his fortune. Annie (Alison Brie) explains that Borchert's computer lab was sealed away decades ago. Blueprints reveal a hidden level under the teachers' lounge, and they go there to search. However, when Dr Duncan (John Oliver) accidentally shocks himself, Jeff demands they stop. He announces his engagement to Britta; the others protest their decision. Suddenly, Abed (Danny Pudi) discovers a trapdoor.

Chang (Ken Jeong) leads Carl (Jeremy Scott Jones) and Richie (Brady Novak), two school board members, to the lounge, where they find Shirley (Yvette Nicole Brown), Professor Hickey (Jonathan Banks), and Duncan. The others, having entered the trapdoor, search for Borchert's lab. Annie wonders if Greendale is still worth saving. Sensing the true reason for her distress, Abed explains Jeff and Britta's engagement is a crutch to cope with uncertainty. Abed notices a suspicious jukebox, which reveals a secret door. They find Borchert's lab and his gold-lined machine, as well as Borchert himself.

Chang, Carl, and Richie unsuccessfully interrogate Shirley and Hickey until a Subway employee reports they found the trapdoor. In the lab, Borchert is fiercely protective of his computer, named "Raquel", but offers them his leftover money when he realizes their motives. Chang, Richie, and Carl suddenly arrive and take the money. Richie uses a magnet to damage Raquel's hard drive, which controls the lab. The trio escapes before the door closes, trapping the others.

Borchert realizes Raquel's emotional circuitry still works. He mentions how he founded Greendale, which prompts Jeff to find documents proving it. Borchert theorizes that an intense burst of emotion could restart Raquel. Jeff volunteers and tells everyone to turn around as he hooks himself up to the machine. He contemplates the Dean, Britta, and Abed, but nothing happens until he looks at Annie. Raquel quickly powers up, and the door opens. (Note: Dan Harmon later clarified that this was specifically due to Annie, not a cumulative effect from the group as a whole: Clearly, he loves Annie. I mean — no, it's not just because he looked at everybody. I think you know it's Annie. I'll be direct about that. He looked at her, and his heart opened the door.)

Richie and Carl prepare to sign Greendale over to Subway. The group stops the proceedings and presents documents granting Borchert consultation rights on Greendale's endeavors. The Subway rep (James Michael Connor) cancels the deal. As the school celebrates, Jeff and Britta call off their engagement, and Abed muses about next year. Afterwards, the Save Greendale Committee holds a final meeting to commemorate their accomplishment.

The end-tag is a fictional NBC programming promo featuring characters from fictional new programs.

== Reception ==
=== Critical reception ===
The season finale garnered positive reviews from critics.

=== Ratings ===
Upon airing, the episode was watched by 2.87 million American viewers, receiving a 1.0/4 in the 18-49 rating/share.
