= Basic Intergluteal Numismatics =

- Community episode
- Episode no.: Season 5 Episode 3
- Directed by: Tristram Shapeero
- Written by: Erik Sommers
- Production code: 505
- Original air date: January 9, 2014

Guest appearances
- Jonathan Banks as Professor Buzz Hickey; John Oliver as Dr Ian Duncan; Ben Folds as Professor Bublitz; Leslie Simms as Rhonda

Episode chronology
← Previous "Introduction to Teaching"	Next → "Cooperative Polygraphy"
- Community season 5

"Basic Intergluteal Numismatics" is the third episode of the fifth season of Community and the 87th episode overall. It originally aired on January 9, 2014 on NBC; and was written by Erik Sommers and directed by Tristram Shapeero.

In this episode, a prankster dubbed the Ass Crack Bandit wreaks havoc on the students and faculty of Greendale. This leads Jeff Winger (Joel McHale) and Annie Edison (Alison Brie) to further investigate the situation; the episode then shifts in tone after Shirley Bennett (Yvette Nicole Brown) reveals shocking news to Jeff, Annie, and the study group.

This prankster was first referenced in the second season episode "Intro to Political Science," when Annie states "the assailant known only as the 'Ass Crack Bandit' will be brought to justice."

The episode received critical acclaim, with most critics commenting positively on Donald Glover's comical role as a traumatized Troy Barnes after becoming a victim to the Bandit, while others commented positively on the revelation of Pierce Hawthorne's (Chevy Chase) fate; the episode also saw a rise in ratings from the episodes "Repilot" and "Introduction to Teaching," with a total audience of 3.58 million viewers and an 18–49 rating of 1.4.

== Plot ==
When the "Ass Crack Bandit" (whose M.O. is to drop a coin down the back of someone's pants when they lean over) returns to campus after two years, Jeff Winger (Joel McHale) and Annie Edison (Alison Brie) begin an investigation. Dr Ian Duncan (John Oliver) also helps. Troy Barnes (Donald Glover) becomes a victim of the Bandit. Annie is able to deduce from past "attacks" that a teacher is the most likely culprit.

Jeff and Annie are able to track a phone call made by the bandit to the Greendale stables, where they discover former student Alex "Star-Burns" Osbourne (Dino Stamatopoulos), who has been living at the stables after faking his own death (Note: As seen in "Basic Lupine Urology.") and confesses to being the bandit under pressure. However, during a dance in commemoration of Star-Burns' capture, he admits to Jeff that he falsely confessed as part of a bargain with Dean Pelton (Jim Rash), as the dean does not want the possibility that a teacher is guilty investigated. Annie comes to suspect Professor Duncan may be the "Ass Crack Bandit", but this is proven untrue when he becomes a victim himself.

Before the investigation can go any further, Shirley Bennett (Yvette Nicole Brown) arrives and informs the group that former member Pierce Hawthorne (Chevy Chase) has died. The group grieves, the investigation for the Ass Crack Bandit is called off, and Star-Burns recants his former confession. It is hinted at the episode's end that several of the show's main and supporting cast members may be the Ass Crack Bandit.

== Production ==
This episode marks the return of John Oliver as Ian Duncan, who was last seen in the second season. Dino Stamatopoulos also returns to the series as Alex "Star-Burns" Osbourne, having been last seen in the third-season finale.

=== "Ass Crack Bandit" song ===
Musician Ben Folds wrote and performed an original song, "Ass Crack Bandit", for the episode's climax, with backing vocals by Ruby Amanfu. A 4-minute version of the song was hinted at by Folds on Twitter, and then posted on YouTube a month after the episode aired. Folds also appears in a cameo role in the episode, as a botany professor.

== Cultural references ==
The episode adheres to tropes of the crime drama genre, e.g., TV series like The Bridge, Hannibal, and The Killing. Abed also references crime shows that feature the cliche lead characters with mild mental disorders who are exceptional at crime-solving (such as The Bridge and Hannibal), and is later seen deleting said shows from his DVR. The episode is specifically stylized after crime films such as David Fincher's Seven and Zodiac, as well as Red Dragon. Shirley's sons sing the Radiohead song "Creep" in the opening scene in the style of the initial trailer for Fincher's The Social Network. The ending of the episode is similar to the ending of Batman: The Long Halloween, with multiple different characters being shown as possible culprits to the crime.

== Reception ==
=== Ratings ===
The episode was watched by 3.58 million American viewers, and received an 18–49 rating/share of 1.4/4. This presents a rise in viewers and ratings from the season premiere, which was watched by 3.49 million viewers and received an 18–49 rating/share of 1.3/4. The show placed second in its timeslot behind The Big Bang Theory, and seventh for the night.

=== Critical reception ===
The episode was received positively by critics. Eric Goldman of IGN gave the episode a 9.5 out of 10, signaling highly positive reviews, saying "Season 5’s first focused “parody” episode was a standout installment of Community. The Seven homages were terrific and hysterical and this will likely be one of the most quoted Community episodes ever among fans, with one awesome line after another. In fact, it was difficult stopping this review from simply naming one highlight after another. While the focus was on Annie and Jeff, this episode also managed to give pretty much every character at least one great line or moment, including Shirley's 'He should be the run on sentence Bandit', Abed's 'Mildly autistic super detectives everywhere!' run, Chang's backwards butt costume and Britta naming every possible meaning for the Ass Crack Bandit's crimes." He also called Jeff and Annie's storyline in this episode "one of the best uses of this show’s 'Will they or won’t they?' dynamic yet." Also, in regard to the episode's ending with the revelation of Pierce's death, Goldman said "The news of Pierce’s death in the midst of all this was certainly a shock and a bit of a jolt to the system, given the episode was in such a specific zone up until then. That was the point, of course – and Neil’s somber eulogy, followed by “Up next on the dial is Dr. Farts” was hysterical."

Alan Sepinwall of HitFix noted Pierce's death, saying "I'm glad Harmon and Chase were able to work out one final appearance for him before bumping off Pierce, and introducing his death here lent some gravity to all the silliness between Jeff, Annie and the Ass Crack Bandit, whomever he or she may be."

Ray Rahman of Entertainment Weekly praised the episode's use of the parody, saying "the episode was a committed (and thoroughly hilarious) genre parody of David Fincher-style suspense thrillers. And it went full-on macro, venturing into new and unknown regions of the Greendale universe, turning the community college into a Springfield of its own. Not that I don’t like those bottle-episodey group therapy sessions where the only things that are explored are feelings and emotions — those are also great, but these are a little greater if you ask me."

Britt Hayes of ScreenCrush gave the episode a positive review, saying "Of everything in tonight’s episode, Troy might be my favorite, and maybe I'm a bit partial to Donald Glover since he’s leaving us pretty soon, but his Ass Crack Bandit victim with PTSD schtick was beautifully dramatized with a great payoff." She also noted the episode's ending, saying:

"the way this week’s episode builds to its Fincheresque climax — with Annie and Jeff on the cusp of solving the crime during a big student gathering, a couple of clever misdirects, and then the pair losing their bad guy at the last minute — only to slide gracefully into Shirley announcing the death of Pierce was quite moving. It really highlights the way that this group exists in their own little Greendale microcosm filled with adventures (like these theme episodes) that distract them from the realities of everyday life, like old friends passing away. While they were busy trying to find a prankster who likes to shove quarters down butt cracks, their friend was off somewhere taking his last breath. Amid all the clever gags and moments of laughter, this show still finds time to have a huge, beating heart in the center of it all, and Dan Harmon balances it all so, so well."

Emily VanDerWerff of The A.V. Club gave the episode a B+, saying "I was impressed with a lot of it while never quite embracing it as fully as I might have. It’s weird, but after the one-two punch of the one-hour premiere (and after seeing next week’s episode), a little part of me was momentarily irritated by seeing a concept episode, particularly when such a thing used to be one of my favorite reasons to watch the show. The episode quickly won it over—again, it said “butts” a lot—but I found myself kind of wanting more “normal Greendale” adventures going in, and that may have affected my opinion a bit in the early going."

Tim Surette of TV.com gave the episode a more mixed review, saying the episode "was a pretty good Community spoof, ~~butt~~ but it lacked a character story to anchor it to the rest of the season, in contrast to other Community parody episodes like 'Pillows & Blankets,' 'Critical Film Studies,' and 'Contemporary American Poultry.' Don't get me wrong, I loved the episode and I wish I could British high-five it, but it's my job to raise discussion points."
