= App Development and Condiments =

- Community episode
- Episode no.: Season 5 Episode 8
- Directed by: Rob Schrab
- Written by: Jordan Blum; Parker Deay
- Production code: 508
- Original air date: March 6, 2014

Guest appearances
- Jonathan Banks as Professor Buzz Hickey; Mitch Hurwitz as Koogler; Steve Agee as David; Brian Posehn as Bixel; Tim Heidecker as Male Four #1; Eric Wareheim as Male Four #2; Jen Kirkman as a Female Four

Episode chronology
← Previous "Bondage and Beta Male Sexuality"	Next → "VCR Maintenance and Educational Publishing"
- Community season 5

"App Development and Condiments" is the eighth episode of the fifth season of Community, and the 92nd episode overall in the series. It originally aired on March 6, 2014, on NBC. The episode was written by Jordan Blum and Parker Deay, and directed by Rob Schrab. The episode marked the series writing debut of Blum and Deay, and the second episode in the series which Schrab directed.

The episode was met with generally positive reviews, with many commenting on the original homages to Zardoz and Logan's Run; however, despite positive reviews from critics, the episode matched the previous week's ratings with a 1.0 in the 18–49 rating/share, though it improved to 2.79 million viewers – up from 2.56 million viewers the previous week. The episode has often been compared to "Nosedive", a 2016 episode of Black Mirror that also depicts a society in which people rate each other through an app and their social standing depends on those scores.

== Plot ==
Shirley (Yvette Nicole Brown) discovers that Jeff (Joel McHale) has organized a dinner with the study group without inviting her, since she has regular family obligations on the evening when everyone else was free, which causes a small argument between the two as Jeff accuses Shirley of manipulating the group to gain their sympathy. Dean Pelton (Jim Rash) interrupts the conversation and introduces two app designers to the study group, revealing that he is allowing the app designers to beta test their new social networking application, MeowMeowBeenz, using the Greendale staff and students. MeowMeowBeenz allows the user to rate a person between 1 and 5 MeowMeowBeenz.

The app soon becomes extremely popular at Greendale, but Jeff and Britta (Gillian Jacobs) continue to reject it. Britta attempts to convince people of the app's stupidity, but is unable to get people to listen to her unless she has mustard on her face, which Annie (Alison Brie) says distracts from Britta's intensity. Jeff eventually caves in and joins the app after discovering that Shirley has 5 MeowMeowBeenz, which makes her extremely popular amongst everyone on campus and also gives her the ability to influence what people rate others. The campus soon deteriorates into a dystopia, with the Fives and Fours controlling the school, the Threes and Twos serving them, and the Ones being exiled to the outdoor areas of campus. The group of Fives, made up of Shirley, Abed (Danny Pudi), Chang (Ken Jeong), Hickey (Jonathan Banks), and a party animal named Koogler (Mitch Hurwitz), become concerned about the lower levels turning against them and decide to host a talent show in order to give them hope of rising in the ranks. Meanwhile, Jeff, who is now a Four, conspires with Britta to enter the talent show and take down the Fives by exposing their oppressive regime.

Jeff performs at the talent show, but instead of exposing the Fives' regime, performs a hilarious comedy act, which gets him voted into the Fives. With her and Jeff's plan ruined, Britta attempts to expose the regime herself, but no one will listen to her. Britta eventually puts mustard on her face, which causes everyone to pay attention to her and agree to revolt against the Fives. Meanwhile, Jeff is initiated into the Fives, but an argument between him and Shirley causes both of them to be voted down to Ones and exiled from the school. Outside, both Jeff and Shirley admit that they became obsessed by the app and apologize to each other. They are eventually let back into the school and discover that Britta has overthrown the Fives, replacing their regime with her own oppressive system of power where everyone is a One and she rules over a kangaroo court, punishing the former Fives and Fours. Jeff reveals to the school that the app's beta test ended 2 days ago and convinces everyone at the school to delete the app, which is no longer free, reminding them all that they're at school on a Saturday. With the app deleted, everyone leaves the school, leaving a powerless Britta alone. The next week, everyone returns to school and the dean asks that everyone forget the experience, while Jeff and Shirley mend their relationship.

== Reception ==
=== Ratings ===
Upon airing, episode was watched by 2.79 million American viewers, and received an 18-49 rating/share of 1.0/3. The show placed fourth in its time-slot, behind The Big Bang Theory, American Idol, and Once Upon a Time in Wonderland; and fourteenth for the night.

=== Critical reception ===
Critics gave the episode generally positive reviews for its ambitious parody of a futuristic dystopia created because of a social media application. The criticism, however, for the episode came for being "messy" and taking narrative shortcuts that may have detracted from the story. Emily VanDerWerff of The A.V. Club rated the episode a "B" and wrote that the episode felt like the writers "had one good idea somewhere, and then a bunch of other ideas piled on top of it, and, hey, we can get a lot of big stars to appear, so why not? And eventually, the finished product had so much going on that you couldn’t tell what the original impetus for making the movie was in the first place."

VanDerWerff said that it was "probably the weakest episode of the season" despite having a lot of big ideas, some of it wildly funny and impressively original. She said the episode functioned well as a social commentary on "the ways we try to make ourselves look better on Facebook, Twitter, and the Internet in general". The episode worked on a pure plot and character level, wrote VanDerWerff, in exposing our desire to be liked and admired by projecting facsimiles of ourselves in different social media platforms, while subconsciously accepting that those are the versions we want the world to see. "We are, in some sense, reducing ourselves to fictional characters, less susceptible to pain or anger, at least until people needle at us, and we act as if that needling is directly attacking our core selves, instead of just some projection we’ve made to get more popular online."

Gabrielle Moss of TVFanatic, on the other hand, rated the episode 4.8 out of 5 stars, and relished how a social media app transformed Greendale into "one of the season's most delightful fits of whimsy". Moss wrote how the episode spoofs how we are one "poke" way from a fascist nightmare, with wise elders making Starburns run around dressed like the protagonist-enforcer from the film Zardoz. Moss maintained that even though this episode "certainly didn't compare to Abed and Hickey's knock-down fight about the meaning of emotions and selfishness in Episode 7, Abed's argument – in favor of social networking's capacity to carefully quantify social interaction for the socially maladjusted – was one of the more persuasive explanations in favor of social networking that I've heard." She wrote how using a "1970s retro-futuristic sci-fi style" was a great way to prove what "appeared on the surface to be an epic take-down of social networking, proves that the episode was actually a takedown of that evergreen topic, human vanity and greed". She opined that the Community Season 5 is at the show's peak, especially in portraying Britta as "a socialist revolutionary-warlord," and seeing the "show bloom into the complicated, deranged flower that we planted five seasons ago." But it's not all sunshine and deranged flowers, Moss wrote: "If Community Season 5 has a theme, it's about how we can all become villains without realizing it, even as we see ourselves as victims in our own stories. The removal of Pierce and the reformation of Chang has left a villainy vacancy at Greendale, and this season, everyone – Shirley is this episode, Abed and Hickey last week, Britta in Community Season 5 Episode 5 – seems to be trying on the crown...and everyone is finding that it fits."

Brian Collins of Badass Digest rated the episode a "B+" and wrote how Community is great at swinging between a high-concept episode this week after a toned-down episode the previous week without giving its fans whiplash. Collins wrote how this was a strong episode for Britta, who had been sidelined in the first few episodes: "[Britta] suddenly sounds more reasonable when she has mustard on the corner of her lip ('It dilutes or distracts from your excessive intensity,' Annie explains), which of course leads to the actress tossing whatever vanity she may have aside in service of a sight gag where she tries to boost her control over her audience by smearing it over her entire face."

Ben Umstead of Twitch Film gave a mixed review, saying how the episode displayed "interesting experiments in homage, but it was one experiment that didn't fully land". Umstead wrote how the episode started personally and intimately through an emotional rift between Shirley and Jeff, going "on and off the rails so many times that it was merely close to, but never quite a disaster," and ending with some real meaning between the two. Umstead praised the episode's homage "to many a Sci-fi flick from the 70s, most notably Zardoz and Logan's Run, and of course there's a bit of H. G. Wells style future from The Time Machine". Umstead also praised the performance of the "professional party animal named Koogler (played wonderfully silly by Arrested Development creator Mitch Hurwitz)" reigning as a 5 along with Shirley and getting his own Animal House-themed trailer in the end credits. But the episode pushed the plot forward at the expense of jokes: "So much of what works or doesn't will rely on your knowledge of dystopic satires or how much you enjoy seeing comedians Tim Heidecker, Eric Wareheim, and Jen Kirkman as disco-angel stylized 4s." He writes how the episode is "serviceable" because it "goes so deep in the well of Community emotional tropes, as to then feel a little lazy in execution. It means well, but it also doesn't help that the basic dystopic ideas it homages and satirizes have been so overly homaged and satirized already as prerequisites for dystopic fiction anyway as to feel stale... if cute in a way." Umstead pokes fun at his own review, ending by saying, "Maybe I should just take a lesson from Koogler and... assume the party!"

== See also ==
- "Nosedive", a 2016 episode of the anthology series Black Mirror, which explores similar themes of a dystopian society where people rate each other's interactions out of five, although the tone is much darker.
- "Majority Rule", a 2017 episode of the science fiction comedy-drama series The Orville, where the crew visits an Earth-like planet whose culture uses a court of public opinion as a form of criminal justice system.
- "Dot and Bubble", a 2024 episode of British science fiction series Doctor Who, features themes of the effects of social media on society, racism, and elitism.
