= Introduction to Teaching =

- Community episode
- Episode no.: Season 5 Episode 2
- Directed by: Jay Chandrasekhar
- Written by: Andy Bobrow
- Production code: 502
- Original air date: January 2, 2014

Guest appearances
- Jonathan Banks as Professor Buzz Hickey; Richard Erdman as Leonard; Kevin Corrigan as Professor Sean Garrity

Episode chronology
← Previous "Repilot"	Next → "Basic Intergluteal Numismatics"
- Community season 5

"Introduction to Teaching" is the second episode of the fifth season of Community, and the 86th episode overall in the series. It originally aired on January 2, 2014 on NBC; and was written by Andy Bobrow and directed by Jay Chandrasekhar.

== Plot ==
Jeff (Joel McHale) finds himself having difficulty teaching his new class "Fundamentals of Law" and suffering some ridicule from Greendale students due to his nonchalant attitude and demeanor, which is more akin to a student than a teacher.

He shares an office with Buzz Hickey (Jonathan Banks), Annie's (Alison Brie) criminology professor who has been teaching for 15 years. Abed begins taking a class discussing actor Nicolas Cage and whether he should be considered a "good" or "bad" actor. Annie and Jeff begin to fight over Jeff's attitude and unwillingness to take his class seriously. She later enrolls in the class in order to put pressure on him to do a better job. Meanwhile, Jeff and Hickey begin to bond, and Hickey proves to be very intense and threatening. It is also revealed that virtually none of Greendale's professors take their jobs seriously.

Despite his professor's warnings that there is no answer, (Note: As opposed to the question of "Who's the Boss?" in "Competitive Wine Tasting") Abed begins to obsess over Nicolas Cage, being unable to determine whether he is a good or bad actor. He suffers a nervous breakdown in class, inadvertently emulating some of Cage's more "over the top" performances. As he is about to give up his passion for film and the answers it holds, he is comforted by Shirley (Yvette Nicole Brown), who helps him accept that Nicolas Cage's nature is to be inscrutable. The two discover they share a mutual fandom of the Hellraiser movie series.

Hickey suggests that Jeff give Annie "A−" grades on her work, as it will drive a perfectionist like her crazy. He says that teachers invented the "minus" score for lettered grades as a way to give students they don't like the illusion of a lower score even though the "minus" mark has no actual meaning. Jeff opts not to after eventually discovering that he enjoys teaching after he skillfully wins an in-class argument with Annie, impressing and intriguing his class.

Hickey gives Annie an "A−" on one of her criminology projects; she frustratedly decides to drop Jeff's class so she can devote more time to Hickey's. Jeff confronts Hickey, who reveals he did it to try to help keep Annie off of Jeff's back.

Jeff tells Annie that the "minus" is a meaningless grade by teachers who don't like their students; Annie angrily reveals this to other students and quickly causes a riot on campus. Jeff attempts to stop the riot with a speech, only for the students to further turn on him.

Later, in order to make up for the riot, Dean Pelton advises Jeff to start a student-teacher "Save Greendale" alliance, inspired by the fictitious "Save Greendale" cause Jeff created as a ruse. (Note: As seen in "Repilot.") Professor Hickey also joins, as do the other members of the study group. Their first order of business is to ban Dean Pelton from all meetings.

== Production ==
This is the first episode to feature an appearance by recurring guest star Jonathan Banks. It also features the return of Kevin Corrigan as Professor Sean Garrity.

== Reception ==
This episode and "Repilot" was watched by 3.49 million American viewers, and received an 18-49 rating/share of 1.3/4. The show placed second in its timeslot and sixth for the night.

Including DVR viewing, this and the season premiere was viewed by 4.33 million viewers, and received an 18-49 rating of 1.8.

Most critics praised Danny Pudi's performance as Abed in the episode.
