= DC Horror Presents... =

Horror comic anthology

DC Horror Presents... is a horror comic anthology published by DC Comics.

== Publication history ==
The anthology takes place in the Prime continuity of the DC Universe. The first issue of DC Horror Presents... was published on October 24, 2024. It included two stories, one written by David Dastmalchian and Leah Kirkpatrick, and another written by The Boulet Brothers. Dastmalchian also wrote DC Horror Presents: Creature Commandos #1, which was published on October 2, 2024.

The second issue was published on November 30, 2024 and was written by LaToya Morgan and Aaron Sagers. Issue #4 was published on January 1, 2025, it included stories written by Patton Oswalt, Jordan Blum, Brendan Hay and Steven Kostanski.

== Reception ==
The first issue received mostly positive reviews from critics. Ray Goldfield of GeekDad gave the issue 8 out of 10, writing "So far, this series shows some promise, but I'm hoping it sticks to telling unique stories of the DC characters in darker situations rather than leaning on gore and shock value." Nathan Simmons, reviewing for AIPT, praised the issue's writing, art style, and dialogue, but commented that the stories were too short. Justin Soderberg of Capes & Tights gave the first issue 4.5 out of 5 stars.

Nerd Initiative gave issue #4 a score of 8 out of 10.
