= G.I. Jeff =

- Community episode
- Episode no.: Season 5 Episode 11
- Directed by: Rob Schrab
- Written by: Dino Stamatopoulos
- Production code: 513
- Original air date: April 3, 2014

Guest appearances
- Jonathan Banks as Major Dick / Professor Buzz Hickey; John Oliver as Xim-Xam / Mix-Max / Dr Ian Duncan (voice only); Rob Schrab as Cobra Commander (voice only); Michael Bell as Duke (voice only); Mary McDonald-Lewis as Scarlett (voice only); Bill Ratner as Flint (voice only); Mark Rivers as Deep Dish (voice only); Isaac C. Singleton Jr. as Destro (voice only); Dan Harmon as Sleep Apnea (voice only)

Episode chronology
← Previous "Advanced Advanced Dungeons & Dragons"	Next → "Basic Story"
- Community season 5

"G.I. Jeff" (titled onscreen as "Government Issue Jeff") is the eleventh episode of the fifth season of Community, and the 95th episode overall in the series. It originally aired on April 3, 2014 on NBC. The episode was written by Dino Stamatopoulos, and directed by Rob Schrab. The episode was completed in the animation style of the popular 1980s children's television animated series, G.I. Joe: A Real American Hero.

The episode received generally positive reviews, with critics praising the affectionate homage to the childhood cartoon series. Despite positive reviews, however, the episode saw season lows of 0.9/3 in the 18-49 rating/share demo and 2.50 million American viewers.

== Plot ==
The episode begins with Cobra forces led by Destro attacking the Taj Mahal. They are intercepted by G.I. Joe troops led by Flint. Among the force is the study group; Annie, codenamed "Tight Ship", who questions their orders; Britta, codenamed "Buzzkill", who comments on her suggestive outfit with inappropriate language; Shirley, codenamed "Three Kids", who is too busy talking to her children on the phone to focus on the battle; and Jeff), codenamed "Wingman". Jeff shoots down Destro's plane, but takes things too far when he shoots out Destro's parachute, causing Destro to fall to his death.

The quartet are charged with violence, suggestive language, and mature situations unbecoming of G.I. Joe at a court-martial presided over by Duke, Flint, and Scarlett. Wingman defends the first killing in G.I. Joe history by countering it should be their duty to eliminate Cobra because it is a ruthless terrorist organization, but the four are sent to jail.

Cobra initiates an attack of the G.I. Joe base to avenge Destro's death. Cobra bombs a hole in Wingman's jail cell, allowing the Group to escape. Wingman tries to help out in the battle, but ends up killing more Cobra soldiers and accidentally killing Lifeline. However, the Mutineers easily defeat the opposition and enter Study Room F, where Wingman realizes that he works at Greendale as a teacher named Jeff Winger, this cartoon reality is in his imagination, and he is unconscious because he drank a bottle of Scotch whiskey and took anti-aging pills from Koreatown. Jeff refuses to return to the real world.

Cobra and G.I. Joe forces intervene to reveal they have joined forces to become "Jo-Bra" and capture Wingman, as his ability to kill means that he is the biggest threat to both of them. Cobra Commander and Duke ask Jeff questions about real life that make Jeff realize he cannot live in this cartoon universe forever. Jeff tricks them using his jet pack to escape the cartoon and enter reality where he is on a hospital bed, surrounded by the members of the Save Greendale committee. Jeff reveals that he's 40 years old, to no surprise of the group; as they were aware that he was not the age he claimed to be. They nevertheless support him and say he should not have been embarrassed to reveal his age.

== Cultural references ==
The episode was animated in the style of the popular 1980s television cartoon, G.I. Joe: A Real American Hero. Jeff, as "Wingman," adopted the look of G.I. Joe's Duke, though with inverted colors for his costume; Annie, as "Tight Ship," was an analogue to Shipwreck; Abed's "Fourth Wall" was an homage to the Native American G.I. Joe, Spirit; Shirley, as "Three Kids," wore Stalker's costume; Professor Duncan, as "Xim-Xam" (and his twin "Mix-Max"), was an homage to the Crimson Guard Twins; Professor Hickey as "Major Dick," with an eye-patch and costume to that of Major Bludd; Chang, as "Overkill" wore Quick Kick's costume; and Dean Pelton, as "Vice Cobra Assistant Commander", served as a foil to Cobra Commander. During the courtroom scene in Wingman's trial, Scud from Scud: The Disposable Assassin is seen in the background. Fourth Wall's illustration of the layers of reality is a reference to the 1st edition Advanced Dungeons & Dragons Deities & Demigods/Legends & Lore book. The hospital scene where the group laughs and the camera fades to black pays tribute to the light-hearted endings of G.I. Joe cartoons. The end-credits Public Service Announcement by Buzzkill and Fourth Wall is a reference to a PSA from the original G.I. Joe cartoon, as well as the 35 overall PSAs done in the series.

== Production ==
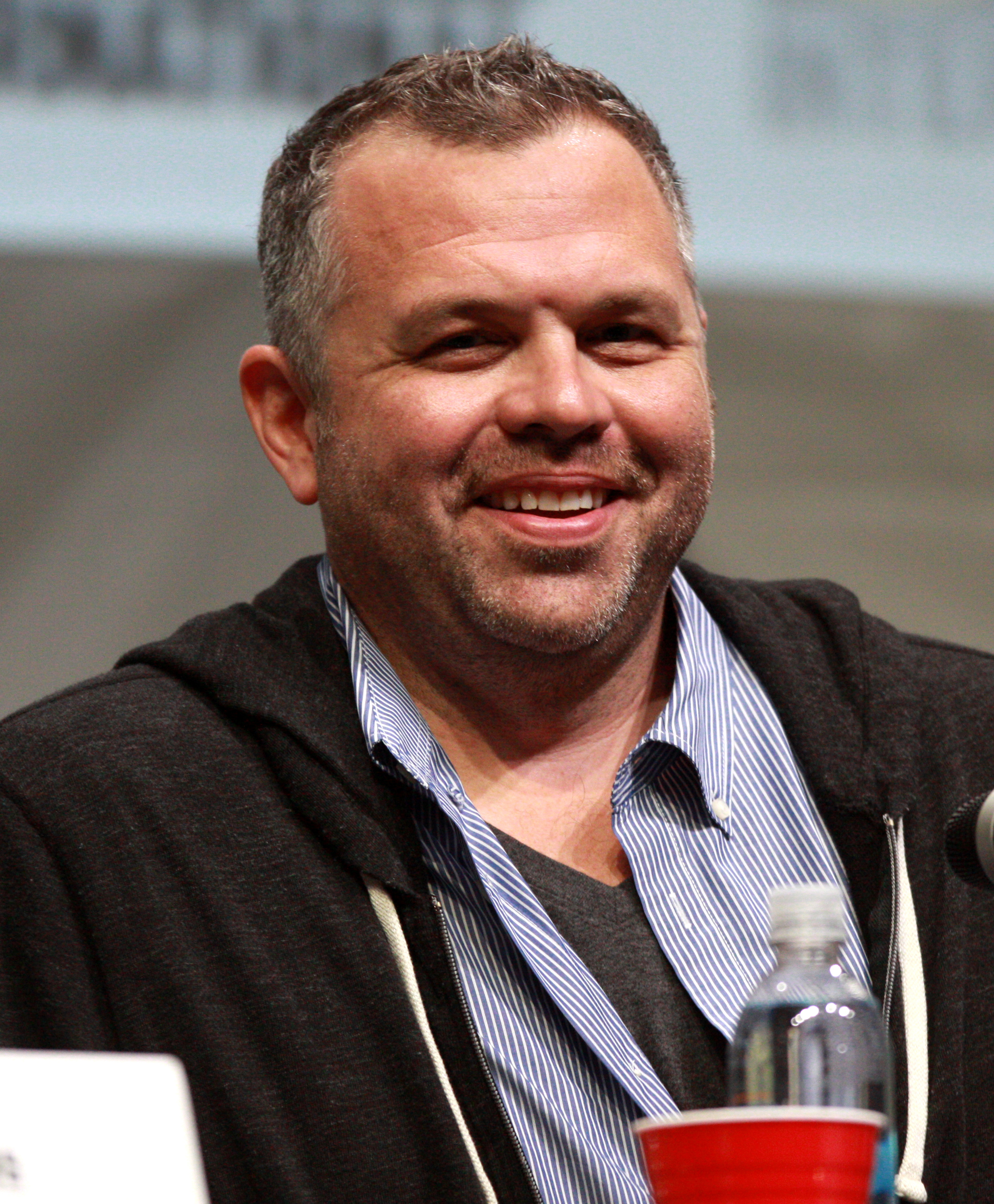
Chris McKenna, executive producer of Community.

Series creator and co-showrunner Dan Harmon initially announced that there would be an animated episode during the cast and crew's visit to San Diego Comic-Con in July 2013. Series writer and co-showrunner Chris McKenna said the idea for the concept of the episode came about in a simple way: "I think Harmon said, 'Let's do a G.I. Joe episode!'" McKenna said that the show wanted to pay tribute to the 1980s animated series: "[G.I. Joe] was something from our childhood that was very important to us and we had fond memories of it, and we thought it would be a cool way to do another animated episode. Like all Community episodes, it takes on a certain style. This one has a very specific story reason for it. I don't want to give too much away, but our characters find themselves on a Wizard of Oz-type journey through the world of G.I. Joe. … There's a mystery that Jeff in particular has to get to the bottom of." McKenna added that the Community team had been working overtime to craft "a loving homage to the G.I. Joe series."

Though production for the live-action episodes had been completed in December 2013, the cast recorded their voices in late March 2014. McKenna said the delay was due to the fact that they broke and re-broke the story several times in order to utilize all the regulars and guest stars in the Community universe, as well as to find a proper justification for using the animated medium to tell their story. McKenna said that Rob Schrab (Scud: The Disposable Assassin) was the "perfect person" to direct the episode and "he's absolutely a maniac trying to get it together." McKenna explained that this episode is not simply a sketch, but that the characters take on this style to carry out a story that takes place in the real world, which Harmon stated was a story was about "age and dying."

The episode was animated by Harmon's animation studio, Starburns Industries, which had previously animated the claymation episode, "Abed's Uncontrollable Christmas". Original G.I. Joe: A Real American Hero cast members Michael Bell and Bill Ratner reprised their roles as Duke and Flint respectively for the episode. The episode was animated with the permission of the G.I. Joe's toy manufacturer, Hasbro. Harmon had this to say about Hasbro's willingness to lend its iconic style:

"The weird thing was how cooperative they were. Not that we maligned their product in any way, but their product is a syndicated, children's cartoon with a different rating than ours, so it's like part of the point of the episode is that there's a different sensibility within this world. So I thought they'd have more problems than they did with the idea of Jeff Winger's G.I. Joe character accidentally killing people. But they were cool with that! More power to them, because they were very, very gracious with their product. That's really cool too, because you're accustomed in TV that if someone pulls out a Snickers bar, it always says 'Snookers.' So the weird thing is that when you see actual branding like that, it hits your brain like it's kind of revolutionary. Which is dumb, because why should that be? But you see the G.I. Joe logo and we have G.I. Joe characters talking to our characters…"

== Reception ==
=== Ratings ===
Upon airing, the episode was watched by 2.50 million American viewers, receiving a 0.9/3 in the 18-49 rating/share. The show placed fourth out of fifth in its time slot, behind The Big Bang Theory, Hell's Kitchen, and Once Upon a Time in Wonderland; and fifteenth out of seventeen for the night.

=== Critical reception ===
Critics gave the episode generally positive reviews, with many remarking on the authentic feel of the 1980s cartoon G.I. Joe. The episode drew criticism, however, due to unfamiliarity of many in the audience with the cartoon to which the episode paid homage. Brian Collins of Badass Digest praised the episode's use of the animated medium to tell an essential story in the Community mythology. He said this episode proved "once again that in Community, there's (almost) no such thing as a throwaway episode." Collins enjoyed how the episode immediately distinguished itself from the 1980s cartoon by questioning the lack of deaths when firing multiple weapons while fighting a terrorist organization like Cobra. He commended the episode for being frank with the viewer from the beginning with the idea that the episode took place in Jeff's mind, unlike the fourth season's finale. Collins noted how this episode compared to the second season's stop-motion episode where Abed had a mental breakdown. The ultimate reveal, however, in this episode that Jeff is in a coma (due to alcohol poisoning mixed with suspect anti-aging pills) made the episode much darker, Collins said. Collins also praised the episode for delivering a grounded piece of canon about Jeff turning 40 years old despite making him a "bit too old" for the 23/24-year-old Annie: "It's a daring move, and the fact that he's been 'lying' about his age doesn't quite land since he's never revealed it in an episode, but it's one of the many things that helps keep the show grounded in more of a reality than we're used to on a sitcom." The reveal is especially poignant, Collins wrote, because Jeff was now the one with the crisis, where previous episodes saw dramatic stories such as Troy leaving (Abed's crisis), Pierce dying (the Group's crisis), and Britta seeing her activist friends move on. Collins ended by saying "it's a goddamn hilarious episode. Rob Schrab (the director of the episode) plays Cobra Commander, and had me laughing out loud nearly every time he spoke - particularly during Destro's eulogy, which he botches because he's never had to give one before now."

Joe Matar from Den of Geek rated the episode "2 out of 5 stars," though qualifying his rating by confessing he "can't even remember watching a single G.I. Joe [episode] and I certainly didn't own any of the action figures." This mirrored the rating given by Dave Bunting (Vulture), who also qualified his rating by saying he "never watched that mid-'80s animated series, and the line of action figures that inspired the cartoon also didn't mean much to me." Similar to Bunting's reason for the lack of connection with the episode, Matar explained that though this episode is a loving homage to the old G.I. Joe action figures, he couldn't "imagine this episode holding that much appeal for you. It certainly didn't for me." Matar criticized the episode's heavy dependence upon "nostalgia and recognition of a bygone era of budget animation and cheesy toy commercials," adding that "either your familiarity with this old junk will be triggered from frame one and you'll be grinning the whole episode or you'll sit there, stony-faced, at times bewildered, like yours truly." Despite his harsh criticism, Matar explained that he understood the irony that the characters were "upset when someone actually dies." Matar resented this "in-joke" as much of the story hinged upon this concept. Unlike Collins, Matar did not appreciate Jeff imagining the entire episode like in the fourth-season finale:

"Something continually upsetting to me is the way Season 5 at its worst reminds me of Season 4, a period in Community's life that I don't even consider to be the same show. But remember the abysmal Season 4 finale where Jeff kind of had a psychotic break and imagined the Darkest Timeline was real and then it turned out it was all a dream? Well, this one makes a lot more sense and it doesn't cheaply hide the 'dream' aspect so as to use it as a twist at the end, but still, it feels lazier than I expect Community to be."

Emily VanDerWerff's (The A.V. Club) unfamiliarity with the 1980s cartoon did not negatively affect her rating, however, as she gave the episode an "A-." VanDerWerff said that though she was too young to have knowledge of the cartoon, she enjoyed this spiritual sequel to season two's stop-motion episode, "Abed's Uncontrollable Christmas". She said that she enjoyed the episode turning into a "weird, Inception-inspired attempt to break out of Jeff's subconscious." She also enjoyed the episode "kept getting more and more ridiculous as Jeff struggled to wrangle everything together into a coherent narrative funny." Like Collins, VanDerWerff enjoyed that the stakes were established early on and that it was revealed that the episode took place in Jeff's head – similar to Abed's Uncontrollable Christmas taking place in Abed's head. She praised the episode for being able to handle darker topics, explaining that Jeff wasn't actively trying to commit suicide, but taking pills thinking it will bring him youth:

"The episode also doesn't shy away from how that act of self-destruction might as well be subconscious suicide anyway. Jeff's horribly depressed about being 40 and having only made it as far as a community college instructor. Even if he's surrounded with friends, he's not in the place he thought he would be when he was a little boy and imagined greater things for himself. Adulthood might carry with it pleasures that childhood doesn't—from naked breasts and Scotch all the way up to deeper emotional connections with other human beings—but childhood carries with it the pleasure of not really knowing how much sorrow and despair the world can hold. That's why nostalgia for the things we loved as children is such a powerful opiate: It takes us back to a place where we knew we were loved, as Don Draper would have it. I'm not saying this episode doubles as a subtle critique of all of those BuzzFeed articles about how great it was to be a kid in the '90s, but I'm not not saying that either. We all get older and have to put away childish things. Getting lost in them can be a danger in and of itself."

VanDerWerff also praised director Rob Schrab's ability to "beautifully [capture] the animation limitations of '80s afternoon cartoons…[and] the flat lighting of '80s toy commercials." VanDerWerff requested to give Shirley more material in future episodes, while appreciating her name "Three Kids" as a joke to how rarely the show gives her more than a catchphrase. Though she found the episode to be "very enjoyable" and "very funny," VanDerWerff lodged a minor complaint at the final scene in the hospital:

"I think works a little too hard to put a cap on everything that doesn't leave the audience contemplating their own mortality…But I still thought the episode built nicely to a place of genuine existential despair and then sort of… shoved it right back down so we could have the standard group hug…It's not a huge flaw—Community has been walking right up to the edge of the howling void and then walking right back with a hug since 2009—but it's one that nonetheless kept me from completely embracing everything that was going on in the end."
