= Bill Ratner =

American actor (b. 1947)

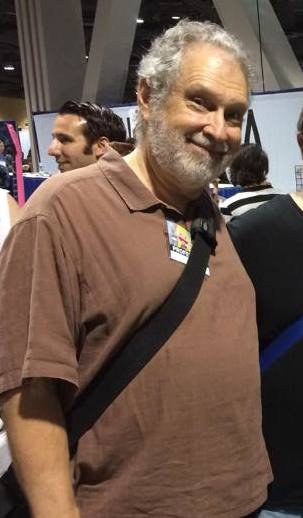
- Born: William Gerald Ratner; February 25, 1947 (age 79); Saint Paul, Minnesota, U.S.
- Occupations: Voice actor, author, performance artist
- Years active: 1982–present

William Gerald Ratner (born February 25, 1947) is an American voice actor, author and solo performance artist. He is best known as the voice of Flint in Hasbro's syndicated TV cartoon G.I. Joe.

== Career ==
Ratner is best known as the voice of Flint in Hasbro's syndicated animated series G.I. Joe. His voice was used in numerous film trailers, including Inside Out, Will Ferrell's Talladega Nights and Blades of Glory, Kung Fu Panda, Mike Myers's The Love Guru, Monsters vs. Aliens, and many more. He narrates documentaries on Discovery Channel, A&E, The Weather Channel, History, and others. Ratner voiced the narrator in the non-canon Ben 10 episodes "Gwen 10" and "Goodbye and Good Riddance". In addition, Ratner is also a voice-over announcer for television stations across the US.

His book, Parenting for the Digital Age: The Truth behind Media's Effect on Children and What To Do About It, winner of the National Indie Excellence Award and a Next Generation Indie Book Award and Eric Hoffer Award finalist, is published by Familius. His personal essays are published in the Baltimore Review, Blue Lake Review and The Missouri Review.

Ratner's performances of his personal essays are featured on KCRW's Strangers and National Public Radio's The Business. and Good Food. He tours nationally for storytelling conferences, and festivals, is a regular competitor in The Moth Story Slams in Los Angeles, is a nine-time Moth StorySLAM Winner, a National Storytelling Festival Story Slam teller-Jonesborough TN, a National Storytelling Network storyteller.

He is a contributing author of the book Secrets of Voiceover Success. He is a two-time winner of "Best of the Hollywood Fringe Festival Extension" – Solo Category for "Bobbywood: Whatever Happened to Bobby the Bellboy?" in 2013 and Voices in my Head: A Life. He is a member of Actors Equity Association, and Screen Actors Guild-American Federation of TV & Radio Artists (SAG-AFTRA) where he teaches voiceover.

== Filmography ==
=== Film ===
Year	Title	Role	Notes
1987	G.I. Joe: The Movie	Flint	Direct-to-video
1989	Lobster Man from Mars	Additional voices	
2004	Fat Albert	Announcer	

=== Television ===
Year	Title	Role	Notes
1982	Meatballs & Spaghetti	Additional voices	Unknown episodes
1985–86	G.I. Joe: A Real American Hero	Flint, Strato-Viper, Chuck, Cobra Officer, Cobra Trooper, Driver	45 episodes
1986	The Transformers	Dashiell R. Faireborn / Flint	Episode: "The Killing Jar"
1997	Ah! Real Monsters	Stu Simmons	Episode: "Clockwise/Gromble Soup"
2005	Family Guy	Flint	Episode: "North by North Quahog"
2006, 2008	Ben 10	Narrator, Baddie #2	2 episodes
2006, 2009, 2019	Robot Chicken	Flint, Gomez Addams, Thing's Boss, Game Host, Crime Boss, George Henderson	3 episodes
2007	Back to You	Announcer	2 episodes
2008–present	Air Emergency	Narrator	Documentary; 9 episodes
2010–16	I (Almost) Got Away with It	Narrator	Documentary; 93 episodes
2011–13	Behind Mansion Walls	Narrator	Documentary; 39 episodes
2011–16	Air Disasters	Narrator	150 episodes
2014	Community	Flint (voice)	Episode: "G.I. Jeff"

=== Video games ===
Year	Title	Role
1992	King's Quest VI	Narrator
2004	Baldur's Gate: Dark Alliance 2	Additional voices
2007	Mass Effect	Ambassador Donnel Udina, Hollis Blake, Krogan Patron
2008	Grand Theft Auto IV	The Men's Room Announcer, Republican Space Rangers Announcer, Split Sides Announcer, Commercial
2009	Grand Theft Auto IV: The Lost and Damned	The Men's Room Announcer, Republican Space Rangers Announcer
2009	Grand Theft Auto IV: The Ballad of Gay Tony	The Men's Room Announcer, Republican Space Rangers Announcer
2010	Mass Effect 2	Donnel Udina, Mess Sergeant Rupert Gardner
2012	Mass Effect 3	Donnel Udina, Angry Krogan Vet
2013	Grand Theft Auto V	Republican Space Rangers Announcer
2016	Final Fantasy XV	Additional voices
2025	Rosewater	Captain Stokes, General LaPorte, Prospector, Rupert Treadway
