= Jordan Blum =

American comic book and TV writer

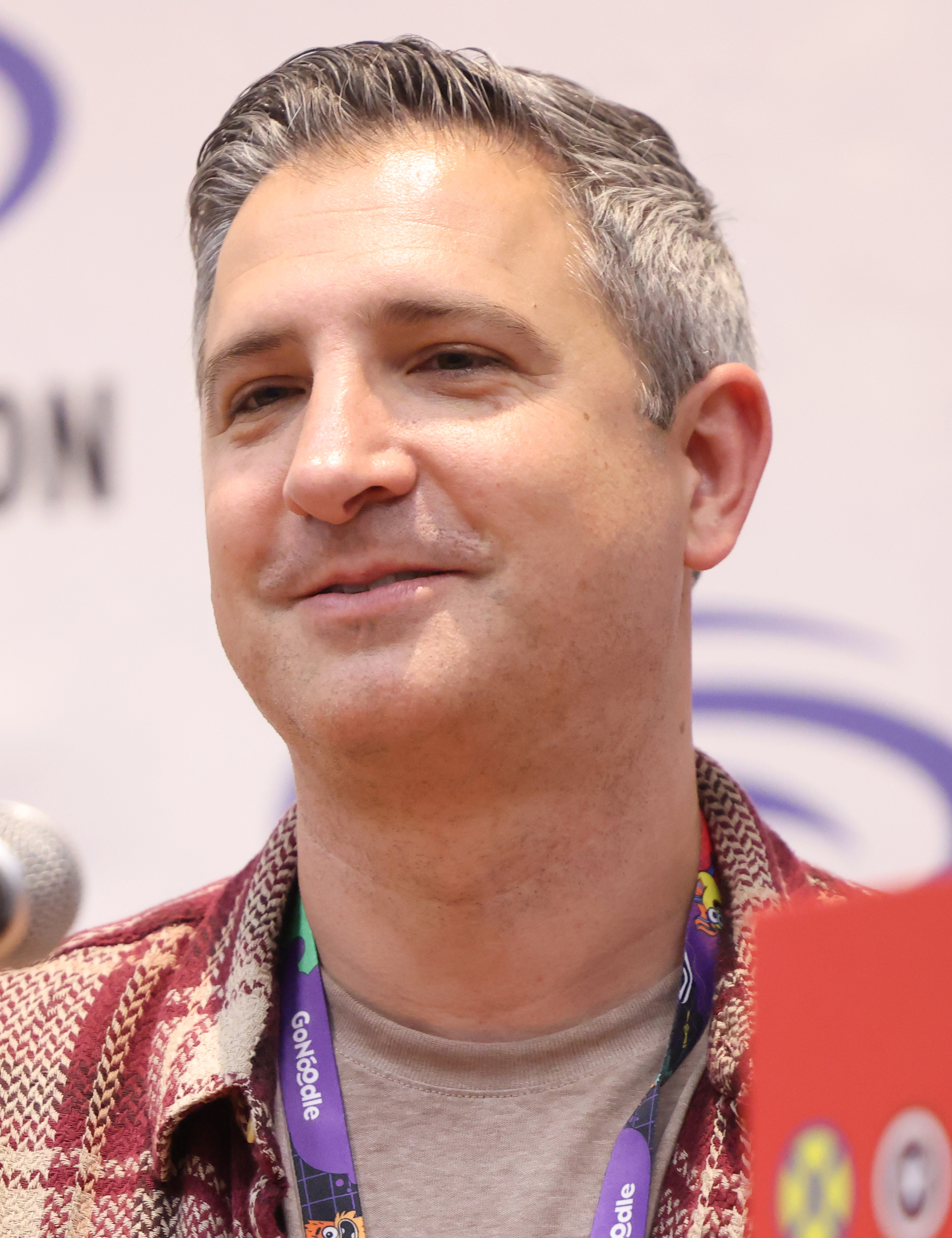
- Blum in 2025
- Born: Jordan Blum; August 30, 1982 (age 44) Somers, New York, USA
- Area: Writer
- Notable works: American Dad, Marvel's M.O.D.O.K., Minor Threats, M.O.D.O.K.: Head Games, Get Jiro

Jordan Blum (born August 30, 1982) is an American comics and television writer. He is best known for his work as the showrunner for Marvel's M.O.D.O.K. and for his work with Patton Oswalt on the comic books Minor Threats and M.O.D.O.K.: Head Games.

== Career ==
Blum started off as a PA and then as a writer's assistant, before becoming a writer on American Dad! and then Community. He had written a pilot for Patton Oswalt for FOX that went nowhere which also had Ben Schwartz in it, so, after a meeting with Marvel, he was able to pitch the idea of doing a M.O.D.O.K. show to him and together they pitched it to Marvel.

"Jordan and I had done a pilot together for Fox that didn't go, another superhero idea," Oswalt explains. "And we'd stayed friends because he's such a great writer and such a deep comicbook fan. And then Marvel wanted to hear a pitch from us because they're doing all these animated shows and we know we had to do M.O.D.O.K., because he's our guy, we both had such a love for him, that's one of the things we bonded over. So we pitched it and they loved the pitch, so we just ran with it."

M.O.D.O.K. was supposed to be part of the larger The Offenders line of adult animation on Hulu before it was cut down to just M.O.D.O.K. and Hit-Monkey. The show was released on Hulu on May 20, 2021, where it got good reviews, eventually getting a 86% fresh rating on Rotten Tomatoes. Despite plans for season two, the show was canceled in May 2022. Due to the show, Blum and Oswalt were invited to write the four issue comic mini-series M.O.D.O.K.: Head Games for Marvel.

Shortly after M.O.D.O.K.'s cancellation, Blum and Oswalt announced that they were collaborating on their own independent superhero comic book, Minor Threats, for Dark Horse. In June 2023, it was announced that Minor Threats would get a spin-off called From the World of Minor Threats: The Alternates, co-written by Tim Seeley. In February 2024, a sequel to Minor Threats was announced, Minor Threats: The Fastest Way Down and in July, the comic was optioned by Netflix, with Blum and Oswalt serving as writers, showrunners, and executive producers. Three more spin-offs were announced in 2024: Barfly by Kyle Starks and Ryan Browne, The Brood co-written by Heath Corson, and Welcome to Twilight, an anthology series with stories from Matt Fraction, Mike Allred, Brian Michael Bendis, Gail Simone, and Gerry Duggan.

In November 2024, Marvel announced that Blum and Oswalt had been chosen to curate a new collection from the Folio Society called Marvel: Unforgettable Stories, which would include ten Marvel comics picked by them.

== Personal life ==
Blum got his love of comics from his father, who learned to read and speak English from comics.

== Bibliography ==
=== Marvel Comics ===
- Edge of Spider-Verse vol. 2 #4, short story "The Last Laugh" (2022)
- Extreme Venomverse #5, short story "Field of Screams" (2023)
- M.O.D.O.K.: Head Games #1-4, co-written by Patton Oswalt (2020–2021)
- Spider-Bot Infinity Comic #1-12 (2021–2022)
- X-Men Unlimited Infinity Comic #62-67, "A World Without X" (2022–2023)

=== DC Comics ===
- DC Horror Presents #4, short story "The Diamond That Steals Back," co-written by Patton Oswalt (2025)

=== Dark Horse Comics ===
- Minor Threats:
  - Minor Threats #1-4, co-written by Patton Oswalt (2022–2023)
  - From the World of Minor Threats: The Alternates #1-4, co-written with Patton Oswalt and Tim Seeley (2023)
  - Minor Threats: The Fastest Way Down #1-4, co-written with Patton Oswalt (2024)
  - From the World of Minor Threats: Barfly #1-4, co-written by Patton Oswalt and Kyle Starks (2024)
  - From the World of Minor Threats: The Brood #1-4, co-written by Patton Oswalt and Heath Corson (2024–2025)

=== IDW ===
- Star Trek #500, short story "I Knew You Were Tribble When You Walked In," co-written by Patton Oswalt (2024)

== Filmography ==
Year	Title	Role	Notes
2011-2019	American Dad!	Writer, co-executive producer	Twelve episodes co-written with Parker Deay
2014	Community	Writer	Season 5: "App Development and Condiments" co-written with Parker Deay
2021	M.O.D.O.K.	Writer, showrunner, executive producer	One season
2026	Get Jiro	Writer, executive producer	One season
