= Alex Rubens =

American television writer (born 1978)

Alex Rubens (born March 25, 1978) is an American writer. He is best known for his work on Key & Peele, Community, and Rick and Morty.

== Life and career ==
Rubens attended Yale University, where he was a member of the improv-comedy group the Purple Crayon. He received a Writers Guild Award for his work on Blake Shelton's Not-So-Family Christmas and four Emmy Award nominations for his work on Key & Peele and Rick and Morty. He co-wrote the feature film Keanu with Jordan Peele.

== Credits ==
=== Film ===
- Keanu (2016) – co-writer

=== Television ===
Episodes listed are those Rubens has been credited as writing or co-writing

- Blake Shelton's Not So Family Christmas (2012) – writer
- Community (2014–2015) – writer, executive story editor
  - "Cooperative Polygraphy"
  - "Lawnmower Maintenance & Postnatal Care"
- Key & Peele (2012–2015) – writer, co-producer
- Rick and Morty (2015–present) – writer, co-executive producer
  - "Big Trouble in Little Sanchez"
  - "Rick: A Mort Well Lived"
  - "Full Meta Jackrick"
  - "Air Force Wong"
- The Last O.G. (2018) – writer, producer
  - "Truth Safari"
- Big Mouth (2018) – writer, consulting producer
  - "Smooch or Share"
- The Twilight Zone (2019–2020) – writer, executive producer
  - "The Comedian"
  - "Blurryman"
  - "A Human Face"
  - "Try, Try"
- Krapopolis (2023-present) - writer, executive producer
  - "Prince Hippo"
