= Repilot =

- Community episode
- Episode no.: Season 5 Episode 1
- Directed by: Tristram Shapeero
- Written by: Dan Harmon; Chris McKenna
- Production code: 501
- Original air date: January 2, 2014

Guest appearances
- Rob Corddry as Alan Connor; Richard Erdman as Leonard; Chevy Chase as Pierce Hawthorne; Leslie Simms as Rhonda

Episode chronology
← Previous "Advanced Introduction to Finality"	Next → "Introduction to Teaching"
- Community season 5

"Repilot" is the first episode of the fifth season of Community, and the 85th episode overall in the series. It originally aired on January 2, 2014 on NBC; and was written by series creator Dan Harmon (after he was re-hired to run season 5) and Chris McKenna and directed by Tristram Shapeero. This is the final episode of the series to feature Chevy Chase as Pierce Hawthorne, making a cameo appearance following his departure in season 4.

In this episode, Jeff Winger (Joel McHale) returns to Greendale one year after graduation to research a potential lawsuit after his practice goes under. While doing this, he finds out what has happened to his friends within the study group since his departure.

The episode received positive reviews, with many critics noting showrunner Dan Harmon's return to the series after his absence from the fourth season; and 3.49 million viewers watched this episode and the following episode "Introduction to Teaching."

== Plot ==
One year after graduating, (Note: As seen in "Advanced Introduction to Finality.") Jeff's (Joel McHale) new law firm has failed. His former colleague Alan Connor (Rob Corddry) alerts him to a potential new lawsuit against his former school, Greendale Community College. The two form a begrudging alliance, plotting to have Jeff infiltrate the school and obtain files that would assist them.

After meeting briefly with Dean Pelton (Jim Rash) while looking for the files he needs for his case, Jeff is reunited with his former study group: Annie (Alison Brie), Shirley (Yvette Nicole Brown), Britta (Gillian Jacobs), Troy (Donald Glover) and Abed (Danny Pudi), and convinces them that he is working on a way to save the college from the lawsuit. He uses this as a ruse to find out all of the negative things that have happened to each of them after they graduated (including Shirley's family leaving her due to her business, Britta ending up as a bartender, Annie becoming a drug rep, and Abed's film degree going nowhere); information he plans on using to convince them all to start their own lawsuits against Greendale. Jeff double-crosses Alan and decides to pursue these new lawsuits on his own. However, Alan alerts the study group of Jeff's intent. After a confrontation, Jeff is able to manipulate the group into going through with the lawsuit anyway, having them sign a contract.

Jeff soon comes to regret this decision, and after happening upon a holographic projection of Pierce Hawthorne (Chevy Chase) in the school's courtyard, speaks with Dean Pelton. Pelton, realizing Jeff is in financial ruin, offers to hire him as a new teacher, to which Jeff reluctantly agrees. Jeff reunites with the study group and convinces them to drop their lawsuit, but inadvertently sets their study room table on fire while burning the contract. They all decide to reenroll at Greendale and pursue new majors, and construct a new table for the study room.

== Production ==
This is the first episode to feature the return of series creator Dan Harmon as showrunner following his season long absence from production. Harmon co-wrote the episode with Chris McKenna, who also returned to the show and was promoted to executive producer this season. The episode was directed by executive producer Tristram Shapeero.

Harmon and the writers of the episode wanted it to be a return to form after the previous season, which had gotten lower ratings and which Harmon had expressed dissatisfaction over. Initially, the writers planned to retcon the entire previous season as non-canon. Harmon originally considered revealing that it had been imagined by Abed after entering the Dreamatorium in "Introduction to Finality". The writers also considered revealing that the previous season had been set in an underground research facility simulating Greendale. However, after two days of brainstorming Harmon ultimately decided to instead have the episode be a "second pilot" which would take the next two seasons in a new story direction about Jeff returning to Greendale as a teacher as the rest of the study group re-enrolls.

Initially, the episode was going to focus on Dean Pelton convincing the six returning characters to build a fake cardboard particle accelerator to fool a visiting US federal government official into giving Greendale a grant to build a real one. Late into pre-production on the episode, Harmon completely rewrote the outline after deciding to make a simpler episode in which the main characters "sit around that table and reestablish themselves as broken people". This eventually led to the idea of Jeff convincing the group to destroy Greendale and quitting his job as a lawyer to teach there after accidentally convincing them to re-enroll.

The episode features a guest appearance by Chevy Chase, who left the show as a main cast member during production of season 4. Harmon thought Pierce's character was needed to convince Jeff to save Greendale at the point in the episode where he was conflicted. As part of his departure agreement, he was not permitted to return to the set, which Harmon had to work around as a constraint. Chase was filmed with a motion-control camera on a different set. To keep the appearance hidden, the crew were only informed if they needed to work on it, and the table read featured an alternate scene in which Jeff meets Star-Burns. The season 3 finale "Introduction to Finality" revealed that Star-Burns faked his death, and the alternate "Repilot" scene saw him telling Jeff he was hiding on campus, despite it being the worst hiding place, because there was something special about Greendale. "Basic Intergluteal Numismatics" later saw his canonical return.

== Reception ==
=== Ratings ===
This episode and "Introduction to Teaching" was watched by 3.49 million American viewers, and received an 18–49 rating/share of 1.3/4. The show placed second in its timeslot and sixth for the night.

Including DVR viewing, this and the second episode was viewed by 4.33 million viewers, and received an 18–49 rating of 1.8.

=== Critical reception ===
The premiere has received generally positive reviews from critics, with most noting Dan Harmon's return to the series. Morgan Glennon of Buddy TV gave the premiere a positive review, noting the show's change from the fourth season, saying "A lot has changed between seasons in the lives of our characters, yet the biggest change is in the writing for the show. Even in the best episodes last year, like "Intro to Felt Surrogacy," things still felt just slightly left of center. With Harmon's return, it feels like the ship has been righted back on course and the soul has returned to the proceedings."

Verne Gay of Newsday graded the episode an A, commenting positively on Dan Harmon's return and creativity, saying "the non-sequiturs, word play, pop culture refs and absolute disdain for anything bordering on sitcom logic are all part of a mad dash through the mind of Harmon, and past all of the stuff he finds so gloriously idiotic."

Gabrielle Moss of TV Fanatic gave the premiere a 4.8 out of 5, saying "The new season of Community is, thus far, brutally funny and also pretty damned brutal – from Jeff Winger's failure as a legitimate lawyer, to everyone's similarly bleak post-Greendale trajectories (Relaxarex!). [...] The show has always pulled no punches about the bleakness of the gang's lives (and life in general), but the darkness was especially notable, [...] with only a few dim sources of real hope. Just like real life!" Eric Goldman of IGN gave the episode a rating of 8.5 out of 10, signaling generally positive reviews, saying "I’m elated to say that “Repilot” is just the beginning of even better things to come for a show that has been able to successfully rebound in a way few others could pull off."

Matt Zoller Seitz of Vulture commented positively on the show's sense of change, saying "Throughout, there’s a sense that Community is building, or rebuilding, toward something big and bold—that what you’re seeing is not so much a revamp as a restoration. Few live-action sitcoms are so aware of their artificiality and yet so singularly alive."

David Hinckley of the Daily News gave the episode a more moderate review, giving it a 3 out of 5. He said "And while it’s too early to tell for sure, Harmon does seem to have brought back some of the show’s earlier spirit. What he’s not doing is making an overt bid for any new, broader audience. Community seems quite happy to party with the friends it already has. And why not? Community fans may be modest in number, but their loyalty, or something, has convinced NBC to keep renewing the show long after by all normal standards it should have flunked out. So Harmon and company may think they’re in bonus time anyhow, and they might as well do what they want until someone shuts off the camera."
