= Jonathan Banks =

American actor (born 1947)

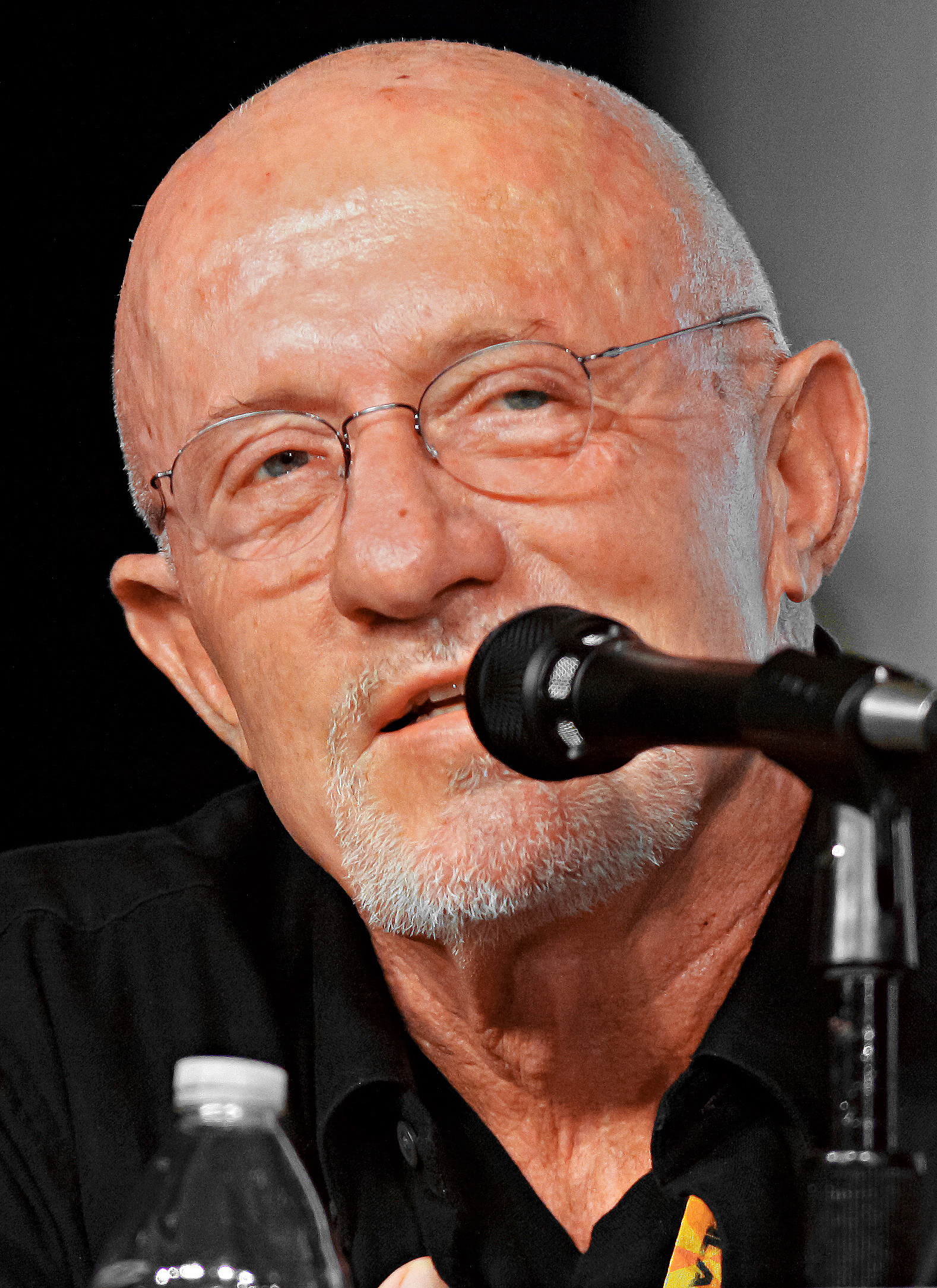
- Banks at the 2012 San Diego Comic-Con
- Born: Jonathan Ray Banks; January 31, 1947 (age 79); Washington, D.C., U.S.
- Occupation: Actor
- Years active: 1974–present
- Spouses: Marnie Fausch (m. 1968; div. 1970); Gennera Cebian (m. 1990)
- Children: 3

Jonathan Ray Banks (born January 31, 1947) is an American actor. He played FBI Special Agent Frank McPike in the television series Wiseguy (1987–1990), for which he was nominated for the Primetime Emmy Award for Outstanding Supporting Actor in a Drama Series. Banks gained renewed recognition for his role as hitman and fixer Mike Ehrmantraut in the television series Breaking Bad (2009–2013). He reprised the role as a lead character in the spin-off series Better Call Saul (2015–2022) and had a cameo in El Camino: A Breaking Bad Movie (2019). For playing Ehrmantraut, he received five nominations for the Primetime Emmy Award for Outstanding Supporting Actor in a Drama Series.

Banks' film projects include The Rose (1979), Airplane! (1980), 48 Hrs (1982) Frances (1982), Beverly Hills Cop (1984), Armed and Dangerous (1986), There Goes the Neighborhood (1992), Under Siege 2: Dark Territory (1995), Foolish (1999), Puff, Puff, Pass (2006), Identity Thief (2013) and The Commuter (2018). He also appeared prominently in the fifth season of Community (2014) and provided the voice of Commissioner Jim Gordon in the video game Batman: Arkham Knight (2015), and Brit in the animated series Invincible (2025–present).

== Early life and education ==
Banks was born on January 31, 1947, in Washington, D.C., and grew up in the suburb of Chillum, Maryland. His father was a civil servant and his mother was a professor at Indiana State University. Banks has said his mother was also secretary in various federal government offices, including the Central Intelligence Agency, and that she was also a private secretary to several top Naval officers, including Admiral Chester W. Nimitz.

Banks graduated from Northwood High School in Silver Spring, Maryland, and attended Indiana University Bloomington, where he was a classmate of actor Kevin Kline. During this time, they participated in a production of The Threepenny Opera together. He also played Anthony Anderson in The Devil's Disciple, which he credits as changing his life. Banks left Indiana University without a degree to begin his theater career, joining a touring company of Hair as a stage manager, traveling to Australia and New Zealand.

== Career ==
=== 1974–1990: Early work and recognition ===
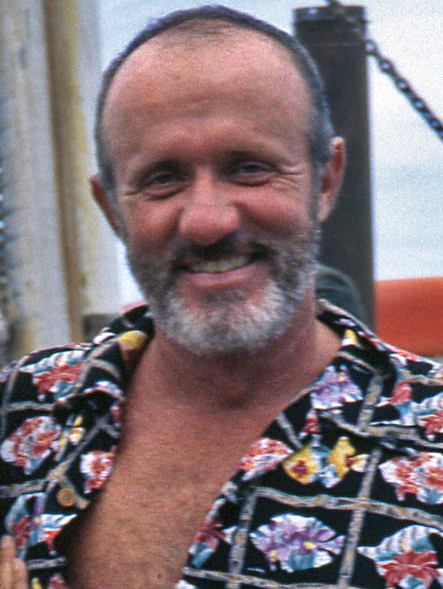
Banks in 1995

In 1974, Banks moved to Los Angeles, where he worked in theater before picking up bit parts. His most notable theatrical role was Frid in the United States tour of the musical A Little Night Music. Also in 1974, Banks acted in the public service announcement (PSA) Linda's Film on Menstruation. Banks' early film appearances include supporting roles in films such as the crime film Who'll Stop the Rain (1978), the murder-mystery The Cheap Detective (1978), the war film Coming Home (1978), and the musical drama The Rose (1979). During the late 1970s and early 1980s, he appeared in television films such as The Girl in the Empty Grave (1977), Alexander: The Other Side of Dawn, The Ordeal of Patty Hearst (1979), She's Dressed to Kill (1979), Rage (1980), and Desperate Voyage (1980).

Banks acted in the prison buddy comedy Stir Crazy (1980) starring Richard Pryor and Gene Wilder and the comedy films Airplane! (1980) and 48 Hrs. (1982). His other performances included Frances (1982), Beverly Hills Cop (1984), Gremlins (1984), Buckaroo Banzai (1984), Armed and Dangerous (1986), Cold Steel (1987), and Honeymoon Academy (1990). His television-roles of the 1980s include the NBC series the Gangster Chronicles (1981), where he played Dutch Schultz, and the short-lived science fiction series Otherworld (1985), where he portrayed the main antagonist.

Banks achieved a career breakthrough with the role of Frank McPike in the television series Wiseguy, which he starred in from 1987 to 1990. His performance led to a Primetime Emmy Award nomination, for Outstanding Supporting Actor in a Drama Series. Although his character was primarily the hero's mentor and superior officer, stories occasionally featured McPike as hero.

=== 1991–2008: Subsequent roles ===
Banks' films in the 1990s included Freejack (1991), Boiling Point (1993), Under Siege 2: Dark Territory (1995), Flipper (1996), Dark Breed (1996), Last Man Standing (1996), A Thousand Men and a Baby (1997), Melanie Darrow (1997), Harvey (1999), Millennium Man (1999), Foolish (1999), Let the Devil Wear Black (1999), Thrash (1999), and Outlaw Justice (1999).

He also acted in television films such as Body Shot (1993) and Shadow of Obsession (1995). In 1994, Banks had guest appearances in the television shows Matlock, Highlander: The Series, Walker, Texas Ranger, and Tales from the Crypt. In 1996, Banks reprised the role of Frank McPike in the television film Wiseguy. His films in the 2000s included Crocodile Dundee in Los Angeles (2001), Face to Face (2001), Downward Angel (2001), Dark Blue (2003), Jam (2007), Reign Over Me (2007), and Proud American (2008). In 2004, he acted in one episode of CSI: Crime Scene Investigation. In 2006, he acted in an episode of Without a Trace, and in 2007 he acted in 2 episodes of Dexter. According to voice actor Nolan North, Banks was originally considered to play the role of Zoran Lazaravić in the 2009 video game Uncharted 2: Among Thieves, but the role went to Graham McTavish.

=== 2009–2014: Breaking Bad ===
In 2009, Banks gained acclaim for his portrayal of Mike Ehrmantraut in the second season of the AMC crime series Breaking Bad starring Bryan Cranston. He became a series regular for the third, fourth, and fifth seasons. For his performance, he received a Primetime Emmy Award nomination for Outstanding Supporting Actor in a Drama Series at the 2013 ceremony.

His films in the 2010s included Identity Thief (2013), Bullet (2014), and Horrible Bosses 2 (2014), Banks had a recurring role as Buzz Hickey in the fifth season of the NBC sitcom Community.

=== 2015–2022: Better Call Saul ===
In 2015, he reprised the role of Mike Ehrmantraut as a member of the main cast in the Breaking Bad spinoff Better Call Saul. Set several years before the events of Breaking Bad, the show greatly expanded Ehrmantraut's character and backstory, and Banks ultimately appeared in 61 of the series' 63 episodes. At the Emmy Awards, he was nominated for Outstanding Supporting Actor in a Drama Series at their 2015, 2016, 2017, and 2019 ceremonies. He has received a total of six Primetime Emmy Award nominations for Outstanding Supporting Actor in a Drama Series (1989, 2013, 2015–2017, 2019) for his work on Wiseguy, Breaking Bad, and Better Call Saul, making him the only actor with nominations as a main cast member for three shows in this category, two of which feature him as the same character.

In 2015, he voiced James Gordon in the video game Batman: Arkham Knight, and was a guest on the MythBusters episode "Supernatural Shooters". During this time Banks acted in the films Term Life (2016), The Commuter (2018), and Incredibles 2 (2018).

Banks portrayed the main antagonist in the 2017 film Mudbound. With his costars, he was nominated for Outstanding Performance by a Cast in a Motion Picture at the Screen Actors Guild Awards.

In 2020, Banks joined the cast of the Netflix animated series F Is for Family in its fourth season as Bill Murphy, father of the main character.

=== Animation roles ===
In 2014, Banks voiced Major Dick in an animated episode of Community, G.I. Jeff. In 2015, he voiced Filbrick Pines in Gravity Falls. From 2017 to 2020, he provided the voice for Quirin in the Tangled franchise. In 2025, Banks joined the cast of the Amazon Prime Video animated series Invincible from its third season onwards as the voice of the elderly superhero Brit. He plays the voice of Brian in season 5 of Phineas and Ferb (2025) and mobster Don Scarfish in the 2026 SpongeBob SquarePants episode "Sounds Like Trouble".

== Personal life ==
Banks married his first wife, Marnie Fausch, in 1968. They had one daughter before divorcing in 1970. Banks married his second wife, Gennera Gonzalez Cebian, in 1990. They had fraternal twins, and Banks has a stepdaughter from this marriage.

Banks was awarded an honorary doctoral degree from Indiana University in April 2016.

Banks's home was destroyed in the 2018 Woolsey Fire.

== Awards and nominations ==
Year	Association	Category	Project	Result	Ref.
2013	Critics' Choice Television Awards	Best Supporting Actor in a Drama Series	Breaking Bad	Nominated	
2015	Critics' Choice Television Awards	Best Supporting Actor in a Drama Series	Better Call Saul	Won	
2021	Critics' Choice Television Awards	Best Supporting Actor in a Drama Series	Better Call Saul	Nominated	
1989	Primetime Emmy Award	Outstanding Supporting Actor in a Drama Series	Wiseguy	Nominated	
2013	Primetime Emmy Award	Outstanding Supporting Actor in a Drama Series	Breaking Bad (episode: "Say My Name")	Nominated	
2015	Primetime Emmy Award	Outstanding Supporting Actor in a Drama Series	Better Call Saul (episode: "Five-O")	Nominated	
2016	Primetime Emmy Award	Outstanding Supporting Actor in a Drama Series	Better Call Saul (episode: "Bali Ha'i")	Nominated	
2017	Primetime Emmy Award	Outstanding Supporting Actor in a Drama Series	Better Call Saul (episode: "Witness")	Nominated	
2019	Primetime Emmy Award	Outstanding Supporting Actor in a Drama Series	Better Call Saul (episode: "Winner")	Nominated	
2011	Screen Actors Guild Awards	Outstanding Ensemble in a Drama Series	Breaking Bad (season 4)	Nominated	
2012	Screen Actors Guild Awards	Outstanding Ensemble in a Drama Series	Breaking Bad (season 5 - part 1)	Nominated	
2017	Screen Actors Guild Awards	Outstanding Cast in a Motion Picture	Mudbound	Nominated	
2018	Screen Actors Guild Awards	Outstanding Ensemble in a Drama Series	Better Call Saul (season 4)	Nominated	
2020	Screen Actors Guild Awards	Outstanding Ensemble in a Drama Series	Better Call Saul (season 5)	Nominated	
2022	Screen Actors Guild Awards	Outstanding Actor in a Drama Series	Better Call Saul (season 6)	Nominated	
2022	Screen Actors Guild Awards	Outstanding Ensemble in a Drama Series	Better Call Saul (season 6)	Nominated	
2016	Satellite Awards	Best Supporting Actor – Series, Miniseries or Television Film	Better Call Saul	Nominated	
2017	Satellite Awards	Best Supporting Actor – Series, Miniseries or Television Film	Better Call Saul	Nominated	
2013	Saturn Awards	Best Supporting Actor on Television	Breaking Bad	Won	
2019	Saturn Awards	Best Supporting Actor on Television	Better Call Saul	Nominated	
2021	Saturn Awards	Best Supporting Actor on Television	Better Call Saul	Nominated	
2022	Saturn Awards	Best Supporting Actor on Television	Better Call Saul	Won	
1990	Viewers for Quality Television	Best Supporting Actor in a Quality Drama Series	Wiseguy	Nominated	
