= Emotional Consequences of Broadcast Television =

- Community episode
- The study group hugging while in Study Room F for the final time
- Episode no.: Season 6 Episode 13
- Directed by: Rob Schrab
- Written by: Dan Harmon; Chris McKenna
- Production code: 613
- Original air date: June 2, 2015
- Running time: 27 minutes

Guest appearances
- Paget Brewster as Francesca "Frankie" Dart; Keith David as Elroy Patashnik; Yvette Nicole Brown as Shirley Bennett; Richard Erdman as Leonard Rodriguez; Erik Charles Nielsen as Garrett Lambert; Danielle Kaplowitz as Vicki; David Neher as Todd Jacobson; Seth Green as Scrunch; Darsan Solomon as Dave; Charlie McKenna as Sebastian; Justin Roiland as Ice Cube Head; Loretta Fox as mother; Wayne Federman as father; Makenna James as sister; Connor Rosen as brother; Dan Harmon as TV commercial narrator (uncredited)

Episode chronology
← Previous "Wedding Videography"	Next → —
- Community season 6

"Emotional Consequences of Broadcast Television" is the series finale of the American sitcom Community, the thirteenth episode of its sixth season. It was written by series creator Dan Harmon and Chris McKenna, and directed by Rob Schrab. It is the 110th episode overall and premiered on Yahoo Screen on June 2, 2015.

The series revolves around a group of friends at Greendale Community College; the sixth season follows them as they create the "Save Greendale Committee" to improve their school. In "Emotional Consequences of Broadcast Television", the group imagines how their next year at Greendale might look. As he hears about his friends' plans, Jeff Winger (Joel McHale) grows concerned over what will happen to him as everyone else moves away. The episode includes many self-referential pitches for what a "season seven" of the show would look like. It also includes a cameo by former cast member Yvette Nicole Brown.

"Emotional Consequences of Broadcast Television" received critical acclaim, many calling it a sincere and satisfying end to the show's run, and praising the emotional weight along with the conclusion of the story. It has been ranked among the best episodes of the program.

== Plot ==
As another school year ends, Frankie disbands the Save Greendale Committee, declaring the school "saved". While the group make summer plans, Elroy reveals that he was hired by LinkedIn and bids farewell, uncertain whether he will return.

At a bar, the characters imagine various "season seven" scenarios set in the study room. Abed illustrates their tropes but questions whether they will return for another year. Pelton, the college's dean, struggles to articulate his pitch with Shirley, Elroy and a third Black character. Chang imagines Ice Cube Head, who eats phones and zaps people with his powers. Jeff is about to leave in boredom when Annie arrives with news of an FBI internship in Washington, D.C., and doubt over her return. Jeff imagines himself stuck around a table with secondary characters arguing: Vicki, Garrett, Leonard, Todd, Dave, and the new tech billionaire Scrunch.

Now keen to join the conversation, Jeff suggests the seventh season shows Annie as an FBI agent investigating the murder of Britta's parents. Britta pitches a political storyline about war with the government, and Pelton is offended as Britta depicts him as a transgender woman. Abed compares television to friendship, saying its purpose is providing comfort. Jeff then suggests they all become teachers, with himself as the dean and Pelton as a trainee dean. The others agree until Abed announces he has secured a production assistant role on a television show in Los Angeles.

Jeff returns to the study room and imagines raising a child with Annie, who questions whether he really wants that. The real Annie enters and they share desires for each other's youth and maturity, sharing a kiss. The rest of the group arrive and they all hug, picturing their idyllic season seven. Jeff imagines himself with attractive women and emotional security. Later, he drops Annie and Abed at the airport and rejoins the others at the bar.

The screen fades to black with the hashtag #andamovie. The end tag features a commercial with a family playing the fictional Community board game, narrated by Dan Harmon. The son reveals a script for the commercial itself. The dad explains that they do not exist. The family sits in shocked silence as Harmon delivers a fourth wall-breaking monologue about the game, Community, and his own shortcomings.

== Production ==
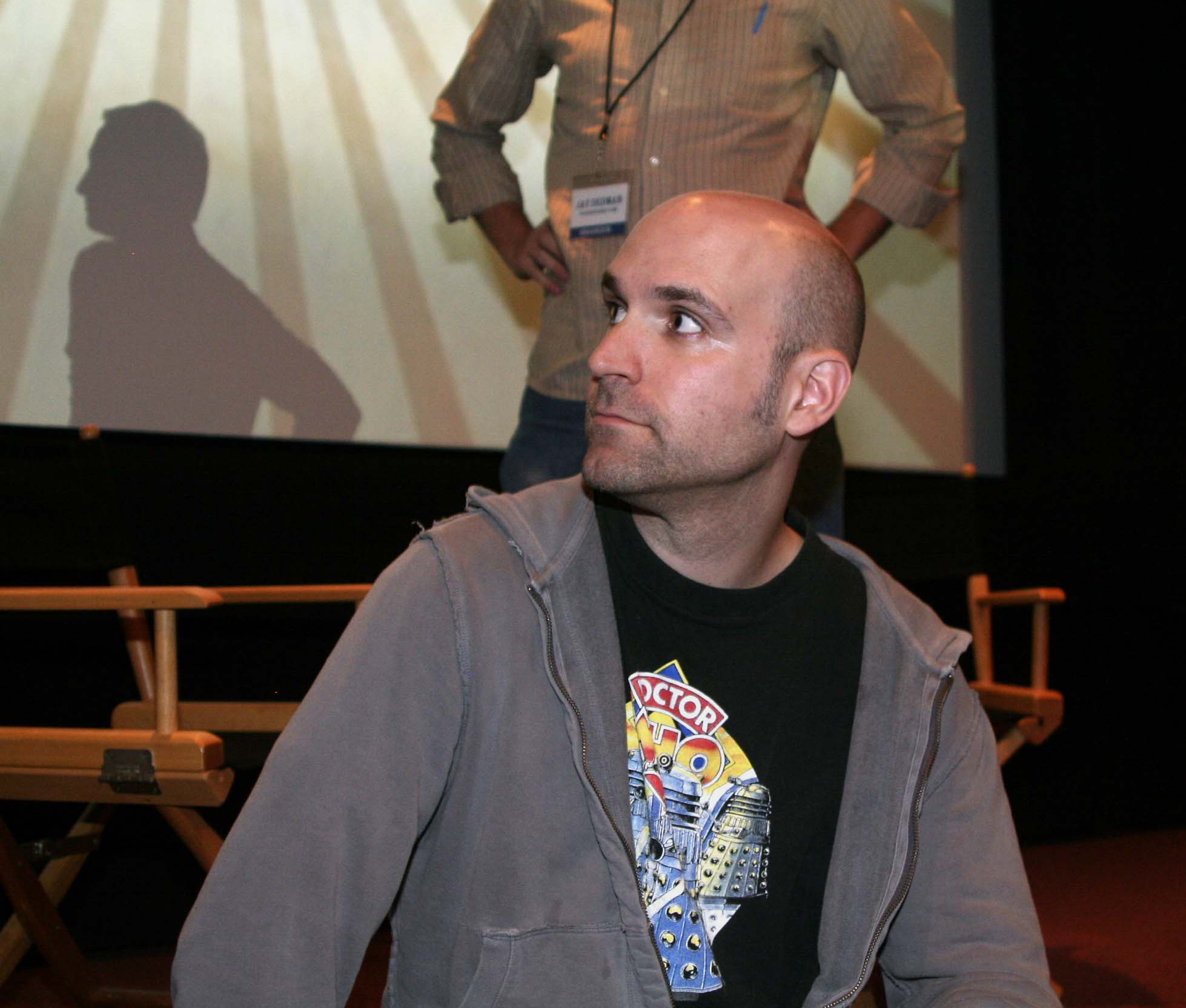
Director Rob Schrab at the 2007 Pixelodeon

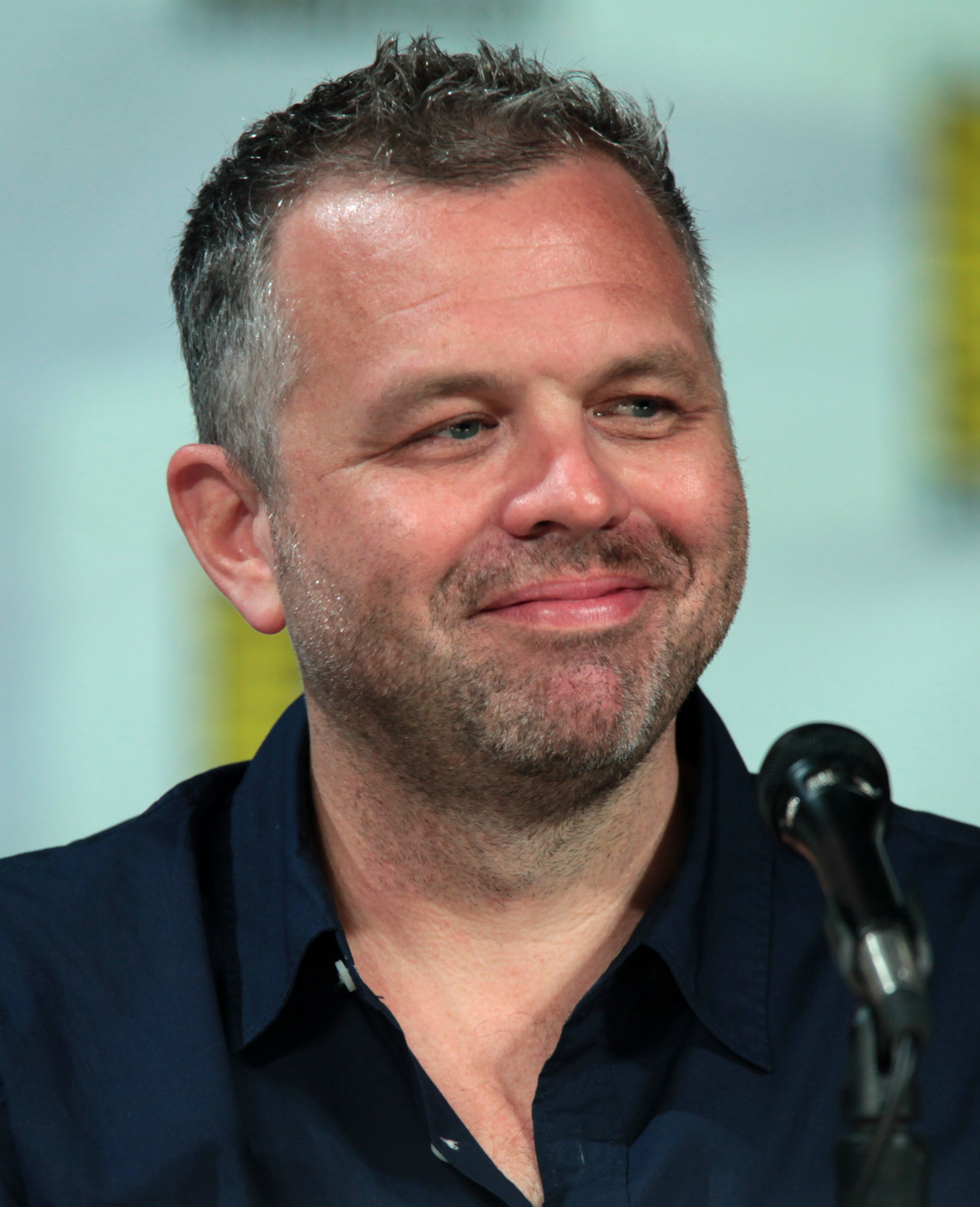
Co-writer Chris McKenna at the 2014 San Diego Comic-Con

"Emotional Consequences of Broadcast Television" was written by Dan Harmon, the showrunner and series creator, and Chris McKenna, an executive producer (EP) since season five. It was directed by Rob Schrab, EP for the sixth season. The opening shots of the episode featuring the characters exiting the building were originally going to be used for an episode based around a fire drill. The episode was released on the online streaming service Yahoo Screen on June 2, 2015, where Community had moved after being canceled by NBC.

"Emotional Consequences of Broadcast Television" features Joel McHale as Jeff Winger, Gillian Jacobs as Britta Perry, Danny Pudi as Abed Nadir, Ken Jeong as Ben Chang, Jim Rash as Craig Pelton, and Alison Brie as Annie Edison. Several recurring characters appear, most prominently Paget Brewster as Frankie Dart and Keith David as Elroy Patashnik. The episode features a cameo appearance by former series regular Yvette Nicole Brown as Shirley Bennett, who had left the show following the end of season five to take care of a sick family member. Brown previously made a cameo appearance during the season six premiere, "Ladders". Justin Roiland—who worked with Harmon on the animated sitcom Rick and Morty—makes a voice-only cameo as "Ice Cube Head" during Chang's pitch. Seth Green plays a billionaire who buys the campus in one pitch. Harmon does the voiceover in the episode's end tag; his performance is uncredited.

Chang makes a fart joke where he farts in relation to season four. The season had been referred to both in and out-of-universe as "the gas leak year", due to a perceived reduction in quality and inconsistent character behavior. The song "Ends of the Earth" by Lord Huron plays during the final moments of the episode as Jeff drops Abed and Annie off at the airport and drinks with the rest of the group. According to Jacobs in the DVD extra Six Seasons and a Finale, Abed's speech about television made Jeong cry. In the episode, the word fuck is used twice, spoken once by Rash and once by Jacobs. This marks the first and only time the word was used in the series. Although network restrictions on profanity did not apply as the season was produced by Yahoo, Harmon did not change the language used in the series. In an interview with TV Insider, Harmon why the profanity was included in the finale, stating it was "kind of unintentional. That one that Jim does is adlibbed. As soon as he said it, the entire cast started laughing, but I edited around it. As for Britta's I should have bleeped it... it's weird to have two 'fucks' on that one."

== Analysis ==
Most season finales of Community ended with uncertainty over the program's future, particularly season three's "Introduction to Finality". Elroy says over whether he will return: "I think so ... Probably ... Maybe." This also describes the possible return of the show and its continually changing main cast. Critics found that "Emotional Consequences of Broadcast Television" had the greatest deal of closure of a season finale.

The episode's structure mirrors "Remedial Chaos Theory" through the use of multiple timelines that explore characterization, here through each character pitching a seventh season. Many critics noted similarities between the two episodes. The framing device was also similar to the third season episodes "Horror Fiction in Seven Spooky Steps" and "Virtual Systems Analysis", wherein various characters tell stories. The episode makes a reference to "Basic Intergluteal Numismatics", which leaves ambiguous the identity of the Ass Crack Bandit, an unknown character who "cracks" people by putting a coin in their butt. In the finale, when the matter comes up in conversation, Annie is nervous and suggests that it "could've been anybody".

During the episode, Jeff experiences anxiety as Elroy, Abed and Annie announce plans for the future. In "Intro to Recycled Cinema", he expressed vulnerability to Abed about being the last person left at Greendale. Jeff's pitches for season seven reflect his insecurity, a theme of the sixth season. This contrasts with the second part of season five's finale "Basic Sandwich", in which Abed and Annie seek to avoid change while Jeff embraces it. His misguided relationship with Britta in "Basic Sandwich" parallels his vision of having a family with Annie in "Emotional Consequences of Broadcast Television". Annie is the one in the series finale to help him accept his position. Jeff hugs Abed twice, indicating how much he values their friendship, and his final words are not audible over the music.

Before the end tag, the episode cuts to a black screen reading "#andamovie", a shortening of the phrase "six seasons and a movie". The phrase was first used by Abed in "Paradigms of Human Memory", in reference to the short-lived program The Cape (2010–2011), and became a fan slogan to protest the show's cancellations and hiatuses. According to Eric Goldman of IGN, despite the closing hashtag, it did not seem like Harmon and McKenna were particularly hopeful of a continuation of the series. Following the finale, there was speculation around a seventh season, but the actors' contracts had expired. Yahoo expressed interest in immediately producing a movie, to which Harmon responded that he needed to "miss Community" before writing it. A film was commissioned by Peacock, a streaming service run by NBCUniversal, in 2022.

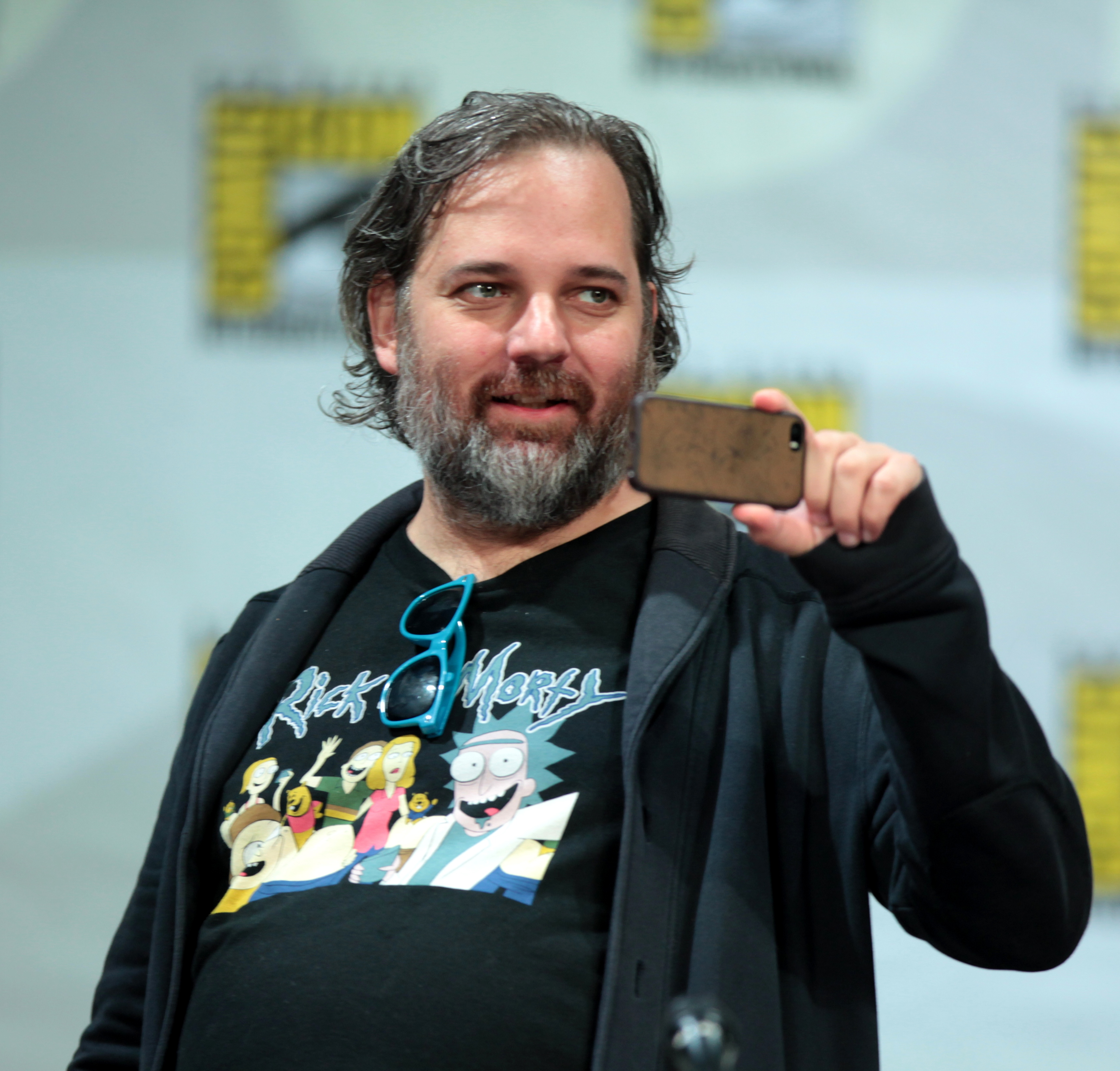
Series creator Dan Harmon at the 2014 San Diego Comic-Con

The end tag features Harmon's voice in a fourth wall breaking monologue that references the series finale of St. Elsewhere (1982–1988). The narration also includes reference to the Nielsen rating system used by television channels to measure viewership. Harmon labels the system as being "secretive" and "obsolete", and comments that "it turns out tens of millions were watching the whole time". According to Nielsen, Community season five averaged three million viewers an episode before being cancelled by NBC. On his podcast Harmontown, Harmon stated that Yahoo, whose streaming service Yahoo Screen released season six, was able to track viewership more effectively and gave him a significantly higher viewer estimate, which he described as two or three times higher than he anticipated. Similar commentary can be found in the opening moments, where the Dean notes that a long list of groups—including his father and the health inspector—did not think the college would survive the year. The groups may be an analogy for NBC and detractors of the show, and Community's future frequently being uncertain.

== Critical reception ==
"Emotional Consequences of Broadcast Television" received acclaim, with critics praising its tone, humor, and plot, and many finding it a perfect ending for the series. Writing for Variety, Alex Stedman felt that the episode was a satisfying and emotional end to the series. Joshua Alston of The A.V. Club gave the episode an "A". Eric Goldman of IGN graded the episode a 9/10, an "Amazing" score, writing "Community ended its sixth (and final?) season with a clever and emotional finale." Writing for Den of Geek, Mark Harrison found the episode, especially when paired with the previous episodes "Modern Espionage" and "Wedding Videography", to be an incredible ending for the series. Uproxx's Alan Sepinwall described the finale as "tremendously satisfying" and fitting for the series. A Paste review also found the episode to be fitting, albeit was much more critical of the episode. In 2020, a ranking by Entertainment Weekly staff of Community's top episodes placed the episode seventh, noting its "raw confessional quality" and labeling it one of the greatest series finales ever. The magazine's dedicated review of the episode found it to be an improvement on both the season four and five finales. In a 2023 ranking, Slant Magazine's Chris Barsanti ranked it as the tenth-best episode, praising Abed's comparison of relationships to television and the end tag.

The episode’s use of self-referential humor was the most widely praised element. Alston, Stedman, and Time's James Poniewozik highlighted how the episode's concept and Community's general use of meta humor provided an outlet for the imaginative meta humor, while Darren Franich of Entertainment Weekly cited the end tag as a highlight of the meta elements of both the episode and Community overall. He found the episode to be a funny deconstruction of the series. Alston noted that while "Emotional Consequences of Broadcast Television" succeeded in using the gimmick, it could easily have been mishandled. Writing for Den of Geek, Joe Mater favorably compared the plot to the plotline of the season five finale, "Basic Story" and "Basic Sandwich", which he described as "obnoxiously smug", Mater viewed "Emotional Consequences of Broadcast Television" as more self-critical and acknowledging of Community's faults. Poniewozik described the series as both its "best critic" and "best defender".

The acting and characters were also praised. Alston labeled the acting and emotion as high points, praising how the pitches worked well at showing off the characters' differences. He wrote, "with each new version, we're reminded of how these characters are different, what perspective they bring to the Save Greendale Committee, as well as how they see the group and what they get out of belonging to it." Poniewozik noted how the episode utilized "fourth wall breaks" through the individual identities of the characters. Writing for The Daily Beast, Chancellor Agard said that like the strongest episodes of the show, "the self-referential and gratuitously meta humor is strung together by an emotional thread focusing on what these wacky friendships mean to each person". Alex Welch of Screen Rant highlighted how the episode revealed the various characters' psychology, pointing to the "emotionally cathartic" moment of Jeff standing alone at the study group table. Both Alston and Poniewozik found the pitches to do an exceptional job at keeping characterization consistent, Alston found the episode did a good job at undoing the flanderization they had undergone. Despite the #andamovie card, Sepinwall noted that given cast's other commitments, a continuation was unlikely, though there was still good narrative footing for one, Goldman also expressed doubt about the possibility of a movie but felt the episode was a good send off for the characters regardless. Welch found the decision to deliberately separate the characters to give a more definitive ending preferable to one which left the door open for hypothetical future stories, an ending which many more traditional finales used.

Despite the high praise, the episode did receive some criticism. A review by the staff of Paste felt the episode was a "fitting conclusion" for the series, describing it as an "implosion of the insularity that brought its meta-levels to whole new heights". The review questioned the characterization of the cast, particularly that of Jeff, and felt that the episode relied overly on clichés. It also noted that while the episode had its moments, it was largely unfunny. Agard, writing for The Daily Beast, noted that while the episode was an overall success, it failed to reach the heights of "Remedial Chaos Theory".
