= Community season 6 =

Season of television series

Community
- Season 6
- DVD cover
- Showrunner: Dan Harmon
- Starring: Joel McHale; Gillian Jacobs; Danny Pudi; Alison Brie; Jim Rash; Ken Jeong
- No. of episodes: 13

Release
- Original network: Yahoo Screen
- Original release: March 17 – June 2, 2015

Season chronology
- ← Previous; Season 5

The sixth and final season of the television sitcom Community premiered on Yahoo Screen on March 17, 2015, with a two-episode premiere, and concluded on June 2, 2015. The season consists of 13 episodes released weekly via Yahoo Screen on Tuesdays. Yahoo! announced in June 2014 that it had picked up the series for a sixth season after NBC had canceled the series in May 2014. The season features the exit of Yvette Nicole Brown in a starring role. It also features Paget Brewster and Keith David, who previously made guest appearances in seasons 5 and 3 respectively, returning to the show in new recurring roles, Brewster playing Frankie Dart and David playing Elroy Patashnik.

== Cast ==
=== Starring ===
- Joel McHale as Professor Jeff Winger
- Gillian Jacobs as Britta Perry
- Danny Pudi as Abed Nadir
- Alison Brie as Annie Edison
- Jim Rash as Dean Craig Pelton
- Ken Jeong as Ben Chang

=== Recurring ===
- Paget Brewster as Francesca "Frankie" Dart
- Keith David as Elroy Patashnik
- Richard Erdman as Leonard Briggs
- Erik Charles Nielsen as Garrett Lambert
- Danielle Kaplowitz as Vicki Jenkins
- David Neher as Todd Jacobson
- Darsan Solomon as Dave
- Martin Mull as George Perry
- Lesley Ann Warren as Deb Perry
- Craig Cackowski as Officer Cackowski
- Leslie Simms as Rhonda
- Yvette Nicole Brown as Shirley Bennett ("Ladders" and "Emotional Consequences of Broadcast Television")

=== Guest stars ===
- Steve Agee as David ("Modern Espionage")
- Matt Berry as Roger DeSalvo ("Grifting 101")
- Matt Besser as Blake ("Basic RV Repair and Palmistry")
- Brooke Burns as TV Host ("Intro to Recycled Cinema")
- Jay Chandrasekhar as Gupta Gupti Gupta ("Basic Email Security")
- Irene Choi as Annie Kim ("Queer Studies and Advanced Waxing")
- Wayne Federman as The Dad ("Emotional Consequences of Broadcast Television")
- Nathan Fillion as Bob Waite ("Ladders")
- Seth Green as Scrunch ("Emotional Consequences of Broadcast Television")
- Steve Guttenberg as Maury ("Intro to Recycled Cinema")
- Mitchell Hurwitz as Preston Koogler ("Modern Espionage")
- David St. James as Professor Albrecht ("Ladders")
- Jeremy Scott Johnson as Carl Bladt ("Queer Studies and Advanced Waxing")
- O-Lan Jones as Garrett's Mom ("Wedding Videography")
- Charley Koontz as Neil ("Basic Email Security")
- Lisa Loeb as Julie ("Advanced Safety Features")
- Jason Mantzoukas as Matt Lundergard ("Queer Studies and Advanced Waxing")
- Kumail Nanjiani as Lapari ("Modern Espionage")
- Brady Novak as Richie Countee ("Queer Studies and Advanced Waxing")
- Randall Park as himself ("Intro to Recycled Cinema")
- Ryan Ridley as Ryan Ridley ("Grifting 101")
- Justin Roiland as the Voice of Ice Cube Head ("Emotional Consequences of Broadcast Television")
- Danielle Schneider as Karen ("Basic RV Repair and Palmistry")
- Travis Schuldt as Rick/Subway ("Advanced Safety Features")
- Dino Stamatopoulos as Alex "Star-Burns" Osbourne ("Modern Espionage")
- Brian Van Holt as Willy Sebert Smith ("Laws of Robotics and Party Rights")
- Luke Youngblood as Magnitude ("Intro to Recycled Cinema")
- Steven Weber as Detective Butcher ("Ladders")
- Billy Zane as Honda Boss ("Advanced Safety Features")
- Matt Gourley as "Briggs Hatton" ("Wedding Videography")
- Erin McGathy as Stacy ("Wedding Videography")

== Episodes ==
Season six episodes
No. overall	No. in season	Title	Directed by	Written by	Original release date	Prod. code
98	1	"Ladders"	Rob Schrab	Dan Harmon & Chris McKenna	March 17, 2015	602
Dean Pelton hires Francesca "Frankie" Dart (Paget Brewster) as a consultant to help improve Greendale, but her tactics create tension on campus with the rest of the Save Greendale committee.
99	2	"Lawnmower Maintenance and Postnatal Care"	Jim Rash & Nat Faxon	Alex Rubens	March 17, 2015	601
When the Dean becomes obsessed with an expensive virtual reality system, Jeff seeks out the inventor, Elroy Patashnik (Keith David), to get a refund. Meanwhile, Britta discovers that her parents have been helping her financially from behind the scenes.
100	3	"Basic Crisis Room Decorum"	Bobcat Goldthwait	Monica Padrick	March 24, 2015	605
When City College plans an attack ad asserting that Greendale gave a degree to a dog, the group clashes over the best way to handle the situation.
101	4	"Queer Studies and Advanced Waxing"	Jim Rash & Nat Faxon	Matt Lawton	March 31, 2015	603
The Dean is offered a position on the school board but only as a token homosexual. Meanwhile, Chang auditions for a theater version of The Karate Kid, and Abed and Elroy attempt to fix the school's Wi-Fi connection.
102	5	"Laws of Robotics and Party Rights"	Rob Schrab	Dean Young	April 7, 2015	604
Prisoners attend Greendale via telepresence robots, where one students ends up conflicting with Jeff. Meanwhile, Britta uses Abed so she can have a party, breaking Annie's rules.
103	6	"Basic Email Security"	Jay Chandrasekhar	Matt Roller	April 14, 2015	606
A hacker threatens to publish emails unless a scheduled appearance by a racist comic (Jay Chandrasekhar) is cancelled, leading the group to once again face discourse as many of their own secret emails are leaked.
104	7	"Advanced Safety Features"	Rob Schrab	Carol Kolb	April 21, 2015	607
The Dean becomes highly susceptible to a guerrilla marketing campaign by Britta's ex-boyfriend, Rick, who now works for Honda. Meanwhile, the group tries to become closer friends with Elroy. Greendale hosts an alumni dance and hires the band Natalie is Freezing to perform, and Elroy reveals he once dated the band's lead singer Julie (Lisa Loeb).
105	8	"Intro to Recycled Cinema"	Victor Nelli, Jr.	Clay Lapari	April 28, 2015	608
When a commercial starring Chang goes viral, the group tries to cash in by converting footage of a cop drama filmed by Abed into a sci-fi film featuring him, to Abed's increasing hesitation.
106	9	"Grifting 101"	Rob Schrab	Ryan Ridley	May 5, 2015	609
The group decides to take a grifting class at Greendale, and when they are grifted by the teacher (Matt Berry), try to find a way to get back at him.
107	10	"Basic RV Repair and Palmistry"	Jay Chandrasekhar	Dan Guterman	May 12, 2015	610
The group takes a road trip in Elroy's RV to deliver a giant fiberglass hand that Frankie forces Dean Pelton to sell, while Abed imagines the trip as a flashback-filled movie.
108	11	"Modern Espionage"	Rob Schrab	Mark Stegemann	May 19, 2015	611
Frankie's "Cleaner Greendale" initiative drives the school's paintball game underground as the group tries to discover the identity of a mysterious assassin.
109	12	"Wedding Videography"	Adam Davidson	Briggs Hatton	May 26, 2015	612
The group attends Garrett's wedding while Abed films it for a new documentary.
110	13	"Emotional Consequences of Broadcast Television"	Rob Schrab	Dan Harmon & Chris McKenna	June 2, 2015	613
With six years at Greendale completed, the group imagines what a hypothetical "season seven" would be like while discussing the uncertainty of life.

== Production ==
On May 9, 2014, NBC announced that it had canceled Community. For several years prior to its cancelation, fans adopted the slogan "six seasons and a movie", a line from the episode "Paradigms of Human Memory" regarding Abed's hopeful legacy of NBC's short-lived series The Cape. Sony Pictures Television, the show's primary producer, was reported to have shopped the show to other networks and online distribution outlets, including Hulu and Comedy Central. Deadline Hollywood reported the low chance of such an outcome, with a revival deal from one unnamed suitor not likely to happen and creator Dan Harmon's enthusiasm for continuing on the show uncertain. On May 28, Deadline.com reported that Hulu was in talks with Sony Pictures TV to produce a new season of Community, with Harmon having a change of heart about the revival, saying, "I'm not going to be the guy that re-cancels cancelled Community." On June 24, TVLine reported that Hulu had ended talks with Sony Pictures TV, although The Wrap stated the report was incorrect. On June 30, the day the cast's contracts were due to expire, Yahoo! announced it had ordered a 13-episode sixth season to stream on Yahoo! Screen. The main cast return along with executive producers Dan Harmon, Chris McKenna, Russ Krasnoff and Gary Foster. Harmon said, "I am very pleased that Community will be returning for its predestined sixth season on Yahoo ... I look forward to bringing our beloved NBC sitcom to a larger audience by moving it online." For season six, the series moved shooting locations from Paramount Studios to CBS Radford, which is twice the size of the previous shooting set.

In August 2014, it was announced that the Russo brothers would direct the season premiere, however, this did not come to fruition. Writing began in September 2014, and filming began in November 2014. Unlike most streaming programs, the sixth season were released weekly, as opposed to being released all at once. In September 2014, it was announced that Yvette Nicole Brown, who plays Shirley, would not return for season six due to a family emergency; however, Brown returned in guest appearances in "Ladders" and "Emotional Consequences of Broadcast Television". Paget Brewster and Keith David (Brewster previously guest-starred on the series as a different character and David provided a voice-over role) were cast as regulars for the season in November 2014; Brewster plays Francesca "Frankie" Dart, a consultant to help improve Greendale, and David plays Elroy Patashnik, a retired inventor who now searches to reinvent himself at Greendale. In November 2014, it was announced that Martin Mull and Lesley Ann Warren would guest star as Britta's parents, George and Deb Perry, in the second episode of the season. The cast and crew celebrated the making of their 100th episode on December 8, 2014.

In February 2015, Dan Harmon announced that Steve Guttenberg would guest star in an episode. In February 2015, it was confirmed that Billy Zane would play "a mysterious, nameless man scouting Britta for a unique talent" and that Travis Schuldt would return as Subway/Rick. In March 2015, the trailer for season 6 was released, and parodies the Avengers: Age of Ultron trailer in its logo, theme and coloring.

On March 15, 2015, it was announced that the series began filming a new "paintball" episode, "Modern Espionage", following the season one episode "Modern Warfare" and season two episodes "A Fistful of Paintballs" and "For a Few Paintballs More". Filming for season six ended on March 27, 2015.

On July 30, 2015, Joel McHale stated that Yahoo! "wanted to [make more seasons of Community], but all of [the actor's] contracts were up after six years." McHale later clarified his statement via Twitter, saying "Community is not canceled." Yahoo released a statement: "We've seen tremendous value in our partnership with Sony and are continuing to discuss future opportunities for Community." Harmon said he "could have said yes immediately" to season seven, but "given the actors' velocity and trajectory" decided in favor of "getting [the cast] back together for an awesome movie." On October 21, 2015, Yahoo CFO Ken Goldman announced during a Q3 earnings phone call that their original programming lineup last spring resulted in a $42 million dollar writeoff, including Sin City Saints and Other Space. On January 4, 2016, Yahoo announced it had shut down its Yahoo Screen service, with season 6 episodes being moved to Yahoo TV for continued public viewing.

== Availability ==
Episodes were available to stream via Yahoo! Screen and Hulu in the U.S., Taiwan, Hong Kong, Singapore, Malaysia, and Indonesia.

In the United Kingdom, the show aired on Sony Entertainment Television starting March 18, 2015. In Australia, the sixth season was available on Stan beginning March 17, 2015.

On September 9, 2015, Yahoo! Screen released an extra version of season six with commentary by series creator Dan Harmon.

The sixth season was released on DVD in region 1 on March 8, 2016. Special features included deleted scenes, a behind-the-scenes featurette on the making of the finale, trivia with the cast and crew, and a gag reel.

On April 1, 2020, all six seasons were made available on Netflix in the United Kingdom, Canada and the United States. In February 2024, it was announced that all six seasons would be removed from Netflix at the end of March 2024. All six seasons remain on Hulu and will be available on Peacock April 1, 2024.

== Reception ==
=== Critical response ===
The sixth season has received positive reviews from critics. On Metacritic, it has a score of 78 out of 100 based on 12 reviews, indicating "generally favorable" reviews. On Rotten Tomatoes, season 6 holds an 89% approval rating from 37 critics with an average rating of 8 out of 10. The consensus reads, "Despite cast and broadcast changes, Community manages to remain at the top of its quirky class."

=== Ratings ===
On April 1, 2015, three weeks into the sixth season's run, Harmon detailed the series viewership on Yahoo! Screen. Exclaiming "Everybody in the world watches Community, now we know, now that we're not being measured by Nielsen [ . . . ] Surprise surprise you know, Yahoo knows how to count the clicks, and guess what? Holy shit! Jesus christ! Like you always knew!" Harmon stated he couldn't give specific numbers, saying "They have data, I'm not really asking, and they're not telling, but you know lips were loose at the drunken wrap party, enough for me to go 'holy shit. That's what I always would've guessed, times two or three'. I always knew there was like way more people watching this shit than what ever that .9 represented."

== See also ==
- List of original programs distributed by Yahoo!
