= Basic RV Repair and Palmistry =

- Community episode
- Episode no.: Season 6 Episode 10
- Directed by: Jay Chandrasekhar
- Written by: Dan Guterman
- Production code: 610
- Original air date: May 12, 2015
- Running time: 26 minutes

Guest appearances
- Paget Brewster as Francesca "Frankie" Dart; Keith David as Elroy Patashnik; Matt Besser as Blake; Danielle Schneider as Karen

Episode chronology
← Previous "Grifting 101"	Next → "Modern Espionage"
- Community season 6

"Basic RV Repair and Palmistry" is the tenth episode of the sixth season of the American comedy television series Community and the 107th episode overall. It was written by Dan Guterman and directed by Jay Chandrasekhar. The episode was released on Yahoo Screen in the United States on May 12, 2015.

In the episode, the group becomes stuck along a highway when trying to deliver a giant hand to a buyer. As the rest of the group becomes frustrated with Dean Pelton for buying the hand in the first place, Abed tries to use flashbacks to change how their story is being told. It received mixed reviews from critics.

== Plot ==
The Save Greendale Committee members are traveling in Elroy's (Keith David) RV to deliver a large fiberglass hand purchased by Dean Pelton (Jim Rash) to its new owners. Due to the extra weight, Elroy miscalculates the vehicle's mileage and runs out of fuel. No tow trucks are available because of a local parade, and the group quickly begins arguing due to their predicament. Abed (Danny Pudi) tries to insert meta-commentary and to flashback to "three weeks earlier" in order to provide exposition for their situation, though these efforts irritate Jeff (Joel McHale).

Elroy discovers that both batteries are dead because everyone decided to charge their phones, leaving them trapped for the night. Despite their initial anger, the group members, except for Pelton, eventually apologize to each other. Abed tries to use flashbacks to warn the group about the issues of not starting the story three weeks earlier, to no avail. Pelton becomes upset over the group forcing him to sell his hand and leaves the RV. Abed joins Pelton with the giant hand on the RV's roof. As they sit there, the straps suddenly slip. Pelton panics, but Abed uses a flashback to imagine himself convincing the group to use thicker straps. This does not change the current situation, though, and the hand falls off the RV.

The rest of the group runs outside to see what happened, allowing Pelton to run into the RV and lock them out. Jeff encourages Abed to convince Pelton to let them back in, but Abed instead gets lost in more flashbacks. Frankie (Paget Brewster) then convinces Abed their current situation is itself a flashback, allowing Abed to imagine himself in the future and realize what he should do. Abed gives a speech about the meaning of a hand — to both hold on and let go — and Pelton is moved by the speech to let the others back in. The group decides to keep the hand for the school.

In the end tag, the buyer of the giant hand (Matt Besser) realizes he will not be receiving it. His wife (Danielle Schneider) argues his obsession with buying large items is why their son disappeared, and she indicates she will divorce him.

== Production ==
The episode was written by Dan Guterman and directed by Jay Chandrasekhar. It is a bottle episode that takes place almost entirely inside and around Elroy's RV.

== Critical reception ==
"Basic RV Repair and Palmistry" received mixed reviews from critics. Matt Fowler of IGN gave the episode a 7.5, denoting a "good" episode. He noted that a few "glorious out-there moments" saved the episode, which he felt was stretched out and had too many gimmicks and arguments. Joshua Alston of The A.V. Club gave it a B− grade, describing it as "light on laughs and a bit listless" and criticizing the show's narrowing focus on Jeff and Abed's sensibilities, though he praised the cast, particularly Brewster and David. Joe Matar of Den of Geek noted that the episode seem to present a unique concept only to end up as "something of a retread"; he gave it 3 out of 5 stars. Alan Sepinwall, writing for HitFix, remarked that there was very little story in the episode but praised the end tag.
