= Basic Email Security =

- Community episode
- Episode no.: Season 6 Episode 6
- Directed by: Jay Chandrasekhar
- Written by: Matt Roller
- Production code: 606
- Original air date: April 14, 2015
- Running time: 28 minutes

Guest appearances
- Paget Brewster as Francesca "Frankie" Dart; Keith David as Elroy Patashnik; Craig Cackowski as Officer Cackowski; Jay Chandrasekhar as Gupta Gupti Gupta; Charley Koontz as Neil; Erik Charles Nielsen as Garrett; Richard Erdman as Leonard; Leslie Simms as Rhonda

Episode chronology
← Previous "Laws of Robotics and Party Rights"	Next → "Advanced Safety Features"
- Community season 6

"Basic Email Security" is the sixth episode of the sixth season of the American comedy television series Community and the 103rd episode overall. It was directed by Jay Chandrasekhar, who also makes a guest appearance in the episode, and was written by Matt Roller. The episode was released on Yahoo Screen in the United States on April 14, 2015.

In the episode, which was inspired by the 2014 Sony Pictures hack, the Save Greendale Committee must respond to a hacker's threat to leak emails in response to an upcoming performance by an offensive comedian. It received mixed to positive reviews from critics.

== Plot ==
The Save Greendale Committee learns that the lunch lady's emails have been leaked in response to the upcoming performance by comedian Gupta Gupti Gupta (Jay Chandrasekhar), known for his bigoted routine. The hacker warns that the committee's emails will also be leaked if the performance is not cancelled. Despite the others' hesitation, Britta (Gillian Jacobs) encourages the others to respect freedom of speech and allow the performance to proceed. They also agree not to read each other's emails once they are eventually leaked.

Later, the committee arrives to set up for the performance in the cafeteria. They initially act awkward but eventually confess to reading the leaked emails about each other. They begin fighting over personal details within the emails until Gupta arrives and thanks them for allowing him to perform. This calms the group down, and they open the doors to find almost nobody arrived for the show. Dean Pelton (Jim Rash) receives another message warning that if the show proceeds, every student's emails will be leaked. The students form a mob and try to stop the show, but the committee holds them off long enough for Gupta to deliver a few offensive and crashingly unfunny jokes, at which point the emails are leaked.

The next day, the school is reeling from the leak. The committee struggles to figure out how to return to normal and what the lesson of their predicament is. Officer Cackowski (Craig Cackowski) arrives to reveal that the hacker is a preteen boy who guessed the school's master password (it was "change me"). As the boy is led away, Jeff (Joel McHale) says the lesson is "crime doesn't pay", which the others enthusiastically accept. In the tag scene, Officer Cackowski works with another youngster who is a cyber-detective, but they don't bond on the job.

== Production ==
The episode was written by Matt Roller and directed by Jay Chandrasekhar. Its plot is inspired by the release of the 2014 film The Interview and the subsequent hack of Sony Pictures, which produced both The Interview and Community. It is also the third episode to focus on the fallout from various group secrets being revealed, following season two's "Cooperative Calligraphy" and season five's "Cooperative Polygraphy".

== Critical reception ==
The episode received mixed to positive reviews. Joshua Alston of The A.V. Club gave the episode a B−, calling it "yet another season six Community episode that feels not quite right." Alan Sepinwall of HitFix noted that the reused format led to some diminishing returns, though he also remarked that the addition of Frankie (Paget Brewster) and Elroy (Keith David) provided some new opportunities to explore. Eric Goldman of IGN gave it 8.5 out of 10, denoting a "great" episode, and praised much of the episode's humor. Joe Matar of Den of Geek gave the episode 4.5 out of 5 stars, applauding the darker tone and singling out the second act for the most praise. Evan Valentine of Collider called it the "strongest episode in Season 6 so far" and commended it for being both funny and interesting, ultimately giving it 5 out of 5 stars.
