= Lawnmower Maintenance and Postnatal Care =

- Community episode
- Episode no.: Season 6 Episode 2
- Directed by: Jim Rash; Nat Faxon
- Written by: Alex Rubens
- Production code: 601
- Original air date: March 17, 2015
- Running time: 27 minutes

Guest appearances
- Paget Brewster as Francesca "Frankie" Dart; Keith David as Elroy Patashnik; Martin Mull as George Perry; Lesley Ann Warren as Deb Perry; Leslie Simms as Rhonda

Episode chronology
← Previous "Ladders"	Next → "Basic Crisis Room Decorum"
- Community season 6

"Lawnmower Maintenance and Postnatal Care" is the 2nd episode of the sixth season of the American comedy television series Community, and the 99th episode of the series overall. It was released on Yahoo Screen in the United States on March 17, 2015, along with the previous episode, "Ladders". The episode introduces Elroy Patashnik (Keith David) as a main character, when the Dean purchases an outdated virtual reality system for the school, whilst Britta's (Gillian Jacobs) parents are introduced as secret benefactors who have been paying money to her friends so they can loan her money.

== Plot ==
Britta is moving into Abed (Danny Pudi) and Annie's (Alison Brie) apartment, so she introduces them to her cat in the study room. The cat injures Abed and crawls under a couch; Chang (Ken Jeong) tries to retrieve it but the cat severely injures his hand. The dean (Jim Rash) announces that he has bought a virtual reality (VR) system for the school, and Jeff (Joel McHale) and Frankie (Paget Brewster) join him as he sets it up. The dean is shocked and overwhelmed by the system, despite its aged graphics.

After Britta discovers that a new sofa in Abed and Annie's apartment was delivered to the name "Perry", she works out that her parents secretly ordered it. Abed, Annie, and Jeff have been taking money from her parents for years in order to buy things for her or lend her money. They find her parents lovely and do not understand her animosity towards them. Britta approaches her parents, trying to give them a cheque for all the money they have covertly given her, which is postdated by a year so that she can leave all her friends behind and earn the money she owes by then. It is revealed that Britta's parents were hippies and helicopter parents, hence her dislike of them, and that they are attempting to make amends while avoiding direct contact with her. She storms out when she finds Annie and Abed are over to visit and steals a child's tricycle to ride away after her car does not start. Frankie finds Britta in the backseat of her car, and they discuss their parents. Frankie and Britta visit Britta's parents, and she apologizes to them. Chang arrives with a massively swollen hand, having been unable to find the nurse.

Meanwhile, Frankie tries to get the dean to find the serial number of the VR system from within its interface, which involves retrieving a file from an inordinately-sized filing cabinet. However, he realizes that she is trying to return the system for a refund and destroys the file by plunging it into a fountain. Jeff is sent to the company's headquarters, a recreational vehicle (RV) in which he argues with the system's creator Elroy Patashnik (Keith David) over its uselessness.

That night, Elroy arrives at the dean's office and tells him that the system is a waste of time. The dean refuses to leave the VR world and does not want to give it back. Elroy enters the system and overpowers the dean, giving the school a refund. The dean and Jeff thank Elroy, who now feels purposeless after admitting the futility of his products, and the dean gives him $500 for his use of the technology before reminding him that he could enroll at Greendale.

The end tag is a trailer for "Knee-High Mischief," a fictional Portuguese ripoff of the 1984 comedy-horror film Gremlins that Abed and Annie have purchased.

== Release ==
The episode premiered on March 17, 2015, along with the season premiere "Ladders". In May 2015, a clip in which the Gremlins end tag actors discuss the making of the tag was released by The A.V. Club.

== Analysis ==
The episode introduces Elroy Patashnik as a main character; the other new main character of the season, Frankie Dart, was introduced in the premiere. The virtual reality storyline parodies the 1992 science-fiction movie The Lawnmower Man. Emily VanDerWerff of Vox found that the episode was about "how impossible it is to actually grow up" and highlighted a quote of Britta's as representative of the episode's theme and the show more generally: "It doesn't matter how mature we are or what resentments we carry. All that matters is that we're all going to die!" The show ends with a spoof of Gremlins. Joshua Alston commented that season six end tags became lengthier and more independent, perhaps as Yahoo! Screen allowed varying episode lengths in comparison to a broadcast channel.

== Reception ==
Eric Goldman of IGN rated the episode 8 out of 10, but found it less strong than the season premiere. Goldman praised the story revelations involving Britta's parents and found the Dean's plot amusing, though criticized Chang's re-occurrence with a swollen hand throughout the episode. Joshua Alston of The A.V. Club gave the episode a B− rating, similarly criticizing the usage of Chang and praising Britta's storyline. However, Alston found the virtual reality storyline too lengthy. Collider's Evan Valentine also found the episode weaker than the previous, believing each storyline to be mixed in terms of humor, but lauded the end tag. David Sims of The Atlantic praised David's acting and found the parody of The Lawnmower Man "strangely apt" for Yahoo! Screen, saying that the episode gave "renewed emphasis on the cinematic inventiveness and strangely sentimental core" of the show's earlier style.
