= Queer Studies and Advanced Waxing =

- Community episode
- Episode no.: Season 6 Episode 4
- Directed by: Jim Rash and Nat Faxon
- Written by: Matt Lawton
- Production code: 603
- Original air date: March 31, 2015
- Running time: 31 minutes

Guest appearances
- Paget Brewster as Francesca "Frankie" Dart; Keith David as Elroy Patashnik; Brady Novak as Richie; Jeremy Scott Johnson as Carl; Jason Mantzoukas as Matt Lundergard

Episode chronology
← Previous "Basic Crisis Room Decorum"	Next → "Laws of Robotics and Party Rights"
- Community season 6

"Queer Studies and Advanced Waxing" is the 4th episode of the sixth season and 101st overall episode of the American comedy television series Community. The episode was written by Matt Lawton and directed by Jim Rash and Nat Faxon. It premiered on Yahoo Screen on March 31, 2015.

== Plot ==
Annie (Alison Brie) helps Chang (Ken Jeong) practice for an audition for a stage adaptation of the 1984 movie The Karate Kid, but Chang is highly nervous. Frankie (Paget Brewster) and the dean (Jim Rash) arrive, and the group loudly insist that they immediately fix the school's WiFi, which has gone down. The IT lady is missing, so the dean hires Elroy (Keith David) as a replacement.

Richie (Brady Novak) and Carl (Jeremy Scott Johnson), members of the school board, offer the dean a place on the school board if he agrees to identify as gay, as they are looking to avoid controversy after cancelling a pride parade. The dean is reluctant, viewing "gay" as an insufficient label for his identity. Frankie tells him that his sexuality is none of anyone else's business, but Jeff (Joel McHale) believes that the dean could achieve good things in the school board role. The Dean agrees to the role and announces, with a fake partner Domingo, that he is to join the board.

Abed (Danny Pudi) begs Elroy not to disrupt the bird's nest he discovers as the cause of the WiFi issue and gets Elroy to change his mind. The dean is initially sympathetic, but after being criticized in his role as board member he returns with security guards and forces Abed and Elroy to remove the nest. They begin caring for the baby birds themselves.

At the Karate Kid audition, Chang is cast as Miyagi, though he auditioned for the kid's role, and Annie—who auditioned at the director Matt Lundergard's (Jason Mantzoukas) insistence—is cast as the kid. In rehearsals, Lundergard is verbally abusive toward Chang while showing kindness toward Annie. After discussing it with Britta (Gillian Jacobs), Annie decides that she will threaten to quit unless Lundergard treats Chang better. She does so and Lundergard fires her, saying that Miyagi is the main character and her role is unimportant.

A regretful Dean announces to the press that he is "coming out" as a politician and is fired. Two of the three birds Abed is watching over die. Annie tries to get the group to boycott the Karate Kid play, but they all watch and are moved by Chang's excellent performance. In the end tag, Abed gathers the group to release the third bird, who moves into the control box of a transformer station.

== Critical reception ==
Eric Goldman of IGN rated the episode nine out of ten, finding it the strongest so far of the sixth season. Sean Gandert of Paste gave it eight out of ten. Joshua Alston of The A.V. Club gave the episode an A− rating. Joe Matar of Den of Geek rated the episode 3.5 out of five. Entertainment Weekly's Keith Staskiewicz found that the episode has a theme of identity, with Chang's casting showing that "stereotypical roles can be redeemed by actors" and Dean's storyline demonstrating that "putting characters into boxes" is "harmful to real diversity". Alan Sepinwall, writing for Uproxx, found the episode too long despite the fact that it featured "the best Chang subplot the show has done in a long time". Sepinwall criticised the conclusion to the Dean's storyline.
