= Advanced Safety Features =

- Community episode
- Episode no.: Season 6 Episode 7
- Directed by: Rob Schrab
- Written by: Carol Kolb
- Production code: 607
- Original air date: April 21, 2015
- Running time: 28 minutes

Guest appearances
- Paget Brewster as Francesca "Frankie" Dart; Keith David as Elroy Patashnik; Travis Schuldt as Rick; Richard Erdman as Leonard Briggs; David Neher as Todd; Danielle Kaplowitz as Vicki; Lesley Ann Warren as Deb Perry; Martin Mull as George Perry; Billy Zane as Honda Boss; Lisa Loeb as Julie

Episode chronology
| ← Previous "Basic Email Security" | Next → "Intro to Recycled Cinema" |
- Community season 6

"Advanced Safety Features" is the seventh episode of the sixth season of the American comedy television series Community, and the 104th episode of the series overall. It was released on Yahoo Screen in the United States on April 21, 2015. The episode also features product placement by Honda throughout the episode.

== Plot ==
In the study room, the Save Greendale Committee is going over plans for the upcoming alumni dance. Frankie (Paget Brewster) then lectures them on guerrilla marketing, a sales technique which is now a problem at Greendale, evidenced by Dean Pelton (Jim Rash) announcing his need to buy a Honda. Once the meeting ends, Elroy (Keith David) quickly leaves, and Chang (Ken Jeong) suggests it is because he has not found his role in the group yet. After everyone comments on how much they miss Troy, leading Frankie to ask why he was so special, Jeff (Joel McHale) tells her he played the steel drums.

Annie (Alison Brie) warns Britta (Gillian Jacobs) that her ex-boyfriend Subway (Travis Schuldt) (Note: As seen in "Digital Exploration of Interior Design".) is in the school's parking lot, in which she discovers he is still a corporate tool, except now working for Honda. He reintroduces himself to her as "Rick", and although he claims to be there for her, she realizes his main purpose is to sell his company's brand. Britta watches Rick convince Dean Pelton to upgrade a new Honda he bought for a more expensive vehicle. Despite her disgust, she ends up joining Rick in the backseat of his car. Their afterglow is then interrupted by the Dean, and while Rick is distracted by the "level seven susceptible", Britta exits the car and storms off.

Annie and Abed (Danny Pudi) tell Jeff about their plan to befriend Elroy playing a 90s board game called "The Ears Have It", which Jeff is dismissive of. He later finds the three and Chang playing a spirited game and enjoying each other's company. Elroy leaves upon his arrival, leading them to speculate that he does not like Jeff.

At "The Vatican", Britta is tending bar when a customer (Billy Zane) shows up, who she convinces to buy a scotch. Rick appears and reveals the customer is his Honda boss and proposes that Britta becomes his marketing partner. Although this will allow them to be a couple in public, Britta is reluctant to force people to buy unnecessary things. When the boss points out she already does this in her bar tending job, Britta accepts their offer and seals the deal by kissing Rick.

The next day, the new couple immediately get to work in convincing Todd (David Neher) to consider buying a Honda. Jeff tries to join Annie, Abed, Chang, and Elroy in the cafeteria, where Elroy once again immediately leaves. Before he goes, Abed gives Elroy an exclusive CD of his favorite band "Natalie Is Freezing". Elsewhere, Frankie discovers Dean Pelton in his office surrounded by an overwhelming amount of Honda products. She scolds him for his gullibility until he breaks down crying and she tries to comfort him. That night, Britta brings Rick over to her parents' house for dinner. Things go well until Rick starts to covertly sell George (Martin Mull) and Deb (Lesley Ann Warren) on Honda vehicles.

Back at school, the committee is finishing the alumni dance decorations when Jeff announces he booked the band "Natalie is Freezing" for the event, which infuriates Elroy. He calls Jeff out on his obvious attempts to win his favor and leaves just as the band arrives. Meanwhile, Britta and Rick argue as they drive home, upset he is always on the job, and he is frustrated she cannot understand that is who he is. Britta leaves the car and returns to the "Vatican" for another shift, when Elroy shows up for a drink. He reveals that despite "Natalie is Freezing" being his favorite band, he dated the lead singer Julie (Lisa Loeb), which ended so poorly he has not let anyone close to him since. Britta sympathizes but advises him against shutting everyone out.

Rick then appears and declares that he will quit his job for Britta. They go to the dance where Rick overhears Frankie mentioning the Dean wanting to buy a fleet of vehicles. Over Britta's protests, Rick leaves to do one last big score. In the student lounge, Elroy gets some closure when he tells Julie how much she hurt him, and also manages to make up with Jeff when he comes clean about wanting to be friends. Britta then finds out Rick was set up by Pelton and Frankie. As security escort Rick off campus, the Honda boss tries and fails to comfort Britta. Afterwards, the committee attends the concert and sees Frankie on stage playing the steel drums. Elroy and Jeff later share a drink at the bar as Britta sadly cleans some glasses. Somewhere far away, Rick is driving his Honda as tears fall from his eyes.

In the end tag, Britta attempts to play "The Ears Have It" with her parents.

== Production ==
In February 2015, it was reported that Travis Schuldt would return to the series as Subway/Rick, and that Billy Zane would also make a guest appearance as a character who wanted to recruit Britta for her unique abilities. During the episode various scenes were shot outdoors on the CBS Studio City backlot.

== Critical reception ==
Alan Sepinwall of HitFix points to the moment in this episode when "Frankie tried to console the Dean even as she was calling him stupid," as "a nice moment" for Paget Brewster's character. Joshua Alston from The A.V. Club found that the episode "captures Community's themes so perfectly, it's comforting even when it isn't bringing the laughs," and found, "Frankie turning the Dean into her lapdog to help take down Rick for his shady salesmanship," one of the funniest parts of the story. He also says that "there are limits to how deftly a show can overtly integrate advertising," but that the overt product integration is ridiculously funny. Eric Goldman of IGN mentions, "Chang’s PowerPoint presentation got funnier and funnier as it went on," and points to Jeff's realization that someone doesn't like him, as another facet of the episode's story-line that made this episode especially good. In Yahoo's Robert Chan weekly Postmortem with Community's Dan Harmon, Chan says, "nobody's cooler than Keith David." For the first time, the character of Elroy becomes integral to the episode's story-line. At the same time Harmon cautions the relevance of other established series regulars, like Alison Brie's character, Annie, which in this episode seems to have faded into the background.
