= Basic Crisis Room Decorum =

- Community episode
- Episode no.: Season 6 Episode 3
- Directed by: Bobcat Goldthwait
- Written by: Monica Padrick
- Production code: 605
- Original air date: March 24, 2015
- Running time: 24 minutes

Guest appearances
- Paget Brewster as Francesca "Frankie" Dart; Keith David as Elroy Patashnik; Takuma Anzai as Takashi

Episode chronology
| ← Previous "Lawnmower Maintenance and Postnatal Care" | Next → "Queer Studies and Advanced Waxing" |
- Community season 6

"Basic Crisis Room Decorum" is the 3rd episode of the sixth season of the American comedy television series Community, and the 100th episode overall. The episode was written by Monica Padrick and directed by Bobcat Goldthwait. It premiered on Yahoo Screen on March 24, 2015.

== Plot ==
In the middle of the night, Annie receives a text message from a friend who warns her that the rival City College are planning to run an attack ad on Greendale in the morning. She gathers the Save Greendale Committee for an emergency meeting, though confusion arises from the Dean's attempts at communication; rather than Jeff's real number, he has the number of Takashi (Takuma Anzai), a Japanese teenager who is pretending to be Jeff as a prank.

The committee meet in the study room, with Chang also appearing. Britta is drunk from her bartending job and, after accidentally soiling herself, runs away. Jeff is unconvinced that the meeting is worth his time as Elroy arrives with Britta in tow, who is wearing a spare pair of his trousers. Abed has obtained a copy of the attack ad from City College's AV Club—it claims that Greendale once gave a degree to a dog, Ruffles. After the Dean refuses to deny the claim, Jeff plans to discredit the dog while Frankie and Annie investigate the veracity of the assertion. Meanwhile, Chang plans to film pornography at City College to ruin its credibility. The Dean texts Takashi, who asks him to bring Jeff five cans of olives.

In Elroy's R.V., Britta and Elroy bond over a shared music interest, with Britta bursting into a very poor rendition of a Natalie is Freezing song. Annie is devastated when she and Frankie discover that Ruffles did have a lengthy transcript from the school, but Frankie is pleased to find that Ruffles failed to graduate because of an unpaid $15 library fine. The Dean brings Jeff the olives, leaving him mystified and annoyed.

Jeff and Abed show off a counter-attack ad aimed at discrediting Ruffles. Frankie and Annie's findings are enough to call the TV station and have the ad withdrawn, but Annie objects, saying that it would be unfair to pull it on a technicality since Greendale is the sort of school where a dog could get a degree. Jeff is insistent on having the ad withdrawn, but Annie threatens to transfer to a different college and storms out.

Abed shows Annie the revised Greendale ad that was actually aired, in which the Dean admits that Greendale needs to improve, as a dog could get a degree at the school. Annie returns to the committee, pleased at their decision. Chang arrives and shows off his porn film, in which he was confusedly wearing a Greendale T-shirt and standing in front of a wall that is not clearly at City College.

In the end tag, Takashi tries to come clean to the Dean after his father scolds him for extortionate phone fees, but the Dean remains wilfully oblivious. Takashi later grows up to become a yakuza (crime syndicate) leader.

== Critical reception ==
Joshua Alston of The A.V. Club gave the episode a B+ rating. Eric Goldman of IGN rated the episode 7.3 out of 10. Evan Valentine of Collider rated the episode four out of five stars. Finding the episode close to a bottle episode in style, Entertainment Weekly's Keith Staskiewicz praised it as "the quickest, strongest, and funniest" of the first three episodes of the season. Emily VanDerWerff of Vox praised the storyline of the Dean communicating with the boys pretending to be Jeff, finding it a "hilarious gag" and reviewing that it would be cut from most network television episodes, as the main plot does not depend on it, but that on streaming television the runtime can be expanded to include the storyline.

== See also ==
- List of animals awarded human credentials
