= Wedding Videography =

- Community episode
- Episode no.: Season 6 Episode 12
- Directed by: Adam Davidson
- Written by: Briggs Hatton
- Production code: 612
- Original air date: May 26, 2015
- Running time: 26 minutes

Guest appearances
- Paget Brewster as Francesca "Frankie" Dart; Keith David as Elroy Patashnik; Erik Charles Nielsen as Garrett Lambert; O-Lan Jones as Garrett's mom; David Neher as Todd; Erin McGathy as Stacy; Matt Gourley as Briggs Hatton

Episode chronology
← Previous "Modern Espionage"	Next → "Emotional Consequences of Broadcast Television"
- Community season 6

"Wedding Videography" is the twelfth and penultimate episode of the sixth season of the American comedy television series Community and the 109th episode overall. It was written by Briggs Hatton and directed by Adam Davidson. The episode was released on Yahoo Screen in the United States on May 26, 2015.

In the episode, Abed films a documentary as the group attends a wedding for two of their classmates. Their self-centered actions draw negative attention from the other guests, and when Jeff volunteers to give a toast to make up for their indiscretions, he accidentally discovers the newlyweds are related to each other. The episode received mixed reviews from critics.

== Plot ==
Abed (Danny Pudi) films Garrett's (Erik Charles Nielsen) proposal to Stacy (Erin McGathy) in Jeff's (Joel McHale) law class. Abed continues filming events on the day of the wedding, starting with Britta (Gillian Jacobs) and Annie (Alison Brie) getting ready at their apartment. The other "Save Greendale Committee" members arrive to head over to the wedding, but Britta and Annie reveal they lied to them about the time to ensure they arrived early. With the extra time, the group parties and plays games until they realize they are behind schedule again and have to leave.

The group arrives at the wedding during the vows, and their loud and obnoxious entry draws notice. During the reception, Garrett's mother (O-Lan Jones) reprimands them for their behavior; the group agrees to be better guests and disperses to meet the other guests. After Garrett's brother (also played by Nielsen) relapses and is unable to provide the best man toast, Jeff volunteers to give it instead. He discusses the connections the group has found between Garrett's and Stacy's families, including the fact that Garrett's great-aunt Polly and Stacy's "meemaw" are from the same town. However, when he invites Polly and Meemaw to the front, everyone realizes they are the same person, making Garrett and Stacy's marriage incestuous.

As the newlyweds discuss what to do, the committee members begin arguing and blaming themselves for the situation. Garrett announces that while marrying one's cousin is legal in Colorado, they have decided to annul the marriage. Chang (Ken Jeong) steps in despite the group's objections and gets Garrett and Stacy to admit they still love each other. He encourages them to stay married despite the challenges they will face, which they agree to do. The festivities resume, and the committee shares a group hug on the dance floor.

In the end tag, Briggs Hatton (Matt Gourley) explains to the audience that he has been researching incest and finds state laws on the topic inconsistent and outdated. He reveals that the show's writers allowed him to address the topic only if he identified himself as the writer at the end of the episode.

== Production ==
"Wedding Videography" was written by Briggs Hatton and directed by Adam Davidson. It is Hatton's first and only writing credit for the show, as well as Davidson's eighth and final directing credit. The episode is shot in a mockumentary format and is portrayed as one of Abed's documentary projects. The show had previously used the mockumentary format in "Intermediate Documentary Filmmaking", "Documentary Filmmaking: Redux", and "Advanced Documentary Filmmaking".

Stacy is played by Erin McGathy, who had recently married series creator Dan Harmon in real life. Harmon explained that the episode drew lightly on his fears about what he thought marrying him would be like. Matt Gourley plays Hatton in the final scene, and another actor stands in for Harmon in the same scene. Harmon later explained that he did not appear as himself because Hatton and the other writers in the scene were all portrayed by actors and he did not want to stand out.

== Critical reception ==
The episode received mixed reviews from critics. Eric Goldman of IGN gave it 8.5 out of 10, denoting a "great" episode, and remarked that the show demonstrated again how self-centered the main characters can be. He singled out Chang's role, Elroy's (Keith David) addiction to "encouraging white people", and the end tag for praise. Alan Sepinwall of Uproxx praised the episode, along with "Modern Espionage" from the previous week, for being the best of the season and providing a return to form for the show. He noted that while the show had provided better commentary on the mockumentary format in the past, the episode still provided a solid outsider's perspective on the group's dynamics.

Joe Matar of Den of Geek was much more critical of the episode, giving it 1.5 out of 5 stars and calling it one of the worst episodes produced by Harmon. He criticized the premise for being sloppy and for rehashing an earlier gimmick (the mockumentary format) without adding anything new, and he remarked that the episode was oddly structureless. Joshua Alston of The A.V. Club gave it a B−, noting that while it was frequently funny, it worked better as "a collection of clips" rather than a full episode. He added that the characters' relationships were becoming less clearly defined, which he felt threatened the show's ability to feel real or be introspective like its earlier seasons were.

In a retrospective ranking of the show's 110 episodes, Cory Barker of TV.com placed the episode thirty-first, noting that it "found that nice middle ground between uncomfortably funny and heartwarming".
