= Laws of Robotics and Party Rights =

- Community episode
- Episode no.: Season 6 Episode 5
- Directed by: Rob Schrab
- Written by: Dean Young
- Production code: 604
- Original air date: April 7, 2015
- Running time: 28 minutes

Guest appearances
- Paget Brewster as Francesca "Frankie" Dart; Keith David as Elroy Patashnik; Brian Van Holt as Willy

Episode chronology
← Previous "Queer Studies and Advanced Waxing"	Next → "Basic Email Security"
- Community season 6

"Laws of Robotics and Party Rights" is the fifth episode of the sixth season of the American comedy television series Community. The episode was written by Dean Young and directed by Rob Schrab. It premiered on Yahoo Screen on April 7, 2015.

== Plot ==
Britta (Gillian Jacobs), who has recently moved into Annie (Alison Brie) and Abed's (Danny Pudi) apartment, asks them if she can throw a party. Annie tells her that she can only have eight guests. The conversation is interrupted by Frankie (Paget Brewster) appearing on a telepresence robot—a tablet device mounted on a long stick with a base that can move and rotate. A government agency has offered Greendale $300,000 for a program where prison inmates join classes via these robots. The dean (Jim Rash) initially objects, but Jeff (Joel McHale) convinces him that it is a good idea after they hear about the monetary incentive.

Willy (Brian Van Holt), a convicted murderer, joins Jeff's law class, in which Jeff decides to slack off by playing Planet Earth. Later, as Jeff is leaving the school, Willy approaches him and tries to push him down the stairs, but his robot has too little force to move Jeff. When Jeff tries to complain to the dean the next morning, he finds Willy complaining to the dean that Jeff played a documentary in class rather than teaching. The dean proceeds to chastise Jeff in the hopes of keeping the $300,000, as well as to try and move on from Jeff. At Jeff's next class, Willy discusses his prison experience with the students. Jeff tries to teach but is questioned by Willy and becomes increasingly angry, causing Garrett to joke to the class about Jeff's sudden seriousness.

Meanwhile, Britta tries to convince Abed to overrule Annie about her party. She and Abed agree to make a movie about a house party, set in their apartment. Annie warns Britta that this will not end well. At the party, in which the dean sneaks in many of the prison inmates via tablet devices, Abed tries to shoot a movie about it. Britta awakens the next morning to find Abed still insistently filming one attendee and then bringing in a group of actors in order to fully capture a group "partying like there's no tomorrow". Britta becomes frustrated with this after being unable to sleep, so Annie has her admit to Abed that her ulterior motive was to have a party. Abed is offended, but Annie assures Britta she will be forgiven.

When Willy approaches Jeff again, Jeff throws the tablet down the stairs, smashing it. An inconsolable Dean suspends Jeff and bans him from campus. The dean holds a ceremony to make Willy an honorary professor, but Jeff sneaks in via a makeshift telepresence robot Elroy (Keith David) built. Jeff begs forgiveness from the dean and his comments about Willy make the warden inadvertently reveal that Willy was wrongly convicted and is appealing, meaning he was deliberately toying with the program. As Jeff lords this over Willy, they begin physically fighting with their telepresence robots. Though Willy wins, the dean intervenes to turn off Willy's device, only to then carry Jeff's away with him.

In the end tag, the Save Greendale Committee meets in the study room over the telepresence robots, with the convict program having been cancelled but the prison offering the existing robots for free. All of them have different problems with the system and each other, culminating in Abed overriding everyone else's connection and planning a robot uprising.

== Production ==
Multiple versions of the robots featuring in the episode were designed, with a company that made such robots coming in and showing the writers how they worked. Crew needed to operate the robots manually, outside of the frame, for dramatic moments where the robots moving with intention was necessary. Abed Gheith, with whom creator Dan Harmon worked on Channel 101, appeared in the episode as a janitor. He was the inspiration for Abed's character and originally auditioned for the role.

The writers workshopped different questions and answers that Garrett and other students could ask Willy about prison, including "Do you get to pick your own number?" The question "Does anyone ever get their head stuck between the bars?" was answered in the episode with "We call it getting metal ears", alternative answers considered including "You don't want to know about that" and "At least once a week".

== Critical reception ==
Eric Goldman of IGN rated the episode 8.3 out of 10, while Joshua Alston of The A.V. Club gave the episode a B rating. Joe Matar of Den of Geek and Evan Valentine of Collider both rated the episode three out of five stars. In a positive review, Entertainment Weekly's Keith Staskiewicz found the episode to feature "two solidly funny plots filled with plenty of typical but still very amusing japery".
