= Grifting 101 =

- Community episode
- Episode no.: Season 6 Episode 9
- Directed by: Rob Schrab
- Written by: Ryan Ridley
- Production code: 609
- Original air date: May 5, 2015
- Running time: 28 minutes

Guest appearances
- Paget Brewster as Francesca "Frankie" Dart; Keith David as Elroy Patashnik; Matt Berry as Roger DeSalvo; Ryan Ridley as Ryan Ridley

Episode chronology
← Previous "Intro to Recycled Cinema"	Next → "Basic RV Repair and Palmistry"
- Community season 6

"Grifting 101" is the ninth episode of the sixth season of the American comedy television series Community. The episode was written by Ryan Ridley and directed by Rob Schrab. It premiered on Yahoo Screen on May 5, 2015.

== Plot ==
Annie (Alison Brie) notices an upcoming class on grifting and, despite Jeff's (Joel McHale) protests that the class itself will be a grift, all of the group but Jeff signs up. The teacher, Roger DeSalvo (Matt Berry), tells the students to divide into pairs and practice repeatedly swapping briefcases over, the briefcases being "regulation briefcases" that he sold to them for $150 apiece. The group asks Jeff for help but he declines, smug that he was correct about the class.

Professor DeSalvo moves in to share an office with Jeff and begins to annoy him by telling Jeff that his faking a Juris Doctor degree makes him simply a liar, not a grifter. Jeff agrees to help the group plan a grift on DeSalvo. Their first attempt is the "African telegram", where Elroy (Keith David) pretends that he will give DeSalvo part of his newfound inheritance in exchange for loaning him money; their second is a fake winning lottery ticket. DeSalvo sees through both attempts easily.

Jeff admits to the group that he has no long-term grift and, demoralized, they watch The Sting. Afterwards, DeSalvo interrupts to mock them, so Britta (Gillian Jacobs) punches him in the face. DeSalvo runs away, but slips on a recently mopped floor and falls down a flight of stairs. Now in a wheelchair with a leg cast and arm sling, DeSalvo is given $50,000 in cash as compensation by the dean (Jim Rash) and Frankie (Paget Brewster). Britta meets with DeSalvo, the pair having planned DeSalvo to fake an injury as a grift, and kisses him while the group switches his briefcase of money for an empty one.

After DeSalvo attempts to find his briefcase, unamused by Leonard (Richard Erdman) spilling a tray of briefcases over him and a "briefcase parade" in which he can easily identify the one with money inside, he finds the group conversing with a police officer. The group tells him that he must either admit that he was grifted or owes the school $50,000 for claiming compensation for fake injuries. DeSalvo concedes and is fired by the dean.

== Production ==
Roger DeSalvo is played by Matt Berry; creator Dan Harmon was a fan of Berry's works including Garth Marenghi's Darkplace and Snuff Box. The episode is an homage to the 1973 film The Sting; it incorporates a ragtime score and iris shots. Harmon described the difference between homage and parody, as he saw it, as "a matter of love"; a homage merges examples of a genre together, rather than making specific references or recreating scenes exactly.

== Critical reception ==
Joshua Alston of The A.V. Club gave the episode a B rating, finding it a "solidly funny" episode. Alston praised Leonard and Chang's acting, but would have preferred a thematic title card to match the piano theme music. Alston found it similar to but lower quality than the season 2 episode "Conspiracy Theories and Interior Design". Joe Matar of Den of Geek rated the episode two stars out of five, criticising that it is "goofy" and "one-note". Matar additionally compared it to "Conspiracy Theories and Interior Design", due to its contrived twists and absurdity, and viewed it as a trend of high-concept episodes in season 6 being poor.

In a three star review, Collider's Evan Valentine praised Berry's "dry wit and delivery" and found each member of the group well-used, but believed that the episode would have been improved with a shorter runtime and that the group's initial grifts could have been funnier. Eric Goldman of IGN rated it 7.3 out of 10, finding the pacing slow at first and the dialogue referencing The Sting repetitive, but appreciating some moments as humorous and approving of the storyline's payoff.
