= Intro to Recycled Cinema =

- Community episode
- Episode no.: Season 6 Episode 8
- Directed by: Victor Nelli, Jr.
- Written by: Clay Lapari
- Production code: 608
- Original air date: April 28, 2015
- Running time: 28 minutes

Guest appearances
- Paget Brewster as Francesca "Frankie" Dart; Keith David as Elroy Patashnik; Richard Erdman as Leonard Briggs; Erik Charles Nielsen as Garrett Lambert; Brooke Burns as TV Host; Steve Guttenberg as Maury; Luke Youngblood as Magnitude; Randall Park as himself

Episode chronology
← Previous "Advanced Safety Features"	Next → "Grifting 101"
- Community season 6

"Intro to Recycled Cinema" is the eighth episode of the sixth season of the American comedy television series Community, and the 105th episode of the series overall. It was released on Yahoo Screen in the United States on April 28, 2015.

== Plot ==
Chang (Ken Jeong) has recently starred in a ham commercial where his catchphrase has gone viral, leading him to move out to Los Angeles without notifying anyone else, much to the Save Greendale Committee's disgust. Frankie (Paget Brewster) suggests that Greendale cash in on Chang's new-found fame by turning a cancelled cop drama Abed (Danny Pudi) was filming, Police Justice, into a new movie. An investor, Maury (Steve Guttenberg), tells them that they can use Chang's footage to create an entirely different experience and that a producer who did a similar task with Vin Diesel earned $500,000 in revenue. Abed reluctantly agrees, worrying that the film will be bad as they are given only one weekend to complete it.

Abed ends up directing various Greendale students in the film Chief Starr and the Raiders of the Galaxy, incorporating outtake audio and recycled footage of Chang. The dean (Jim Rash) stars as Chang's stand-in body double, Jeff (Joel McHale) plays the mayor of outer space, Britta (Gillian Jacobs) plays Princess Meridian, and Annie (Alison Brie) plays Scorpio 9, a pleasure droid assassin. Abed tries to do his usual repetitive takes, but everyone else wants to improvise every moment of the film and move on without reshoots. Noticing Abed's perfectionism, Jeff pulls him aside and convinces him that he needs to try different things then learn from them and move on, thereby getting the film on track.

The scattershot, poorly planned film manages to be completed, and an otherwise satisfied Maury tells Abed to edit out six minutes of footage. Everyone but Jeff agrees to cut out his prolonged death scene, as it does not feature Chang; refusing to let the one scene he put effort into go to waste, Jeff steals Abed's laptop and locks himself in the basement to edit out different portions. While Jeff watches video editing tutorials, Abed breaks into the room. They argue and briefly fight, after which Jeff confesses that he is suffering an identity crisis. With the departures of Pierce, Troy, Shirley, and Chang, Annie's and Abed's career plans, and Britta's bartending commitments, Jeff believes he will be the last one to ever leave Greendale. Abed consoles Jeff by telling him that no matter what crap Jeff goes through, there will always be a moment worth savoring.

They compromise by cutting out Jeff's scene and adding in an extended ending featuring Jeff taunting Chang. At the last minute, Maury informs the group that the company funding the film went bankrupt thanks to YouTube, plus Chang's credibility has tanked after going crazy with celebrities. Back in LA, a hungover Chang talks back to an unseen Steven Spielberg and is replaced by Randall Park; in the end tag, he awkwardly returns to Greendale.

== Cultural references ==
This episode parodies a scene from the original Star Wars when the characters fall into a trash compartment, as well as the films Raiders of the Lost Ark and Guardians of the Galaxy and actor Chris Pratt. The episode later lampoons the conventional distribution model of TV by suggesting the company set to distribute Abed's film just filed for bankruptcy because of the surge in online streaming. It also parodies The Big Bang Theory with Abed imitating Sheldon Cooper saying "bazinga" in a ball pit.

== Production ==
On February 9, 2015, Dan Harmon disclosed that Steve Guttenberg would be appearing on an episode of Community. On February 13, 2015, TV insider reported Guttenberg would play a Hollywood producer friend to Frankie. On April 7, 2015, the episode's title was first revealed during an interview with Yahoo's Robert Chan.

== Critical reception ==
Den of Geek says, "This is the closest we’ve yet come to an homage-style episode this season and it’s good, fresh ground for Community to cover." Hypable says, "After a relatively slow start, Community has really hit its stride mid-season with two stellar back-to-back episodes." Flavorwire says, "the 3AM release time doesn’t help," and suggests that perhaps the show would be better served releasing the episodes at a time of day when social media would have a bigger impact. IGN liked the premise of the episode, "The idea of Chang becoming a (very brief) star was amusing in and of itself, but it was how the Greendale gang reacted that really set the story in motion."
