= Modern Espionage =

- Community episode
- Episode no.: Season 6 Episode 11
- Directed by: Rob Schrab
- Written by: Mark Stegemann
- Production code: 611
- Original air date: May 19, 2015
- Running time: 28 minutes

Guest appearances
- Paget Brewster as Francesca "Frankie" Dart; Keith David as Elroy Patashnik; Kumail Nanjiani as Lapari; Mitch Hurwitz as Koogler; Erik Charles Nielsen as Garrett Lambert; Danielle Kaplowitz as Vicki; David Neher as Todd Jacobson; Dino Stamatopoulos as Starburns; Steve Agee as David

Episode chronology
| ← Previous "Basic RV Repair and Palmistry" | Next → "Wedding Videography" |
- Community season 6

"Modern Espionage" is the eleventh episode of the sixth season of the television sitcom Community. It was written by Mark Stegemann, and directed by Rob Schrab. It is the 108th episode overall and was first released on Yahoo Screen in the United States on May 19, 2015. The episode is the third "paintball episode" of the series after "Modern Warfare" (season one) and the two-part "A Fistful of Paintballs" / "For a Few Paintballs More" (season two).

== Plot ==
Starburns (Dino Stamatopoulos) leaves Vicki's (Danielle Kaplowitz) one-woman show and is accosted by Todd (David Neher) in the parking lot. They are both involved in a game of paintball assassin driven underground by Frankie's (Paget Brewster) "Cleaner Greendale" initiative. While Starburns gains the upper hand, both players are ultimately defeated by a mysterious player who shoots them with silver pellets.

The following morning Frankie asks Jeff (Joel McHale) to introduce an award to deputy custodian Lapari (Kumail Nanjiani) at the gala for a Cleaner Greendale in order to be seen as denouncing the underground game. Although he is reluctant, Jeff approaches the study group and asks them not to participate in the game. They all agree only to turn on Chang (Ken Jeong) when he reveals he is playing, revealing that they are all playing as well. Jeff is drawn into the game as he tries to prevent his friends from being shot.

Abed (Danny Pudi) discovers that the game is being run on an encrypted server with signs pointing to someone from City College being involved. The group decide to look for the secret player, Silver Ballz, and defeat him. They are given permission to go forward from Dean Pelton (Jim Rash), who feels irrelevant because of Frankie and dubs the group Deanforce 1.

While trying to track Silver Ballz, Abed and Annie (Alison Brie) are led to Koogler (Mitch Hurwitz). Abed manages to recover Koogler's encryption key, which reveals that Silver Ballz plans to ambush Lapari at the gala.

The group split up at the gala; Britta (Gillian Jacobs) and Elroy (Keith David) take out the kitchen staff who are all secretly playing but realize none of them are Silver Ballz. While presenting the award to Lapari, Jeff panics and shoots a non-playing audience member in front of Frankie. He is saved from punishment by the arrival of the dean, who was assigned a non-active role scouting the perimeter and realized that the custodial staff, finally fed up with the mess the Greendale students make during paintball, are the ones behind the new game. The gala erupts in a shoot out with only Lapari, Jeff, and the dean making it out.

Lapari lures Jeff and the dean into the Museum of Custodial Arts, where he reveals that he organized the game in order to fight against Frankie and her attempts to clean up Greendale and change the spirit of the school. He is caught off guard by the two when he mistakes them for mannequins that are part of the exhibit, leading to a standoff. His words convince the dean to turn on Jeff, but Jeff convinces the two of them that Frankie only wants what is best for the school. Frankie agrees not to fire any of them as long as they put their guns down; however, faced with the possibility of winning the final prize, they all shoot each other once Frankie is gone, meaning there is no true winner.

The following week, the group put on bibs and bonnets and pretend to be babies as punishment for not listening to Frankie.

In the end tag, Garrett (Erik Charles Nielsen) performs his one-man show mocking Vicki's one woman show, taking aim at the fact that she used her dead mother as material. His show is interrupted by Vicki herself who poignantly shares what her mother meant to her, only for Vicki and Garrett to reveal that it is all an act and that they will be performing together in a third play. Vicki's mother is in the audience and upon hearing she is alive, the audience boos.

== Cultural references ==
"Modern Espionage" features spy-movie homages and tropes, in contrast to the action movie setting of "Modern Warfare", the western setting of "A Fistful of Paintballs", and the Star Wars homages of "For a Few Paintballs More". The opening fight homages the action and costumes in the parking lot scene at the beginning of the first Highlander movie. The group's codenames are references to actors who have portrayed Batman in film, television, and animation, with Jeff as Michael Keaton, Britta as George Clooney, Abed as Christian Bale, Annie as Adam West, Elroy as Val Kilmer, and the Dean as "Voice of Diedrich Bader"; additionally, their collective chat is called the Belfry, referring to one of the Batman Family's headquarters. Jeff mentions Robert Downey Jr. and Iron Man. Lapari mispronounces M. Night Shyamalan's name and gets corrected by Abed. Garrett mentions comedian Andy Kaufman. Koogler references Fight Club. Frankie quotes Joseph Campbell. The scene where Dean Pelton is attacked in the elevator is a nod to a similar scene in Captain America: The Winter Soldier, a movie directed by Community producers/directors Joe and Anthony Russo, in which Danny Pudi cameos. The use of silver paintballs by Lapari and the "Museum of Custodial Arts" are both references to the 1974 James Bond film The Man with the Golden Gun, in which the antagonist Francisco Scaramanga, a dangerous international hitman and crack shot, uses special golden bullets and lures other skilled combatants to his funhouse island estate for one on one death games. The latter also includes a realistic mannequin of the British agent, which he impersonates in the finale to get the drop on Scaramanga.

== Production ==
On March 15, 2015, it was announced that the series began filming a third "paintball assassin" episode following the season one episode "Modern Warfare" and season two's two-part episode "A Fistful of Paintballs"/"For a Few Paintballs More".

== Critical reception ==
Joshua Alston of The A.V. Club gave the episode an "A" rating, calling it "fun and sharp", adding that "despite the revamped cast, [it] feels remarkably like old-school Community. Eric Goldman of IGN rated the episode a 9.5 of 10, stating "this quickly stands out as the best installment yet this year and a reminder of just how wonderful this show is. Overcoming the difficulties in doing yet another sequel episode to one of the most popular ideas the series has ever offered, "Modern Espionage" once again showed that paintball brings out the best in this series". Alan Sepinwall of HitFix claimed that the episode "made up in execution what it lacked in originality. It found an actual emotional story – the campus' reaction to all the changes Frankie has implemented, and all the responsibility she's taken away from the Dean – to wrap the paintball game around, and the various spy thriller tropes gave it a specificity in the same way that season 2's Spaghetti Western version had."
