= Ladders (Community) =

- Community episode
- Episode no.: Season 6 Episode 1
- Directed by: Rob Schrab
- Written by: Dan Harmon; Chris McKenna
- Production code: 602
- Original air date: March 17, 2015
- Running time: 27 minutes

Guest appearances
- Paget Brewster as Francesca "Frankie" Dart; Yvette Nicole Brown as Shirley Bennett; Steven Weber as Detective Butcher; Nathan Fillion as Bob Waite; David St. James as Professor Albrecht; Erik Charles Nielsen as Garrett; Richard Erdman as Leonard; Danielle Kaplowitz as Vicki; David Neher as Todd; Darsan Solomon as Dave; Will Hines as Jude Gippernut

Episode chronology
← Previous "Basic Sandwich"	Next → "Lawnmower Maintenance and Postnatal Care"
- Community season 6

"Ladders" is the first episode of the sixth season of the American comedy television series Community, and the ninety-eighth episode of the series overall. It was released on Yahoo Screen in the United States on March 17, 2015, along with the following episode, "Lawnmower Maintenance and Postnatal Care".

"Ladders" marks the departure of series regular Yvette Nicole Brown as Shirley Bennett, who left the series to care for her ill father. The episode also marks the first appearance of Paget Brewster as Francesca "Frankie" Dart as a recurring character.

== Plot ==
Accumulated weight from Frisbees on the roof of Greendale Community College cause the ceiling of the school's cafeteria to cave in. College Dean Craig Pelton (Jim Rash) is forced to hire administrative consultant Francesca "Frankie" Dart (Paget Brewster) to help organize and insure Greendale. Although Dart seems to get along with Abed (Danny Pudi) and the two form a partnership, she is soon opposed by the other Save Greendale Committee members, including Jeff (Joel McHale), Annie (Alison Brie) and Britta (Gillian Jacobs). The rest of the group doesn't trust her, as they feel she is meddling and that by "improving" Greendale as much as she is, she will fundamentally alter the school, with Jeff noting "How much can you improve Greendale before it stops being Greendale?"

After Dart calls for the banning of all alcohol on campus (as she cannot properly insure a school that permits alcohol on campus), Shirley's Sandwiches in the cafeteria is converted into a secret speakeasy where students and faculty can go for drinks. Despite wanting to work together with Dart and being the only member of the Committee to have befriended her and put his trust in her, Abed is eventually won over by his friends, spending much of his time at the speakeasy. Dart, who has figured out what is going on, resigns from her position as Greendale's administrative consultant after expressing her opinion that the Committee has a negative influence on Abed.

In the wake of Dart's resignation, the campus becomes much more laid-back, particularly in openly allowing alcoholic beverages on campus. However, this backfires when Annie and a teacher are accidentally injured in a classroom mishap, and the school discovers that since Dart resigned, it has no insurance to cover such accidents. Jeff and Abed decide to apologize to Dart, realizing the need for someone like her on campus to keep balance, and are able to convince her to return to her position at Greendale. Dart joins the Save Greendale Committee.

Elsewhere, former Save Greendale Committee member Shirley (Yvette Nicole Brown), who had left Greendale to watch after her ailing father and ended up becoming the personal chef to a troubled detective, saves her new employer (Steven Weber) from an attempted suicide and vows to help him solve the case that left him paralyzed and led to the loss of his wife. The episode's end tag is a closing scene for a fictional police procedural drama entitled The Butcher and the Baker, which follows the exploits of Shirley and her employer as crime-solving partners.

== Cultural references ==
The opening sequence flashback featuring Leonard (Richard Erdman) referenced the intro in Dazed and Confused with the song "Sweet Emotion" by the band, Aerosmith. Leonard's quote "Like tears in rain" is a quote from the character Roy Batty in the 1982 science-fiction film, Blade Runner. The episode also parodied the overuse of uplifting montages in pop culture, a film-making device that Abed said was "a movie apologizing for reality". The underground bar (started by the study group to oppose Frankie's mission) where characters dress in 1920s attire and drink alcohol is a reference to the 1920s era response to the Prohibition era when bootleggers surreptitiously traded in alcohol in defiance of the ban.

== Production ==
In May 2014, Community was canceled by NBC, its original broadcast network. Due to the show's cult status and fanbase, there was considerable speculation that the show would be picked up by another network such as Netflix or Hulu.

In June 2014, it was announced that Yahoo Screen would be producing a sixth season consisting of 13 new episodes, keeping the show's cast and crew intact under show creator and executive producer Dan Harmon. "Ladders" is the first episode of Community to air on Yahoo! Screen instead of NBC. Harmon stated:

"I am very pleased that Community will be returning for its predestined sixth season on Yahoo. I look forward to bringing our beloved NBC sitcom to a larger audience by moving it online. I vow to dominate our new competition. Rest easy, Big Bang Theory. Look out, Bang Bus!"

Following Yvette Nicole Brown's departure from the series to care for her ill father, the series added two new actors, Paget Brewster as Francesca "Frankie" Dart, an insurance consultant hired to help repair the school, and Keith David as retired scientist Elroy Patashnik. Brewster and David had both previously appeared on the series in different capacities, with Brewster playing Debra Chambers in "Analysis of Cork-Based Networking", and David in a voice-over role as the narrator in "Pillows and Blankets". Guest stars Jonathan Banks, who played the criminology professor Buzz Hickey in the fifth season, and John Oliver, who played Professor Duncan, did not return as they were involved in other projects, Better Call Saul and Last Week Tonight, respectively. Production for the series began on November 17, 2014. The presence of the load-bearing columns added in the construction of the new cafeteria was explained by the production moving from the old Paramount Studios set to the new CBS set (which contained these obtruding pillars) to film the sixth season.

Harmon stated that the runtime for each episode is "flexible" due to the lack of the network-controlled commercial breaks and time slot. Harmon added that the change in platform brings with it a creative license to show content that would normally be restricted on a network, qualifying the lack of restriction by saying, "It's kind of funny because these regulations aren't being imposed on us by an industry anymore, we're out in the middle of this field, but we're immediately finding these rules on our own anyway." "Ladders" was filmed and released together with the second episode, "Lawnmower Maintenance and Postnatal Care".

== Critical reception ==
"Ladders" received generally positive reviews from critics. Alan Sepinwall of HitFix called the episode "so busy dealing with exposition and meta-commentary about departed actors and changed situations [...] that it doesn't have a ton of room for big laughs, even as it wisely only tries to introduce Paget Brewster's Frankie into the ensemble, saving Keith David's Elroy for 'Lawnmower Maintenance and Postnatal Care'".
