= B. K. Cannon =

American actor

- Born: Barbara Kimberly Cannon; August 27, 1990 (age 35); Kailua, Hawaii
- Years active: 2005–present
- Known for: Switched at Birth

Barbara-Kimberly Cannon (born August 27, 1990) is an American actress known for Switched at Birth and Why Women Kill. She is from Kailua, Honolulu, Hawaii. A survivor of childhood neuroblastoma, Cannon became a volunteer and later director of the "Camp Ānuenue" non-profit retreat for children dealing with cancer based in the North Shore of Oahu.

== Early life ==
Cannon was born in Kailua, Hawaii. At age 3 she was diagnosed with neuroblastoma. She became a camper at "Camp Ānuenue", which later inspired her to become a volunteer there. When funding was pulled from the facility, she became a director and created the 501(c)(3) organization.

== Career ==
Cannon's first onscreen appearances were on the Flight 29 Down series, and its The Hotel Tango movie sequel. In 2010, she appeared in a commercial for Call of Duty: Black Ops. She followed this up playing the recurring character Mary Beth Tucker on Switched at Birth from 2013 to 2017. In 2015, she starred as Melissa Stanton on Yahoo! Screen's Sin City Saints. In 2021, she played Dee, the daughter of main character Alma, on the second season of Why Women Kill.

== Filmography ==
=== Film ===
Year	Title	Role	Notes
2012	We the Party	Jackie	
2014	Mall: A Day to Kill	Sales Girl	
2024	Road House	Laura	

=== Television ===
Year	Title	Role	Notes
2005	Flight 29 Down	Jory Cavanaugh	2 episodes
2008	Grey’s Anatomy	Girl Band Geek	Episode: “I Will Follow You Into The Dark
2008	House	Natalie	Episode: "Joy to the World"
2009	ER	Tammy	Episode: "A Long, Strange Trip"
2011	Criminal Minds	Julie Parker	Episode: "I Love You, Tommy Brown"
2013-2017	Switched at Birth	Mary Beth Tucker	
2015	Sin City Saints	Melissa Stanton/Emily Stanton	8 episodes
2016	Bones	Sammy Mills	Episode: "The Strike in the Chord"
2017	Chicago Fire	Darla Thompson	Episode: "Who Lives and Who Dies"
2019-2020	The Politician	Kris	
2021	Why Women Kill	Dee Fillcot	
