= Sin City Saints =

American sitcom television series

- Genre: Sitcom
- Created by: Chris Case; Bryan Gordon; Michael Tollin
- Directed by: Bryan Gordon; Fred Savage
- Starring: Malin Åkerman; Andrew Santino; Keith Powers; Justin Chon; B. K. Cannon; Rick Fox; Tom Arnold
- Country of origin: United States
- Original language: English
- No. of seasons: 1
- No. of episodes: 8

Production
- Executive producers: Chris Case; Bryan Gordon; Michael Tollin
- Producers: Alec Chorches; Billy Crawford; Dan Kaplow; Brendan Finnigan
- Production location: Las Vegas, Nevada
- Cinematography: Anthony R. Palmieri
- Editor: Les Butler
- Camera setup: Single-camera
- Running time: 20-23 minutes
- Production companies: Mandalay Sports Media; Yahoo! Studios

Original release
- Network: Yahoo! Screen
- Release: March 23, 2015

Sin City Saints is an American sitcom television series starring Malin Åkerman, Andrew Santino, and Keith Powers. It debuted on Yahoo! Screen on March 23, 2015. Its eight-episode first season was directed by Bryan Gordon and Fred Savage. The series follows a fictional Las Vegas basketball franchise.

Its executive producers are Bryan Gordon, Mike Tollin, and Chris Case. The series ended following Yahoo! Screen's closure due to low viewership in the following year.

== Premise ==
Sin City Saints follows "wealthy tech businessman Jake Tullus, the unpredictable and charismatic owner of Vegas’ new professional basketball franchise, the Sin City Saints."

== Cast ==
=== Starring ===
- Malin Åkerman as Dusty Halford
- Andrew Santino as Jake Tullus
- Keith Powers as LaDarius Pope
- Justin Chon as Byron Summers
- B.K. Cannon as Melissa Stanton
- Rick Fox as Sam Johnson
- Tom Arnold as Kevin Freeman

=== Recurring ===
- Ryan Cartwright as Wade Leatherbee (8 episodes)
- Toby Huss as Coach Doug (8 episodes)
- Paul Duke as Artahk Sundovk (7 episodes)
- Baron Davis as Billy Crane (7 episodes)
- Aaron Takahashi as Henry (6 episodes)
- Chris Gehrt as Todd (6 episodes)
- Jill Bartlett as Sapphire (6 episodes)
- Jean Louisa Kelly as Bernice Pope (5 episodes)
- Michael Liu as Wu Lee (5 episodes)
- Rosalind Chao as Mrs. Wu (5 episodes)
- John Salley as Tom (4 episodes)
- Brendan Jennings as Andy the Mascot (3 episodes)

=== Guest stars ===
- Adam Devine as Matty ("You Booze, You Lose")
- Dan Bakkedahl as Dan ("Urine God's Hands Now")

== Episodes ==
No.	Title	Directed by	Written by	Original release date
1	"The Fool Monty"	Bryan Gordon	Chris Case	March 23, 2015
League attorney Dusty Halford arrives in Las Vegas to oversee Sin City Saints owner Jake Tullus following the injury of star player LaDarius Pope. Magician-comedian Penn Jillette and standup comic Carrot Top cameo as themselves.
2	"Smoke and Mirrors"	Bryan Gordon	Chris Case	March 23, 2015
The Saints recruit former star Billy Crane, who now runs a burger franchise.
3	"Gone Catfishing"	Bryan Gordon	Chris Case	March 23, 2015
Jake believes that a fiancee LaDarius has never met except online may not be real.
4	"Mrs. Wu's Tang"	Bryan Gordon	Ken Cheng	March 23, 2015
Jake and Dusty each try to recruit Chinese star Wu Lee, who is managed by his domineering mother.
5	"A Basket Full of Rainbows"	Fred Savage	Chris Case	March 23, 2015
A locker-room rant by Coach Doug goes viral, prompting Jake to ask for his resignation.
6	"You Booze, You Lose"	Fred Savage	Chris Case	March 23, 2015
Taunted by a radio-show host, Jake vows not to use drugs, drink alcohol or have sex until the Saints win a game.
7	"Urine God's Hands Now"	Bryan Gordon	Jack Amiel	March 23, 2015
Seeking funding for a new arena, Jake woos a conservative-Christian city councilman. A recovered Darius must pass a urine test.
8	"Because Vegas"	Bryan Gordon	Chris Case & Noelle Valdivia	March 23, 2015
When the stock of Jake's technology company, Matterhorn, tanks, Jake must find a way to keep the team.

== Production ==
Yahoo! Inc. announced its first original long-form programs, the comedies Sin City Saints and Other Space, in April 2014 at the 2014 Digital Content NewFronts. By early October, production on Sin City Saints had begun at The Orleans Hotel and Casino. Eight episodes were released simultaneously on Yahoo! Screen on March 23, 2015.

== Reception ==
=== Critical ===
Mike Hale in The New York Times called the show "a comedy less coherent than the halftime scoreboard video at an NBA game", where "[p]lot points and jokes feel as if they came from index cards grabbed at random." Keith Uhlich at The Hollywood Reporter felt the "manic, mostly unfunny half-hour sports comedy" featured "sub-Tracy and Hepburn bickering ... that barely elicits a smirk, let alone busts a gut", and called the casting "problematic.... Both Akerman and Santino are irritatingly one-note."

=== Financial ===
On October 21, 2015, Yahoo CFO Ken Goldman announced during a Q3 Earnings Phone Call that their original programming lineup last spring resulted in a $42 million writeoff, including season six of Community and Other Space.

== See also ==
- List of original programs distributed by Yahoo! Screen
