= List of Yahoo Screen original programming =

Yahoo! Originals logo.

Beginning in 2011, Yahoo.com distributed some original programs through its Yahoo Screen service.

In Spring 2015, Yahoo! began to expand their original programming efforts by producing their first longform scripted series with runtimes between 20 and 30 minutes. These shows included Sin City Saints, Other Space, and the sixth season of the NBC series Community.

On January 4, 2016, following a $42 million write-down in the third quarter of 2015 as a result of the poor performance of its three original series, Yahoo! Screen as a portal was discontinued. Yahoo's original video content was re-located to relevant portals of the site; in particular, its original television series were moved to an "originals" section on the Yahoo! TV site.

== Original programming ==
=== Drama ===
Title	Genre	Premiere	Seasons	Length	Status
Electric City	Animation/Science fiction	July 17, 2012	1 season, 20 episodes	4–5 min.	Ended
Cybergeddon	Thriller	September 25, 2012	1 season, 9 episodes	7–13 min.	Ended

=== Comedy ===
Title	Genre	Premiere	Seasons	Length	Status
Burning Love	Romantic comedy parody	June 3, 2012	3 seasons, 42 episodes	10 min.	Ended
The Fuzz	Police procedural parody	September 9, 2013	1 season, 5 episodes	TBA	Ended
Ghost Ghirls	Supernatural	September 9, 2013	1 season, 12 episodes	12 min.	Ended
Tiny Commando	Comedy	September 9, 2013	1 season, 12 episodes	3–6 min.	Ended
We Need Help	Comedy	September 9, 2013	1 season, 9 episodes	TBA	Ended
Sin City Saints	Sports	March 23, 2015	1 season, 8 episodes	20–23 min.	Ended
Other Space	Sci-fi	April 14, 2015	1 season, 8 episodes	25–27 min.	Ended

=== Continuations ===
Title	Genre	Prev. network(s)	Premiere	Seasons	Length	Status
Community (season 6)	Situational comedy	NBC	March 17, 2015	1 season, 13 episodes	24–30 min.	Ended

=== Reality ===
Title	Genre	Premiere	Seasons	Length	Status
The Yo Show on Yahoo!	Pop Culture/Entertainment news	TBA	TBA	TBA	Ended
omg! NOW	News	TBA	TBA	TBA	Ended
Blue Ribbon Hunter	Food/Travel	2011	2 seasons	TBA	Ended
Chow Ciao!	Cooking	2011	2 seasons	TBA	Ended
Let's Talk About Love	Relationship/Advice	October 2011	2 seasons	TBA	Ended
Reluctantly Healthy	Health/Fitness	October 2011	2 seasons	TBA	Ended
The Failure Club	Human interest	November 2011	2 seasons	TBA	Ended
Cinema & Spice	Cooking	September 9, 2013	1 season, 20 episodes	TBA	Ended
Fashion Recipe	Cooking	September 9, 2013	1 season, 20 episodes	TBA	Ended
Grill Girls	Cooking	September 9, 2013	1 season, 20 episodes	TBA	Ended
Losing It with John Stamos	Comedy/Talk show	September 9, 2013	1 season, 20 episodes	5–7 min.	Ended

=== Live sports ===
Title	Genre	Premiere	Seasons	Length
NFL on Yahoo!	Sports	October 25, 2015	2 seasons, 2 episodes	180 min.

== Cancelled original programming ==
Logo for The Pursuit.

Upon Yahoo! Screen's closure, a number of projects in development by Yahoo! were subsequently cancelled. One of the few series that were previously announced was a comedy series entitled The Pursuit. The show was set to be produced by Scott Stuber and Beth McCarthy-Miller. It would have followed "a group of friends in their late 20s who are living in Manhattan and pursuing success, love, wealth and happiness".

Before the fall 2015 television season, Yahoo! had been in negotiations with 20th Century Fox Television to revive then-recently cancelled comedy series Enlisted for a second season. Yahoo! eventually passed on the revival over budgetary concerns.
