= Carol & the End of the World =

American animated television miniseries

- Genre: Adult animation; Apocalyptic; Comedy drama; Tragicomedy
- Created by: Dan Guterman
- Voices of: Martha Kelly; Beth Grant; Lawrence Pressman; Kimberly Hébert Gregory; Mel Rodriguez; Bridget Everett; Michael Chernus; Sean Giambrone; Laurie Metcalf
- Music by: Joe Wong
- Countries of origin: Canada; United States
- Original language: English
- No. of episodes: 10

Production
- Executive producers: Dan Guterman; Donick Cary
- Producer: Dayla Kennedy
- Editors: James Atkinson; Bess Thompson; Annie De Brock
- Running time: 25–33 minutes
- Production companies: Netflix Animation Studios; Bardel Entertainment

Original release
- Network: Netflix
- Release: December 15, 2023

Carol & the End of the World (stylized as carol & the end of the world) is an adult animated comedy drama television miniseries created by Dan Guterman for Netflix. Produced by Bardel Entertainment, it was released on December 15, 2023.

The series is based on the premise of planetary collisions. The planet Earth is about to collide with the fictional planet Keppler, and human extinction is inevitable. Most humans attempt to fulfil their lifelong dreams before they die. But former secretary Carol Kohl instead finds a way to pass the time by joining a group of office workers who crunch numbers for products that seemingly do not exist.

The series featured Kimberly Hébert Gregory's final role before her death in 2025.

== Premise ==
A mysterious planet is hurtling toward Earth, and the world has erupted into a chaotic, hedonistic free-for-all as people prepare for the upcoming apocalypse. While most people live their final days to the fullest, a quiet woman named Carol is searching for meaning as the end draws near.

== Voice cast and characters ==
=== Main ===
- Martha Kelly as Carol Kohl, a middle-aged woman who has no desire to seize the day as the world is ending
- Beth Grant as Pauline Kohl, Carol's mother
- Lawrence Pressman as Bernard Kohl, Carol's father
- Kimberly Hébert Gregory as Donna Shaw, Carol's co-worker who becomes friends with Carol. She is the mother of five now adult children and used to run a nail salon.
- Mel Rodriguez as Luis, Carol's co-worker who lives in the same building as Donna. He spent most of his life traveling.
- Bridget Everett as Elena, Carol's adventurous older sister
- Michael Chernus as Eric, a stranger who shows romantic feelings towards Carol after spending a night together
- Sean Giambrone as Steven, Eric's teenage son
- Laurie Metcalf as HR lady, the head of human resources at the office building where Carol, Donna, and Luis work

=== Supporting ===
- Delbert Hunt as Michael, Bernard's nurse who is also in a relationship with Pauline and Bernard
- Megan Mullally as Janette, Carol's old friend
- Gillian Jacobs as Lisa, Carol's old friend

== Episodes ==
| No. | Title | Directed by | Written by | Original release date |
|---|---|---|---|---|
| 1 | "Pilot" | Erica Hayes | Dan Guterman; Kevin Arrieta | December 15, 2023 |
With a mysterious planet called Keppler hurtling towards the Earth, all of humanity begins fulfilling their lifelong dreams before the world inevitably ends in less than a year. 42-year old former middle-school secretary Carol Kohl, meanwhile, worries her family by spending her days lingering outside Applebee's rather than living her dreams. With her whole family exploring the world, Carol falls into melancholy and goes on a date with single father Eric. Not wanting to die alone, Eric proposes to Carol, scaring her and she cuts him off. While wandering the near-abandoned city, Carol discovers an office building full of employees going about their day like before Keppler appeared.
| 2 | "The Distraction" | Mollie Helms | Dan Guterman; Kevin Arrieta | December 15, 2023 |
Happy to get back to a routine, Carol joins the office unofficially known as "the Distraction", where employees (who all ignore each other) crunch numbers for products that seemingly do not exist. Hoping to prove herself to the managers, Carol scours abandoned office supplies stores for ink toner to fix their copier. Not wanting to lose the Distraction, she holds a friend who has the ink toner at gunpoint. Carol returns to the office and is offered a full-time position, and a single employee, Donna, introduces herself to her, advising Carol not to ask how the office works, as they all need it.
| 3 | "Throuple" | Bert Youn | Dan Guterman; Kevin Arrieta | December 15, 2023 |
Carol's parents, Bernard and Pauline, and their lover, Michael, find their cruise around the world abandoned by the ship's captain, who regrets his life at sea. At the Distraction, Carol attempts to become closer with Donna, eventually forming a friendship with her and another employee, Luis. Luis brings them to an abandoned tanning salon where the three bond over missed opportunities, wondering what the point of their choices were now that they are all going to die.
| 4 | "Sisters" | Erica Hayes | Dan Guterman; Kevin Arrieta | December 15, 2023 |
Carol's sister Elena visits, insisting they see a waterfall listed as one of the places you have to see before you die. Elena records their entire hike there, annoying Carol. The two, never having been close, eventually resolve their issues in private with the camcorder off, and reach the falls only to find the waterfall is gone. The two still appreciate the hike here that brought them closer and the view from atop the mountain.
| 5 | "David" | Mollie Helms | Dan Guterman; Kevin Arrieta | December 15, 2023 |
Hoping to become closer to her co-workers, Carol learns the names of everyone in the building. When she finds a co-worker named David has died at his desk, she asks Donna and Luis to help her inform his loved ones. Discovering that all his loved ones are either dead or did not care for him, the trio decides to scatter his ashes from the Distraction building's roof. Several other co-workers join them, moved by Carol's speech about how, despite all that is happening, they all still want to come here and be together.
| 6 | "Holidays" | Erica Hayes | Dan Guterman; Kevin Arrieta | December 15, 2023 |
People begin celebrating every holiday that will not arrive before Keppler kills them. At her family's Christmas party, Donna regrets not having spent enough time with her kids, having always been working. Luis celebrates his birthday alone. Carol finds a trick-or-treating child, who lives alone and spends his days collecting candy. Carol's neighbors adopt the trick-or-treater.
| 7 | "The Beetle Broach" | Bert Youn | Dan Guterman; Kevin Arrieta; Noah Prestwich | December 15, 2023 |
Carol, Donna, and Luis go through the lost and found, the stories of several employees being explored. It is revealed the CEO of the Distraction owned a company in the building before Keppler, never processing it and continuing to work as normal while everyone else left. Seeing the building's lights on, others began to join him.
| 8 | "The Life & Times of Bashiir Hassan" | Mollie Helms | Dan Guterman; Kevin Arrieta; Noah Prestwich | December 15, 2023 |
Bernard, Pauline, and Michael's cruise ship is raided by pirates, who wish to take all their luxury food and activities. When a storm threatens them, the pirates and vacationers band together to survive, all reaching America as fire-forged friends. Eric's son Steven says he is going to go live with his mother Brooke in Niagara Falls, not wanting to see his father spend his last remaining days crying over missing Carol and Brooke. The two bond over the road trip there, and Steven tearfully reveals he does not know where his mother is. Eric is overjoyed that he will get to spend his last few months with his son.
| 9 | "Saltwater Lullaby: A Surf Odyssey" | Erica Hayes | Written by : Dan Guterman; Kevin Arrieta; Noah Prestwich; Story by : Dan Guterman; Kevin Arrieta; Noah Prestwich; Donick Cary | December 15, 2023 |
Carol narrates an expanded version of a lie she told her parents about learning to surf so as to not worry them that she will die with her life unfulfilled. She tells the story of how, in the search for the perfect wave, she made friends, reconnected with old loves, and saw the world, but is ultimately unable to find fulfillment. After an encounter with a drunken psych-ward patient on a beach in Peru, she realizes all the waves she has surfed are "perfect waves", rekindling her supposed love of surfing.
| 10 | "The Investigation" | Bert Youn | Dan Guterman; Kevin Arrieta; Noah Prestwich | December 15, 2023 |
Carol invites Donna and Luis to join her at Applebee's, with Carol tending the bar. Other employees get word, and soon this evolves into a weekly happy hour, with everyone at the Distraction finally becoming friends with one another. The employees all cry at one point, finally processing that the people they have come to love will die soon. Still, Carol and her Distraction co-workers continue with work and happy hour at Applebee's until Keppler arrives.

== Release ==
The 10-episode miniseries was released on December 15, 2023, on Netflix.

== Nominations ==
Carol & the End of the World received a nomination for Outstanding Limited or Anthology Series at the 36th GLAAD Media Awards.

== Reception ==
On the review aggregator website Rotten Tomatoes, the series holds a 100% approval rating with an average rating of 8.3/10, based on 18 critic reviews. The website's critics consensus reads, "With the tone set by Martha Kelly's dour wit, Carol & the End of the World is a clever and surprisingly approachable spin on the apocalypse." Metacritic, which uses a weighted average, assigned a score of 79 out of 100 based on 6 critics, indicating "generally favorable reviews".

Jenna Scherer of The A.V. Club gave the series an A− and said, "Carol & The End Of The World is funny, yes, and there's plenty of absurd slapstick; but at its core, this is a patient, meditative series about what it means to be a person living among other people".
