= Losing It with John Stamos =

- Genre: Talk show
- Created by: Morgan Spurlock; John Stamos
- Written by: Mike Scollins
- Directed by: Antonio Scarlata
- Presented by: John Stamos
- Country of origin: United States
- Original language: English
- No. of seasons: 1
- No. of episodes: 20

Production
- Executive producers: John Stamos; Jeremy Chilnick; Morgan Spurlock
- Editor: Brian Nils Johnson
- Running time: 5–7 minutes
- Production companies: St. Amos Productions; Warrior Poets

Original release
- Network: Yahoo! Screen
- Release: September 9 – October 28, 2013

Losing It with John Stamos is an American web television talk show hosted by actor John Stamos. The show debuted on September 9, 2013.

== Background ==
With the show, Stamos "sits down with a celebrity, who regales him with a story about turning in his or her v-card. Occasionally, bits are re-enacted by cute cartoon characters or puppets." Stamos had originally pitched the show thirteen years earlier to MTV. In its earlier incarnation, celebrities such as Rebecca Romijn, David Boreanez, and Snoop Dogg participated. That iteration of show was ultimately not ordered to series due to an inability to attract enough celebrity guests.

The show was originally announced as a part of Yahoo's 2013 Newfront comedy slate.

== Future ==
Stamos commented that had hopes that the series could evolve outward from its web series beginnings and expressed frustrations with the time constraints imposed by Yahoo!. He discussed plans for a syndicated version of the show that would run 22 minutes.

== Episodes ==
No.	Title	Guests	Original release date
1	"Episode 1"	Matt Stone	September 9, 2013
2	"Episode 2"	Michael Rapaport	September 9, 2013
3	"Episode 3"	Alan Cumming	September 9, 2013
4	"Episode 4"	Perez Hilton	September 9, 2013
5	"Episode 5"	Adam Pally	September 9, 2013
6	"Episode 6"	Jeff Ross	September 9, 2013
7	"Episode 7"	Casey Wilson	September 9, 2013
8	"Episode 8"	Michael Ian Black	September 9, 2013
9	"Episode 9"	Olivia Munn	September 9, 2013
10	"Episode 10"	Bob Saget	September 9, 2013
11	"Episode 11"	Michael Vartan	October 14, 2013
12	"Episode 12"	Paul Feig	October 14, 2013
13	"Episode 13"	Eliza Coupe	October 14, 2013
14	"Episode 14"	Denise Richards	October 21, 2013
15	"Episode 15"	Shiri Appleby	October 21, 2013
16	"Episode 16"	Chris Parnell	October 21, 2013
17	"Episode 17"	TJ Miller	October 21, 2013
18	"Episode 18"	Stacey Dash	October 28, 2013
19	"Episode 19"	Dave Coulier	October 28, 2013
20	"Episode 20"	Wayne Brady	October 28, 2013

== See also ==
- List of original programs distributed by Yahoo! Screen
