= Dan Guterman =

American screenwriter and television producer

- Born: November 20, 1981 (age 44); Brazil
- Occupation: Television writer
- Writing career
- Period: 1999–present
- Genre: Humor

Dan Guterman (born November 20, 1981) is a Brazilian-born television writer and producer who has lived in Canada and the United States. He was a writer for the satirical website The Onion between 1999 and 2010. He has also worked on The Colbert Report, Community, and Rick and Morty. Guterman has won two Emmy Awards: one in 2013 for his work on The Colbert Report and one in 2018 for his work on season three of Rick and Morty. He also won an Annie Award in 2018 for co-writing the Rick and Morty episode "The Ricklantis Mixup".

== Life and career ==
Born in Brazil on November 20, 1981, Guterman became interested in comedy after watching Saturday Night Live and The Kids in the Hall when he moved to Montreal at age 7—shows that, he said, "genuinely frightened me", as comedy in Brazil was mostly lighthearted in tone.

Having become a writer himself, Guterman later described his profession in writing comedy by saying, "You’re doing this very creative, often very personal thing, but you’re expected to produce it in this totally noncreative way. My job is to churn out comedy, which is this intangible and temperamental thing, but at the rate and consistency of an assembly-line worker." After establishing his television writing presence as a writer on The Colbert Report and receiving an Emmy, Guterman began work with Dan Harmon on Community for its fifth season. This relationship continued, and in 2015 Guterman went on to write for both the sixth and second seasons of Community and Rick and Morty, respectively. He then continued work writing for Rick and Morty's third season, writing the episode "The Ricklantis Mixup" and assisting on several others. Guterman co-wrote "Morty's Mind Blowers", which is referenced within the episode as the replacement to "Interdimensional Cable".

In 2018, Guterman was brought in as a consultant to work on Inside Job, an animated show for Netflix.

Guterman has also worked on At Home With Amy Sedaris and Another Period, as well as various films.

In addition to his television writing career, Guterman penned a short piece for The New Yorker called "New Optical Illusions" .

== Credits ==
Print

- The Onion (1999–2010) – writer, head writer
- Our Dumb World: The Onion's Atlas of the Planet Earth, 73rd Edition (2007)
- America Again: Re-Becoming the Greatness We Never Weren't (2012)
- The Onion Book of Known Knowledge: A Definitive Encyclopaedia Of Existing Information (2013)

Television

- The Colbert Report (2011–14) – writer
- Community (2014–15) – executive story editor, writer
  - "Bondage and Beta Male Sexuality"
  - "Basic RV Repair and Palmistry"
- Rick and Morty (2015–17) – producer, co-executive producer, writer
  - "The Ricks Must Be Crazy"
  - "Interdimensional Cable 2: Tempting Fate" (with Ryan Ridley & Justin Roiland)
  - "The Ricklantis Mixup" (with Ryan Ridley)
  - "Morty's Mind Blowers" (with Mike McMahan, James Siciliano, Ryan Ridley, Justin Roiland, & Dan Harmon)
- Carol & The End of The World (2023) – creator, writer
