= Yahoo Screen =

Defunct on-demand streaming service

Yahoo! Video, Screen, and View
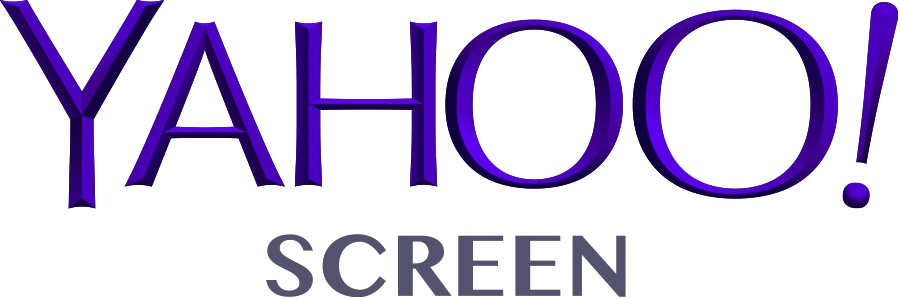
- Website type: Video on-demand
- Dissolved: June 30, 2019; 7 years ago
- Owner: Yahoo!
- Parent: Verizon Media
- Commercial: Yes
- Registration: Optional
- Launched: June 1, 2006; 20 years ago (as Yahoo! Video)
- Current status: Closed

Yahoo! Screen (also known as Yahoo! Video. Yahoo! Screen, and Yahoo! View), a video hosting service, was established in 2006. The company Yahoo ran several similar video services. Later, the ability to upload videos was removed, changing it to a more pure video on demand service; the website became a portal for curated video content hosted by Yahoo's properties. In 2011, the service was re-launched as Yahoo! Screen, placing a larger focus on original content and web series. Created for the service were the series Burning Love, Electric City, Ghost Ghirls, Losing It with John Stamos, Sin City Saints, and Other Space. Yahoo! Screen also acquired the sitcom Community for an additional season, following its cancellation after its fifth season on NBC. In January 2016, following a $42 million write-down on the poor performance of its original content, Yahoo! Screen was shut down. In August 2016, Yahoo! announced a partnership with the subscription video-on-demand service Hulu to move its free video library to a de facto successor known as Yahoo! View. Yahoo! View streamed recent episodes of television series from the ABC, NBC, and Fox networks in the United States, as well as a moderate selection of archived programs from various distributors, the "skinny bundle" model. Yahoo! View was decommissioned on June 30, 2019.

== History ==
Yahoo! Video was intended to be as a video sharing website on which users could upload videos, similar to YouTube. At launch, Yahoo! Video started as an internet-wide video search engine. Yahoo added the ability to upload and share video clips in June 2006. A re-designed site was launched in February 2008 that changed the focus to Yahoo!-hosted video only.

On December 15, 2010, Yahoo! Video's functionality to upload video was removed for its relaunch as Yahoo! Screen the following year. All user-generated content was removed on March 15, 2011. The content that Yahoo! deleted was saved by the Archive Team. The Yahoo! Screen rebrand was launched October 2011, alongside eight original programs. Yahoo! Screen has streamed three seasons of its Emmy-nominated original series, Burning Love, which was syndicated for TV through E! in 2013.

On April 24, 2013, Yahoo! acquired rights to stream content from the NBC series Saturday Night Live, including archive clips from current and past seasons, behind the scenes footage, and other content. Yahoo! held non-exclusive international rights to the archive content, and non-exclusive rights to clips from the current season.

In June 2014, Yahoo! announced that it had picked up former NBC sitcom Community for its sixth season, which premiered via Yahoo! Screen on March 17, 2015. Within a month of Community's season six premiere, Yahoo! had premiered full first seasons of two new original series, Sin City Saints and Other Space, but available only in the United States. Also in 2014, Yahoo! expanded its licensing agreement with Vevo to allow Vevo's content (music videos, concerts, etc.) to appear on the platform. Community ultimately would not be as profitable for the company as it hoped with The A.V. Club blaming the acquisition for the platform's eventual demise.

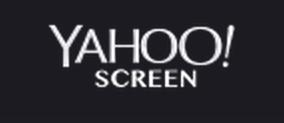
Former logo as Yahoo! Screen

In June 2015, Yahoo! Screen won the worldwide rights to distribute the National Football League's International Series game between the Buffalo Bills and Jacksonville Jaguars, set to take place October 25. The one-off stream was the first NFL game to be broadcast almost exclusively through the Internet, with no television broadcast outside Buffalo, Jacksonville and other international markets.

On January 4, 2016, following a $42 million write-down in the third quarter of 2015, as a result of the poor performance of its three original series, Yahoo! Screen as a portal was discontinued. Yahoo's original video content was re-located to relevant portals of the site; in particular, its original television series were moved to an "originals" section on the Yahoo! TV site.

On August 8, 2016, Hulu announced they would end their free viewing tier and move exclusively to a subscription service. That same day, they announced a partnership with Yahoo! to spin out its free video on demand streaming service, which features recent episodes of series from ABC, NBC, and Fox, into a new service known as Yahoo! View. It features the five most recent episodes of the networks' series; new episodes are added eight days after their original broadcast. It also integrated with Tumblr to provide access to fan content related to programs.

Yahoo View! ceased operations on June 30, 2019.

== See also ==
- List of Yahoo Screen original programming
