= Paget Brewster =

American actress and singer (born 1969)

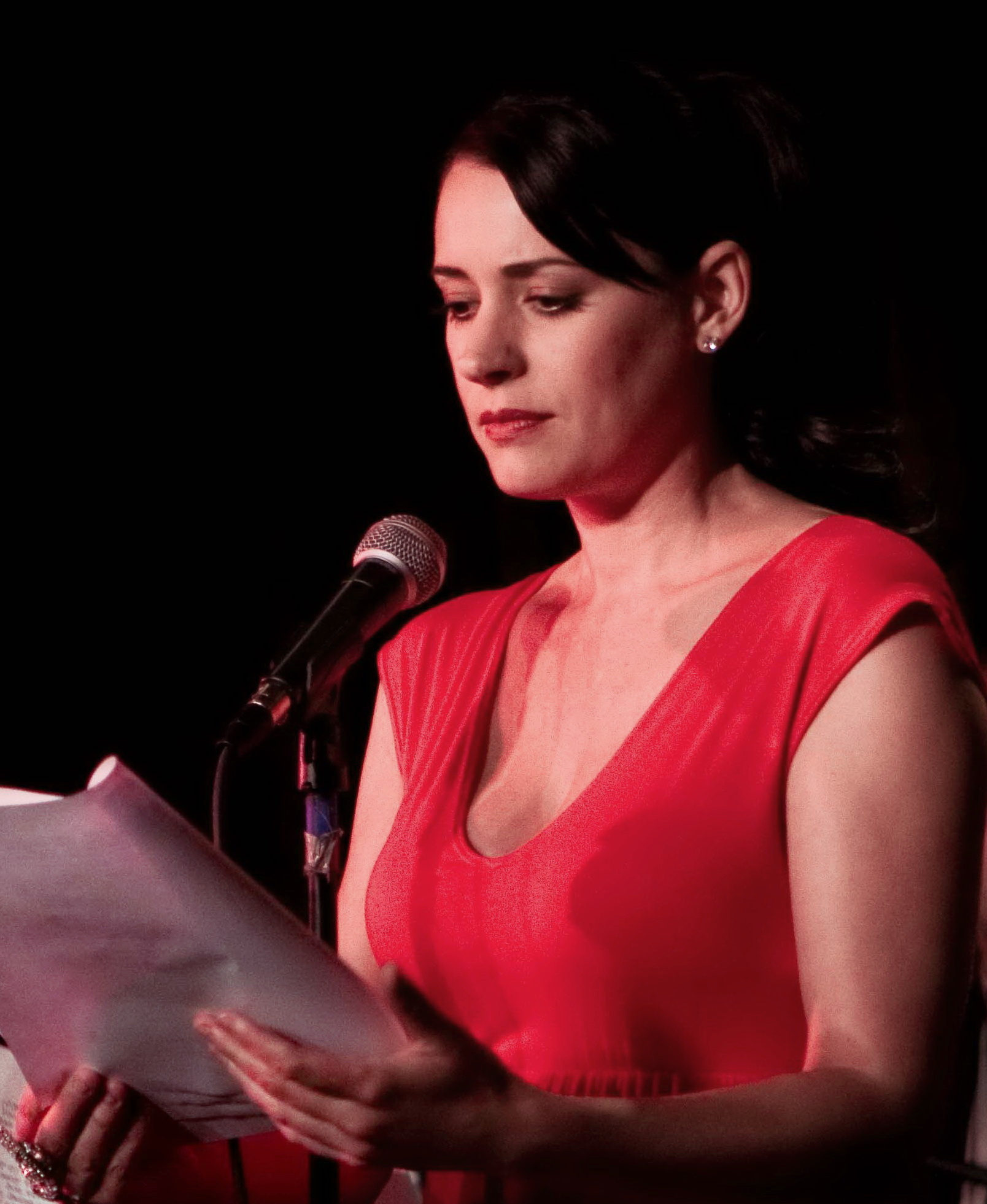
- Brewster in 2009
- Born: Paget Valerie Brewster; March 10, 1969 (age 57); Concord, Massachusetts, U.S.
- Occupations: Actress; singer
- Years active: 1990–present
- Known for: Emily Prentiss in Criminal Minds
- Spouse: Steve Damstra (m. 2014)

Paget Valerie Brewster (/ˈpædʒɪt/ PAJ-it; born March 10, 1969) is an American actress and singer. She first received recognition for her recurring role as Kathy on the fourth season of Friends. She gained wider recognition as FBI Supervisory Special Agent Emily Prentiss on CBS's Criminal Minds. Brewster was a recurring cast member of the NBC sitcom Community during its final season.

== Early life ==
Brewster was born in Concord, Massachusetts. Both her mother, Hathaway Brewster (née Tew), and father, Galen Brewster, worked as school administrators at Middlesex School. She is a descendant of William Brewster and wife Mary Brewster.

Brewster grew up in Massachusetts and moved to New York City to attend Parsons School of Design. In a later interview discussing this period, she said she very briefly worked as a receptionist in a bordello. During her first year at the design school, she made her acting debut and eventually dropped out to pursue her acting career. In the mid-1990s, Brewster moved to San Francisco and enrolled in acting classes.

== Career ==
In 1995, Brewster hosted a late-night talk show in the San Francisco Bay Area called The Paget Show for 65 episodes at KPIX-TV. She first came to prominent attention in her recurring role as Kathy in the fourth season of NBC's Friends. She appeared in Andy Richter Controls the Universe and Huff. On film she played Ms. Indestructible, the female lead in James Gunn's low-budget superhero comedy The Specials (2000). She played Amy Pierson, a calculus teacher afraid of the water, in the independent film The Big Bad Swim, which premiered at the 2006 Tribeca Film Festival.

In 2005, she began voice work as Judy Ken Sebben / Birdgirl, a recurring character on the animated series Harvey Birdman, Attorney at Law (and later played a similar guest character on American Dad!).

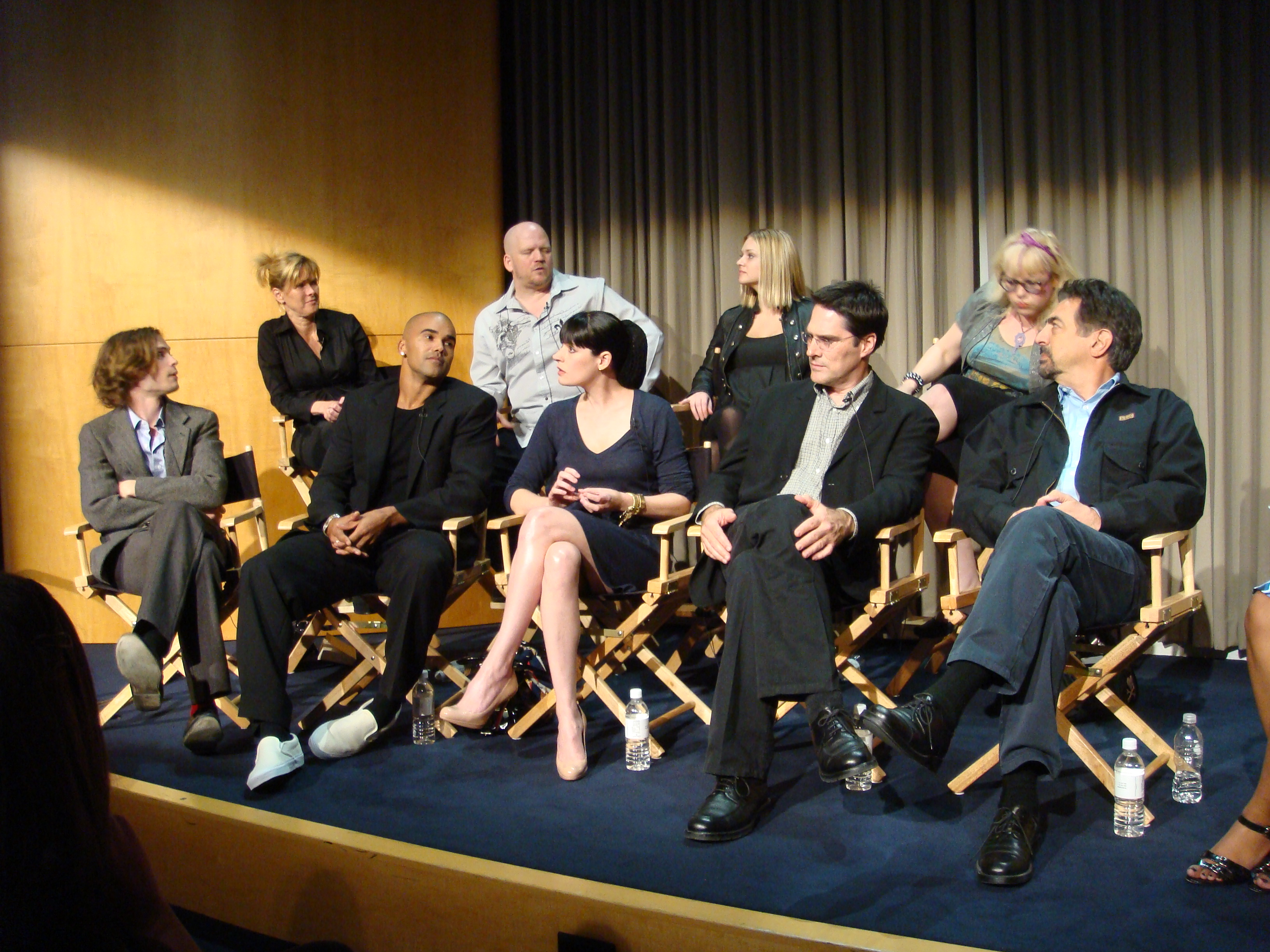
Brewster (front center) with the cast of Criminal Minds

Brewster had a long run with the show Criminal Minds, playing multilingual Supervisory Special Agent Emily Prentiss until the show's sixth season, when she and A. J. Cook were released from their contracts by CBS in a cost-cutting move. Owing to complaints from fans, both she and Cook were rehired and kept for the following season. In February 2012, Brewster announced via Deadline that she was leaving Criminal Minds at the end of the season to return to her comedic and sitcom roots. Brewster reprised her role as Emily Prentiss in season nine for the 200th episode, and season 11 as a special guest star. In 2016, Brewster returned to Criminal Minds once again as a series regular with Thomas Gibson's replacement.

Brewster portrayed bureau chief ADA Paula Foster in the Public Integrity Unit of the District Attorney's office in the 14th season (2012) of NBC's long-running police drama Law & Order: Special Victims Unit. Her character handled the case against SVU commanding officer Captain Donald Cragen (Dann Florek), suspected of murder after awakening next to a dead woman in the 13th-season finale.

Brewster was a regular on The Thrilling Adventure Hour, a staged production in the style of old-time radio that was recorded monthly at Largo in Los Angeles. She played the recurring character of Sadie Doyle, the alcoholic socialite who can communicate with the supernatural alongside her husband, Frank (Paul F. Tompkins), in the "Beyond Belief" segments. In early April 2013, Brewster appeared in Modern Family as Trish in episode 20, "Flip Flop", playing an art expert who is dating Gloria's ex-husband, Javier. In August 2013, Brewster appeared in episode 106 of the Drunk History television series on Comedy Central. In January 2015, Brewster began appearing on Community. In February 2014, it was announced that she had been cast in a new ABC comedy called St. Francis. In August 2016, it was announced that she would be reprising her role as Emily Prentiss on Criminal Minds and would once again be a series regular after co-star Thomas Gibson was fired by CBS over an on-set altercation. Brewster also regularly appears on Will You Accept This Rose, a podcast hosted by Arden Myrin about The Bachelor franchise.

== Personal life ==
On the March 30, 2006, episode of Late Night with Conan O'Brien, Brewster revealed that she had received a handwritten note indicating Hugh Hefner would like her to pose for Playboy. She seriously considered the offer, but even though she said that she admired Playboy more than magazines such as Maxim and FHM, and her parents gave her their blessing, she eventually turned it down.

Brewster has volunteered as an actress with the Los Angeles Young Storytellers Program.

On March 17, 2013, Brewster became engaged to composer Steve Damstra, a member of the bands Folded Light, and Whirlwind Heat. Brewster and Damstra married on November 28, 2014, in Los Angeles, in a ceremony officiated by Matthew Gray Gubler, their close friend and Brewster's Criminal Minds co-star. As of 2016, the couple lived in Los Angeles.

== Filmography ==
=== Film ===
Year	Title	Role	Notes
1998	Let's Talk About Sex	Michelle	
1999	Desperate But Not Serious	Frances	
2000	The Adventures of Rocky and Bullwinkle	Jenny Spy	
2000	The Specials	Emily Tilderbrook / Ms. Indestructible	
2001	Agent 15	Agent 15	Short film
2001	Hollywood Palms	Phoebe	
2001	Skippy	Julie Fontaine	
2002	Now You Know	Lea	
2003	Brainwarp	Lipstikk	Short film
2004	Eulogy	Aunt Lily	
2005	Man of the House	Coach 'Binky' Beauregard	
2005	My Big Fat Independent Movie	Julianne	
2006	Cyxork 7	Bethany Feral	
2006	The Big Bad Swim	Amy Pierson	
2006	Kidney Thieves	Melinda	Short film
2006	Unaccompanied Minors	Valerie Davenport	
2007	Sublime	Andrea	Direct-to-video
2012	Batman: The Dark Knight Returns	Lana Lang	Voice
2014	Gumshoe	Stiletto	Voice, short film
2015	Justice League: Gods and Monsters	Lois Lane	Voice
2015	Uncle Nick	Sophie	
2015	Welcome to Happiness	Priscilla	
2017	Axis	Dr. Lynch	Voice
2017	Batman and Harley Quinn	Poison Ivy	Voice, direct-to-video
2018	The Witch Files	Detective Strauss	Also producer
2022	Hypochondriac	Dr. Sampson	
2025	Touch Me		

=== Television ===
Year	Title	Role	Notes
1997–1998	Friends	Kathy	6 episodes, guest role (Season 4)
1998	Ghost Cop	Anette	Episode: "Pilot"
1998	Max Q	Rena Winter	Television film
1998–2001	Godzilla: The Series	Audrey Timmonds	Voice, 11 episodes
1999	The Expert	Dr. Jo Hardy	Episode: "Pilot"
1999–2000	Love & Money	Allison Conklin	Season 1 (13 episodes)
2000	Star Patrol	Rachel Striker	Pilot
2000	One True Love	Tina	Television film
2000–2001	The Trouble With Normal	Claire Garletti	Season 1 (13 episodes)
2001	DAG	Patti Donovan	Episode: "Prom"
2001	Raising Dad	Gracie	Episode: "Sex Ed"
2002	George Lopez	Ginger	Episode: "The Wedding Dance"
2002–2003	Andy Richter Controls the Universe	Jessica Green	Seasons 1–2 (19 episodes)
2003	The Snobs		Pilot
2003	Time Belt	Col. Jocelyn Anchor	Episode: "Oh. shirt. Zombies."
2004	Rock Me, Baby	Debbie	Episode: "Look Who's Talking"
2004–2006	Huff	Beth Huffstodt	Seasons 1–2 (25 episodes)
2005	Two and a Half Men	Jamie Eckleberry	Episode: "A Lungful of Alan"
2005	Duck Dodgers	Rona Vipra	Voice, 2 episodes
2005	Amber Frey: Witness for the Prosecution	Carol Carter	Television film
2005–2007	Harvey Birdman, Attorney at Law	Judy Ken Sebben / Birdgirl	Voice, 9 episodes
2005–2024	American Dad!	Various voices	Seasons 1–6, 8, 10, 12, 14–16, 18–19 (32 episodes)
2005–2006	Stacked	Charlotte	3 episodes
2006	Drawn Together	Child Services	Voice, episode: "Captain Girl"
2006	A Perfect Day	Allyson Harlan	Television film
2006–present	Criminal Minds	Emily Prentiss	204 episodes Main role (seasons 2–7, 12–present); Guest role (season 9, 11)
2007–2012	Law & Order: Special Victims Unit	Sheila Tierney	1 episode
2007–2012	Law & Order: Special Victims Unit	ADA Paula Foster	2 episodes
2008	Lost Behind Bars	Lauren Wilde	Television film
2009	King of the Hill	Myrna	Voice, episode: "Lucky See, Monkey Do"
2011–2013	Dan Vs.	Elise / Various voices	Voice, main role; Seasons 1–3 (53 episodes)
2011	My Life As an Experiment	Stacie Wilder	Pilot
2013	Modern Family	Trish	Episode: "Flip Flop"
2013	Spy	Erica	Pilot
2013	The Birthday Boys	Keri	Episode: "Going All the Way"
2013–2015	The Venture Bros.	Amber Gold / Various voices	Voice, 3 episodes
2013–2019	Drunk History	Herself / Emma Folsom	8 episodes
2014	Community	Debra Chambers	Season 5 (1 episode)
2014	The Boondocks	Various voices	Episode: "The New Black"
2014	Saint Francis	Stephanie Quinlan	Pilot
2014	Key & Peele	Det. Sally Ferguson	Episode: "Sex Detective"
2014–2016	Adventure Time	Viola, Pat	Voice, 2 episodes
2015	Down Dog	Amanda Asher	Pilot
2015	Kroll Show	Bobby's Mom	Episode: "The In Addition Tos"
2015	Community	Francesca "Frankie" Dart	Season 6 (13 episodes)
2015	Moonbeam City	Charisma Miller, Sophistica Miller	Voice, episode: "Lasers & Liars"
2015	W/ Bob & David	Charlene Boyeur	Episode: "Episode 1"
2015	Justice League: Gods and Monsters Chronicles	Lois Lane	Voice, episode: "Bomb"
2015–2018	Another Period	Dodo Bellacourt	Seasons 1–3 (22 episodes)
2015–2016	Grandfathered	Sara Kingsley	Season 1 (22 episodes)
2016–2023	Family Guy	Gretchen Mercer, others	Voice, 5 episodes
2016	Future-Worm!	Mrs. Claus	Voice, episode: "Lost in the Mall"
2017	Criminal Minds: Beyond Borders	Emily Prentiss	Episode: "Type A"
2018	Mighty Magiswords	Veronica Victorious	Voice, episode: "Mall of Shame"
2018–2021	DuckTales	Della Duck	Voice, main cast Nominated—Daytime Emmy Award for Outstanding Performer in an Animated Program
2019	Mom	Veronica Stone	Season 7 (3 episodes)
2019–2020	BoJack Horseman	Paige Sinclair	Voice, 4 episodes
2020	Magical Girl Friendship Squad	Gloriana	Voice, episode: "The Real World"
2020	Hollywood	Tallulah Bankhead	2 episodes
2021–2022	Birdgirl	Judy Ken Sebben / Birdgirl	Voice, main role
2021–2026	Behind the Attraction	Narrator	Voice, 18 episodes
2022–2023	How I Met Your Father	Lori	4 episodes
2022	Tuca & Bertie		Voice, episode: "Leaf Raking"
2022	The Great North	Ms. Anderson	Voice, episode: "Arranger-ous Minds Adventure"
2024	Twilight of the Gods	Jarnglumra	Voice, episode: "The Bride-Price"
2025	Krapopolis	Chira	Voice, 2 episodes
2025	The Simpsons	FBI Profiler	Voice, episode: "The Day of the Jack-up"
2025	Big City Greens	Spider Fang	Voice, 2 episodes
2026	Rock, Paper, Scissors	Veronica Web	Voice, episode: "Spider Court"
2026	Rick and Morty	Rachel	Voice, episode: "Erickerhead"

=== Video games ===
Year	Title	Role	Notes
2008	Harvey Birdman: Attorney at Law	Judy Ken Sebben / Birdgirl	

=== Web ===
Year	Title	Role	Notes
2021	Alpha Betas	Allison / Emily	Voice, episode: "This Is Alpha Team"

== Discography ==
=== Albums ===
Year	Artist	Album	Label	Format	Notes
1992	Mechanical Bride	Swamp Thing!	Lungcast Records	7", Ltd, White Vinyl	Lead singer
1993	Roger Manning	Roger Manning	Shimmy-Disc	CD, Cassette, Album, Stereo	Harmony vocals

=== Singles ===
Year	Artist	Song	Label	Format	Notes
1991	The Sleeping Pills	"Aquarius"	Hangman Records	CD, Single	Credited as Fabu
2020	Paget Brewster	"Drove to the Ocean"	Self-released	Digital	Brewster and Steve Damstra co-wrote the song
