= Curriculum Unavailable =

- Community episode
- Episode no.: Season 3 Episode 19
- Directed by: Adam Davidson
- Written by: Adam Countee
- Production code: 319
- Original air date: May 10, 2012

Guest appearances
- John Hodgman as Dr. Heidi; Richard Erdman as Leonard; Craig Cackowski as Officer Cackowski; Erik Charles Nielsen as Garrett Lambert; David St. James as Professor Albrecht; Danielle Kaplowitz as Vicki; Dan Harmon as Garrett Lambert (voice; uncredited)

Episode chronology
| ← Previous "Course Listing Unavailable" | Next → "Digital Estate Planning" |
- Community season 3

"Curriculum Unavailable" is the 19th episode of the third season of the American comedy television series Community and the 68th episode overall. It was written by Adam Countee and directed by Adam Davidson. It originally aired in the United States on May 10, 2012 on NBC.

In the episode, Abed attends a therapy session with the rest of the group after he insists that something is wrong at Greendale. As they explain some of Abed's past behaviors, they remember their experiences at the school and also realize that something is wrong there. However, the psychiatrist, Dr. Heidi, insists that nothing is wrong at Greendale and encourages the group to move past their time there.

The episode's format is similar to season 2's "Paradigms of Human Memory", parodying the format of clip shows by creating sequences of flashbacks using entirely new footage. In its original broadcast, the episode was seen by 2.99 million viewers. The episode received positive reviews from critics, though many felt it was inferior to "Paradigms of Human Memory".

== Plot ==
Two months after being expelled, (Note: As seen in "Course Listing Unavailable".) Abed (Danny Pudi) is caught trespassing on Greendale's campus; he insists the dean has been replaced by an imposter. To avoid charges, the group agrees to take Abed to a psychiatrist, Dr. Heidi (John Hodgman).

In Abed's therapy session, the others tell Dr. Heidi about past instances of Abed's unusual behavior, and Dr. Heidi says that Abed needs serious help. The group leaps to Abed's defense, arguing that if he is crazy, then all of them are crazy. They recount instances of their own unusual behavior. Unswayed, Dr. Heidi proposes for Abed to be institutionalized.

The group argues that Greendale is a crazy place and that Abed's obsession with the school is a natural result of that. Dr. Heidi encourages them to stop dwelling on Greendale for their own sakes, but the group counters by recalling good memories of the school. From their memories, they realize that the real dean (Jim Rash) would never have expelled them and decide to figure out what happened. They try to leave, but Dr. Heidi reveals they cannot return to the school. He explains that Greendale is actually an asylum, and they have finally been released but are now relapsing. Their memories of the school were a shared delusion created to cope with reality. The group pictures themselves in the asylum and accepts Dr. Heidi's story.

However, as they leave in shock, they realize Dr. Heidi's story is a complete lie. They return and confront him before he can escape. He reveals that Chang (Ken Jeong) hired him to keep them away from the school. This causes the group to remember Chang's previous behavior, allowing Dr. Heidi to escape. The group agrees to find the Dean and take down Chang. Elsewhere, Chang learns of the group's discovery and begins planning to stop them.

== Production ==
The episode was written by Adam Countee and directed by Adam Davidson. It is Countee's fourth writing credit and Davidson's sixth directing credit for the show.

The episode is a clip show, similar to "Paradigms of Human Memory". At least twenty-five unique scenes were incorporated into the montages. The episode also includes references to other episodes; Tim Surette of TV.com counted references to "'Paradigms of Human Memory' [...] and the trampoline episode, and the paintball episodes, and Annie kissing Abed, and the Christmas episode". The "twist" that the study group was actually in an asylum was compared to Shutter Island by several critics.

John Hodgman makes his sole appearance on the show as Dr. Heidi in this episode. Series creator Dan Harmon has a cameo in the episode as the voice of Garrett as a doctor.

On the day of the episode's original airing, the show was renewed for a fourth season of 13 episodes.

== Reception ==
=== Ratings ===
In its original broadcast, "Curriculum Unavailable" was seen by 2.99 million American viewers and achieved a 1.4 rating in the 18-49 demographic. This placed the show fourth in total viewership and third in the 18-49 demographic in its time slot and marked a slight decrease in overall viewership from the previous week's episode.

=== Reviews ===
The episode received positive reviews from critics. Robert Canning of IGN gave it a 8.5/10 rating, denoting a "great" episode. He enjoyed the humor from the clip-show portions of the episode, particularly during self-referential scenes, and also enjoyed the scenes when the group imagines themselves in an asylum. However, he thought the episode did not fit well within the show's ongoing multi-episode arc. Alan Sepinwall of Uproxx felt that the episode lacked the audacity of "Paradigms of Human Memory", as well as the miniature stories threaded into the original's flashbacks, but he thought it was still successful and included many funny ideas or scenes.

Emily VanDerWerff of The A.V. Club was more enthusiastic about the episode, giving it an A grade and remarking that it was better than "Paradigms of Human Memory". She felt that the story worked well because each montage of clips served to advance the plot. Sean Gandert of Paste gave the episode a 9.1 rating, noting that unlike the previous episode, the structure of the story was natural and well-suited for this episode. However, he still felt it was weaker than the first attempt at the format.

Writing for Screen Rant Ben Protheroe felt that the "It was all a dream" plot twist worked and praised how the episode almost immediately revealed that it was a lie. Den of Geek also included the episode in its list of the show's best episodes.
