= Course Listing Unavailable =

- Community episode
- Episode no.: Season 3 Episode 18
- Directed by: Tristram Shapeero
- Written by: Tim Saccardo
- Production code: 318
- Original air date: May 3, 2012

Guest appearances
- J.P. Manoux as Faux-by; Dino Stamatopoulos as Star-Burns; Richard Erdman as Leonard; Erik Charles Nielsen as Garrett Lambert; Danielle Kaplowitz as Vicki; Jeremy Scott Johnson as Carl; Brady Novak as Richie

Episode chronology
← Previous "Basic Lupine Urology"	Next → "Curriculum Unavailable"
- Community season 3

"Course Listing Unavailable" is the 18th episode of the third season of the American comedy television series Community and the 67th episode overall. It was written by Tim Saccardo and directed by Tristram Shapeero. It originally aired in the United States on May 3, 2012, on NBC.

In the episode, Greendale hosts a memorial service in the wake of Star-Burns's death, but anger against the school leads to a full-blown riot. Chang uses the opportunity to take control of the school and expel the seven study group members. The episode was seen by 3.20 million viewers and received mixed to positive reviews.

== Plot ==
The study group struggles to process the news of Star-Burns's death. (Note: As seen in "Basic Lupine Urology".) Jeff (Joel McHale) encourages everyone to simply move on, but Britta (Gillian Jacobs) tries to open a discussion about everyone's feelings, with little success. Chang (Ken Jeong) asks Dean Pelton (Jim Rash) for expanded policing powers at Greendale, which are rejected. The dean then leaves to tell the study group that Professor Kane has resigned over Star-Burns's death, forcing them to make up biology over the summer. Jeff, overwhelmed with despair, breaks down in tears over the news.

The group attends a memorial service for Star-Burns in the cafeteria. Jeff, still angry about having to retake biology, offers to give a eulogy but uses his time to rant against the school. Annie (Alison Brie) and Shirley (Yvette Nicole Brown) also decry the school for failing them, and the crowd becomes fired up and angry. Panicking, the dean agrees to Chang's earlier requests, and Chang gathers his loyal security forces. (Note: As seen in "Contemporary Impressionists".) When Pierce's (Chevy Chase) speech provokes a full-blown riot, the security team viciously attacks with riot gear and pepper spray.

Afterwards, the group faces discipline from the school board. Pierce suggests pinning the blame on Chang, and the dean decides to replace him. When Chang learns about this, he has the dean kidnapped and replaced by an impersonator (J. P. Manoux). At the school board meeting, Jeff defends the group's actions and blames Chang, but Chang arrives and charms the board. An appearance by the "dean" seals the decision, and the study group is expelled.

At Troy (Donald Glover), Abed (Danny Pudi), and Annie's apartment, the group wallows in depression. Britta regrets trying to help the group, and Abed wonders if this is the real Darkest Timeline. (Note: As seen in "Remedial Chaos Theory".) However, Troy insists they'll be fine because they're still together. This lifts everyone's spirits, and they share pizza together.

== Reception ==
=== Ratings ===
In its original broadcast, "Course Listing Unavailable" was seen by 3.20 million American viewers and achieved a 1.4 rating in the 18-49 demographic. This placed the show fourth in total viewership and third in the 18-49 demographic in its time slot and kept the show roughly even with the previous week's ratings.

=== Reviews ===
The episode received mixed to positive reviews from critics, with many noting that while individual elements worked, it struggled to bring everything together. Sean Gandert of Paste gave the episode a 7.1, remarking that while many of the individual scenes were entertaining, the overall story felt "unstructured and messy". He criticized the episode for prioritizing the events of Chang's plotline over the main characters and their actions. Emily VanDerWerff of The A.V. Club gave the episode a B− and also thought that while the individual elements generally worked and were amusing, it struggled as a whole and was poorly paced. However, she likened it to "a serialized drama's 'moving the pieces around on the board' episode" and noted that the episode might work better in retrospect once the season ended. Robert Canning of IGN gave the episode a 7.5, denoting a "good" episode, and appreciated its role as a transition episode and as the culmination of what Chang had been working toward during the season. He enjoyed seeing Troy taking the lead at the end but still felt that the episode, including the ending, did not flow well overall.

Bill Wyman of Slate was more positive in his review, remarking that the episode did a good job of saying farewell to Star-Burns and allowing Chang to "come at long last into his own". Alan Sepinwall of Uproxx felt that the middle part of the episode — the riot and the group's subsequent expulsion — was weak and contrived, but he enjoyed the balance between humor and the darkness of Star-Burns's death and lauded the final scene, which he likened to a bonus scene from "Remedial Chaos Theory". Joshua Kurp of Vulture found the connections between plot points to be fairly thin, but he did find it funny enough to be a success overall. He also thought the episode nailed the third act and set up interesting future plotlines.
