= Urban Matrimony and the Sandwich Arts =

- Community episode
- Episode no.: Season 3 Episode 11
- Directed by: Kyle Newacheck
- Written by: Vera Santamaria
- Production code: 312
- Original air date: March 15, 2012

Guest appearances
- Malcolm-Jamal Warner as Andre Bennett; Richard Erdman as Leonard; Kwesi Boakye as Elijah Bennett; Crystal the Monkey as Annie's Boobs; Tyrel Jackson Williams as Jordan Bennett

Episode chronology
← Previous "Regional Holiday Music"	Next → "Contemporary Impressionists"
- Community season 3

"Urban Matrimony and the Sandwich Arts" is the eleventh episode of the third season and 60th overall episode of the American television series Community. It originally aired on March 15, 2012, on NBC, with the series returning after a three-month hiatus. In the episode, Shirley's ex-husband Andre whom she has reconciled with proposes to her again. While planning her wedding, she also considers a business proposition from Pierce. The rest of the study group help Shirley plan the wedding, while Troy and Abed attempt to suppress their weirdness and act normal at the rehearsal to no avail.

The episode was written by Vera Santamaria and directed by Kyle Newacheck. It received generally positive reviews, with critics praising its strong character development. Critics also noted how the Troy/Abed storyline provided the overall theme of normality for the episode. The episode's broadcast delivered a 46% increase in viewers from the previous episode in the key 18–49 demographic.

It also creates a small continuity error as a thread of the Troy and Abed story from Impressionists continues in this episode.

== Plot ==
The coffee shop at the Greendale cafeteria is still shuttered after being burnt down the previous semester. While the group are having lunch at the cafeteria, Pierce (Chevy Chase) informs them that he is looking for a business venture to invest his wealth in. Britta (Gillian Jacobs) suggests he invest in Shirley's (Yvette Nicole Brown) proposal to start a sandwich shop at the cafeteria. Suddenly, Andre (Malcolm-Jamal Warner) bursts in and proposes to Shirley (for the second time), and she accepts.

Back at the study room with Shirley absent, Jeff (Joel McHale) and Britta rail against the institution of marriage. When Shirley arrives, she informs the group that the wedding rehearsal will be held in two days in the study room itself. She asks Jeff to give a toast at the wedding. The group offers to help her plan the wedding, while Pierce asks her to join him in pitching her sandwich shop proposal to Dean Pelton. She declines everyone's offers and leaves to focus on her wedding plans.

Troy (Donald Glover) and Abed (Danny Pudi) are determined not to embarrass Shirley at her wedding by being weird. They decide to purge their weirdness during a 24-hour "weirddown" at the Dreamatorium. Britta adamantly tells Shirley to go ahead with her plans to start a sandwich shop and offers to plan the wedding with Annie's (Alison Brie) help. Shirley reluctantly agrees but is unimpressed by Pierce's initial plans. As she is about to walk out on him, Pierce reveals that he has been fired by Hawthorne Wipes and begs Shirley to give him a chance at entrepreneurship. They then make the pitch to Dean Pelton (Jim Rash).

Britta reveals a natural talent at wedding planning but is depressed at the thought of succumbing to marriage one day. Jeff is unable to write a good wedding toast because he is emotionally scarred by his father leaving his family. Troy and Abed arrive at the rehearsal in grey suits acting "normal". Shirley arrives late due to her pitch, leading to an argument with Andre, who intends to be the family's sole breadwinner. Jeff and Britta have a drunken exchange at the altar and almost end up getting married. Shirley and Andre move in to stop them, which leads to an open conversation with each other. Andre finally accepts that Shirley has changed, and the wedding is back on track. Instead of waiting another day, they marry on the spot.

After seeing his former pet monkey Annie's Boobs in the vent, Troy convinces Abed that they should stop pretending to be normal and embrace their weirdness. Dean Pelton informs Shirley that the Greendale Board has sold the cafeteria space to Subway and expresses his hurt at not being invited to the wedding. Annie offers Shirley words of encouragement, but Shirley is more worried about Pierce's reaction. The scene then cuts to Pierce in a drunken rage at his dad's grave, toasting his unknowingly unsuccessful sales pitch.

== Production ==
"Urban Matrimony and the Sandwich Arts" was written by Vera Santamaria, her first writing credit for the series. It was directed by Kyle Newacheck, his first directing credit. Series regular Ken Jeong does not appear in this episode. Malcolm-Jamal Warner guest-starred as Andre, Shirley's husband.

== Cultural references ==
When Pierce walks in with his hair slicked and dressed in suspenders, Troy asks him why he "looks like a wealthy murderer." This is a nod to American Psycho's titular character, Patrick Bateman, whose attire bears similarities to Pierce's.

Andre's proposal to Shirley where he sings and dances with a troupe is a reference to R&B group Boyz II Men. In his proposal he says, "I have loved you since there was a Soviet Union and only one Damon Wayans."

When Jeff suggests using a Webster's Dictionary definition to start his wedding toast, Annie calls it the "Jim Belushi of openings: it accomplishes nothing, but everyone keeps on using it, and no one knows why."

The announcement of Subway opening in the Greendale cafeteria by Dean Pelton is a reference to Chuck, another series which previously aired on NBC. The Subway franchise struck an advertising partnership with Chuck to keep the series on the air from 2010.

Among the images of subjects shown to be in Jeff's "heart" are a suburban home, Alicia Witt, a royal flush, Annie, Annie's boobs (both multiple times), a glass of Scotch whiskey, a dog, a BlackBerry phone, and a yellow TVR Griffith.

== Reception ==
=== Ratings ===
In its original American broadcast on March 15, 2012, "Urban Matrimony and the Sandwich Arts" was viewed by approximately 4.9 million people, with a season-high Nielsen rating/share of 2.2/7 in the adults 18–49 demographic, a 46% increase from the previous episode which aired on December 8, 2011. It finished second in its 8 pm time slot among broadcast networks in the key demographic after Fox reality show American Idol but outperformed Idol in the adults 18–34 category.

=== Critical reviews ===
The episode received generally positive reviews from critics, many of whom noting the "normal" theme of the episode portrayed in the Troy/Abed storyline.

Emily VanDerWerff of The A.V. Club remarked that "Urban Matrimony and the Sandwich Arts" was "normal" without the series' usual inside jokes, pop culture references or stylistic departures, which she felt was a good way to win over new fans given the show's poor ratings. She gave the episode an 'A−' grade, praising the show's strong use of its characters. Matt Richenthal of TV Fanatic said the episode "delivered a hilarious half hour, while proving the wacky show can actually act quite normal and showcase characters that are more fully developed than any other sitcom on television."

HitFix's Alan Sepinwall said the episode was a "splendid return". He also noted that the Troy/Abed subplot provided meta-commentary on the limitations of normality for the show and how sometimes "it's just more fun when you go crazy and follow the monkey into the vent." Robert Canning of IGN gave the episode an 8/10 rating, saying it "proved that Community is a solid, funny, entertaining half hour of television" despite being a relatively grounded entry.

Michael Arbeiter of Hollywood.com said while the episode "is not likely to be in your Top 10 of the series’ best, it is an adept welcome back for the show we’ve missed and worried about since its hiatus was instituted."

=== Twitter ===
During its original airing on March 15, 2012, four Community-related topics were trending worldwide on Twitter: "InspectorSpacetime," "Troy and Abed," "Annie's Boobs," and "Jim Belushi".
