= Digital Exploration of Interior Design =

- Community episode
- Episode no.: Season 3 Episode 13
- Directed by: Dan Eckman
- Written by: Chris McKenna
- Production code: 313
- Original air date: March 29, 2012

Guest appearances
- John Goodman as Vice Dean Laybourne; Travis Schuldt as Rick/"Subway"; Richard Erdman as Leonard; James M. Connor as Subway Rep; Dan Bakkedahl as Murray; Dino Stamatopoulos as Star-Burns; Luke Youngblood as Magnitude; Erik Charles Nielsen as Garrett; Adam Silver as Guy / Kim

Episode chronology
← Previous "Contemporary Impressionists"	Next → "Pillows and Blankets"
- Community season 3

"Digital Exploration of Interior Design" is the thirteenth episode of the third season of the American television series Community. It originally aired on March 29, 2012, on NBC. The episode was written by Chris McKenna and directed by Dan Eckman. While the inclusion of Subway in the show is a paid product placement, Dan Eckman noted they were given complete freedom of how to include the brand in the story.

== Plot ==
Subway opens a store at Greendale, stealing Shirley's (Yvette Nicole Brown) idea for a sandwich shop. Because all on-campus businesses must be majority-owned by students, the company introduces a "corpo-humanoid", also named Subway (Travis Schuldt), to represent them as a person. Shirley and Pierce (Chevy Chase) ask Britta (Gillian Jacobs) to get close to Subway and find dirt on him; she resists their requests.

Jeff (Joel McHale) finds out he has a locker he has never used. Inside, he finds an angry note from "Kim". Troy (Donald Glover) and Abed (Danny Pudi) build a pillow fort together and learn they could set a Guinness World Record for largest pillow or blanket fort. Troy suggests adding blankets to set the record, but Abed refuses to shift his approach just to receive recognition. Seeking to pry Troy away from the group, Vice Dean Laybourne (John Goodman) manipulates Troy's feelings of inferiority to make him turn on Abed.

Jeff and Annie (Alison Brie) try to find Kim so Jeff can apologize, but another student (Adam Silver) informs them that Kim recently died. Jeff despairs upon learning this; Annie suggests apologizing to Kim's locker. Meanwhile, Britta and Subway bond over their appreciation for Nineteen Eighty-Four. Pierce suspects Britta is falling for Subway. He gives her a pen to plant as a bug, as well as lipstick for herself. Britta finds Subway in Abed's fort and snaps the pen, refusing to be a spy. They kiss, unaware that the lipstick is the actual bug.

At Kim's locker, Jeff apologizes for whatever he did wrong. The student from earlier reveals he is actually Kim; he was irritated with Jeff for constantly forgetting him during Jeff's first year. Annie, who thought she was teaching Jeff about his poor treatment of women, becomes furious. After meeting with Troy, Abed agrees to destroy his pillow fort, but Laybourne urges Abed to not sacrifice his work. When Britta's activities with Subway are revealed, Subway is taken away and replaced by another corpo-humanoid. Annie eventually apologizes to Jeff for snapping, though Jeff has forgotten about Kim again.

In the study room, Abed and Troy confront each other with their followers. Dean Pelton (Jim Rash) attempts to defuse the situation, but Star-Burns (Dino Stamatopoulos) accidentally throws a pillow into Troy's blanket fort, creating chaos. Each side retreats into its fort; Troy and Abed share one last look before retreating.

== Production ==
The episode was written by Chris McKenna, his seventh writing credit for the show. It was directed by Dan Eckman, his first and only directing credit for the show.

The episode continues the sandwich shop plot from previous episodes and reintroduces the blanket forts first seen in season 2's "Conspiracy Theories and Interior Design". The conflict introduced between Troy and Abed is continued in the following episode, "Pillows and Blankets".

Dan Harmon explained in the DVD Commentary for this episode that the title, "Digital Exploration of Interior Design" is an innuendo, in reference to the sexual acts Britta performs on the character Subway.

In an interview with KCRW, creator Dan Harmon revealed that Kim was named after Sony Pictures Television executive Kim Rozenfeld, who used to provide notes for the show that the crew ignored.

== Reception ==
=== Ratings ===
In its original American broadcast on March 29, 2012, "Digital Exploration of Interior Design" was viewed by approximately 3.5 million people, with a Nielsen rating/share of 1.7/6 in the adults 18–49 demographic.

=== Critical reviews ===
The episode received generally mixed to positive reviews from critics.

Emily VanDerWerff of The A.V. Club remarked that "Digital Exploration Of Interior Design" is a "relentlessly entertaining episode, and it’s the first one in a while I can think of where all three subplots really have moments that pop" and rated it B+. Alan Sepinwall of Hitfix summarized it as "loved Britta/Subway, but the rest of it made this my least favorite post-hiatus episode." Robert Canning of IGN episode reviewed it positively and rated it 8.5/10 and called it "great". Sean Gandert of Paste gave the episode an 8.9 out of 10, praising the episode's references to past episodes and for creating a strong school-based story without high-concept gimmicks.
