= Marc Andreyko =

American novelist

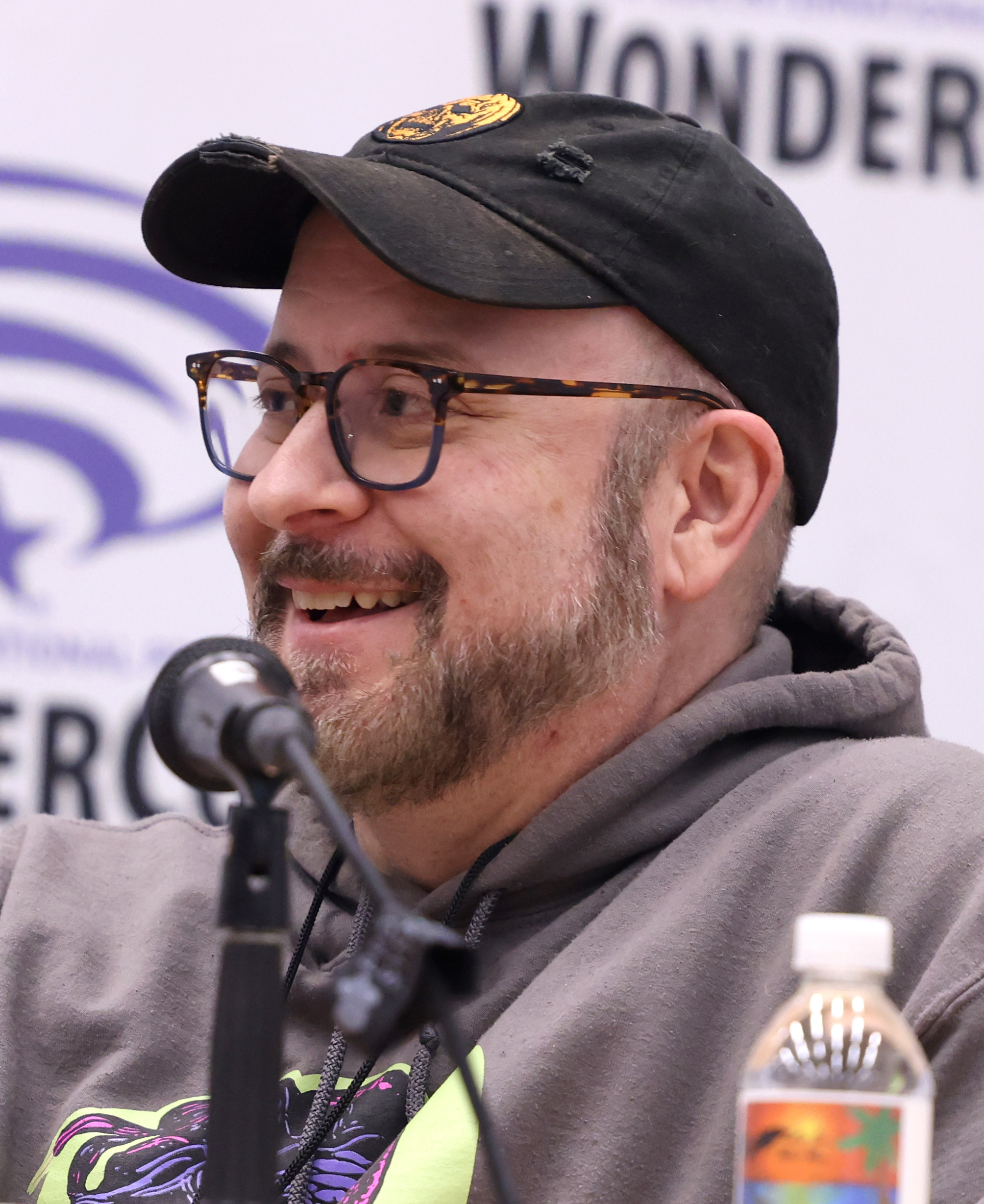
- Andreyko in 2025
- Born: 1970 (age 55–56)
- Area: Writer
- Notable works: Manhunter; Torso

Marc Andreyko (born 1970) is an American comic book writer and screenwriter, best known for the true crime series Torso he co-wrote with Brian Michael Bendis and for co-creating the character Kate Spencer for DC Comics.

== Career ==
Andreyko created the character Kate Spencer, who became the first female DC character to assume the identity of Manhunter.

Marc Andreyko co-wrote the limited series Torso with Brian Michael Bendis, for which he was nominated for the Angoulême International Comics Festival Prize Awarded by the Audience and the Prize for Scenario (script) in 2003. He and Bendis have worked with Paramount Pictures on a film adaptation of the work.

In 1991, Kent State University student Michael Mould began translating Ruggero Leoncavallo's opera Pagliacci into English for a comics adaptation, but died on USAir Flight 405 before he could complete it. Andreyko finished Mould's translation as The Clowns, a one-shot written by P. Craig Russell and illustrated by Galen Showman. Published in 1998 by Dark Horse Comics, The Clowns is dedicated in memory of Mould.

He co-created with Russell, an Eisner- and Harvey-winning one-shot for Marvel Comics featuring Dr. Strange entitled What Is It That Disturbs You, Stephen?

In 1996, he directed a production of Joe Orton's Loot for the Weathervane Theater in Akron.

In 1997 he co-created (with Jay Geldhof and Galen Showman) The Lost, a Harvey-nominated comics mini-series which continued the story of Peter Pan in modern times, with the protagonist presented as an amoral vampiric boy prostitute.

He has written comics for Dark Horse Comics, IDW Publishing, Todd McFarlane Productions, and Image Comics.

In 2004 he began writing DC Comics' Manhunter series, relaunching it with a third volume, in which he (with artist Jesus Saiz) introduced the character of Kate Spencer, the first woman to carry the long-running "Manhunter" legacy. He also created Spencer's civilian business partner Damon Matthews, who is in a romantic relationship with superhero Obsidian, one of the few gay-identified couples in mainstream superhero comics. The series ran for 38 issues, and Andreyko went on to write a Manhunter back-up feature in DC Comics' Batman: Streets of Gotham monthly series shortly afterward.

Later work includes The Ferryman for Wildstorm, created by Joel Silver, with artist Jonathan Wayshak. In 2010 he wrote Bruce Wayne: The Road Home: Oracle, a one-shot that tied into the Return of Bruce Wayne event. In 2011 he collaborated with artist Billy Tucci on a fill-in story for Birds of Prey, which featured his Manhunter character.

In September 2013, after the creative team of J.H. Williams III and W. Haden Blackman announced their departure from Batwoman, DC co-publisher Dan Didio announced Andreyko as the new writer of the series, starting with issue No. 25. He continued as writer until the series' end with issue No. 40.

In October 2014, Andreyko was announced as the writer of DC Comics series Wonder Woman '77, set in continuity with the Lynda Carter series.

Since 2016 Marc Andreyko has been a competitor on the Movie Trivia Schmoedown dubbed "The Android" and on May 31, 2019, Andreyko and his Tag Team Partner Jeff Sneider of the team known as "The Odd Couple" were crowned Tag Team Championship. He is also the first openly gay competitor to win the championship making it the first time in the show's history that a competitor from the LGBT Community has been crowned a Schmoedown Champion.

== Personal life ==
Andreyko lives in Los Angeles. He is openly gay.

== Bibliography ==
=== Early work ===
- Mara of the Celts (co-written by Andreyko and Dennis Cramer, art by Cramer, Eros):
  - Mara of the Celts Book Two #1 (1995)
  - Mara: Celtic Shamaness #1 (1995)
- The Lost (Caliber):
  - Calibrations #1: "Stage Fright" (with Jill Thompson, anthology, 1996)
  - Mister X vol. 3 #2: "The Lost" (with Jay Geldhof, co-feature — 6-page preview of the series, 1996)
  - The Lost #1–2 (script by Andreyko from a plot by Andreyko, Mark Scott Ricketts, Galen Showman and Jay Geldhof, art by Showman, 1996)
    - After the title was discontinued by Caliber, the creators took it to Chaos! Comics with the intention of publishing it as a long-running, ongoing series.
    - Chaos! reprinted the first two issues as The Lost #1–2 (1997–1998) and published only one issue of new material before the title was canceled once again:
      - The Lost #3 (script by Andreyko from a plot by Andreyko, Mark Scott Ricketts, Galen Showman and Jay Geldhof, art by Ricketts and Geldhof, 1998)
- Chaos! Comics:
  - Lady Death vs. Vampirella: Dark Hearts (co-written by Andreyko and Brian Pulido, art by Steven Hughes, one-shot, 1999)
  - Purgatori: Goddess Rising #1–4 (with Mike Deodato, Jr., 1999)
  - Purgatori vs. Vampirella (with Christian Zanier, one-shot, 2000)

=== Marvel Comics ===
- Doctor Strange: What is it that Disturbs You, Stephen? (with P. Craig Russell, graphic novel, 48 pages, 1997, ISBN 0-7851-0588-3)
- Shadows and Light #2: "The Date" (with Jill Thompson, anthology, 1998) collected in Spider-Man: Webspinners — The Complete Collection (tpb, 480 pages, 2018, ISBN 1-302-90681-X)
- Blade: Sins of the Father (with Bart Sears, one-shot, 1998) collected in Blade: Blood and Chaos (tpb, 312 pages, 2018, ISBN 1-302-91421-9)
- The Supernaturals #1–4 (script by Andreyko from a plot by Brian Pulido, art by Ivan Reis, 1998)
- Wolverine Annual '99: "Crying Wolf!" (with Walter A. McDaniel) and "Beer Run" (with Massimiliano Frezzato, 1999)
  - The first story is collected in Deadpool Classic Companion Volume 1 (tpb, 384 pages, 2015, ISBN 0-7851-9294-8)
  - Both stories are collected in Wolverine: Blood Debt (tpb, 488 pages, 2018, ISBN 1-302-91022-1)
- Wha... Huh? (with Jim Mahfood, among other writers, one-shot, 2005) collected in Secret Wars Too (tpb, 208 pages, 2016, ISBN 1-302-90211-3)
- Captain America and Bucky #620–624 (co-written by Andreyko and Ed Brubaker, art by Chris Samnee, 2011–2012)
  - Collected as Captain America and Bucky: The Life Story of Bucky Barnes (hc, 112 pages, 2012, ISBN 0-7851-5123-0; tpb, 2012, ISBN 0-7851-5124-9)
  - Collected in Captain America: Return of the Winter Soldier Omnibus (hc, 752 pages, 2015, ISBN 0-7851-9271-9)

=== Dark Horse Comics ===
- The Clowns (translated from Italian by Andreyko; adapted by P. Craig Russell, drawn by Galen Showman, one-shot, 1998)
- Predators Movie Prequel #1–4: "Welcome to the Jungle" (with Guilherme Balbi, co-feature, 2010) collected in Predators (tpb, 168 pages, 2010, ISBN 1-59582-628-9)
- Robert E. Howard's Savage Sword #1–2: "Storytelling" (with Robert Atkins, anthology, 2010–2011) collected in Robert E. Howard's Savage Sword Volume 1 (tpb, 144 pages, 2013, ISBN 1-61655-075-9)
- Let Me In: Crossroads #1–4 (with Patric Reynolds, 2010–2011) collected as Let Me In: Crossroads (tpb, 112 pages, 2011, ISBN 1-59582-796-X)
- Mulan: Revelations #1–4 (script by Andreyko based on the concept by Robert Alter, art by Micah Kaneshiro, 2015)

=== Image Comics ===
- Jinx: Torso #1–6 (co-written by Andreyko and Brian Michael Bendis, art by Bendis, 1998–1999)
  - Collected as Torso (tpb, 280 pages, 2001, ISBN 1-58240-174-8; hc, Icon, 2012, ISBN 0-7851-5356-X)
  - Collected in Brian Michael Bendis: Crime Noir Omnibus (hc, 1,152 pages, Icon, 2017, ISBN 1-302-90159-1)
- Case Files: Sam and Twitch (Todd McFarlane Productions):
  - "Have You Seen Me" (with Scott Morse, in #1–6, 2003)
  - "Skeletons" (with Paul Lee, in #7–12, 2004–2005)
  - "Ancient Chinese Secret, Huh?" (with E. J. Su, in #14–19, 2005)
  - "Fathers and Daughters" (with Greg Scott, in #20–25, 2005–2006)
- The Crazies #3: "Black Pond" (with Vincent Spencer, Top Cow, 2010)
- The Further Adventures of Nick Wilson #1–5 (co-written by Andreyko and Eddie Gorodetsky, art by Stephen Sadowski, 2018) collected as The Further Adventures of Nick Wilson (tpb, 152 pages, 2018, ISBN 1-5343-0679-X)
- Violator vol. 2 #1–6 (with Piotr Kowalski (#1), Kyle Hotz (#2), Jonathan Wayshak (#3), Gianenrico Bonacorsi (#4), Kevin Maguire + Ben Templesmith (#5) and Von Randal (#6), Todd McFarlane Productions, 2024–2025) collected as Violator (tpb, 312 pages, 2026, ISBN 1-5343-3231-6)

=== DC Comics ===
- Manhunter (Kate Spencer):
  - Manhunter vol. 3 (with Jesús Saiz, Javier Pina, Brad Walker (#13), Fernando Blanco and Michael Gaydos, 2004–2009) collected as:
    - Street Justice (collects #1–5, tpb, 128 pages, 2005, ISBN 1-4012-0728-6)
    - Trial by Fire (collects #6–14, tpb, 224 pages, 2007, ISBN 1-4012-1198-4)
    - Origins (collects #15–23, tpb, 224 pages, 2007, ISBN 1-4012-1340-5)
    - Unleashed (collects #24–30, tpb, 176 pages, 2008, ISBN 1-4012-1632-3)
    - Forgotten (collects #31–38, tpb, 192 pages, 2009, ISBN 1-4012-2158-0)
  - Batman: Streets of Gotham #1–13: "Manhunter" (with Georges Jeanty, Jeremy Haun, Cliff Richards (#7) and Szymon Kudranski (#12–13), co-feature, 2009–2010)
    - A collected edition was solicited for a 2010 release but subsequently cancelled: Manhunter: Face Off (tpb, 128 pages, ISBN 1-4012-2902-6)
  - Manhunters: The Secret History (with Renato Guedes, 5-issue limited series, cancelled in part due to the COVID-19 pandemic — initially announced for 2020)
- Superman Returns Prequel #2 (with Karl Kerschl) and #4 (with Wellington Diaz, 2006) collected in Superman Returns: The Prequels (tpb, 128 pages, 2006, ISBN 1-4012-1146-1)
- The Outsiders: Five of a Kind — Grace/Wonder Woman (with Cliff Richards, one-shot, 2007) collected in The Outsiders: Five of a Kind (tpb, 160 pages, 2008, ISBN 1-4012-1672-2)
- Nightwing Annual #2: "Hero's Journey" (with Joe Bennett, 2007) collected in Nightwing: The Lost Year (tpb, 160 pages, 2008, ISBN 1-4012-1671-4)
- Gotham City Sirens #8 (dialogue over plot and art by Guillem March, 2010) collected in Gotham City Sirens: Book One (tpb, 320 pages, 2014, ISBN 1-4012-5175-7)
- JSA 80-Page Giant 2010: "...the Not-So-Secret Origin of Obsidian!" (with Mike Norton, anthology one-shot, 2010)
- Bruce Wayne: The Road Home — Oracle (with Agustín Padilla, one-shot, 2010) collected in Batman: Bruce Wayne — The Road Home (hc, 200 pages, 2011, ISBN 0-85768-445-0; tpb, 2012, ISBN 1-4012-3347-3)
- Birds of Prey vol. 2 #14–15: "War and Remembrance" (with Billy Tucci and Adriana Melo, 2011) collected in Birds of Prey: The Death of Oracle (hc, 200 pages, 2011, ISBN 1-4012-3275-2; tpb, 2012, ISBN 1-4012-3449-6)
- DC Universe Presents #13–16: "Black Lightning/Blue Devil" (with Robson Rocha, anthology, 2012–2013) collected in DC Universe Presents: Black Lightning and Blue Devil (tpb, 160 pages, 2014, ISBN 1-4012-4277-4)
- Sword of Sorcery vol. 2 #4–7: "Stalker, the Man without a Soul" (with Andrei Bressan, co-feature, 2013) collected in Sword of Sorcery: Amethyst (tpb, 328 pages, 2013, ISBN 1-4012-4100-X)
- Batwoman (with Jeremy Haun, Georges Jeanty, Jason Masters (#29 and the Futures End one-shot), Scott Kolins (#33), Moritat (#34 and Annual #1) and Juan José Ryp (#38), 2014–2015) collected as:
  - Webs (collects #25–34 and Annual #1, tpb, 272 pages, 2014, ISBN 1-4012-5082-3)
  - The Unknowns (collects #35–40, Annual #2 and the Batwoman: Futures End one-shot, tpb, 208 pages, 2015, ISBN 1-4012-5468-3)
- Fairest #21–26: "Of Men and Mice" (with Shawn McManus, Vertigo, 2014) collected as Fairest: Of Men and Mice (tpb, 144 pages, 2014, ISBN 1-4012-5005-X)
- Wonder Woman '77 (digital):
  - Wonder Woman '77 #1–15 (with Drew Johnson, Matt Haley, Richard Ortiz, Jason Badower and Cat Staggs (#10–12), 2015–2016)
    - These installments were first published in print as a 4-issue limited series titled Wonder Woman '77 Special (2015–2016)
    - The Wonder Woman '77 Special series was subsequently reprinted in the following collected editions:
      - Volume 1 (collects #1–2, tpb, 168 pages, 2016, ISBN 1-4012-6328-3)
      - Volume 2 (collects #3–4, tpb, 168 pages, 2017, ISBN 1-4012-6788-2)
  - Batman '66 Meets Wonder Woman '77 #1–12 (co-written by Andreyko and Jeff Parker, art by David Hahn, 2016–2017)
    - The series was first published in print as a 6-issue limited series titled Batman '66 Meets Wonder Woman '77 (2017)
    - Collected as Batman '66 Meets Wonder Woman '77 (hc, 144 pages, 2017, ISBN 1-4012-7385-8; tpb, 2018, ISBN 1-4012-7803-5)
- Convergence: Batman and the Outsiders #1–2 (with Carlos D'Anda, 2015) collected in Convergence: Crisis Book One (tpb, 272 pages, 2015, ISBN 1-4012-5808-5)
- Death of Hawkman #1–6 (with Aaron Lopresti and Rodney Buchemi (#3–5), 2016–2017) collected as Death of Hawkman (tpb, 192 pages, 2017, ISBN 1-4012-6824-2)
- Adam Strange/Future Quest Special (co-written by Andreyko and Jeff Parker, art by Steve Lieber, Hanna-Barbera Beyond, 2017) collected in DC Meets Hanna-Barbera Volume 1 (tpb, 168 pages, 2017, ISBN 1-4012-7604-0)
- Harley & Ivy Meet Betty & Veronica #1–6 (co-written by Andreyko and Paul Dini, art by Laura Braga, 2017–2018) collected as Harley & Ivy Meet Betty & Veronica (hc, 160 pages, 2018, ISBN 1-4012-8033-1; tpb, 2019, ISBN 1-4012-9275-5)
- Supergirl vol. 6 (with Kevin Maguire, Evan Shaner (#24), Emanuela Lupacchino (#25) and Eduardo Pansica, 2018–2020) collected as:
  - The Killers of Krypton (collects #21–26, tpb, 160 pages, 2019, ISBN 1-4012-8918-5)
  - Sins of the Circle (collects #27–33, tpb, 144 pages, 2019, ISBN 1-4012-9454-5)
  - Infectious (includes #34–36, tpb, 280 pages, 2020, ISBN 1-77950-570-1)
    - Includes the Supergirl segment from the Superman: Leviathan Rising one-shot (written by Andreyko, art by Eduardo Pansica, 2019)

==== Wildstorm ====
- Eye of the Storm:
  - Black Sun #1–6 (with Trevor Scott, 2002–2003)
  - Masks: Too Hot for TV!: "Redhawk" (with Richard Corben, anthology one-shot, 2004)
- Friday the 13th: Pamela's Tale #1–2 (with Shawn Moll, 2007) collected in Friday the 13th: Book Two (tpb, 160 pages, 2008, ISBN 1-4012-2003-7)
- The Ferryman #1–5 (script by Andreyko based on the concept by Joel Silver, art by Jonathan Wayshak, 2008–2009)
- Trick 'r Treat (with various artists, graphic novel, 96 pages, 2009, ISBN 1-4012-2588-8)

=== IDW Publishing ===
- Castlevania: The Belmont Legacy #1–5 (with E. J. Su, 2005) collected as Castlevania: The Belmont Legacy (tpb, 128 pages, 2005, ISBN 1-933239-19-0)
- Pantheon #1–5 (script by Andreyko based on the concept by Michael Chiklis, art by Steve Molnar, 2010) collected as Pantheon (tpb, 128 pages, 2010, ISBN 1-60010-799-0)
- G.I. Joe: Origins #12: "Firsts and Lasts" (with Ben Templesmith, 2010) collected in G.I. Joe: Origins Omnibus Volume 1 (tpb, 296 pages, 2014, ISBN 1-61377-867-8)
- True Blood: Tainted Love #1–6 (co-written by Andreyko and Michael McMillian, art by Steve Molnar and Joe Corroney, 2011) collected as True Blood: Tainted Love (hc, 160 pages, 2011, ISBN 1-61377-019-7; tpb, 2013, ISBN 1-61377-804-X)
- The Illegitimates #1–6 (co-written by Andreyko and Taran Killam, art by Kevin Sharpe, 2013–2014) collected as The Illegitimates (hc, 152 pages, 2014, ISBN 1-63140-036-3)
- Love is Love: "Falling in Love" (with George Pérez; Andreyko was also an editor on this project (along with Sarah Gaydos and Jamie S. Rich) and wrote the afterword, anthology graphic novel, 144 pages, 2016, ISBN 1-63140-939-5)

=== Dynamite Entertainment ===
- Dark Shadows:
  - Dark Shadows/Vampirella #1–5 (with Patrick Berkenkotter (#1–2) and Jose Malaga, 2012) collected as Dark Shadows/Vampirella (tpb, 112 pages, 2013, ISBN 1-60690-395-0)
  - Dark Shadows: Year One #1–6 (with Guiu Vilanova, 2013) collected as Dark Shadows: Year One (tpb, 128 pages, 2014, ISBN 1-60690-495-7)
- Chastity #1–6 (with Dave Acosta, 2014) collected as Chastity: Life/Death (tpb, 160 pages, 2015, ISBN 1-60690-589-9)
- Legenderry: Red Sonja:
  - Legenderry: Red Sonja #1–5 (with Aneke and Juanan Ramírez (#4), 2015) collected as Volume 1 (tpb, 128 pages, 2015, ISBN 1-60690-782-4)
  - Legenderry: Red Sonja vol. 2 #1–5 (with Igor Lima (#1–2) and Rodney Buchemi, 2018) collected as Volume 2 (tpb, 128 pages, 2015, ISBN 1-5241-0776-X)
- Jeepers Creepers #1–5 (with Kewber Baal, 2018) collected as Jeepers Creepers: Trail of the Beast (tpb, 128 pages, 2019, ISBN 1-5241-0792-1)

=== Other publishers ===
- Aspen MLT:
  - Aspen Showcase: Kiani (with Scott Clark, one-shot, 2009)
  - Executive Assistant Violet #1–3 (with Pop Mhan, 2011) collected in Executive Assistant: The Hit List Agenda (tpb, 224 pages, 2012, ISBN 0-9854473-1-1)
- Clive Barker's Nightbreed vol. 2 (with Piotr Kowalski, Emmanuel Xerx Javier and Devmalya Pramanik (#9–11), Boom! Studios, 2014–2015) collected as:
  - Volume 1 (collects #1–4, tpb, 128 pages, 2015, ISBN 1-60886-683-1)
  - Volume 2 (collects #5–8, tpb, 112 pages, 2016, ISBN 1-60886-778-1)
  - Volume 3 (collects #9–12, tpb, 112 pages, 2017, ISBN 1-60886-924-5)
- Rise: Comics Against Bullying #2: "Flashback" (with Sina Grace, anthology, Northwest Press, 2015)
- Airwolf: Airstrikes #5: "Smash and Grab" (with Fabiano Neves, digital, Lion Forge, 2015) collected in Airwolf: Airstrikes (tpb, 144 pages, IDW Publishing, 2015, ISBN 1-63140-315-X)
- Tori Amos: Little Earthquakes: "Sweet Dreams" (with Piotr Kowalski, anthology graphic novel, 120 pages, Z2 Comics, 2022, ISBN 1-954928-61-0)
- Flash Gordon Quarterly #2–5: "Flash Gordon and the Madness of M'nnngh" (with Igor Lima, anthology, Mad Cave Studios, 2024–2025)
- Stardust the Super Wizard Anthology: "Love is Blind" (with Scott Morse, anthology one-shot, Blue Creek Creative, 2025)

Preceded by J. H. Williams III; W. Haden Blackman	Batwoman writer 2014–2015	Succeeded by Marguerite Bennett; James Tynion IV
Preceded by Tom DeFalco (Savage Hawkman)	Hawkman writer 2016–2017	Succeeded by Robert Venditti
Preceded by Steve Orlando; Jody Houser	Supergirl writer 2018–2020	Succeeded by Jody Houser
