= Taran Killam =

American actor, comedian, and writer (born 1982)

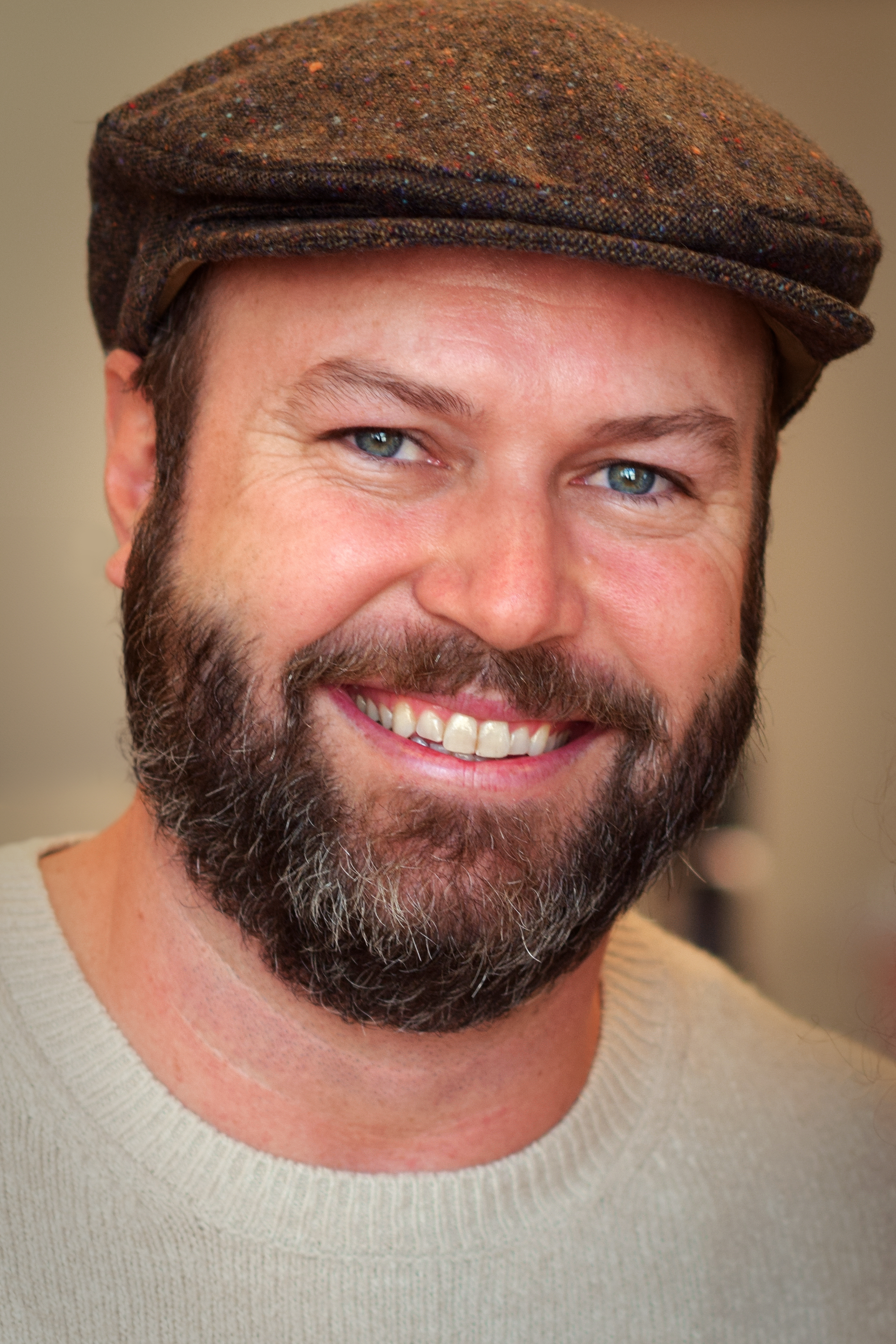
- Killam in 2024
- Born: Taran Hourie Killam; April 1, 1982 (age 44); Culver City, California, U.S.
- Occupations: Actor; comedian
- Years active: 1993–present
- Spouse: Cobie Smulders (m. 2012)
- Children: 2

Taran Hourie Killam (born April 1, 1982) is an American actor and comedian. He first garnered attention for his brief stint on the Fox comedy series MADtv during its seventh season between 2001 and 2002, followed by his wider success as a cast member on the NBC sketch comedy series Saturday Night Live from 2010 to 2016. He has also appeared in other television series such as Wild 'n Out, The Amanda Show, How I Met Your Mother, New Girl, and in the main cast of Single Parents. Killam is also known for his portrayal of a teen pop star in the 2004 Disney Channel Original Movie Stuck in the Suburbs. He voiced the title character on the PBS children's cartoon series Nature Cat.

Killam is also known for his roles in Broadway theatre. He played the role of King George III in Hamilton at the Richard Rodgers Theatre from January 17, 2017 to April 13, 2017. He returned to Broadway in Spamalot at the St. James Theatre, where he played the role of Lancelot from October 31, 2023 to January 7, 2024.

== Early life ==
Killam was born on April 1, 1982, in Culver City, California, and lived in Big Bear Lake, California, until age 15. His mother toured with The Charlie Daniels Band and has been described as a singer-songwriter. His father worked as a contractor and was a part of the City Garage Theatre Group and has been described as having had acting ambitions. Killam is also the great-nephew of Rosemarie Bowe, wife of actor Robert Stack. Taran has several siblings including a younger brother Taylor and sister Danielle.

Killam attended the Los Angeles County High School for the Arts. Killam studied musical theater at UCLA's School of Theater, Film and Television, where he "spent much of his time working on UCLA's Theater Festival", but left UCLA to pursue his acting career.

== Career ==
=== Early career ===
In 1994, Killam made his first film appearance as a boy in Naked Gun 33 1/3: The Final Insult. Killam was featured on Nickelodeon's The Amanda Show, a sketch-comedy vehicle for Amanda Bynes. He played Spaulding, a boy with a crush on the character Moody, in the soap opera parody Moody's Point.

Killam joined the cast of MADtv as a featured player during its seventh season from 2001 to 2002. Of the 25 episodes that aired during MADtv's seventh season, Killam appeared in 13. Joining the MADtv cast at age 19, Killam was the youngest cast member hired on the show and the only cast member on MADtv to get his start on children's shows (similar to Kenan Thompson on Saturday Night Live). He was a regular cast member on the third and fourth seasons of Wild 'n Out. In 2005, Killam co-starred in the television pilot Nobody's Watching, which never aired on network TV. The pilot gained popularity after it was leaked online and webisodes were produced from 2006 to 2007.

Killam co-starred in the 2004 Disney Channel original film Stuck in the Suburbs. After MADtv, Killam appeared on TV shows such as Jake in Progress, Still Standing, Boston Public, Drake & Josh, Do Over, Roswell and Judging Amy. He has appeared on Scrubs and Scrubs: Interns as Jimmy (the Overly Touchy Orderly). Killam appeared as a contestant on the December 7, 2006 episode of The Price Is Right.

He appeared in Big Fat Liar, Just Married, Anderson's Cross, and My Best Friend's Girl.

Killam was a member of the Los Angeles-based improvisational and sketch-comedy troupe the Groundlings. He retired from the main company in 2012.

=== Saturday Night Live ===
On September 25, 2010, Killam joined the cast of Saturday Night Live for the 36th season, making him the second Nickelodeon veteran (after Kenan Thompson) to join SNL and the second SNL cast member who was previously a cast member on the sketch show MADtv (after Jeff Richards). Killam named Eddie Murphy as his favorite SNL cast member and Arcade Fire as his favorite musical guest. In August 2016, Killam and castmate Jay Pharoah left the show. Killam said he was not told why his contract was not renewed.

On November 10, 2012, Killam appeared with Kenan Thompson and Anne Hathaway in an SNL music video, "The Legend of Mokiki and the Sloppy Swish". Mokiki is a laboratory test subject who wanders Manhattan performing a shuffling dance move known as the "Sloppy Swish". The sketch briefly became an Internet phenomenon and garnered Killam media and public attention. Mike Ryan of The Huffington Post wrote, "It is one of the most bizarre things to ever air on SNL, yet, the next day, everyone was talking about the Sloppy Swish."

=== Other work ===
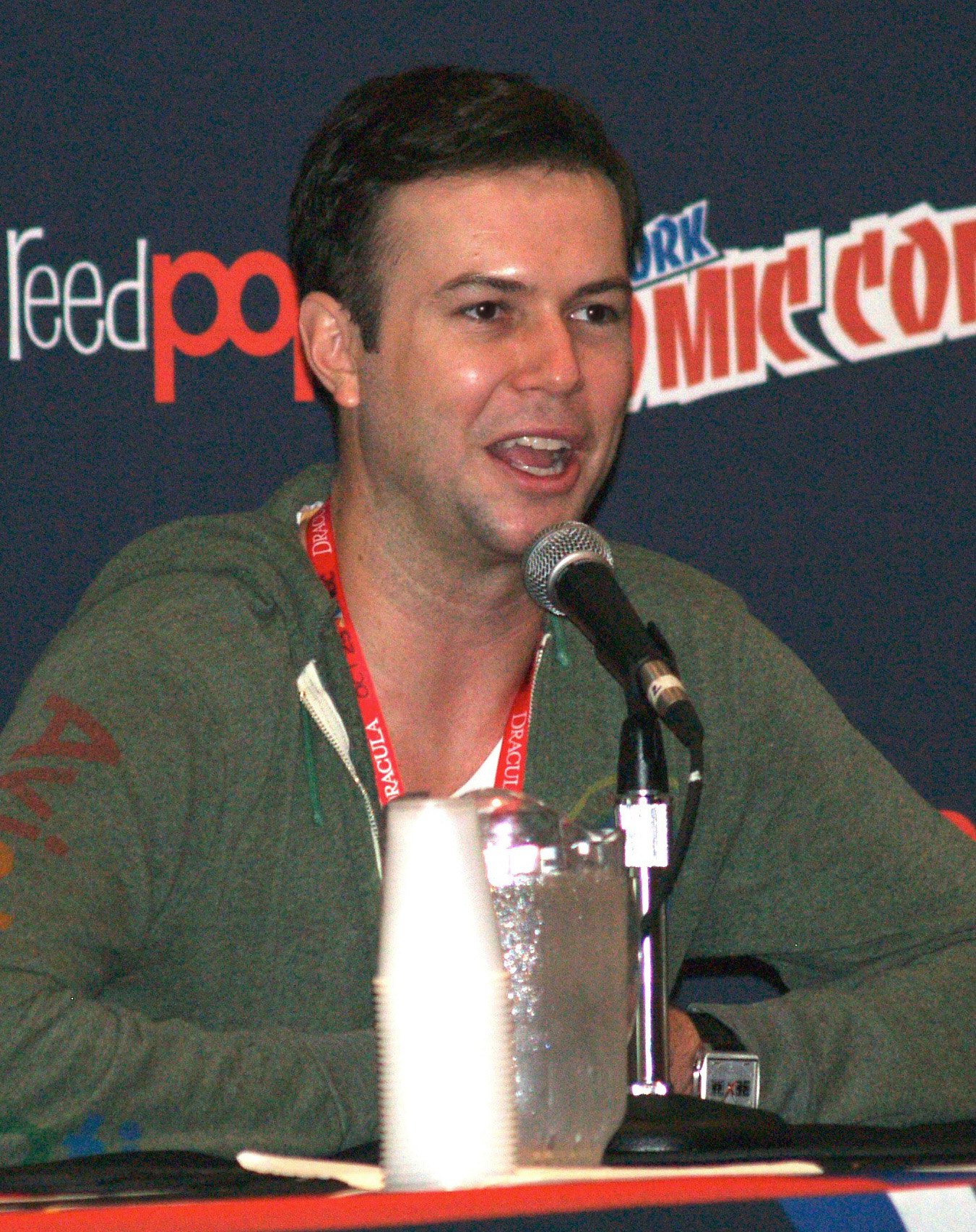
Killam in 2013

In December 2011, Killam replicated the Robyn video "Call Your Girlfriend" in a small writer's room and posted it to YouTube. The video went viral and by February 2022, it had been viewed more than 1,277,875 times. The late night antics briefly became an Internet phenomenon and garnered Killam media and public attention. When interviewed on Late Night with Jimmy Fallon, Killam stated that he had not known the dance shown in the song's official video until Robyn was scheduled to appear on SNL as a guest; he watched the video repeatedly until he could perform it himself.

In 2011, Killam appeared in Community episode "Regional Holiday Music" as Mr. Radison (Mr. Rad), a parody of Will Schuester from Glee. In 2012, he appeared in iCarly episode "iMeet the First Lady" as a Secret Service agent.

Killam co-starred in the 2013 comedy film The Heat. Killam voices Zip "Frantic" Danger on the Hulu original series The Awesomes.

In 2013, Killam ventured into the spy genre and the comics industry with The Illegitimates, a six-issue comics miniseries co-written by Marc Andreyko, illustrated by Kevin Sharpe and published by IDW Publishing. The series focuses on a team of illegitimate siblings who are charged with taking the place of their father, Jack Steele, a James Bond-like spy, after his death. The first issue was published December 18, 2013, and received mixed reviews.

Killam appears in the 2013 film 12 Years a Slave, playing the role of Abram Hamilton, one of the men who abducts Solomon Northup into slavery.

Killam is a fan of the Teenage Mutant Ninja Turtles franchise, Raphael his favorite turtle, and successfully lobbied for a role in the 2014 film as Channel 5 staff.

Killam made six guest appearances as Gary Blauman on his wife Cobie Smulders' TV series, How I Met Your Mother. His first appearance was in the March 20, 2006, episode, "Life Among the Gorillas" and the final one was the March 24, 2014, episode, "The End of the Aisle".

From 2015 to 2025, Killam provided the voice of the titular character on the PBS Kids show Nature Cat, along with SNL alumni Kate McKinnon, Bobby Moynihan, and Kenan Thompson.

On January 17, 2017, Killam succeeded Rory O'Malley in the role of King George III in the Broadway musical Hamilton.

Killam produced, scripted, directed and starred in the comic hitman film Killing Gunther, given a general release in fall 2017. Arnold Schwarzenegger, who played Gunther in the film, served as executive producer for it.

In March 2018, Killam was cast as a lead in the comedy pilot Single Parents for ABC, which was picked up to series for a premiere on September 26 of that year.

Killam plays the recurring role of Ludo Radovic in the series High Potential, which started airing on ABC in 2024. He was slated to play the role of Officer Lockstock in New York City Center's Encores! 2025 production of Urinetown, but dropped out after losing his home in the January 2025 Southern California wildfires.

== Personal life ==
After several years of dating, Killam and actress Cobie Smulders became engaged in January 2009. They married on September 8, 2012, in Solvang, California. The couple have two daughters, born in 2009 and 2015. In January 2025, Killam and Smulders' home in Pacific Palisades, Los Angeles was destroyed by a wildfire.

Killam is an avid fan of the Los Angeles Rams, often being spotted at their home games.

== Filmography ==
=== Film ===
| Year | Title | Role | Notes |
|---|---|---|---|
| 1994 | Naked Gun 33 1/3: The Final Insult | Boy of Geriatric Park | |
| 2002 | Big Fat Liar | Bret Callaway | |
| 2003 | Just Married | Dickie McNerney | |
| 2006 | The Showdown | The Batter | Short film |
| 2006 | Dr. Miracles | Mr. Peterson | Short film |
| 2007 | Epic Movie | Pirate | |
| 2008 | My Best Friend's Girl | Josh | |
| 2009 | Three Matthew McConaugheys and a Baby | Matthew McConaughey | Short film |
| 2010 | Anderson's Cross | Austin Wilson | |
| 2013 | The Heat | Adam/Simon Larkin | |
| 2013 | Grown Ups 2 | Male Cheerleader | Cameo |
| 2013 | 12 Years a Slave | Abram Hamilton | |
| 2014 | Teenage Mutant Ninja Turtles | Jim McNaughton | |
| 2015 | Ted 2 | Himself | |
| 2015 | Underdogs | Captain Skip / Rufus (voice) | |
| 2016 | Casual Encounters | Justin Davis | |
| 2016 | Brother Nature | Roger Fellner | Also writer |
| 2017 | All Nighter | Gary | |
| 2017 | Killing Gunther | Blake | Also director, producer, and writer, directorial debut |
| 2018 | Night School | Stewart | |
| 2023 | Spider-Man: Across the Spider-Verse | Patrick O'Hara / Web-Slinger and Widow (voice) | |
| 2023 | River Wild | Gray Reese | |

=== Television ===
| Year | Title | Role | Notes |
|---|---|---|---|
| 2000 | The Jersey | Varsity 1 | Episode: "Nick's a Chick" |
| 2000 | Judging Amy | Freddie Felleman | Episode: "The Wee Hours" |
| 2000 | Touched by an Angel | Teenage Robert | Episode: "The Grudge" |
| 2000–2002 | The Amanda Show | Spaulding | 7 episodes |
| 2001 | Undressed | Blake | 4 episodes (409, 410, 411 & 412) |
| 2001 | Roswell | Malamud | Episode: "Heart of Mine" |
| 2001–2002 | MADtv | Various | 13 episodes |
| 2002 | Do Over | Dave | Episode: "The Block Party" |
| 2003 | All That | Host | Special: "R U All That?: Nickelodeon's Search for the Funniest Kid in America" |
| 2004 | Drake & Josh | Trevor | Episode: "Dune Buggy" |
| 2004 | Boston Public | Alex Buchanan | Episode: "Chapter Seventy-Eight" |
| 2004 | Still Standing | Andy | Episode: "Still Narcing" |
| 2004 | Stuck in the Suburbs | Jordan Cahill | TV film |
| 2005 | Jake in Progress | Todd | Episode: "Loose Thread" |
| 2006 | Girlfriends | Jordan Gray | Episode: "Hustle & Dough" |
| 2006–2014 | How I Met Your Mother | Gary Blauman | 6 episodes |
| 2006–2007 | Wild 'n Out | Various | 29 episodes |
| 2007 | Nick Cannon Presents: Short Circuitz | Various | 8 episodes, also writer |
| 2007 | Super Sweet 16: The Movie | Conrad St. Jones | Television film (MTV) |
| 2009 | Scrubs | Jimmy | 4 episodes |
| 2009 | Scrubs: Interns | Jimmy | Episode: "The Late Night with Jimmy Show" |
| 2010–2016 | Saturday Night Live | Himself, Various | 126 episodes |
| 2011 | Community | Professor Cory Radison / Mr. Rad | Episode: "Regional Holiday Music" |
| 2012 | iCarly | Agent Kinsey | Episode: "iMeet the First Lady" |
| 2012 | Saturday Night Live Weekend Update Thursday | Patient, Steve Doocy, Guy | 2 episodes |
| 2013–2018 | Drunk History | Various | 6 episodes |
| 2013–2015 | The Awesomes | Zip "Frantic" Danger (voice) | Main role, 30 episodes |
| 2014 | Comedy Bang! Bang! | Smith Calvins | Episode: "Jenna Fischer Wears a Floral Blouse & Black Heels" |
| 2014 | Sesame Street | Professor Buck Awe | Episode: "School for Chickens" |
| 2015–2025 | Nature Cat | Nature Cat (voice) | Main role, 98 episodes |
| 2016 | New Girl | Fred | Episode: "What About Fred" |
| 2016 | Mating | Jay | Pilot |
| 2018 | A.P. Bio | Mr. Vining | Episode: "Teacher Jail" |
| 2018 | Dallas & Robo | Bright Eyes / various (voice) | 4 episodes |
| 2018 | Robot Chicken | Various voices | Episode: "Ext. Forest Day" |
| 2018–2020 | Single Parents | Will Cooper | Main role, 45 episodes |
| 2018 | We Bare Bears | Willoughby-Wentworth (voice) | Episode: "Adopted" |
| 2018 | Angie Tribeca | Pierre Cardin | 6 episodes |
| 2019 | Documentary Now! | Benedict Juniper | Episode: "Original Cast Album: Co-Op" |
| 2019 | Arrested Development | Young George Bluth, Sr. | 3 episodes |
| 2019 | Full Frontal with Samantha Bee | Zam Larson | Episode: "Not the White House Correspondents' Dinner" |
| 2019 | What Just Happened??! with Fred Savage | Himself | Episode: "Elevator" |
| 2019 | Star Wars Resistance | Stormtrooper #2 (voice) | Episode: "Station to Station" |
| 2020 | The Simpsons | Glen Tangier/Airshot (voice) | Episode: "Bart the Bad Guy" |
| 2020 | Loafy | Hypnotist Hwayne / Punk Kid #2 (voice) | 2 episodes |
| 2020 | Vampirina | Ichabod Crane (voice) | Episode: "A Tale of Two Hollows" |
| 2020 | The George Lucas Talk Show | Himself | Episode: "Revenge of the Sick" |
| 2021 | Star Wars: The Bad Batch | Depot Manager / Goatal / Landspeeder Driver (voice) | Episode: "Cornered" |
| 2021 | Impeachment: American Crime Story | Steve Jones | Recurring role, 5 episodes |
| 2021 | Mr. Mayor | Taryn Digiacomo | Episode: "Mr. Mayor's Magical L.A. Christmas" |
| 2022 | The Boss Baby: Back in the Crib | Ace Perfection (voice) | Episode: "The Great Medieval London Fire of 1135" |
| 2022–2023 | The NFL Pile On | Host | |
| 2023–2024 | Star Wars: Young Jedi Adventures | Hap / various (voice) | 18 episodes |
| 2024–present | High Potential | Ludo Radovic | Recurring role |
| 2025 | The Residence | St. Pierre | Recurring role |
| 2025 | Saturday Night Live 50th Anniversary Special | Himself | Television special, NBC |
| 2025–2026 | Stumble | Boon E. Potter | Main role |

=== Theatre ===
| Year | Title | Role | Notes |
|---|---|---|---|
| 2015 | Little Shop of Horrors | Orin Scrivello & Others | Off-Broadway; Encores! |
| 2017 | Hamilton | King George III | Broadway debut, Replaced Rory O'Malley |
| 2023–2024 | Spamalot | Sir Lancelot / The French Taunter / Knight of Ni / Tim the Enchanter | Broadway |
| 2023 | Gutenberg! The Musical! | The Guest Producer | Broadway, One night appearance |
| 2024 | The 25th Annual Putnam County Spelling Bee | Vice Principal Douglas Panch | Kennedy Center |

== Bibliography ==
- The Illegitimates #1–6 (2013)
