= Clip show =

Type of television series episode

A clip show or a recap episode is an episode of a television series that consists primarily of excerpts from previous episodes. Most clip shows include a frame story in which cast members recall events from past installments of the show, depicted with a clip of the event presented as a flashback. Clip shows are also known as cheaters, particularly in the field of animation. Clip shows are often played before series finales as a way to summarize the entire series, or once syndication becomes highly likely as a way to increase the number of episodes that can be sold. Other times, however, clip shows are simply produced for budgetary reasons (e.g. to avoid additional costs from shooting in a certain setting, or from casting actors to appear in new material).

== Origin ==
Clip shows have their origin in theatrical short films and serials. Every serial chapter always had a brief recap showing where the previous chapter left off, but, beginning in 1936, entire chapters were largely devoted to material that audiences had already seen. In these "recap chapters"(also called "economy chapters"), previous chapters were summarized for those who may have missed some episodes (which were unlikely to be rerun). The practice began with the Republic Pictures serial Robinson Crusoe of Clipper Island. Adverse weather conditions slowed the filming of the series, which had been budgeted for 12 chapters, and screenwriter Barry Shipman was forced to create two more chapters to recoup the lost production costs. Shipman wrote a few scenes in which the screen characters recount their adventures to date, and footage from previous chapters is shown instead of new sequences. Shipman's brainstorm was a convenient way to economize on production, and soon Republic made the recap chapter standard procedure.

Movie studios often resorted to old footage to save money. The most famous example is the short comedies of The Three Stooges which, from 1949 until 1957, borrowed lengthy sequences and often entire storylines from old shorts. Only a few new scenes would be filmed as a framework for the old footage. This practice was adopted because the studios could charge more money for "new" films than for old ones; this also allowed the series to continue producing shorts after Shemp Howard died, using carefully obscured body doubles to blend the old footage.

Animation studios were also known to periodically make cartoon shorts—often referred to as "cheaters"—made up primarily of clips from earlier cartoons in order to save money. Examples of this include Betty Boop's Rise to Fame (Fleischer/Paramount, 1934), What's Cookin' Doc? (Schlesinger/Warner Bros., 1944) and a regular yearly series of Tom & Jerry "cheaters" such as Smitten Kitten (MGM, 1952).

== Variations ==
One variant of the modern clip show is the compilation episode, using clips from the most popular episodes, assembled together in one episode, sometimes without a frame story as such.

Another format is to have a host who describes various characters and characteristics of the show to introduce various clips from past episodes. For example, a special one-hour clip show episode of All in the Family featured actor Henry Fonda discussing the main characters on the show followed by relevant clips from previous episodes; a similar two-part clip show appeared on Three's Company, hosted by Lucille Ball. This format was parodied in a clip show for The Simpsons ("The Simpsons 138th Episode Spectacular"), in which fictional actor Troy McClure—a recurring Simpsons character—introduced the clips.

A third variation, used in a two-part clip show episode of Cheers featured the entire cast of the show, including former cast members, sitting on a stage while being interviewed by talk host John McLaughlin about their characters on the show, with clips of previous episodes mixed in. A similar clip episode of Barney Miller aired after the death of cast member Jack Soo, with flashbacks introduced by the rest of the cast highlighting Soo's character Detective Sergeant Nick Yamana.

In anime and tokusatsu series, a common type of episode is the "recap episode", which presents clips from previous episodes in a manner to remind viewers of the story so far and help newer viewers catch up on the plot and details. In tokusatsu, the episode is often used to give the actors and crew a week off or a lighter load around the time of a holiday (typically in the summer or during Golden Week).

== Rationale ==
While clip shows do reduce production costs, they were originally employed in an era when there were far fewer program outlets and it was less likely that episodes from previous seasons would be aired again. Clip shows typically received strong ratings, and it was expected for any successful comedy series to feature clip shows regularly in its later years. However, the episodes were subject to some ridicule due to their forced or "corny" framing devices (such as a family sitting peacefully around a fireplace) and the frequently awkward transitions between the frame story and the clips (such as characters staring into space while the screen blurs to represent "remembering").

Daytime soap operas frequently present clip shows as a way to commemorate a show's milestone anniversary or the death or exit of a long-running character. Many fans take advantage of the shows in order to see vintage clips of a particular soap opera. One example was an episode of As the World Turns in which seven of the longest running characters were stranded in a forest and remembered some of their best moments, all in honor of AtWT's 50th anniversary.

Another common rationale for a clip show is the lack of a new show to air due to a failure to meet production schedules. At the end of its second season, Star Trek: The Next Generation had one more episode to shoot. However, Paramount cut that show's budget to make up for an episode earlier in the season that had gone over budget—and, similarly, over schedule, leaving only three days for principal photography. Because the season had gotten off to a slow start due to a writers' strike, the producers had no scripts set aside for future use as they normally would have. The result was "Shades of Gray", in which the "clips" were the induced dreams of a comatose William T. Riker. The episode is widely considered among the worst of any Star Trek series.

Clip shows may offset such criticism by trying to make the frame tale surrounding the clips compelling, or by presenting clip shows without any framing device. A show might also defuse the awkwardness by indulging in self-parody, such as intentionally acknowledging or over-playing the device (including flashbacks with deliberate changes to the footage for comedic purposes). During its third season, Moonlighting (which had been known for frequently breaking the fourth wall) produced a clip show episode—"The Straight Poop"— in which gossip columnist Rona Barrett investigated the strained relationship of its lead characters to see if they themselves were responsible for the show's infamous production issues. Clerks: The Animated Series parodied the format by running a clip show as its second episode, even though there was only one prior episode from which to pull material.

Two Dan Harmon series used the device to present newly-created scenes instead, including the Community episodes "Paradigms of Human Memory" and "Curriculum Unavailable" (with the latter showing alternate perspectives and unseen events from previous episodes), and the Rick and Morty episode "Total Rickall" (which used flashbacks that were false memories implanted by parasites).

The clip show has been employed more seriously as a means to bring viewers up to date on highly serialized dramas, such as on Lost, Once Upon a Time and the reimagined Battlestar Galactica. Many anime dramas used similar techniques, particularly when a series ran for more episodes in one season than could be reasonably rerun (such as Mobile Suit Gundam Wing running for 49 episodes, which were originally aired weekly). Avatar: The Last Airbender similarly aired a recap episode, "The Ember Island Players", prior to its four-part series finale, in which the main characters watched a Fire Nation-produced play that summarized the plot of the series in an exaggerated manner.

Sometimes clip shows air before or during a series finale as a way for audiences to reminisce about their favorite moments. Some examples of shows that have used clip shows in this sense are: Animaniacs, Captain Scarlet and the Mysterons, Frasier, The Golden Girls, Joe 90, Seinfeld, Friends, Thunderbirds, Everybody Loves Raymond, The Outer Limits, Stargate SG-1, Stargate Atlantis, and Cheers.

Clip shows are also a way to compile the best episodes or sketches from a series to air in a single, concise package when rerunning a whole episode or series is implausible. The annual Scottish New Year special Scotch and Wry was condensed into four feature film-length episodes for home video release. Carson's Comedy Classics compiled memorable sketches from the first 20 seasons of The Tonight Show Starring Johnny Carson for airing in syndication. Surviving content from Bozo the Clown and other Chicago children's television programs was incorporated into Bozo, Gar and Ray: WGN TV Classics, an annual holiday special.

Clip shows can allow a series to continue for a short period after a prominent figure departs or dies, with remaining cast members or guest hosts substituting in the absent cast member's stead. Shows that were extended in this manner include Chappelle's Show and The Rush Limbaugh Show.

== See also ==
- Bottle episode
- Compilation movie
- Filler (media)
- Fix-up
