= The Illegitimates =

American comic book series

- Cover art for The Illegitimates #1 (March 2012). Art by Jerry Ordway.

Publication information
- Publisher: IDW Publishing
- Schedule: Monthly
- Format: Limited series
- Genre: Espionage/Action-adventure
- Publication date: December 2013
- No. of issues: 6

Creative team
- Created by: Taran Killiam
- Written by: Taran Killam; Marc Andreyko
- Artist(s): Kevin Sharpe (interiors); Jerry Ordway (cover of issue #1)

The Illegitimates is a six-issue, 2013 American espionage comic book miniseries created by actor/comedian Taran Killam, written by Killam and comic book writer/novelist Marc Andreyko, illustrated by Kevin Sharpe, and featuring a first issue cover by Jerry Ordway. It is published by IDW Publishing, and premiered on December 18, 2013. The book focuses on a team of illegitimate siblings who are charged with taking the place of their father, Jack Steele, a James Bond-like superspy, after his death.

== Publication history ==
The Illegitimates was conceived by actor/comedian Taran Killam, who first became interested in comics through the 1991 book X-Men #1, which was illustrated by Jim Lee. Killam also is an avid fan of the James Bond franchise, naming On Her Majesty's Secret Service and the Nintendo 64 game Goldeneye as memorable aspects of his college experiences, and Sean Connery, Goldfinger and Skyfall as his favorite Bond actor, film and theme, respectively. Killam was inspired by the observation that the amount of unprotected sex that a superspy like James Bond would have would produce many children, which provides an unusual permutation to the mythology of the Bond Girl. In this way, Bond is more of a springboard to the book's premise rather than a recurring motif, and Killam stresses that the series core concept is entirely distinct from Bond.

Killam pitched his idea, which included the first story arc, to comic book writer and novelist Marc Andreyko sometime between 2007 and 2009. Although Killam could not afford to finance the book at the time, after he joined the cast of the comedy sketch show Saturday Night Live in 2010, he decided to use his resources to pursue publishing it. Killam does most of the writing, and Andreyko says that his job is to "smooth out the rough edges". Following a fortuitous encounter with DC Comics editor Mike Marts, Andreyko put Killam in touch with artist Kevin Sharpe, whom Killam hand-picked for the series. Andreyko then contacted IDW Publishing, and the creators pitched the book to IDW Editor-in-Chief Chris Ryall, who was highly impressed with the idea, after which a deal was struck between the creators and the publisher.

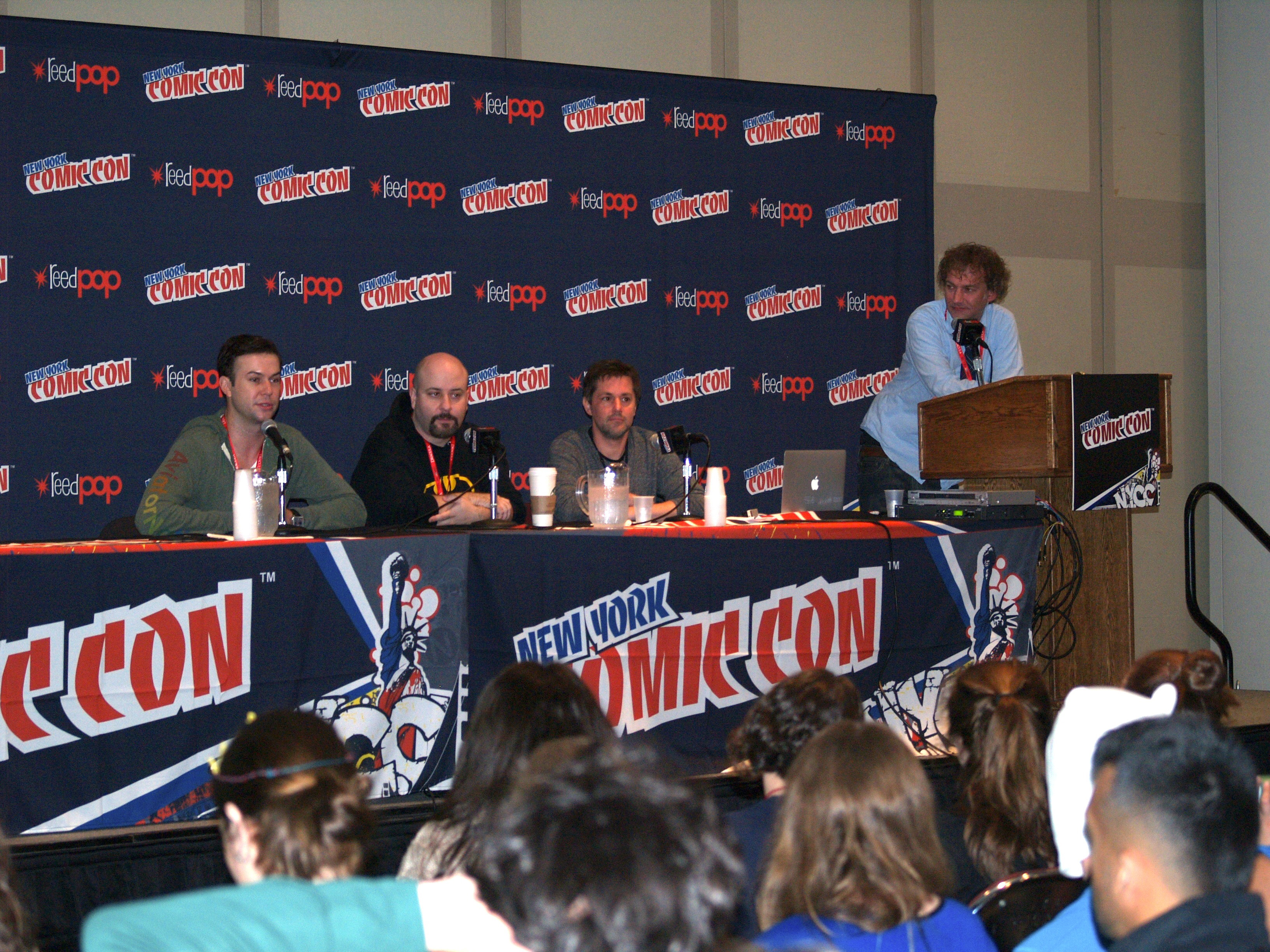
A panel discussion on the series at the 2013 New York Comic Con. From left to right: Taran Killam, Marc Andreyko, Chris Ryall and IDW VP of Marketing Dirk Wood.

The series focuses on a team of five illegitimate children, ages 18 – 30, of an aging Bond-like superspy named Jack Steele, who fathered them with various femme fatales over the course of his career. Although these five half-siblings have grown up in different parts of the world and unaware of one another, they were anonymously monitored and nurtured by Steele's employer, the international spy organization Olympus, as part of a secret project called Project Sire, with the expectation that they would one day come together to take their father's place, and if necessary, help save the world. When Steele is killed during a mission in the first issue, Olympus summons them together during such a crisis. Killam and Andreyko are fans of heroic fiction stories, such as The Magnificent Seven, The Dirty Dozen and King Arthur, in which a group is assembled of individuals who are each introduced in a way that establishes their unique characteristics, and thus, the first issue introduces the cast in this manner. The focus of the series is on the group dynamics among the siblings, including their rivalries and "daddy issues", in a manner similar to the X-Men. Although there is some humor in the series, in particular in the beginning of the story, the creators stress that it is not a parody of the spy genre like Austin Powers. Rather, Andreyko compared the series' concept to the 1999 film Galaxy Quest, in that it begins with a light-hearted, comedic tone, but shifts into a serious, less ironic one. The series is six issue long, and the first issue was published December 18, 2013.

Killam first publicly mentioned the book in a podcast in early 2013. He subsequently promoted the series that July at San Diego Comic-Con, and with a panel discussion featuring him, Andreyko and Ryall at the October 2013 New York Comic Con. Exclusive preview copies of the book's first issue featuring a special wraparound cover by Bill Willingham were available after the panel. Killam also appeared at a book signing at Midtown Comics in Manhattan on December 16, 2013.

Though Killam has expressed enthusiasm at the idea of a feature film adaptation of the comic, he and Ryall have stressed the importance of The Illegitimates standing on its own merits as a fully realized comic book, explaining that comics fans are discerning enough to detect when a comic is merely a converted film pitch.

== Plot ==
Jack Steele is a British superspy working for an organization called Olympus who works on a number of missions across the globe from 1962 to the present, during which he frequently engages in dalliances with a variety of women, a number of which result in children:

- In Africa in 1978 Steele is rescued from certain death by an unnamed female spy on a motorcycle.
- In Japan in 1982 Steele comes into conflict with a Yakuza assassin named Fumiko Kaze, and has a tumultuous affair with her.
- At an underwater enemy base in the Pacific Ocean in 1985, Steele joins forces with CIA agent Betty Darlington on the Diamond Foot case and the two barely escape their opponents.
- In the Colombian Amazon in 1991, Steele has an affair with Adalina Teresa Estrella Caliestas, the daughter of the President of Spain.
- Soon after the events in Colombia, Steele has an affair with Lordsley, a temporary personal assistant filling in for Miss Heatherpence, the assistant who normally works for Steele's superior, on a day when Heatherpence is out sick.

Steele's final mission occurs in Kharkiv, Ukraine in the present, when he and his archenemy, Marcus Dannikor, engage in physical combat on top of a speeding train, and the aging Steele is brutally killed. Knowing that Dannikor is planning some grand scheme, Edwards, Steele's superior, activates Project Sire, a classified project which has kept track of, and when necessary, secretly intervened in the lives of, the various children that Steele fathered: Vin Darlington, Kiken Kaze, Saalinge M'Chumba, Leandros Antonio Caliestes and Charlie Lordsley. However, Dannikor learns of these children as well.

As Olympus summons Steele's five children, Dannikor tests a new weapon, which broadcasts a signal that allows him to take control of people and have them do his bidding, and leaving without any memory of their actions. During the test, 15 people in Bern, Switzerland are made to empty out their bank accounts, totaling 320 million euros, an act that Dannikor intends to perform on a global scale. When Edwards meets with the assembled children, he tells them they must begin training in order to replace their father. Incredulous at the idea, and displeased to learn that Olympus has secretly interfered in their lives, the three brothers, Vin Darlington, Kiken Kaze and Leandros Caliestes, leave. Saalinge M'Chumba, however, would prefer not to return to the Johannesburg prison from which Olympus freed her, and decides to stay, along with her half-sister Charlie Lordsley. Edwards tells the sisters that they must learn how Dannikor took control of his victims' minds by infiltrating an upcoming gala at his mansion. Upon returning home, the brothers learn that their mothers have been kidnapped by Dannikor, in order to lure them to him. They return to Olympus to accept Edwards' offer in order to free them.

== Characters ==
Saalinge M'Chumba - Saalinge is from South Africa, and as the only one of the group with any actual espionage experience, she acts as the de facto leader of the group. Her mother was also a spy, and is the only mother of any of the siblings who is deceased. Killam characterizes her as a strong-willed "lone wolf" type who doesn't work well with others, and is in prison at the beginning of the story. Killam, who has a daughter with his wife, Cobie Smulders, comments, "Obviously, Bond has roots in misogyny. It's amazing what having a daughter will do to change your perception on just male and female roles. I think there's something very feminine about the character of Bond. He's very sensual in himself. So it only makes sense that of the five kids we meet, the alpha, the strongest, and in many ways the most macho is actually the female." Saalinge is the daughter of a woman that rescued Steele in Africa in 1978, and who has been dead for some time by the beginning of the series. Saalinge has been providing information to her ambassador uncle for years, though at the start of the story, she is held in the Johannesburg Women's Correctional Facility. She is described as "exceptionally beautiful, bit of a social nightmare. Doesn't play well with others."

Vin Darlington - A male Texan marksman depicted as macho, jingoistic and eager to see action. Although he has attempted to enlist in every possible branch of the U.S. armed forces, he was rejected, it is revealed, due to the intervention of Olympus, who wished to protect their asset. He is enthusiastic to learn about Olympus, and the truth about his father. His mother is Betty Darlington, who had an affair with Steele during the Diamond Foot case in the Pacific Ocean in 1985. She is now retired, and runs a wildlife preserve in West Texas.

Kiken Kaze - An alcoholic Japanese automobile enthusiast of whom it is said, "It if has an engine, he can make it go." He is the son of Yakuza assassin Fumiko Kaze, who had an affair with Steele in Japan in 1982, but Kiken has been estranged from her ever since the Yakuza exiled him and labeled him zetsuenjo (a term referring to someone who has betrayed the organization, is no longer entitled to membership and is being hunted).

Leandros Antonio Caliestes - He is the son of Adalina Teresa Estrella Caliestas, who is the daughter of former President of Spain Julio Armelindo Manuel Caliestas. He was conceived when Steele took advantage of Adaline in the Colombian Amazon in 1991. He is a mixed martial arts fighter with seven black belts and four brown belts with red stripes, and is also an underwear model. Despite being a "hulking beauty of a man", he is also an asthmatic "mama's boy", the "Cowardly Lion" of the group, and is utterly socially awkward around women.

Charlie Lordsley - The youngest of the five siblings, she is the technologically savvy "brains" of the team. She is an intern for Olympus who does data entry for Miss Heatherpence, the assistant to Steele's superior. Lordsley is the daughter of a woman who encountered Steele one day when she was filling in for Miss Heatherpence while the other woman was out due to illness. Heatherpence describes her as "sharp as a tack", with an "IQ off the charts".

Marcus Dannikor - The villain of the opening story arc. Dannikor is Steele's Blofeld-like archenemy. Described as "one of the most evil sons of bitches alive", Dannikor is CEO of Dannikor Concrete, which built the Berlin Wall and filled the Chernobyl Nuclear Power Plant.

Killam stated should the series be renewed into an ongoing series after the initial six-issue miniseries, it may be revealed that there are other Steele children in existence, including some that could themselves be villains. He also suggested that Kazei's Yakuza mother could become an antagonist as well.

== Critical reception ==
The series holds an average score of 6.4 out of 10 at the review aggregator website Comic Book Roundup.

Jeremy Konrad of Bleeding Cool gave a positive review to the first issue, praising its "crisp writing, quick pacing, and beautiful art", and likening the opening scenes to classic Bond films.

Marykate Jasper of Comic Book Resources gave the first issue two and a half out of five stars, opining it was not very well done. At issue for Jasper was the amount of space the book devoted to the vignettes that introduced each team member's mother, without developing any of them, Jack Steele, or the children, apart from broad stereotypes. Jasper felt more emphasis should have been given to the children rather than introducing the mothers, since the children will ostensibly be the stars of the series.

Vince Ostrowski of Multiversity Comics gave the issue a score of 6.7, calling it "a clever take on the James Bond archetype", with fewer laughs than expected, but which was bolstered by a better narrative structure than expected. Ostrowski stated that the issue felt like more of a non-issue, as very little story was presented, though he lauded the way Steele's death was handled. Ostrowski was also surprised at the lack of humor, but called it "a breezy, fun-enough ride for readers who are attentive enough to interpret the characters the right way." Ostrowski also thought Kevin Sharpe's art was uneven, but that it "hits a lot of the right notes at key points", and was aided by Peter Pantazis' colors.

Andy Hunsaker of CraveOnline gave the issue a score of 7.5, calling the concept "kind of funny", despite the straightforward take on the genre, and thought the quality of the dialogue was a drawback, though adequate. Hunsaker thought Sharpe's art was "a little stodgy", though very good where the rendering of faces was concerned. Overall Hunsaker thought the concept was a "cute" one that was handled decently, but was undecided as to whether it was viable enough to maintain the miniseries.

== See also ==
- Dynamo 5, a comic about the illegitimate children of a superhero.
