= Harley & Ivy Meet Betty & Veronica =

2017–18 US comic book miniseries

- Cover to Harley & Ivy Meet Betty & Veronica #1, art by Amanda Conner

Publication information
- Publisher: DC Comics; Archie Comics
- Schedule: Monthly
- Format: Limited
- Publication date: October 2017 – March 2018
- No. of issues: 6
- Main characters: Harley Quinn; Poison Ivy; Betty Cooper; Veronica Lodge

Creative team
- Written by: Marc Andreyko; Paul Dini
- Artist: Laura Braga
- Colorists: Arif Prianto; Tony Avina

Collected editions
- Harley & Ivy Meet Betty & Veronica: ISBN 978-1-4012-8033-8

Harley & Ivy Meet Betty & Veronica is a six-issue American comic book miniseries co-written by Marc Andreyko and Paul Dini, illustrated by Laura Braga. The intercompany crossover was published by DC Comics and Archie Comics from October 2017 to March 2018. A hardcover edition collecting the series was released in August 2018.

The series brings together two fictional pairs of established friends: DC's Harley Quinn and Poison Ivy and Archie's Veronica Lodge and Betty Cooper. Dini, who co-created Harley, brought Andreyko on to co-write with him. The series received mixed to positive reviews for its lighthearted plot.

In the story, Harley and Ivy accidentally switch bodies with Veronica and Betty. While Harley and Ivy try to stop Veronica's father from destroying a swamp in Riverdale, Betty and Veronica have to find their way back home while being chased by the Gotham City police and criminals.

== Publishing history ==
=== Production ===
Continuing the trend of unusual crossovers between Archie Andrews and other characters in comics such as Archie Meets the Punisher (1994) and Archie vs. Predator (2015), an intercompany publication with DC Comics was announced in July 2017. Co-written by Marc Andreyko and Paul Dini, the series brings DC Comics's Harley Quinn and Poison Ivy together with Archie Comics's Betty Cooper and Veronica Lodge in an out-of-continuity story. Both duos have established friendships in their respective fictional worlds. Harley was co-created by Dini and Bruce Timm in 1992 on Batman: The Animated Series, where her friendship with Ivy also began. Meanwhile, Betty and Veronica have been frenemies since their introduction in 1942.

Dini had long wanted to write for the Archie characters and jumped at the opportunity to work on the comic book. Dini also wanted to experience the series as a fan and felt that he would not be able to do so if he was the only writer. Dini approached Andreyko about the project because they had previously worked together on the 2016 comics anthology Love Is Love and Dini was impressed by the Andreyko's sense of humor and understanding of the characters. Andreyko considered it a privilege to work with Dini and readily agreed.

Meeting regularly over dinner, the writers found that the story came naturally once they settled on the basic premise. Andreyko described the plot as "a caper" and compared it to the 1962 comedy film It's a Mad, Mad, Mad, Mad World. For Andreyko, the difficulty of writing characters with such extensive histories was finding their "essences" from their many previous portrayals. The writers ultimately did not base their characterizations on any particular incarnations.

The series was illustrated by Laura Braga, an Italian comics artist and one of the artists for DC Comics Bombshells. Arif Prianto and Tony Avina colored issue #1 together, but the remaining issues were colored by Prianto alone.

=== Publication ===
The six issues were published monthly by DC Comics and Archie Comics, between October 4, 2017 and March 7, 2018. Each issue had a variant cover in addition to the main cover; the first issue also had an additional blank sketch variant cover. The first issue was the 34th best-selling comic book in North America for the month it was released, with estimated sales of 52,610 copies. Sales numbers fell by 60% through the sixth issue, which was the 104th best-selling comic in March 2018 with estimated sales of 20,730 copies. A hardcover edition collecting the series was released on August 29, 2018.

== Plot ==
Wealthy businessman Hiram Lodge announces his plan to turn Riverdale's Sweetwater Swamp into a tuition-free university. In Gotham City, Poison Ivy is enraged by the news as the swamp is home to dozens of rare plants. She convinces her friend and fellow criminal Harley Quinn to help her stop the Sweetwater project. The pair travel to Riverdale, and when they are not able to talk Hiram out of it, they decide that more drastic measures are required. That night, Harley and Ivy crash a costumed gala hosted by Hiram. Hiram's daughter Veronica Lodge and her friend Betty Cooper are also in attendance. Ivy and Harley cause trouble at the gala, first when Harley knocks out Reggie Mantle who is dressed as the Joker, then when they attempt to kidnap Veronica. Betty comes to Veronica's aid and the four of them get into a fight. Zatanna and Sabrina Spellman, who were hired as stage magicians, cast a spell to stop the fight. Unbeknownst to everyone, the spell goes awry causing Harley and Ivy to switch bodies with Betty and Veronica respectively. Catwoman, who happened to be at the gala as well, drives the unconscious Betty and Veronica back to Gotham City, thinking they are Harley and Ivy.

The next morning, Harley and Ivy wake up in Betty and Veronica's bodies. They use their new bodies to infiltrate the Sweetwater project and stop it from the inside. To keep up their cover, they attend Riverdale High School and hang out with Betty and Veronica's friends. After their plans to sabotage the project's building site are foiled, however, they realize they want their bodies back after all. Meanwhile in Gotham City, Betty and Veronica find that they have acquired Harley and Ivy's superpowers along with their bodies. As they try to make their way back to Riverdale, the pair are chased by the police, other Gotham criminals, and Reggie, who thinks he is the real Joker thanks to his concussion.

When Betty and Veronica return to Riverdale, Sabrina restores everyone to her proper body. Harley and Ivy reveal to Betty and Veronica that Hiram's business partner in the Sweetwater project is a well-known Gotham City criminal, Lenny the Lamprey. Learning of Lenny's plot to scam Hiram, Betty and Veronica agree to help stop the project. Their plans are foiled by Lenny and his men, who hold the four women captive at the Sweetwater building site. Lenny plans to set off explosives during the site's groundbreaking ceremony, thereby destroying the site and killing everyone there, allowing him to collect a big insurance payout. The four women escape and stop the explosives from killing anyone. Following the ordeal, Hiram announces that the Sweetwater project is cancelled and the swamp will be donated to the Riverdale Perseveration Society as a non-profit conservancy.

== Critical response ==
Critics gave the series mixed to positive reviews. According to review aggregator Comic Book Roundup, the first issue scored an average of 6.7/10 based on 25 reviews, while the series as a whole scored an average of 7.1/10 based on 64 reviews.

Reviews for the first issue were mixed. Comicosity thought it was a "great introduction" to the series and its characters, while ComicsVerse's Mara Danoff complimented the issue for not taking itself seriously, concluding it was "[n]othing overly substantial, but satisfying all the same". On the other hand, Newsarama's Kat Calamia found the issue "underwhelming" and Comic Book Resources's Emma Lawson was critical of what she saw as "a disappointing story with low stakes that relies on boring mean girl tropes". Later issues received more positive reviews for their lighthearted narrative. Danoff praised the "over-the-top silliness" of the plot and called the series fun and endearing. Writing for IGN, Calamia found the first four issues got "progressively more fun", but felt the series had dragged on for too long by issue #5.

Braga's art received mixed reviews. Critics noted that Braga had gone with the "more realistic" DC Comics style instead of the "traditionally cartoony nature" of Archie Comics. Comicosity thought that the art looked good but did not suit the Archie Comics setting. Calamia complimented Braga's pencil illustrations, particularly her characters' facial expressions, but felt that they were held back by the relatively dull color palette. While reviewers for Newsarama and IGN enjoyed the tone the art brought to the series, the latter found that the characters were sometimes difficult to tell apart due to the resemblance in their facial features.

== In other media ==
In Riverdale, Poison Ivy and Harley Quinn's costumes are worn by the characters Cheryl Blossom (Madelaine Petsch) and Toni Topaz (Vanessa Morgan) in the episode titled "Chapter Sixty-One: Halloween" as a reference to the comic book miniseries Harley & Ivy Meet Betty & Veronica.
