= Contemporary Impressionists =

- Community episode
- Episode no.: Season 3 Episode 12
- Directed by: Kyle Newacheck
- Written by: Alex Cooley
- Production code: 310
- Original air date: March 22, 2012

Guest appearances
- French Stewart as Vinnie; J. P. Manoux as Faux-by; Jim Meskimen as Christopher Walken/Tommy Lee Jones impersonator; Blake Anderson as attendant; Richard Erdman as Leonard; Brandon Killham as Howie

Episode chronology
← Previous "Urban Matrimony and the Sandwich Arts"	Next → "Digital Exploration of Interior Design"
- Community season 3

"Contemporary Impressionists" is the twelfth episode of the third season of the American television series Community. It originally aired on March 22, 2012 on NBC.

This episode was intended to air as the eleventh episode, before "Urban Matrimony and the Sandwich Arts", but was aired as the twelfth episode because, according to Dan Harmon, "coming out of hiatus they wanted to air an episode that was more accessible to a general audience". It also creates a small continuity error as a small thread of the Troy and Abed story from this episode continues in "Urban Matrimony".

== Plot ==
Jeff (Joel McHale) has been seeing a new therapist and prescribed anti-anxiety medication. Britta (Gillian Jacobs) worries that, without anxiety to keep his ego in check, Jeff's narcissism will grow out of control.

Abed (Danny Pudi) has been hiring celebrity impersonators to reenact scenes from his favorite movies. The other group members wonder how he is getting the money to pay them and consider telling him to stop, but Troy (Donald Glover) chastises them, reminding them that Abed has made all of their lives easier and more fun. At that point Vinnie (French Stewart), a French Stewart impersonator and the representative of the celebrity impersonator agency, arrives to collect $3,000 that Abed owes. Abed does not have the money, but Vinnie proposes to forgive the debt on condition that Abed's friends appear at a bar mitzvah dressed as celebrities. If they fail to perform, Vinnie threatens to have impersonators of Ving Rhames and Michael Chiklis break Abed's legs.

Meanwhile, Chang (Ken Jeong) is berated by Dean Pelton (Jim Rash) for recklessly shooting a tranquilizer gun on campus. He begs the dean for more authority and is grudgingly granted the right to hire "security interns" in exchange for college credits.

The study group arrive at the bar mitzvah in their costumes: Jeff as Ryan Seacrest, Troy as pre-cosmetic-surgery Michael Jackson, Britta as post-cosmetic-surgery Michael Jackson, Shirley as Oprah Winfrey, Annie as Judy Garland, Abed as Jamie Lee Curtis, and Pierce as "Fat Brando"—though he attempts to be perceived as Burt Reynolds instead. Chang, whose brother is the rabbi, schemes to recruit some boys as his "security interns" and the DJ, a Moby impersonator, as a substitute Dean Pelton. Many women flirt with Jeff, inflating his ego despite Britta's attempts to humble him. When Howie Schwartz, the guest of honor, receives a series of sham awards including "Most Handsome Young Man," Jeff explodes with rage, tearing his tuxedo and storming the podium to seize the award statuette. Chang shoots him with the tranquilizer gun, and he blunders out of the party. Howie and the other guests mistake his outburst for an impersonation of the Incredible Hulk and are suitably impressed. Vinnie agrees that Abed's debt has been paid.

After the party, Britta finds Jeff sleeping off the tranquilizer dart on the side of the road. He apologizes for his behavior and asks if he can be her test subject for psychology class. Britta declines, saying she wants someone more normal, like Abed.

When Troy gets home, he finds Abed has hired more impersonators. Troy kicks them out, and Abed asks if Troy is mad at him. Troy equivocates but confesses that he is mad, insisting that Abed trust his judgement in the future. Abed reluctantly agrees and leaves to play alone in the Dreamatorium, where Evil Abed (Note: As seen in "Remedial Chaos Theory.") appears and encourages him to embrace his darker side.

== Cultural references ==
The line in which Abed mentions that he and Troy agreed that friends never lie to each other is a reference to episode 5 of season 1, when Troy was "messing" with Abed.

A portion of "The Lonely Man," the theme from the television series The Incredible Hulk, is heard when Jeff wakes up shirtless on the side of the road after being shot with a tranquilizer dart for "Hulking out" at the party.

Chang's militaristic speech during the credits mostly parodies a scene from the film Patton, but his arm gestures resemble those of Adolf Hitler.

== Reception ==
The episode was watched by 3.87 million American viewers with a 1.7/6 rating/share among adults 18-49, placing third in its timeslot.
