= Regional Holiday Music =

- Community episode
- Episode no.: Season 3 Episode 10
- Directed by: Tristram Shapeero
- Written by: Steve Basilone; Annie Mebane
- Production code: 311
- Original air date: December 8, 2011

Guest appearances
- Taran Killam as Cory Radison; Richard Erdman as Leonard; Dino Stamatopoulos as Star-Burns; Luke Youngblood as Magnitude; Danielle Kaplowitz as Vicki; Jeff Hiller as Glee Club Guy

Episode chronology
← Previous "Foosball and Nocturnal Vigilantism"	Next → "Urban Matrimony and the Sandwich Arts"
- Community season 3

"Regional Holiday Music" is the tenth episode and mid-season finale of the third season of the American television series Community, and 59th overall episode of the series. It was originally broadcast on December 8, 2011 on NBC and is the final episode before the show went on hiatus during the 2011–12 midseason. The Christmas-themed episode is a musical featuring original songs performed by cast members. After Greendale's glee club members become incapacitated, the study group is asked to join. Despite their dislike of the club, each of them is lured into joining after their vulnerabilities are exploited.

The episode was directed by Tristram Shapeero and written by Steve Basilone and Annie Mebane. The musical format, along with other more subtle elements in the episode is a parody of the Fox television series Glee. Creator Dan Harmon had been known to dislike Glee and the series had satirized aspects of the musical series in previous episodes. The characters performing as a glee club had been referenced in season 2's "Paradigms of Human Memory". Taran Killam guest-starred as the glee club instructor.

The episode received mostly positive reviews, with many critics disagreeing with NBC's decision to bench the series. Critics praised the episode's high-concept satire and character-driven moments. Opinion was divided on the quality of the original songs. According to Nielsen Media Research, "Regional Holiday Music" was seen by an estimated 3.6 million viewers, a drop from the previous week.

== Plot ==
In the cafeteria, Abed (Danny Pudi) is disappointed the group plan to spend Christmas away from Greendale, while he wants to watch a critically reviled Inspector Spacetime holiday special with them. Their conversation is interrupted by a performance by the obnoxious Greendale glee club. Midway through, Chang (Ken Jeong) stops them with a cease and desist order from ASCAP—tipped off by Jeff (Joel McHale)—for performing copyrighted music without permission. The glee club members suffer a nervous breakdown and are taken to the hospital.

The glee club instructor, Cory "Mr. Rad" Radison (Taran Killam), invites the study group to join and perform the Christmas pageant but is immediately rebuffed. However, through a series of events performed as songs, the group are lured into joining one by one.

1. "Glee": Mr. Rad manages to convince Abed to join by channeling his desire to spend Christmas with the group.
2. "Jehovah's Secret Witness": As Jehovah's Witnesses do not celebrate Christmas, Troy (Donald Glover) and Abed rap about infiltrating the glee club and Santa's operation to stop Christmas from within.
3. "Baby Boomer Santa": Troy and Abed exploit Pierce's (Chevy Chase) baby boomer narcissism using mixed musical styles associated with each of the decades Pierce has lived through.
4. "Teach Me How to Understand Christmas": Annie (Alison Brie) is cornered by Troy, Abed, and Mr. Rad. She then dresses up in a sexy Santa outfit to seduce Jeff.
5. "Happy Birthday Jesus": Pierce invites a children's choir to sing to Shirley about how the public school system has thrown out the meaning of Christmas (the birth of Jesus). Unable to resist her religious fervor, Shirley springs into song.

Finally, Britta (Gillian Jacobs) comes across Jeff, who screams out melodically as she realizes the others are all part of the club.

As they are backstage at the Christmas pageant, Mr. Rad tells Abed about his plans to take the group to "Regionals" and many further glee competitions. As Abed had only made the group join to brighten up Christmas, he decides to sabotage the pageant. While the group performs "Planet Christmas" on stage, he asks Britta (who was originally cast as the mute tree) to replace him as the Mouse King. Her poor improvised song makes Mr. Rad object. However, Dean Pelton (Jim Rash) and the audience agree to let Britta perform in the spirit of inclusion. Mr. Rad inadvertently reveals that he killed a previous glee club by orchestrating a bus crash, then runs off.

Back at the apartment, Abed is watching Inspector Spacetime alone. The rest of the group arrive, singing "The First Noel", and announce that they want to spend the holidays together. They watch Inspector Spacetime together.

The end tag shows recurring characters' faces as baubles on a Christmas tree—the Dean, Chang, Magnitude (Luke Youngblood), Starburns (Dino Stamatopoulos) and Leonard (Richard Erdman). They make different sounds to the tune of "Carol of the Bells".

== Production ==
I think that's the theme -- after last year, we know that Abed has this affinity for bringing everybody together on Christmas. He sees it as one of those moments to kind of capture the feeling of family and meaning. Especially with his family situation kind of going off the tracks last year, this year the family truly is his Greendale buddies.

— Danny Pudi

"Regional Holiday Music" was written by Steve Basilone and Annie Mebane, both their debut writing credits for the series. It was directed by Tristram Shapeero, his seventh directing credit. The music for the episode was composed by series composer Ludwig Göransson, with lyrics by the writing staff. The episode took six days to shoot, which Danny Pudi said is one of the longest for a single episode.

"Regional Holiday Music" was the mid-season finale. The second half of the third season was indefinitely delayed in November 2011, with 30 Rock airing in its timeslot instead. As with the show's uncertain future after season 2, fans expressed outrage on social media, using the hashtag #sixseasonsandamovie in reference to "Paradigms of Human Memory". In February 2012 it was announced that the show would resume. "Urban Matrimony and the Sandwich Arts" aired in the show's original timeslot on March 15, 2012.

Taran Killam, a cast member of Saturday Night Live, guest starred as glee club instructor Cory Radison. Killam previously worked with Community executive producers Neil Goldman and Garrett Donovan in the pilot of Nobody's Watching. The show was not picked up.

Series creator Dan Harmon had long been known to dislike Glee. Community has parodied the musical television series in previous episodes. In "Modern Warfare", the show referenced Glee's lack of original music. In "Paradigms of Human Memory", the study group fills in for the glee club members who died in a bus crash, though they sing a song with no real lyrics. These events are brought up during "Regional Holiday Music", where Mr. Rad is revealed to have caused the crash.

Following the footsteps of season 2's "Abed's Uncontrollable Christmas", Abed spends the episode trying to get the group to embrace the holiday spirit during Christmas.

== Cultural references ==
"Regional Holiday Music" is a satire-at-large of the television series Glee. The audio transitions for this episode mimic the a cappella audio transitions featured in Glee, whilst the glee club instructor Cory Radison ("Mr. Rad") shares many similarities to Will Schuester ("Mr. Schue"). Unlike most songs on Glee, the music on "Regional Holiday Music" is entirely original.

Jeff remarks in a scene that not liking the glee club does not make the group bullies, in reference to Glee creator Ryan Murphy's criticism of musicians who do not want their music on the show. When Mr. Rad reveals that he killed previous glee club members, he shouts "Look, Kings of Leon!" to distract the audience before escaping. Kings of Leon had previously clashed with Murphy over permission to use their songs on Glee.

The song "Glee" speaks about the namesake series' characters' tendency to sing their feelings instead of "making a face". While performing "Baby Boomer Santa", Troy and Abed recreate musical styles from the 1940s to 1980s, including performing "Dancing in the Dark" and Troy impersonating Bob Dylan.

The episode continues the show's recurring spoof of the British television series Doctor Who through Inspector Spacetime, while also making a nod to the infamous 1978 Star Wars Holiday Special. While the group discusses their Christmas plans, Annie reveals she will spend time with her bubbe (the Yiddish word for grandmother), which Troy confuses for "boobie" (breast). The scene where Britta discovers that Jeff has been turned is a spoof of the ending of the 1978 remake of Invasion of the Body Snatchers.

== Reception ==
=== Ratings ===
In its original American broadcast, "Regional Holiday Music" was viewed by an estimated 3.6 million households, with a Nielsen rating/share of 1.5/4 in the 18–49 demographic. It finished fourth in its 8 pm time slot among broadcast networks and was outperformed by CBS sitcom The Big Bang Theory, which was seen by 14.4 million households; Fox reality show The X Factor, which was seen by 9.9 million households; and a special holiday episode of ABC reality show Wipeout, which was seen by 6.6 million households. The episode outperformed a repeat airing of The Vampire Diaries on The CW, which was seen by 1.2 million households. Community was NBC's lowest performing show of the night in the demographic despite The Office, Parks and Recreation and Whitney all slipping to season lows.

=== Reviews ===
"Regional Holiday Music" received mostly positive reviews from critics, many of whom pleaded for the show to return. BuddyTV placed it #17 in its list of 50 best TV episodes of 2011, calling the songs the "best original songs TV has heard in a long time".

Emily VanDerWerff of The A.V. Club gave the episode an 'A', saying "Community is going away for a while, but it's going away with an episode that reminds me why I love the show so much. This is a very personal thing—since humor's subjective like that—but for me, this was the funniest episode since the clip show... I laughed myself silly at this one, to the point where I was devolving into hiccups at certain scenes, and I'm glad we get to go out on an episode like this, one that plays around with form and makes me laugh." Alan Sepinwall of HitFix also praised the Glee-spoofing, saying "'Regional Holiday Music' was the logical, clever, funny endpoint to it." Sean Gandert of Paste said, "As with its best theme-episodes, the show bridged the gap between high-concept parody and character-based comedy." TV Fanatic's Leigh Raines gave the episode a 4/5 rating, saying while the show "definitely went out with a bang, it didn't totally blow my socks off... While there were a few moments that upped the ick factor, overall this episode fell on the positive side." She praised Troy and Abed's rap performance, but called the scene where Annie seduces Jeff "creepy". Robert Canning of IGN said it was a "great" episode, but "faltered just a bit" at the end: "Abed's realization that his attempts to brighten the holiday only made things darker, as Jeff had previously suggested, fit the character well enough, but the study group's follow-up felt a bit forced and holiday hokey. Of course, that could well have been the point."

Kelsea Stahler of Hollywood.com gave the episode a bad review, calling the original songs "terrible". She remarked, "fans merit a better episode, better commentary, and better parody of the subject at hand." Nonetheless, she praised the episode's ending and asked, "Who cares that the story was a bit weak this time around? It's the last episode we have before the dreaded undetermined hiatus gets underway, and it's Christmas. Let's just cherish the episode for what it is..." Sean Campbell said although he enjoyed the episode's concept, "the execution left much to be desired" and that the quality of the songs "varied from okay to bad".

The Atlantic's Kevin Fallon compared "Regional Holiday Music" to Glee's own 2011 Christmas episode "Extraordinary Merry Christmas" which aired on December 13. Fallon said "Regional Holiday Music" "relentlessly exposed Glee's most repetitive cliches" and "couldn't have invented better illustrations of Glee's cringe-inducing, everyone-is-loved-as-long-as-they-sing-a-song motif." However, on a final note, he highlighted the two shows' similarities, explaining how both shows stick to their bold delivery and heartwarming moments.
