= List of awards and nominations received by Community =

Awards and nominations received by Community
Awards and nominations
Award	Wins	Nominations
Annie Awards	0	1
Art Directors Guild Awards	0	2
Artios Awards	0	2
Banff Rockie Awards	0	3
The Comedy Awards	0	1
Critics' Choice Television Awards	1	10
EWwy Awards	5	15
Gracie Awards	1	1
Hollywood Post Alliance Awards	0	1
Hugo Awards	0	1
NAACP Image Awards	0	3
People's Choice Awards	0	2
Primetime Emmy Awards	1	4
Satellite Awards	1	6
Teen Choice Awards	0	2
Television Critics Association Awards	0	3
TV Guide Fan Favorite Awards	2	2
Young Artist Awards	0	1

Totals (Note: Certain award groups do not simply award one winner. They acknowledge several different recipients, have runners-up, and have third place. Since this is a specific recognition and is different from losing an award, runner-up mentions are considered wins in this award tally. For simplification and to avoid errors, each award in this list has been presumed to have had a prior nomination.)
- Wins: 11
- Nominations: 60

Community is an American television sitcom created by Dan Harmon. The show ran for six seasons and 110 episodes, with its first five seasons airing on NBC from September 17, 2009, to April 17, 2014, and the final season airing on Yahoo! Screen from March 17 to June 2, 2015. Set at Greendale Community College, the series stars an ensemble cast playing members of a diverse study group. The main cast includes Joel McHale as Jeff Winger, Gillian Jacobs as Britta Perry, Danny Pudi as Abed Nadir, Yvette Nicole Brown as Shirley Bennett, Alison Brie as Annie Edison, Donald Glover as Troy Barnes, Ken Jeong as Ben Chang, Chevy Chase as Pierce Hawthorne, and Jim Rash as Dean Craig Pelton. A comedy about friendships and relationships, the show uses frequent pop culture references and meta-humor, as well as high-concept episodes including documentary spoofs, action movie homages and storylines inspired by movies.

Despite being critically acclaimed (Note: Season-by-season reception: Season 1 holds a 90% approval rating on Rotten Tomatoes and a score of 69 on Metacritic.; Season 2 holds a 100% approval rating on Rotten Tomatoes.; Season 3 holds a 91% approval rating on Rotten Tomatoes.; Season 4 holds a 65% approval rating on Rotten Tomatoes and a score of 69 on Metacritic.; Season 5 holds a 93% approval rating on Rotten Tomatoes and a score of 80 on Metacritic.; Season 6 holds an 89% approval rating on Rotten Tomatoes.) and gaining a cult following, the show faced production issues and repeatedly came close to cancellation. The third season was subject to a mid-season replacement, its second half airing months later than originally planned. Harmon was fired as showrunner for the fourth season, though he was rehired by the fifth season. The end of the fourth season and middle of the fifth season saw the departures of Chase (Note: Chase appears in the first episode of the fifth season in a short cameo.) and Glover, respectively. The show was cancelled by NBC and moved to Yahoo! Screen for its sixth and final season, which also saw the departure of Brown. Community was effectively cancelled when Yahoo! Screen shut down in 2016.

Over the course of its run, the series was nominated for many awards, including four Primetime Emmy Awards (winning one), ten Critics' Choice Television Awards (winning one), and six Satellite Awards (winning one). Among the main cast, McHale and Pudi were the most nominated individuals with seven nominations each; McHale won two awards and Pudi won one. Several episodes, including "Introduction to Statistics", "Modern Warfare", "Abed's Uncontrollable Christmas", and "Remedial Chaos Theory", received individual nominations for awards. Some commentators have considered the show's relative lack of awards recognition at the Emmys to be a snub.

== Awards and nominations ==
Awards and nominations received by Community
Award	Year	Category	Nominee(s)	Result	Ref.
Annie Awards	2012	Directing in a Television Production	Duke Johnson	Nominated	
ADG Excellence in Production Design Awards	2011	Episode of a Half Hour Single-Camera Television Series	Derek R. Hill (production designer), Robert W. Joseph (assistant art director), Denise Pizzini (set decorator) (for "Basic Rocket Science")	Nominated	
ADG Excellence in Production Design Awards	2013	Episode of a Half Hour Single-Camera Television Series	Denise Pizzini (production designer), John B. Vertrees (art director), Ellen King (graphic designer), Don Diers (set decorator) (for "Pillows and Blankets")	Nominated	
Artios Awards	2010	Outstanding Achievement in Comedy Pilot Casting	Dava Waite (casting director)	Nominated	
Artios Awards	2011	Outstanding Achievement in Comedy Television Series Casting	Dava Waite (casting director)	Nominated	
Banff Rockie Awards	2011	Best Sitcom	Community (Note: The episode "Modern Warfare" was submitted for the show's nomination.)	Nominated	
Banff Rockie Awards	2012	Best Sitcom	Community	Nominated	
Banff Rockie Awards	2013	Best Sitcom	Community (Note: The episode "Basic Lupine Urology" was submitted for the show's nomination.)	Nominated	
The Comedy Awards	2011	Best Directing for a Comedy Series	Community	Nominated	
Critics' Choice Television Awards	2011	Best Comedy Series	Community	Nominated	
Critics' Choice Television Awards	2011	Best Actor in a Comedy Series	Joel McHale	Nominated	
Critics' Choice Television Awards	2011	Best Supporting Actor in a Comedy Series	Danny Pudi	Nominated	
Critics' Choice Television Awards	2012	Best Comedy Series	Community	Won	
Critics' Choice Television Awards	2012	Best Actor in a Comedy Series	Joel McHale	Nominated	
Critics' Choice Television Awards	2012	Best Supporting Actor in a Comedy Series	Danny Pudi	Nominated	
Critics' Choice Television Awards	2012	Best Supporting Actor in a Comedy Series	Jim Rash	Nominated	
Critics' Choice Television Awards	2012	Best Supporting Actress in a Comedy Series	Alison Brie	Nominated	
Critics' Choice Television Awards	2012	Best Supporting Actress in a Comedy Series	Gillian Jacobs	Nominated	
Critics' Choice Television Awards	2013	Best Supporting Actor in a Comedy Series	Danny Pudi	Nominated	
EWwy Awards	2010	Best Comedy Series	Community	Nominated	
EWwy Awards	2010	Best Lead Actor in a Comedy	Joel McHale	Nominated	
EWwy Awards	2010	Best Supporting Actor in a Comedy	Danny Pudi	Nominated	
EWwy Awards	2011	Best Comedy Series	Community	Nominated	
EWwy Awards	2011	Best Actor in a Comedy	Joel McHale	Won	
EWwy Awards	2011	Best Supporting Actor in a Comedy	Danny Pudi	Nominated	
EWwy Awards	2011	Best Supporting Actress in a Comedy	Alison Brie	Nominated	
EWwy Awards	2012	Best Comedy Series	Community	Won	
EWwy Awards	2012	Best Actor in a Comedy	Joel McHale	Won	
EWwy Awards	2012	Best Supporting Actor in a Comedy	Danny Pudi	Won	
EWwy Awards	2012	Best Supporting Actor in a Comedy	Donald Glover	Nominated	
EWwy Awards	2012	Best Supporting Actress in a Comedy	Alison Brie	Won	
EWwy Awards	2012	Best Supporting Actress in a Comedy	Gillian Jacobs	Nominated	
EWwy Awards	2014	Best Guest Actor in a Comedy	Jonathan Banks	Nominated	
EWwy Awards	2014	Best Guest Actor in a Comedy	Walton Goggins	Nominated	
Gracie Awards	2011	Outstanding Supporting Actress in a Comedy Series	Yvette Nicole Brown	Won	
Hollywood Post Alliance Awards	2011	Outstanding Editing – Television	Steven Sprung and Peter B. Ellis (for "A Fistful of Paintballs")	Nominated	
Hugo Awards	2012	Best Dramatic Presentation, Short Form	Dan Harmon and Chris McKenna (writers), Jeff Melman (director) (for "Remedial Chaos Theory")	Nominated	
NAACP Image Awards	2010	Outstanding Directing in a Comedy Series	Justin Lin (for "Introduction to Statistics")	Nominated	
NAACP Image Awards	2011	Outstanding Directing in a Comedy Series	Justin Lin (for "Modern Warfare")	Nominated	
NAACP Image Awards	2013	Outstanding Supporting Actor in a Comedy Series	Donald Glover	Nominated	
People's Choice Awards	2010	Favorite New TV Comedy	Community	Nominated	
People's Choice Awards	2011	Favorite TV Guest Star	Betty White	Nominated	
Primetime Emmy Awards	2011	Outstanding Individual Achievement in Animation (Note: Award presented at the Primetime Creative Arts Emmy Awards)	Drew Hodges (for "Abed's Uncontrollable Christmas")	Won (Note: This category is juried; there are no nominations and only winners are announced.)	
Primetime Emmy Awards	2012	Outstanding Writing for a Comedy Series	Chris McKenna (for "Remedial Chaos Theory")	Nominated	
Primetime Emmy Awards	2014	Outstanding Stunt Coordination for a Comedy Series or a Variety Program	Casey Charles O'Neill	Nominated	
Primetime Emmy Awards	2015	Outstanding Stunt Coordination for a Comedy Series or a Variety Program	Ben Scott	Nominated	
Satellite Awards	2011	Best Television Series – Comedy or Musical	Community	Nominated	
Satellite Awards	2011	Best Actor in a Series – Comedy or Musical	Joel McHale	Nominated	
Satellite Awards	2011	Best Actor in a Supporting Role in a Series, Miniseries, or Television Film	Donald Glover	Nominated	
Satellite Awards	2011	Best Television Release	Community: The Complete Second Season	Won	
Satellite Awards	2012	Best Television Series – Comedy or Musical	Community	Nominated	
Satellite Awards	2012	Best Actor in a Series – Comedy or Musical	Joel McHale	Nominated	
Teen Choice Awards	2010	Choice TV: Breakout Show	Community	Nominated	
Teen Choice Awards	2010	Choice TV: Male Breakout Star	Ken Jeong	Nominated	
Television Critics Association Awards	2011	Outstanding Achievement in Comedy	Community	Nominated	
Television Critics Association Awards	2011	Individual Achievement in Comedy	Danny Pudi	Nominated	
Television Critics Association Awards	2012	Outstanding Achievement in Comedy	Community	Nominated	
TV Guide Fan Favorite Awards	2012	Favorite Comedy Series	Community	Won	
TV Guide Fan Favorite Awards	2012	Favorite Ensemble	Community	Won	
Young Artist Awards	2011	Best Performance in a TV Series – Guest Starring Young Actor 14–17	Brandon Soo Hoo	Nominated	
