= Gemma Chan =

British Chinese actress (born 1982)

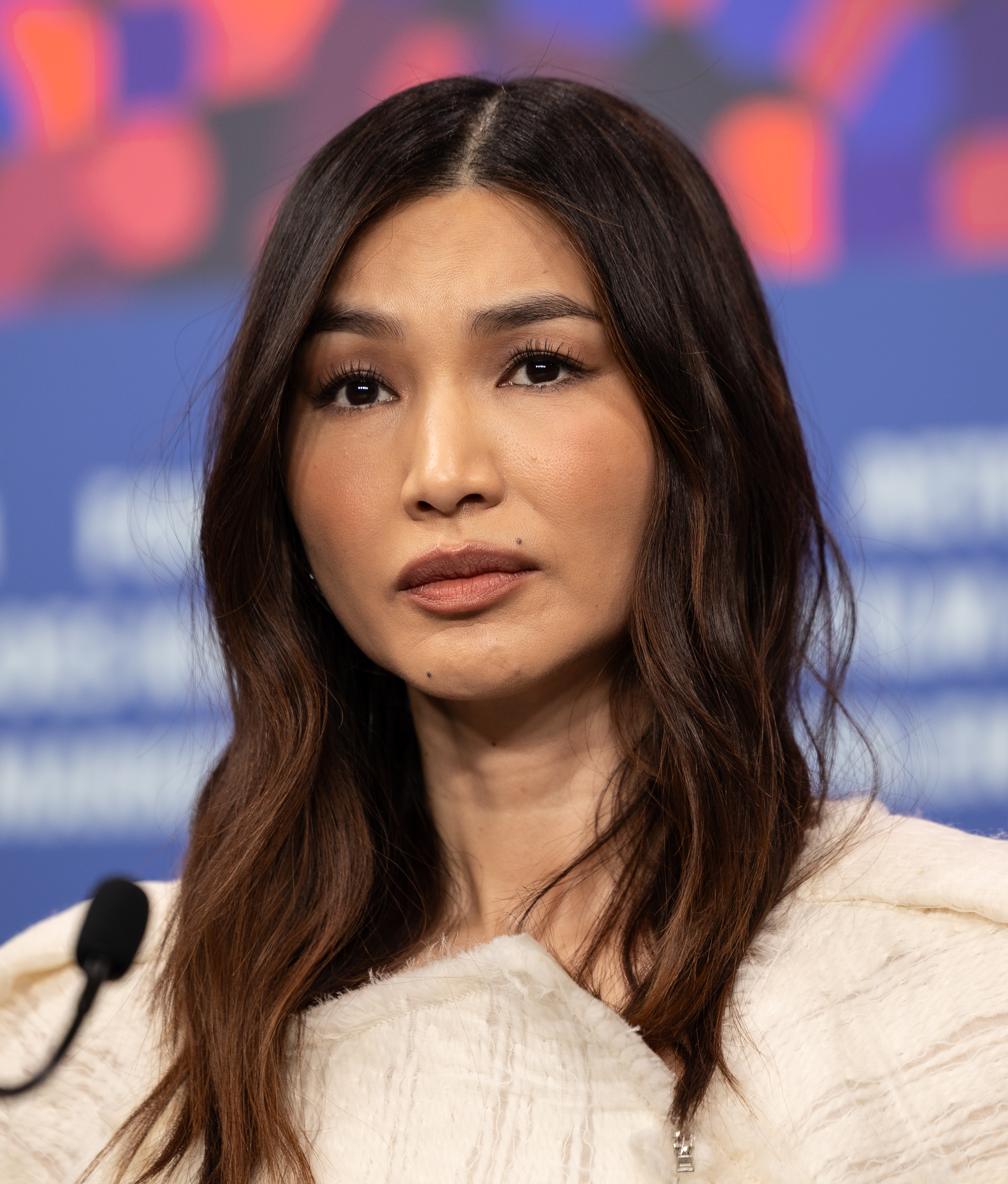
- Chan in 2026
- Born: 29 November 1982 (age 43); London, England
- Education: Worcester College, Oxford (BA)
- Occupation: Actress
- Years active: 2006–present
- Partners: Jack Whitehall (2011–2017); Dominic Cooper (2018–present)
- Awards: Full list

Chinese name
- Traditional Chinese: 陳靜
- Simplified Chinese: 陈静
Transcriptions
Standard Mandarin
- Hanyu Pinyin: Chén Jìng
Yue: Cantonese
- Yale Romanization: Chàhn Jihng
- Jyutping: Can^{4} Zing^{6}

Gemma Chan (born 29 November 1982) is a British actress and model. A graduate of Worcester College, Oxford, Chan began acting during the late 2000s, making her film debut in 2009. She rose to attention with her lead role in the Channel 4 science fiction series Humans (2015–2018), and gained prominence with her starring film roles as Astrid Leong in Crazy Rich Asians and as Elizabeth Hardwick in Mary Queen of Scots (both 2018).

Chan next appeared in the Marvel Cinematic Universe films Captain Marvel (2019) and Eternals (2021), portraying Minn-Erva and Sersi, respectively. She also appeared in Olivia Wilde's psychological thriller Don't Worry Darling (2022) and Gareth Edwards' science fiction film The Creator (2023). She had a voice role in the Disney animated film Raya and the Last Dragon (2021). Offscreen, Chan has been labelled a fashion icon.

== Early life and education ==
Chan was born at Guy's Hospital in Southwark, South East London. Her father was an engineer who grew up in Hong Kong and her mother was a pharmacist raised in Greenock, Scotland after her parents had emigrated from Hong Kong. She speaks basic Cantonese.

Raised in the suburb of Locksbottom in the London Borough of Bromley, Chan attended Newstead Wood School for Girls in Orpington, London. She went on to graduate with a degree in law from Worcester College, Oxford. Following graduation, Chan gained a training contract offer as a graduate at the law firm Slaughter and May, but turned it down to train at the Drama Centre London and pursue an acting career.

== Career ==
=== Early career (2000s) ===
Chan made her professional debut in the 2006 Horror Channel miniseries When Evil Calls. She was one of the models on the first series of the Sky One reality series Project Catwalk. Chan made her stage debut in the British premiere of Bertolt Brecht's final play Turandot at the Hampstead Theatre, London in 2008. Chan made a guest appearance in the autumn 2009 special of Doctor Who on BBC One titled "The Waters of Mars", playing geologist Mia Bennett. The episode later won a Hugo Award. In the same year, Chan starred in the psychological thriller Exam, which premiered at the Edinburgh International Film Festival to mixed reviews.

=== Rise to prominence (2010s) ===
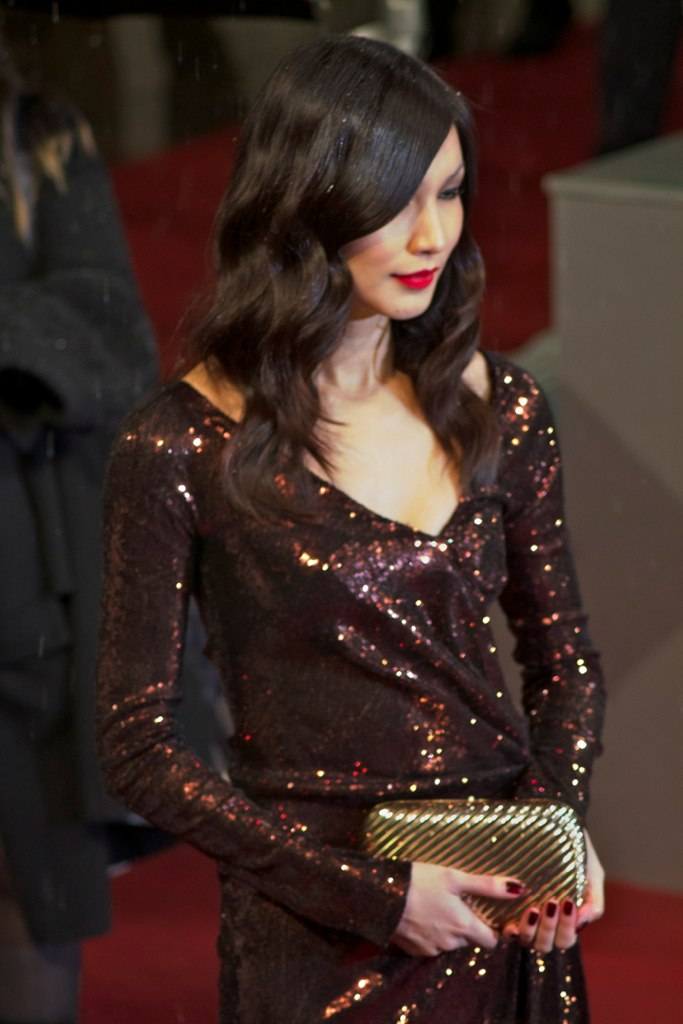
Chan at the 2013 BAFTA Awards

At the start of 2010, Chan appeared in two episodes in the Channel 4 sitcom The IT Crowd She played a heavily accented Chinese immigrant named Soo Lin Yao in The Blind Banker, a first series episode of BBC One series Sherlock. The episode was criticised partly because of its orientalist clichés. Chan had roles in three films that year: Pimp as Bo, Shanghai as Shin Shin, and Richard Ayoade's Submarine as Kim-Lin. The latter premiered at the 35th Toronto International Film Festival to positive reviews.

Chan joined the main cast of the ITV2 drama Secret Diary of a Call Girl for its fourth and final series as Charlotte, the rival of Billie Piper's character. The series aired on ITV2 in 2011. Later that year, she appeared in the Channel 4 comedy Fresh Meat and made a film for Amnesty International to celebrate the 60th anniversary of the Universal Declaration of Human Rights.

In 2012, Chan played Kiera in the second series of the Sky Living supernatural series Bedlam and Kathy in the semi-improvised BBC One miniseries True Love. She starred in the British premiere of David Henry Hwang's play Yellow Face at The Park Theatre, London. Chan returned for its 2014 revival at the Royal National Theatre. While promoting the play, Chan spoke about her struggles to get cast in non Chinese-related productions and period dramas due to her ethnicity.

In November 2013, Chan performed in the world premiere of Our Ajax by Timberlake Wertenbaker at the Southwark Playhouse, London. Michael Billington of The Guardian described her performance as "beautifully svelte omniscience". Later that year, she featured in the first series of the BBC Scotland crime drama Shetland as Hattie James, and guest-starred in episodes of Death in Paradise on BBC One and the Channel 4 romantic drama Dates. Chan appeared in the film The Double (2013), which premiered at the 2013 Toronto International Film Festival to critical success.

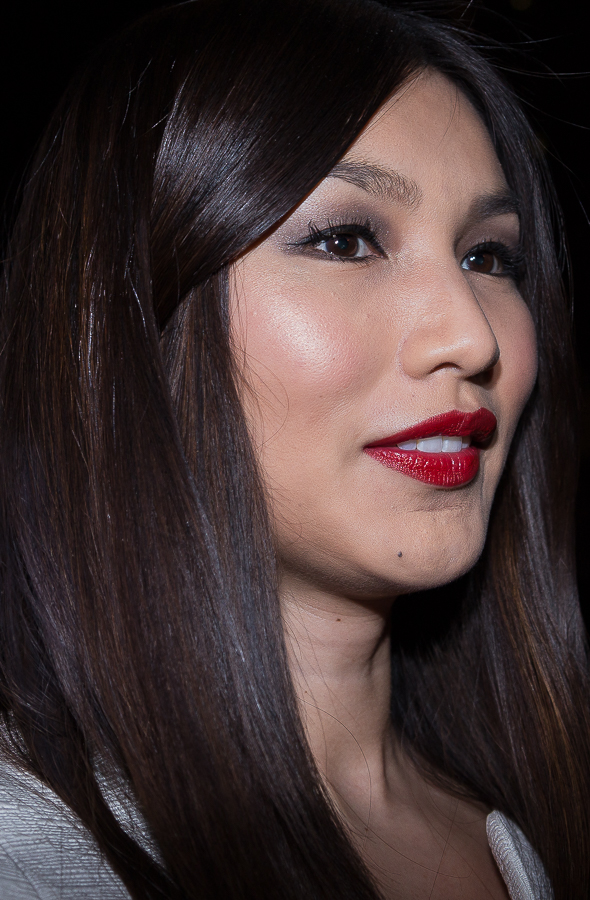
Chan at the British Independent Film Awards 2014

Chan appeared in the action-thriller Jack Ryan: Shadow Recruit (2014), which met mixed reception but financial success. In 2015 she portrayed Ruth in the West End revival of Harold Pinter's domestic drama The Homecoming directed by Jamie Lloyd. She received rave reviews with Michael Billington of The Guardian writing, that "Chan shows, with great skill...a coolly inscrutable Ruth". The Evening Standard described Chan's performance as "cool" and "elegant". Chan said of the experience "There is a lot of ambiguity with [my] character and in [Pinter's] text, but as you work on it you have to make choices and decide what your truth is... A lot of people think she's controversial and ask why she behaves the way she behaves, and it's been really interesting trying to work that out."

That same year she portrayed the protagonist's girlfriend, Chen-Lin, in French comedy-drama Belles Familles (2015), which was released at the 2015 Toronto International Film Festival.. Chan starred as the anthropomorphic robot Anita/Mia in Humans, an AMC/Channel 4 science-fiction drama, from 2015 to 2018. The A.V. Club wrote that Chan "anchors the series", with her performance "awakening in ways both subtle and overt ... to reflect every new emotion." Chan voiced robot Quintessa in Transformers: The Last Knight (2017), which was panned by critics. Chan starred in action-thriller Stratton (2017) as the titular character's "smart-girl" colleague, Aggie. In 2018, Chan joined Andrea Riseborough, Jane Horrocks, Jaime Winstone, and Laura Carmichael to star in a film produced by ActionAid, encouraging the British public to support girls at risk of sexual violence. She lent her voice to the BBC One animated miniseries Watership Down in 2018.

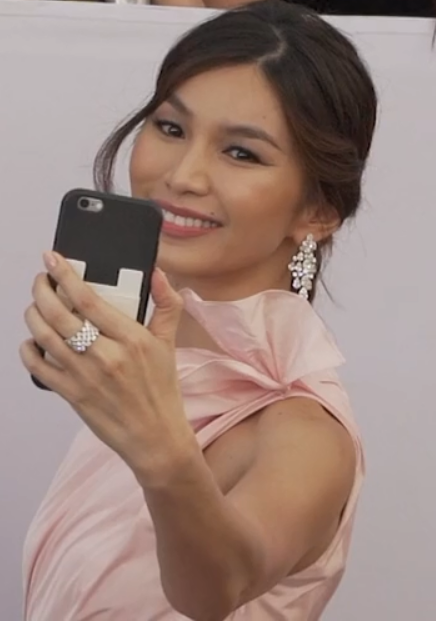
Chan at the 2019 Screen Actors Guild Awards

Also in 2018, Chan co-starred as Astrid Leong-Teo in the film Crazy Rich Asians. Originally asked to portray the lead, Chan preferred the "more intriguing" role of Astrid. She first heard about the novel Crazy Rich Asians in a text message from her sister, read it on holiday, and "fell in love with Astrid". On her role, Chan stated that "what you see with Astrid is not necessarily what you get. There are layers to her ... [she] seemingly has it all together. The film became the highest-grossing romantic comedy of the decade and received critical acclaim for its cast, visuals and on-screen representation. The Hollywood Reporter lauded Chan as "a radiant presence who lights up her every scene".

That same year, she featured in the short film titled Leading Lady Parts in support of the Time's Up movement. Chan appeared as Petronella in London Fields (2018), which was a box-office bomb. Chan portrayed Elizabeth Hardwick in Josie Rourke's directorial debut, historical drama Mary Queen of Scots (2018), which premiered at the AFI Fest. Chan's casting "provoked controversy among internet trolls", as her character had been a white woman. Chan responded that "if John Wayne can play Genghis Khan, I can play Bess of Hardwick" and remarked that "art should reflect life now." Chan appeared in Captain Marvel (2019) in a supporting role as Minn-Erva, a sniper who is part of the Kree Starforce. The role required an extensive amount of prosthetic makeup, described as "four layers of airbrush paint" that took four hours to apply. The film had the sixth-biggest opening of all time to critical success. That same year, she was one of fifteen women selected to appear on the cover of the September 2019 issue of British Vogue, by guest editor Meghan, Duchess of Sussex.

=== Established career (2020s) ===
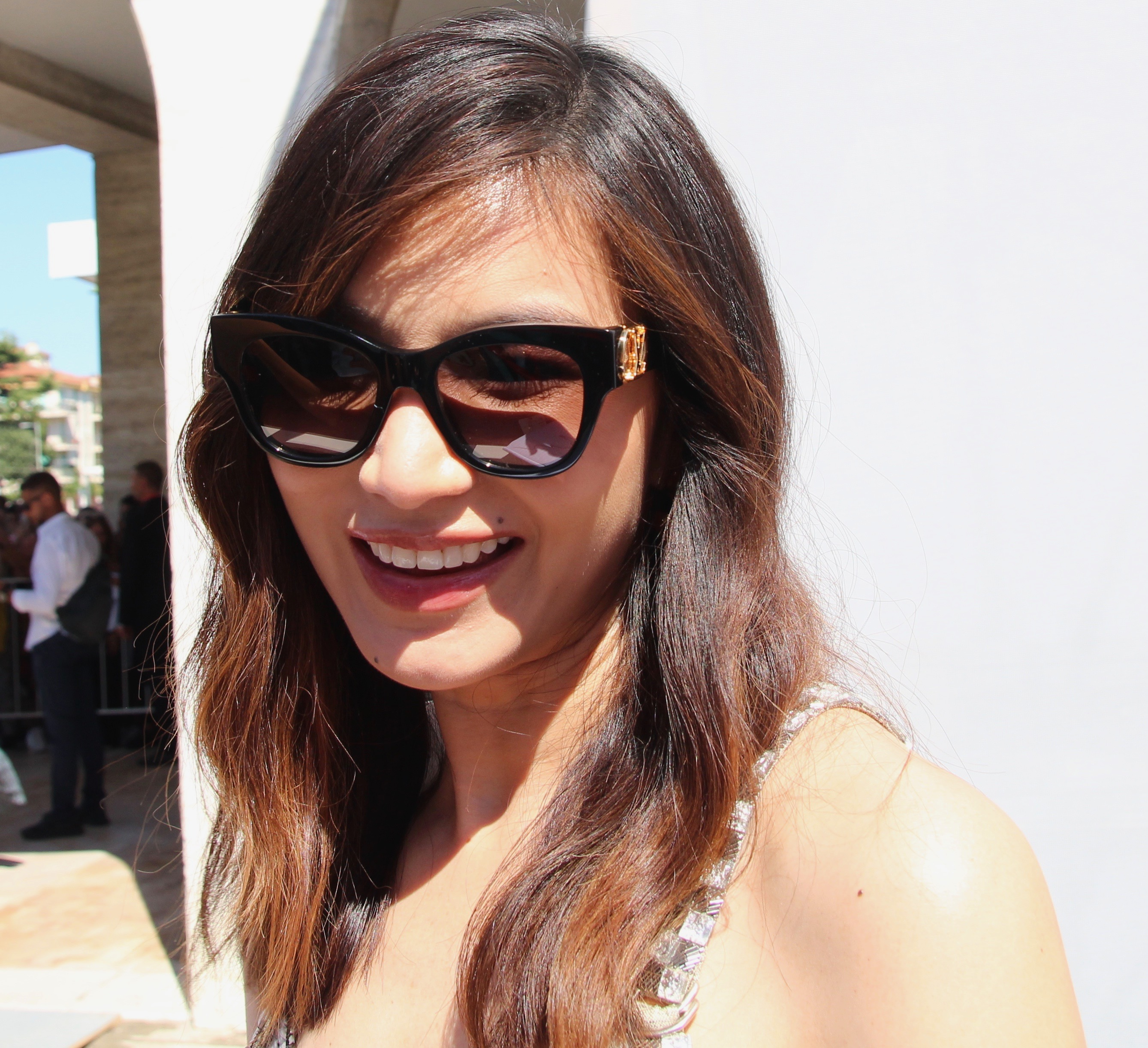
Chan at the premiere of Don't Worry Darling in 2022

In 2020 Chan starred alongside Meryl Streep in Steven Soderbergh's comedy Let Them All Talk. She portrayed Karen, a literary agent who has a "maybe-romance" with her client's nephew. The film premiered on HBO Max to positive reception. That same year, Chan was the fifteenth recipient of the Women In Film Max Mara Face of the Future award, given for her "distinguished acting achievements" and "personal embodiment of timeless style and grace". Chan voiced the warrior princess Namaari, the antagonist of the Disney animated film Raya and the Last Dragon, which premiered in March 2021. The film was received positively by critics. That May, she briefly produced Hold Still, Vincent, a podcast about the 1982 murder of Vincent Chin. It was subsequently pulled from distribution by the producing team after it was revealed that the podcast's production company did not consult with Chin's estate during the project. November 2021 saw the release of the Marvel Studios film Eternals, in which she starred as Sersi, a member of the titular race. This was her second role in the Marvel Cinematic Universe after Captain Marvel (2019).

Chan appeared in the Apple TV+ anthology series Extrapolations. Chan had a voice role in the English dub version of Hayao Miyazaki's Japanese animated film The Boy and the Heron (2023). Chan appears in psychological thriller Don't Worry Darling directed by Olivia Wilde and appears in science fiction film The Creator directed by Gareth Edwards.

Chan starred in Duke Johnson's 2025 film The Actor, based on the novel Memory by Donald E. Westlake.

== Advocacy and activism ==
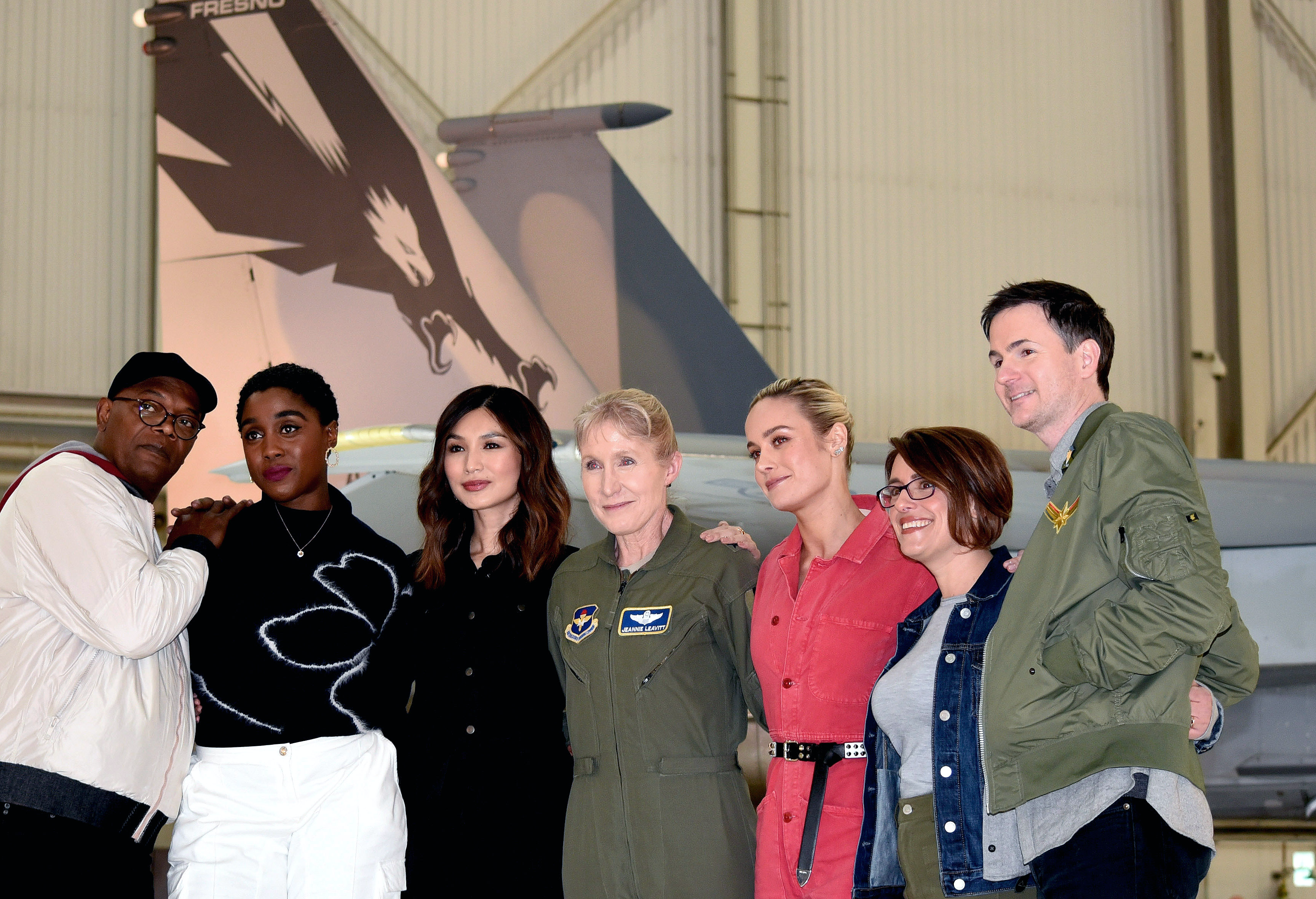
Chan (third from left) at Edwards Air Force Base alongside her Captain Marvel costars

Chan travelled with Save the Children to Lebanon to meet Syrian child refugees in 2017. In 2018 she partnered with Moet to support Help Refugees UK. She volunteered for Cook-19, an organisation that delivers meals to key workers, during the COVID-19 pandemic. Chan has supported UNICEF UK since 2015 and travelled to Jamaica to raise awareness of domestic violence with the organisation in 2019. She participated in Soccer Aid to raise funds for the charity in 2019. She participated in World Children's Day commemorations in 2020. She was appointed a celebrity ambassador for UNICEF UK in 2021.

In response to the xenophobic and racist attacks against people of East and Southeast Asian descent during the COVID-19 pandemic, Chan advocated for the #StopAAPIhate movement and fundraising campaign. In May 2021 Chan launched the #StopESEAHate campaign to assist people of East and Southeast Asian descent who are victims of hate crimes.

== Public image and fashion ==
Labelled a fashion icon, Chan is recognised for her "polished and flawless" style. Her old Hollywood style and red carpet fashion choices have been widely publicised.

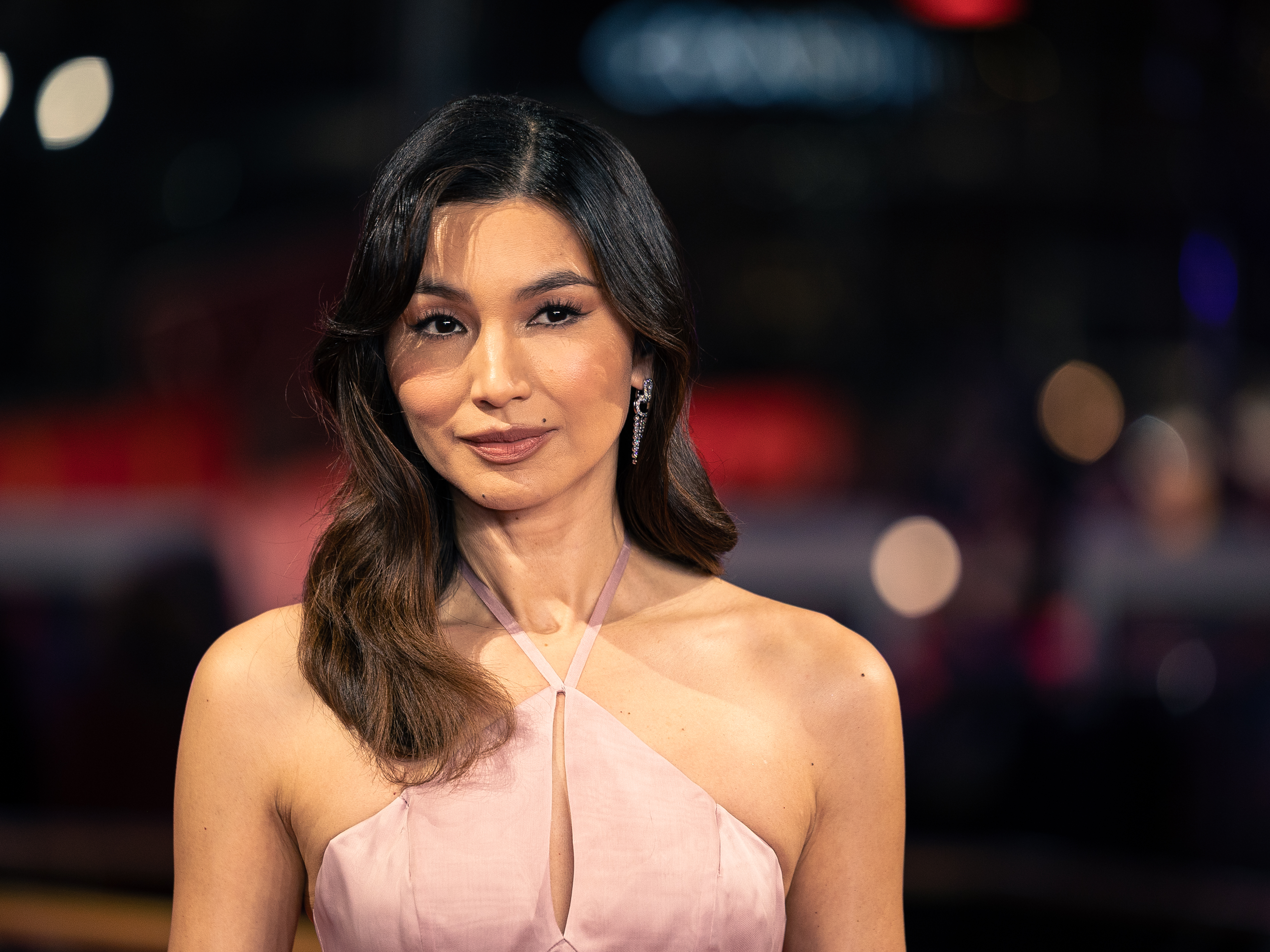
Chan at the 2026 Berlin International Film Festival

The 2018 comedy Crazy Rich Asians brought Chan to international attention. The following year, she attended the 91st Academy Awards wearing a fuchsia pink Valentino dress, which gained significant media attention and praise from critics. Harper's Bazaar described the look as "parachute-like" and praised it as "an Oscars red carpet triumph". Chan was named in best-dressed rankings by multiple publications, including Harper's Bazaar, Town & Country, and Vogue. For Vogue, Alice Birell wrote, "The designer of the moment, the colour of the moment, the silhouette of the moment and yet nothing about this is over produced. Another absolute bullseye for Chan. I wouldn't want to be stepping out of the car right after her...", and Remy Rippon said it "...feels befitting of the most glamarous night of awards season". Additionally, Zara Wong wrote, "I can't recall if there's ever been a stronger and more consistent red carpet style star debut, and it makes me even prouder that someone of Chinese heritage has made such a style impact in Hollywood. Gemma Chan is undoubtedly the favourite look at the Vogue office, and this will go down in Oscar history.".

Chan attended the 2019 Met Gala dressed by Tom Ford, embracing the year's "camp" theme. Her look was compiled of a "dazzling chainmail dress" and "Taylor-inspired headpiece" designed by Ford, with "Chan's straight locks" paying tribute to Cher, as Chan said, "You don't really get more icon than Elizabeth Taylor and Cher, so no pressure". Emily Chan of Vogue compared Chan's "dramatic headdress" to Taylor's "famous number from the film Boom! and a 1967 masked ball at Venice's Rezzonico Palace.". Chan was featured in Vogue's selection of the "best beauty moments from the 2019 Met Gala". Other notable fashion appearances of Chan include the Captain Marvel premiere in 2019, where she wore custom Ralph & Russo; the 2019 Vanity Fair Oscar party, styled by Tom Ford and Jimmy Choo; the 2019 Critics' Choice Awards, dressed by Jason Wu; the 2019 Golden Globes, where she wore a Valentino couture hybrid gown; among several others through the years.

Amalissa Hall of Tatler praised Chan as "a fixture on major red carpets and front rows of fashion shows", writing that "in each of her appearances, [Chan] delivers a memorable look". Continuing her partnership with Louis Vuitton, Chan's custom archival-inspired black dress from the 2022 In America-themed Met Gala was praised among the "best-dressed" of the night. Teen Vogue listed Chan among their "24 Celebrities Who Nailed It" list. Chan's styles at the 2022 and 2023 Cannes Film Festivals were also praised, where she respectively wore a "sheer gothic gown" and a "white gown adorned with sparkling pailettes", further continuing her partnership with Louis Vuitton. Chan also wore Louis Vuitton to the 2023 Vogue World event, with a custom "organza dress covered in bluish silver paillettes". In 2024, Chan was featured in Edward Enninful's final British Vogue cover, titled "40 Megastars, One Magnificent Image", appearing alongside forty notable female celebrities including Miley Cyrus, Jane Fonda, Kaia Gerber, Salma Hayek, Dua Lipa and Oprah Winfrey.

Chan has also been praised for promoting Asian fashion designers. Faye Bradley of the South China Morning Post (SCMP) wrote that Chan "made a point of wearing Asian designers on every step of her press tour to promote Crazy Rich Asians. "I think we are all becoming more aware that the greater platform you have the more responsibility you have, but it just isn't about speaking about designers, it is about speaking up when we see disparity or a problem," Chan told The Hollywood Reporter. Examples of Asian designers Chan has worn at public events include a couture chiffon Miss Sohee gown accompanied by Anabela Chan jewellery at the Newport Beach Film Festival in February 2023; a strapless pink Jason Wu gown to an event by George and Amal Clooney; a flower-style Oscar de la Renta dress by "Slaysian" creative director Laura Kim; at the 2022 Cannes Film Festival; among multiple others.

== Personal life ==
Chan dated English comedian Jack Whitehall from 2011 to 2017. She began a relationship with English actor Dominic Cooper in 2018. They resided together in London.

In September 2013, Chan appeared at the Old Bailey in central London as a witness to a fatal stabbing outside Putney Bridge tube station.

Chan is a supporter of Arsenal.

=== Political views ===
Chan and Cooper participated in the People's Vote March, expressing support for a second Brexit referendum, in October 2018. She has criticised both the Conservative and Labour parties for their processes in choosing leadership.

== Filmography ==
Key
†	Denotes projects that have not yet been released

=== Film ===
Year	Film	Role	Notes
2006	When Evil Calls	Molly Nelson	
2009	Exam	Candidate 2	
2010	Pimp	Bo	
2010	Shanghai	Shin Shin	
2010	Submarine	Kim-Lin	
2013	The Double	Glamorous Judge	
2014	Jack Ryan: Shadow Recruit	Amy Chang	
2015	Love Is a Four Letter Word: Worth Seven Points	Wife	Short film
2015	Families	Chen-Lin	
2016	Everyday Performance Artists	Melody	Short film
2016	Fantastic Beasts and Where to Find Them	Madam Ya Zhou	
2017	Transformers: The Last Knight	Quintessa (voice and motion capture)	
2017	Stratton	Aggy	
2018	Crazy Rich Asians	Astrid Leong-Teo	
2018	London Fields	Petronella	
2018	Mary Queen of Scots	Elizabeth Hardwick	
2018	Intrigo: Dear Agnes	Henny	
2018	Leading Lady Parts	Herself	Short film
2019	Captain Marvel	Minn-Erva	
2020	Let Them All Talk	Karen	
2021	Raya and the Last Dragon	Namaari (voice)	
2021	Eternals	Sersi	
2022	Don't Worry Darling	Shelley	
2023	The Creator	Maya Fey	
2023	The Boy and the Heron	Natsuko (voice)	English dub
2025	The Actor	Edna	
2026	Josephine	Claire	Also producer
TBA	Hello & Paris †		Filming

=== Television ===
Year	Title	Role	Notes
2006	Project Catwalk	Herself	10 episodes; finalist
2009	Doctor Who	Mia Bennett	Episode: "The Waters of Mars"
2010	The IT Crowd	Ivana / Female Sulu	2 episodes: "The Final Countdown", "Reynholm vs. Reynholm"
2010	Sherlock	Soo Lin Yao	Episode: "The Blind Banker"
2011	Secret Diary of a Call Girl	Charlotte	Regular (series 4)
2011	Fresh Meat	Ruth	Recurring
2012	Bedlam	Kiera	Regular (series 2)
2012	True Love	Kathy	Miniseries
2013	Shetland	Hattie James	Series 1
2013	Death in Paradise	Jennifer Cheung	Series 2, episode 7
2013	Dates	Erica	2 episodes: "Erica and Kate", "Erica and Callum"
2014	The Game	Chen Mei	Miniseries
2015–2018	Humans	Anita/Mia	Lead role
2015	Brotherhood	Miss Pemberton	Recurring
2016	Revolting Rhymes	Snow White (voice)	2 episodes
2018	Watership Down	Dewdrop (voice)	4 episodes
2019	I Am Hannah	Hannah	Television film; also writer
2020	Thunderbirds Are Go	Professor Kwark (voice)	Episode: "Icarus"
2023	Extrapolations	Natasha Alper	Episode: "2066: Lola"
2023	The Afterparty	"Zoë"	Episode: "Vivian and Zoë"
2026	The Five-Star Weekend	Gigi Ling	Main cast

=== Theatre ===
Year	Title	Role	Playwright	Theatre
2008	Turandot	Ragged / Shu Meh / Su	Bertolt Brecht	Hampstead Theatre
2012	The Sugar-Coated Bullets of the Bourgeoisie		Anders Lustgarten	Finborough Theatre
2013	Yellow Face (UK premiere)	Leah Anne Cho	David Henry Hwang	Park Theatre
2013	Our Ajax (World premiere)	Athena	Timberlake Wertenbaker	Southwark Playhouse
2014	Yellow Face	Leah Anne Cho	David Henry Hwang	Royal National Theatre
2015	The Homecoming	Ruth	Harold Pinter	Trafalgar Theatre

=== Video games ===
Year	Title	Voice Role	Notes	Ref.
2023	Diablo IV	Erys	Season 2 character	
2026	007 First Light	Dr. Selina Tan	Voice and likeness	

== Awards and nominations ==
Year	Award	Category	Project	Result	Ref.
2015	Broadcasting Press Guild Awards	Best Actress	Humans	Nominated	
2018	Screen Actors Guild Awards	Outstanding Cast in a Motion Picture	Crazy Rich Asians	Nominated	
2018	National Board of Review	Best Ensemble	Crazy Rich Asians	Won	
2018	Music City Critics' Association	Best Supporting Actress	Crazy Rich Asians	Nominated	
2019	MTV Movie Awards	Best Fight	Captain Marvel	Won	
2019	National Film and Television Awards	Best Actress	Captain Marvel	Nominated	
2022	Gold List Awards	Best Actress in a Leading Role	Eternals	Won	

== Authored articles ==
- Chan, Gemma (14 March 2017). "We Can't Turn Our Backs on a Generation of Syrian Children". Save the Children.
- Chan, Gemma (9 March 2021). "Gemma Chan: I want all women to be able to live without violence". Harper's Bazaar.
- Chan, Gemma (8 January 2022). "Gemma Chan on the truth about her father's life at sea: 'He knew what it was like to have nothing'". The Guardian.
