= Memory (Westlake novel) =

2010 novel by Donald E. Westlake

- First edition cover
- Author: Donald E. Westlake
- Audio read by: Stephen R. Thorne
- Cover artist: Glen Orbik
- Language: English
- Genre: Thriller
- Publisher: Hard Case Crime
- Publication date: April 2010
- Publication place: United States
- Pages: 366
- ISBN: 978-0857683458

Memory is a thriller novel by American writer Donald E. Westlake, published posthumously in April 2010. The novel was written in 1963 and was shopped to publishers by Westlake's then-agent, Scott Meredith, but none of them bought it despite editors praising the novel. In the late 1970s, Westlake's agent, Henry Morrison, thought he could sell the novel, but Westlake declined the offer claiming it was "too dated". The manuscript for Memory was found among Westlake's papers shortly after his death on December 31, 2008. Hard Case Crime bought Memory in 2009, then believed to be Westlake's final unpublished manuscript, and published it in 2010.

The novel was adapted into the film The Actor (2025), directed by Duke Johnson and starring André Holland as lead character Paul Cole. The novel was republished with the same title as the film, The Actor, on January 28, 2025.

== Plot ==
Actor Paul Cole has lost his memory after being violently attacked by a jealous husband who caught Paul with his wife. Stranded in a small town and hounded by police, Paul struggles to recover his identity under the watchful hostile eye of the police and get back home to New York to reclaim the life he has lost.

== Film adaptation ==
Director Duke Johnson and producer Abigail Spencer optioned the novel Memory in 2015. On February 24, 2021, Deadline reported that Ryan Gosling had signed on to star in The Actor, with Duke Johnson directing a screenplay he wrote with Stephen Cooney, based on Donald E. Westlake's novel Memory. On October 18, 2022, Spencer said in an interview with the website The Retaility that the film was in pre-production in Budapest with André Holland and Gemma Chan as the leads. Filming wrapped in April 2023 and the film was released on March 14, 2025.

The novel was republished with the same title as the film, The Actor, on January 28, 2025.

== Accolades ==
Year	Award	Category	Result	Ref
2011	Kitschies	Special Award ("Black Tentacle")	Won	
