= The Actor (2025 film) =

Film by Duke Johnson

- Theatrical release poster
- Directed by: Duke Johnson
- Screenplay by: Stephen Cooney; Duke Johnson
- Based on: Memory by Donald E. Westlake
- Produced by: Abigail Spencer; Duke Johnson; Paul Young; Ken Kao
- Starring: André Holland; Gemma Chan; May Calamawy; Asim Chaudhry; Joe Cole; Fabien Frankel; Olwen Fouéré; Edward Hogg; Toby Jones; Youssef Kerkour; Simon McBurney; Tanya Reynolds; Tracey Ullman; Scott Alexander Young
- Cinematography: Joe Passarelli
- Edited by: Garret Elkins
- Music by: Richard Reed Parry
- Production companies: Innerlight Films; Underscore Films; Waypoint Entertainment
- Distributed by: Neon
- Release date: March 14, 2025
- Running time: 98 minutes
- Country: United States
- Language: English
- Box office: $42,753

The Actor is a 2025 American crime mystery film directed by Duke Johnson from a screenplay he co-wrote with Stephen Cooney, based on the 2010 novel Memory by Donald E. Westlake. The film marks Johnson's solo directorial debut and his first live-action film. It stars André Holland and Gemma Chan in the lead roles. The supporting cast includes May Calamawy, Asim Chaudhry, Joe Cole, Fabien Frankel, Olwen Fouéré, Edward Hogg, Toby Jones, Youssef Kerkour, Simon McBurney, Tanya Reynolds, Tracey Ullman, and Scott Alexander Young.

== Plot ==
A New York actor with amnesia in 1950s Ohio becomes stranded in a mysterious small town and struggles to get back home and reclaim his life and identity.

== Cast ==
- André Holland as Paul Cole
- Gemma Chan as Edna
- May Calamawy as May / Benny's Girl / Mattie / Rita / Karen / Lady
- Asim Chaudhry as various characters
- Joe Cole as Nick
- Fabien Frankel as Benny
- Olwen Fouéré as Old Lady Track / various characters
- Edward Hogg as Make Up Artist
- Toby Jones as Lieutenant Murray / Artie Bellman / Cabbie / Arnold
- Youssef Kerkour as Black Jack / Ed / Defense Attorney / Busdriver
- Simon McBurney as Doctor Croft / Doctor Edgarton
- Tanya Reynolds as various characters
- Tracey Ullman as Mrs. Malloy / Helen / Deerville Woman
- Thomas Dominique as Phil

== Production ==
=== Development ===
In 2015, director Duke Johnson and producer Abigail Spencer optioned the 2010 novel Memory by Donald E. Westlake. In 2019, actor Ryan Gosling received the script and then he and Johnson started developing the script together through the COVID-19 pandemic. On February 24, 2021, Deadline reported that Gosling had committed to star in The Actor, with Johnson directing a screenplay he co-wrote with Stephen Cooney, marking Johnson's solo directorial debut and his first live-action film following the 2015 stop-motion film Anomalisa. Gosling was set to produce the film with Waypoint Entertainment's Ken Kao, Johnson and Abigail Spencer's Innerlight Films, and Paul Young's Make Good company, with CAA Media Finance and Endeavor Content co-repping the film's U.S. rights, and Endeavor Content handling international sales. Collider reported that before Gosling signed on to star in the film, Aaron Taylor-Johnson was previously circling the project. The Actor was a top seller at Berlin's 2021 European Film Market.

On April 12, 2021, it was reported that Neon had acquired North American distribution rights to the film and that Charlie Kaufman–who co-directed the 2015 film Anomalisa with Johnson–had joined the project as executive producer. The same day, Neon stated on their Twitter account that the film was set to be released in 2022.

On October 18, 2022, producer Abigail Spencer said in an interview with the website The Retaility that the film was in pre-production in Budapest and that André Holland and Gemma Chan were the leads. On October 29, 2022, FilmBook announced that actress Olwen Fouéré had joined the cast, which also included Tracey Ullman, May Calamawy, Tanya Reynolds, Simon McBurney, Edward Hogg, Asim Chaudhry, and Youssef Kerkour. FilmBook reported that each of the supporting actors will play several different characters, and that Fouéré played seven characters in the film.

In an interview with the YouTube channel PIVOT DXB on March 13, 2023, Calamawy said that she played five different characters in the film.

On April 4, 2023, Neon announced that Ryan Gosling–who was originally attached to star as Paul Cole before being replaced by Holland–remained part of the film as an executive producer. Johnson later said that Gosling dropped out due to scheduling conflicts.

=== Filming ===
Principal photography was originally scheduled to start in Los Angeles on September 6, 2021, but was pushed back to mid-January 2022.

Filming began in Budapest, Hungary in November 2022, and wrapped in April 2023.

== Music ==
The film score is composed by Richard Reed Parry.

== Release ==
Donald E. Westlake's novel Memory was republished with the same title of the film, The Actor, on January 28, 2025. The film was released theatrically by Neon on March 14, 2025. It made $20,941 from 23 theaters in its first weekend.

== Reception ==
On review aggregator Rotten Tomatoes, 78% of 32 critics gave the film a positive review; the website's critical consensus reads: "Blending classical storytelling with a bold, experimental style, The Actor offers an intellectually rich exploration of identity and memory for those open to its enigmatic, artful rhythm." Metacritic, which uses a weighted average, assigned the film a score of 62 out of 100, based on 13 critics, indicating "generally favorable" reviews.
