= Duke Johnson (director) =

American film director (born 1979)

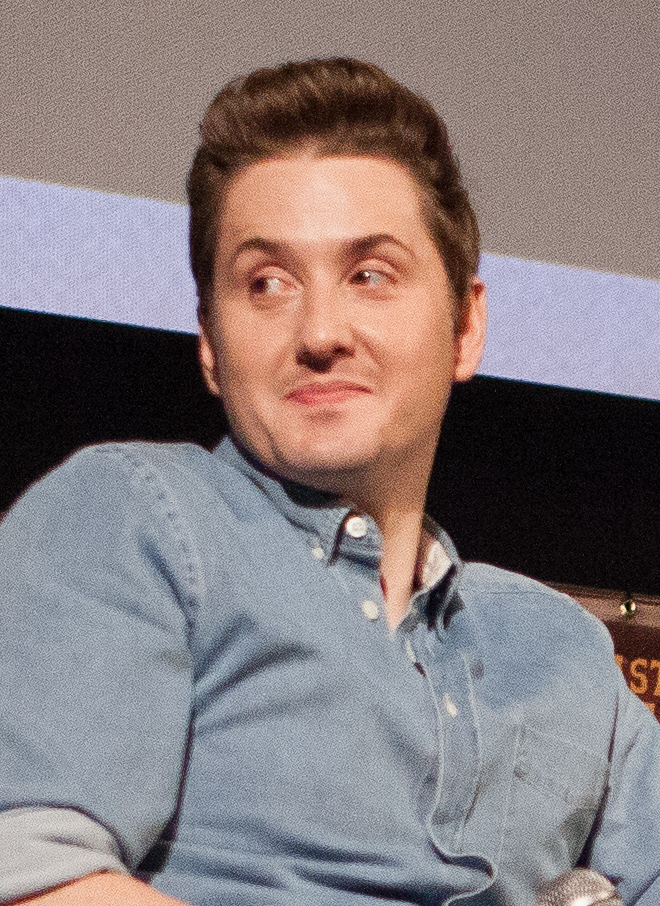
- Duke Johnson at the 2015 Fantastic Fest
- Born: March 20, 1979 (age 47); St. Louis, Missouri, U.S.
- Education: New York University, AFI Conservatory
- Occupations: Director, Writer, Producer
- Years active: 2000–present
- Spouse: Soyoung Na

Duke Johnson is an American film director who specializes in stop-motion animation. He currently serves as a director and junior partner for Dino Stamatopoulos's animation production studio Starburns Industries in Burbank, California.

== Early life ==
Johnson was raised in St. Louis, Missouri, where he attended St. John Vianney High School. Between his second and third years at St John Vianney, he attended a summer film course at Columbia College Chicago. He graduated from the film school at the Tisch School of the Arts at New York University, where he spent a semester studying animation in Prague. After graduating, he spent three years working as a waiter in a New York restaurant before moving to Los Angeles, where he obtained a Master of Fine Arts degree in directing from the AFI Conservatory in 2006.

== Career ==
Johnson has been nominated for Annie Awards in 2011 and 2012 for directing stop-motion episodes of shows such as Mary Shelley's Frankenhole and Community.

In 2016, he was nominated for the Academy Award for Best Animated Feature in the 88th Academy Awards for co-directing the stop-motion comedy-drama film Anomalisa with Charlie Kaufman.

Johnson made his solo directing debut with the 2025 film The Actor, based on the 2010 novel Memory by Donald E. Westlake.

== Filmography ==
Short film

Year	Title	Director	Producer
2006	Marrying God	Yes	No
2017	Moonwrapped	No	Yes

Feature film

Year	Title	Director	Producer	Writer	Notes
2015	Anomalisa	Yes	Yes	No	Co-directed with Charlie Kaufman
2025	The Actor	Yes	Yes	Yes	
TBA	Lincoln in the Bardo †	Yes	Yes	No	In production

Television

Year	Title	Director	Writer	Producer	Notes
2008	Moral Orel	Yes	No	No	Episode "Help"
2010	Community	Yes	No	No	Episode "Abed's Uncontrollable Christmas"
2010–2012	Mary Shelley's Frankenhole	Yes	Yes	Yes	Also matte painter
2012	Beforel Orel: Trust	Yes	No	Yes	TV special; also animator
2020	Cosmos: Possible Worlds	Yes	No	No	Supervising animation director Episode "Vavilov"

Other credits

Year	Title	Role	Notes
2003	Just an American Boy	Cinematographer	Documentary film
2020	I'm Thinking of Ending Things	Producer of animation	
2025	Severance	Animator of "Lumon is Listening" video	Episode "Hello, Ms. Cobel"
