= Abed's Uncontrollable Christmas =

- Community episode
- Abed imagines his friends in stop motion, like members of the Island of Misfit Toys, on their way to discover the true meaning of Christmas.
- Episode no.: Season 2 Episode 11
- Directed by: Duke Johnson
- Written by: Dino Stamatopoulos; Dan Harmon
- Production code: 222
- Original air date: December 9, 2010
- Running time: 21 minutes

Guest appearances
- Jim Rash as Dean Craig Pelton (voice only); John Oliver as Ian Duncan (voice only)

Episode chronology
← Previous "Mixology Certification"	Next → "Asian Population Studies"
- Community season 2

"Abed's Uncontrollable Christmas" is the eleventh episode of the second season of the American comedy television series Community. It originally aired on December 9, 2010, on NBC. Abed (Danny Pudi) begins experiencing the world in stop motion. His study group enlists the help of psychology professor Ian Duncan (John Oliver) to end the delusion, but turns against Duncan after he reveals Abed's delusion began when he learned his mother is not visiting for Christmas.

Series creator Dan Harmon and writer Dino Stamatopoulos had been interested in launching an animation studio and saw an NBC executive's suggestion of an animated episode as a starting point. With Duke Johnson as director and help from the animation studio 23D Films, the episode was Starburns Industries' first production. The script was completed within a few weeks in August 2010; the animation process began on October 18 and finished on December 8, the day before the episode premiered. A scene was also filmed for later use in "Paradigms of Human Memory".

The episode was critically acclaimed for its animation and themes of holiday loneliness, earning the show its only Primetime Emmy Award in the Animation category. It draws on the style of Rankin/Bass Christmas specials and develops Abed's characterization, concluding that his meaning of Christmas lies in his found family—the study group.

== Plot ==
On the last day of the semester, Abed (Danny Pudi) begins seeing life as stop motion. He announces this in the cafeteria to the study group's concern, then runs through the parking lot, where he sees Chang (Ken Jeong) as a snowman, and jumps on cars while singing about Christmas until he is tasered. In psychology professor Ian Duncan's (John Oliver) office, Jeff (Joel McHale) and Britta (Gillian Jacobs) express concern at Abed's risk of expulsion. Duncan believes he can publish a paper about Abed's delusions.

Despite Abed's protests against therapy, Britta leads him to the study room, where Duncan claims he is a Christmas wizard to ensure Abed's compliance. Abed describes their journey to Planet Abed, where his friends transform into toys: Jeff-in-the-Box, Troy Soldier (Donald Glover), Britta-Bot, Teddy Pierce (Chevy Chase), Ballerannie (Alison Brie) and Baby Doll Shirley (Yvette Nicole Brown). Shirley protests at her character and is ejected by Duncan, who summons a remote-control Christmas pterodactyl; Jeff is eaten by insects called "humbugs" for being sarcastic. Abed and Annie sing brief songs about their downfall.

The others arrive at the Cave of Frozen Memories. Duncan seeks to discover Abed's repressed memories but ends up revealing his own childhood, where his father was absent at Christmas. He exits, shortly followed by Britta, whom Abed rejects for tricking him into therapy. Abed, Annie, Troy, and Pierce board a train to the North Pole, but Pierce, having only agreed to play along under the promise of free Christmas cookies, leaves to use the toilet. Abed talks about watching Rudolph the Red-Nosed Reindeer (1964) with his mother every year when she visits on December 9. When Troy informs him it is currently December 9, Abed replies that it must be December 8 as his mother is not here.

Duncan (now perceived as a Christmas warlock by Abed) chases Abed across the roof of the train until Annie and Troy restrain him. Pierce returns to find Abed in Santa's workshop, and they discover a gift box containing a DVD of Lost season 1, which Abed says represents lack of payoff. Duncan returns with a Christmas card from Abed's mother, informing him that she has a new family and will not be visiting. Abed, realizing that this version of Duncan is an evil Christmas warlock, freezes in a block of ice. The other characters return and turn on Duncan, attacking and removing him with the pterodactyl while singing about what Christmas means to each of them. Abed unfreezes and concludes that the meaning of Christmas is to give it meaning, so he decides that Christmas to him should mean spending time with friends.

The group returns to the study room and joins Abed in his dorm, watching Rudolph the Red-Nosed Reindeer. In a post-credits scene, Troy and Abed talk about stop motion food while Troy eats a sandwich, then amuse themselves by trading heads.

== Production ==
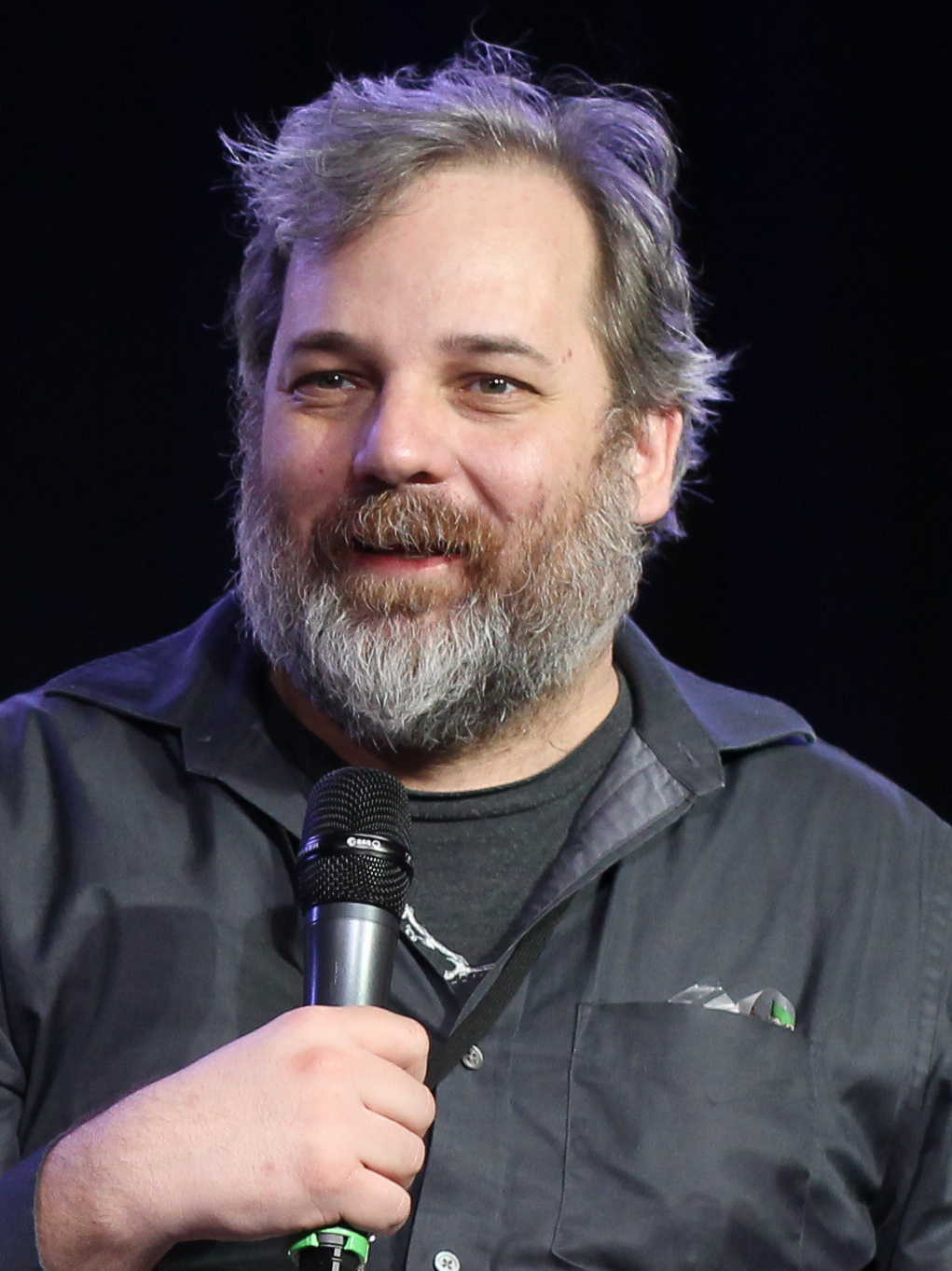
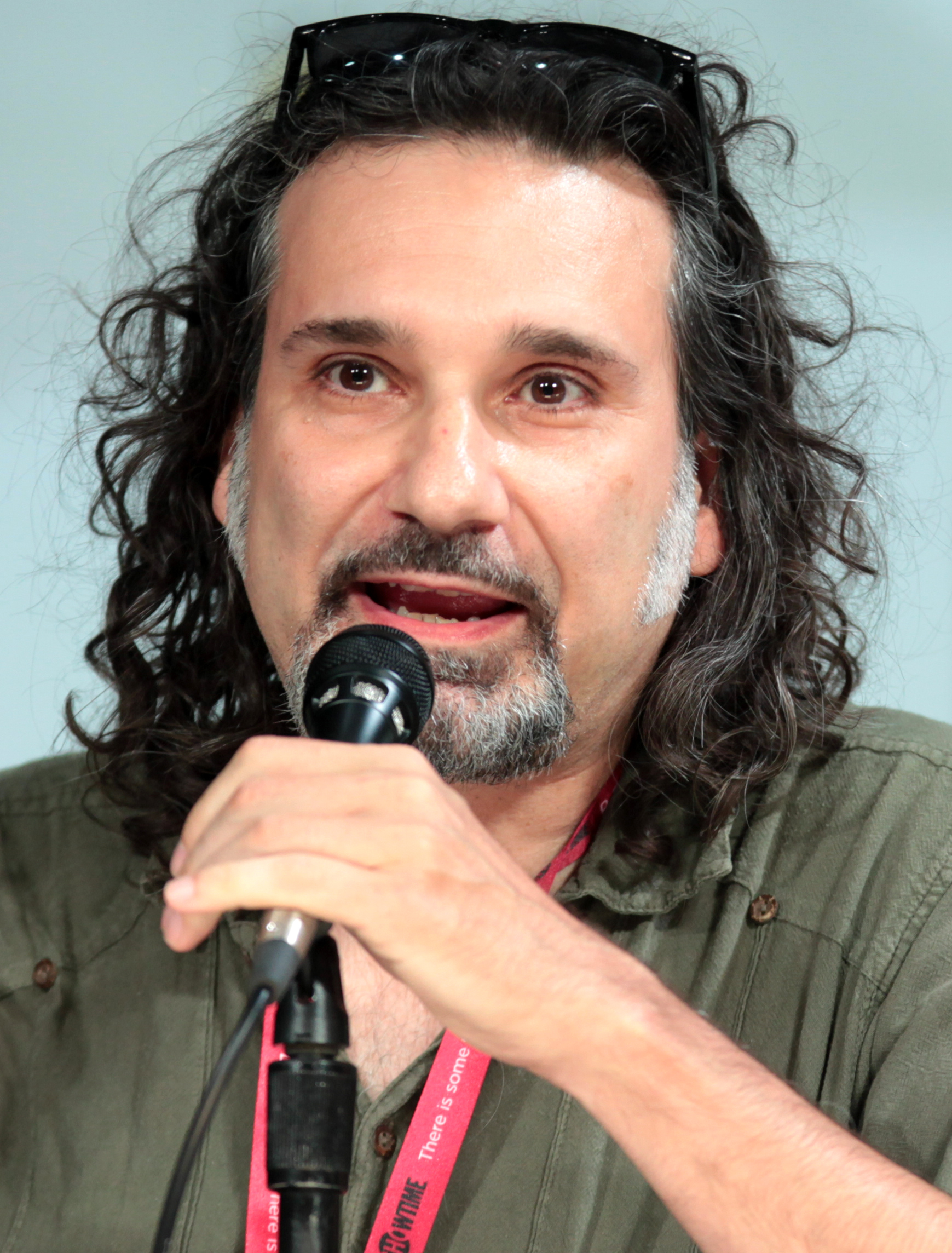
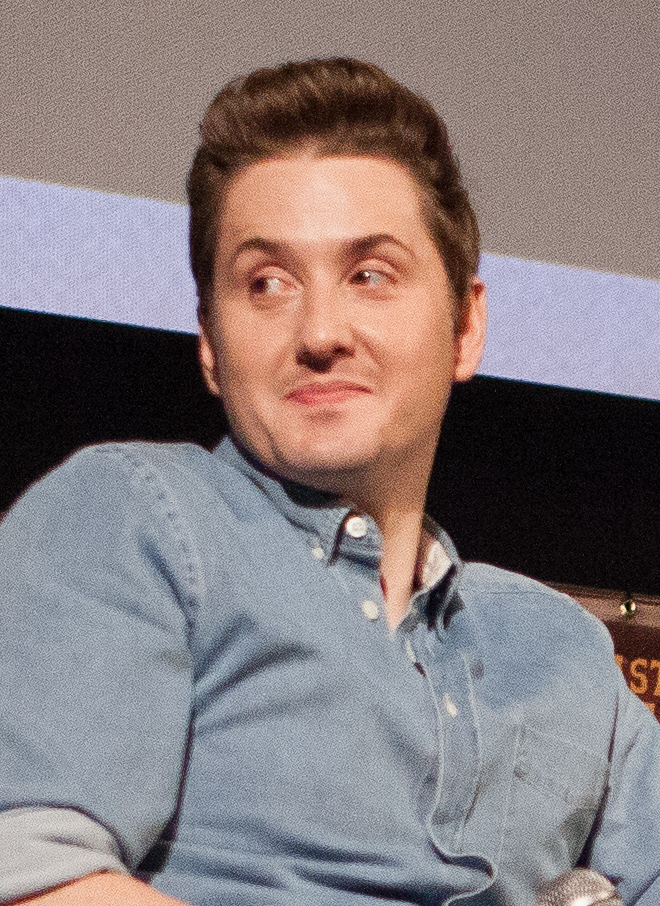
Series creator Dan Harmon (left), writer Dino Stamatopoulos (middle) and director Duke Johnson worked on "Abed's Uncontrollable Christmas" as part of the first Starburns Industries project.

The episode was written by Dino Stamatopoulos and series creator Dan Harmon, and directed by Duke Johnson. It was Johnson's first primetime half-hour television episode; he had previously directed Adult Swim programming. Its stop motion style was first suggested by Stamatopoulos, who had used it on Cartoon Network productions.

The episode begun with NBC executive Jeff Gaspin suggesting an animated episode to Harmon, although Harmon was not convinced Gaspin knew much about Community. Harmon wanted to start an animation studio with Stamatopoulos and saw Gaspin's suggestion as a way to get NBC to approve their first animation project. Their studio was called Starburns Industries, named after Stamatopoulos' Community character Star-Burns.

On August 1, 2010, NBC approved an animated episode. The script took two weeks to complete and dialogue was recorded shortly after to allow for the lengthy animation process. Harmon recalled in 2018 that they were unable to include live action scenes in the episode. The viewer seeing stop motion through Abed's perspective allowed it to exist within the show's reality and for characters to later refer to its events. The script had to be turned around quickly while the first episodes of the season were being filmed. Johnson recalled that the episode changed little from Stamatopoulos' first draft and Harmon's rewrite.

As well as Starburns Industries, the animation studio 23D Films worked on the episode. An art department of 70 employees was overseen by James Fino and Joe Russo II. (Note: Not to be confused with the Community director Joe Russo.) They designed and produced the 19 sets and 66 puppets. As Abed describes, the models are "silicone dolls, with foam bodies over ball-and-socket armatures". Animation began on October 18 with six full-time animators on a tight schedule and up to 10 separate stages in use simultaneously. Only 30–40 seconds of the recording had been completed by the end of the first week. Production concluded the day before the episode debuted.

The animation stage saw several complications. Pierce's character started using a wheelchair mid-season and this had to be incorporated late in the production. The main characters are seen in live action in the reflection of a television screen; Chase insisted on wearing socks in the shot, despite his animated counterpart's bare feet beneath his orthopedic cast. Additional footage was needed for the later episode "Paradigms of Human Memory", which was conceived during animation. It was filmed on an existing set to save money. In "Paradigms of Human Memory", a stop motion Jeff and Britta allude to their hidden sexual relationship in front of Abed and Duncan. It also shows a live action scene that makes the point that "Abed's Uncontrollable Christmas" is largely about the characters imagining a story around their study group table.

Though Harmon aimed to put remaining cash towards Starburns Industries, the episode came in 50% over budget. Visual effects were necessary to extend shots as the episode was filmed in a 16:9 aspect ratio but producers later said it needed to also be suitable for 4:3. Johnson said that Harmon invested a lot of his own money into "Abed's Uncontrollable Christmas", paying for cameras.

The episode is set on December 9, said to be the date when Abed's mother visits him. It premiered on December 9, 2010, in the Thursday 8 p.m. timeslot. It had been announced in September, before the second season's debut. The episode premiered contemporaneously with "Road to the North Pole", a Christmas special of Family Guy—the show Gaspin had initially compared Community to. Both feature multiple songs and a positive ending, with characters rediscovering the meaning of Christmas.

NBC re-aired the episode around Christmas in the years following. However, Harmon reflected in 2018 that the episode did not achieve the mainstream success necessary to avoid the show's threat of cancelation, but it did achieve critical acclaim and boost the production's morale. A still from the episode was used in New York's ranking of the year's best television shows, which Community topped.

== Analysis ==
"Abed's Uncontrollable Christmas" explores loneliness around holiday periods. Harmon was inspired by the melancholia in Charles Schultz's Peanuts holiday specials, seeing it as a crucial part of Christmas. Pudi found this relatable as he was estranged from his father as a child and felt his absence during the holiday period. Like Abed, he had loved Rudolph the Red-Nosed Reindeer (1964).

As well as Abed, Annie and Duncan have unhappy associations with the Christmas period. Pierce also empathizes with Abed's loneliness. Abed eventually concludes: "The meaning of Christmas is the idea that Christmas has meaning". The episode shows that the main characters have found each other as a found family for support and safety. The series' other Christmas episodes—"Comparative Religion", "Regional Holiday Music" and "Intro to Knots"—have similar themes, but are more light-hearted.

The episode continues Abed's use of fiction as a defence mechanism. He has been previously shown with the autistic trait of struggling to understand societal rules, but his interpretation of life as television aligns his perspective with the viewer. In this episode, the viewer sees stop motion as Abed does. Joseph S. Walker commented that Abed is often the driving force behind Community episodes that experiment with format and genre. Abed's character is explored more deeply than in most episodes, where he is paired with another character. However, Elizabeth Fleitz Kuechenmeister said that he remains two-dimensional with the episode unwilling to dwell on his negative emotions.

The animation style is like Rankin/Bass Christmas specials, particularly Rudolph the Red-Nosed Reindeer—which is central to the episode. Abed imagines each character in the style of the Island of Misfit Toys. The train to the North Pole references The Polar Express (2004). The study group members are removed by Abed one by one, followed by a brief moral song, like Willy Wonka's actions in Charlie and the Chocolate Factory (1964).

== Reception ==
In its original broadcast on December 9, 2010, "Abed's Uncontrollable Christmas" was viewed by an estimated 4.29 million viewers, with a Nielsen rating of 1.4 in the 18–49 demographic. The overall viewership was adjusted down for NBC due to local NFL broadcasts in Indianapolis and Nashville. The episode tied with the 18–49 rating from the previous episode, "Mixology Certification".

The episode was well-received on its release, as well as in later reviews. In 2015, Bustle's Mallory Carra said it was the show's peak of "hilarity and creativity". In 2019, Raja Sen of Mint wrote that it was one of the series' first and bravest risks, creating a story that was "knowingly ironic and yet committedly, achingly sincere". Ziss and Gumeny both found the episode suited to rewatching in December 2020 as the COVID-19 pandemic interrupted family traditions.

Upon the episode's release, a writer for Paste lauded the episode's success in its creative risks. The critic approved of making the stop motion part of Abed's imagination, and reviewed that the episode succeeded in making Abed less generic. They wrote that Abed came to a "heartfelt" conclusion about the meaning of Christmas, though the episode was less humorous than typical. Maggie Furlong commented in TV Squad that the episode was "as touching and poignant as this show has ever been", maintaining its characters' believability and allowing the viewer to see Abed's "unconscious vision of his friends". Entertainment Weekly's Sandra Gonzalez finished the episode with "an overwhelming love" for Abed, after finding it "heartbreaking" that Abed's mother was not visiting and "heartwarming" that his friends turned against Duncan.

James Poniewozik of Time found the episode archetypal of the show's "strong sense of play and joy in the act of invention" and its actors' "distinctive postures and expressions", which are recreated in stop motion. Poniewozik praised that the episode was not framed as a dream and that study room can briefly be seen in stop motion as characters enter and exit. However, Poniewozik criticized that the characters' actions served the animated story, rather than the converse. Den of Geek's Emma Matthews appraised the soundtrack as "pitched to perfection" and the animation as "full of fantastic visual touches". Matthews summarized that it "plays to the series' strengths", with "a familiar feeling, but totally original episode".

Adam Quigley wrote in /Film that the episode is "endlessly reverent parody that never feels overly calculated", with "undeniably joyous and exciting" animation and sound design. Quigley said that Abed's characterization is what allows for "greater metatextual awareness" and that the "brief, smartly devised moments of emotional honesty" allows the show to remain "believable and endearing". Emily St. James of The A.V. Club rated the episode an A. She found that it "nails the aesthetic", praising the songs, pop culture references and humor. St. James reviewed that the episode's "raw, emotional moments" were "surprisingly dark" and that Pierce's return and the final song were moving.

In a four-star review, Jeffrey Kirkpatrick of TV Fanatic experienced it as "passively entertaining", but overly serious. Kirkpatrick said the detailed animation was "vivid and very well done" but did not like the show's recent trend of "teaching some sort of lesson".

== Awards ==
For his work on the episode, character animator Drew Hodges won a Primetime Emmy Award for Outstanding Individual Achievement in Animation at the 63rd Primetime Creative Arts Emmy Awards. It was the show's only Emmy Award win.
