= 1979 in animation =

Events in 1979 in animation.

== Events ==
=== January ===
- January 5: Yuri Norstein's Tale of Tales premieres.

=== March ===
- March 19: The Peanuts TV special You're the Greatest, Charlie Brown premieres on CBS. This was the final Peanuts special to premiere during the 1970s.
- March 21: The first episode of The Perishers airs, based on Maurice Dodd's comic strip of the same name.

=== April ===
- April 1–2: Bill Melendez's TV special The Lion, the Witch and the Wardrobe premieres.
- April 1: Nickelodeon is launched.
- April 2: The first episode of Doraemon airs. It will run uninterrupted until 2005 and then still continue after being revived later that year.
- April 7: The first episode of Mobile Suit Gundam airs.
- April 9: 51st Academy Awards. Walter Lantz receives a Lifetime Achievement Academy Award. Special Delivery by Eunice Macauley and John Weldon wins the Academy Award for Best Animated Short Film.
- April 13: Payut Ngaokrachang's The Adventure of Sudsakorn is first released, the first and only cel-animated feature film made in Thailand.

=== May ===
- May 10–24: At the 1979 Cannes Film Festival Raoul Servais' Harpya wins a Palme d'Or for Best Short Film.
- May 30: The Chinese animated feature Prince Nezha's Triumph Against Dragon King is first released, directed by Yan Dingxian, Wang Shuchen and Xu Jingda.
- Specific date unknown: Studio Pierrot is founded.

=== July ===
- Studio Hibari is founded.

=== August ===
- August 17: The film Monty Python's Life of Brian is first released. It is primarily live-action but has an animated opening sequence by Terry Gilliam.
- August 30: Tim Burton's pencil-animated Stalk of the Celery Monster premieres.

=== September ===
- September 22:
  - The animated TV series Casper and the Angels debuts on NBC. It combines Casper the Friendly Ghost with animated versions of the cast of Charlie's Angels.
  - Scooby-Doo and Scrappy-Doo debuts on ABC. It marks the debut of the character Scrappy-Doo.
  - Fred and Barney Meet the Shmoo airs on NBC, consisting of three Flintstones series. One of the three, Fred and Barney Meet the Thing, was long stored away after ending its time slot in the early 1980s.
- September 28: Chuck Jones and Phil Monroe's anthological Looney Tunes film The Bugs Bunny/Road Runner Movie premieres at the New York Film Festival.
- Specific date unknown: Eugene Fedorenko's Every Child premieres.

=== October ===
- October 1: The first episode of Doctor Snuggles airs.
- October 10: The first episode of The Rose of Versailles airs.

=== December ===
- December 15: Hayao Miyazaki's debut film The Castle of Cagliostro is first released, the second animated film in the Lupin III franchise.
- December 19: Don Bluth's Banjo the Woodpile Cat is first released, his first production after leaving Walt Disney Productions.
- December 21: Frank Zappa releases his concert film Baby Snakes which contains stop-motion animated sequences by Bruce Bickford.

=== Specific date unknown ===
- The first episode of Amigo and Friends premieres.
- Kaj Pindal's animated short Caninabis premieres.
- Pavel Bazhov's The Fire-Fairy premieres.
- Len Lye's Free Radicals premieres.
- Vladimir Samsonov's Very Blue Beard premieres.
- Richard Condie's Getting Started premieres.
- The first episode of Alfie Atkins airs.
- Charlex is founded.
- Pixar is founded as the Graphics Group. It will be renamed to its current name in 1986.

== Films released ==
- January 5 - General Ttoli (South Korea)
- January 20 - Colargol, the Conqueror of Space (Poland)
- February 18 - Ganbare! Bokura no Hit and Run (Japan)
- March 3 - Nutcracker Fantasy (Japan)
- March 14 - Little Orbit the Astrodog and the Screechers from Outer Space (France)
- March 17:
  - Heidi, Girl of the Alps (Japan)
  - Taro the Dragon Boy (Japan)
  - Triton of the Sea (Japan)
- April 1–2 - The Lion, the Witch and the Wardrobe (United Kingdom and United States)
- April 13 - The Adventure of Sudsakorn (Thailand)
- April 16 - Historias de amor y masacre (Spain)
- April 29 - Maegami Tarou (Japan)
- May 5 - Lupin the Thief: Enigma of the 813 (Japan)
- May 19 - Prince Nezha's Triumph Against the Dragon King (China)
- June 30 - The Adventures of Manxmouse (Japan)
- July 1 - Tomorrow's Eleven (Japan)
- July 14 - Yamato: The New Voyage (Japan)
- July 15 - Taegeuksonyeon Huin Doksuri (South Korea)
- July 21:
  - Adventures of the Polar Cubs (Japan)
  - Starland Trio (South Korea)
  - Star Wars with Sun Wukong (South Korea)
- July 22 - Eunhahamdae Jiguho (South Korea)
- July 26 - Fly! Spaceship Geobukseon (South Korea)
- July 27:
  - Black Star and Golden Bat (South Korea)
  - SpaceBoy Cache (South Korea)
- July 28 - Dokkaebi Gamtu (South Korea)
- August 1 - Gancheopjamneun Ttorijanggun (South Korea)
- August 4 - Galaxy Express 999 (Japan)
- August 26 - Undersea Super Train: Marine Express (Japan)
- September - Adventures of Captain Wrongel (Soviet Union)
- September 8 - Aim for the Ace! (Japan)
- September 14 - The Bugs Bunny/Road Runner Movie (United States)
- September 15:
  - Future Boy Conan (Japan)
  - Les Misérables (Japan)
  - Yakyū-kyō no Uta: Kita no Ookami Minami no Tora (Japan)
- September 28 - Anne no Nikki: Anne Frank Monogatari (Japan)
- October 7 - Daikyouryuu Jidai (Japan)
- October 8 - The Revolt of the Thralls (Denmark)
- October 10 - Daddy-Long-Legs (Japan)
- October 11 - Galaxy Express 999: Can You Live Like A Warrior!! (Japan)
- October 20 - Seven Brothers (Finland)
- October 24 - The Fabulous Adventures of the Legendary Baron Munchausen (France)
- October 30 - The Flintstones Meet Rockula and Frankenstone (United States)
- November 10 - Ganbare!! Tabuchi-kun!! (Japan)
- November 18 - Gulliver's Travels (Australia)
- November 23 - The Adventures of Sinbad (Australia)
- November 25 - Rudolph and Frosty's Christmas in July (United States and Japan)
- December 13 - Jack Frost (United States and Japan)
- December 15 - Lupin III: The Castle of Cagliostro (Japan)
- December 20 - The Little Convict (Australia)
- December 22 - Uju Heukgisa (South Korea)
- December 23:
  - Animal Treasure Island (South Korea)
  - Scooby Goes Hollywood (United States)
- Specific date unknown:
  - Elpidio Valdés (Cuba)
  - Ubu et la Grande Gidouille (France)

== Television series ==
- January 1 - Amigo and Friends debuts in syndication.
- January 4 - Nobara no Julie debuts in syndication.
- January 7 - Anne of Green Gables debuts on Fuji TV and Animax.
- February 3:
  - The New Fred and Barney Show debuts on NBC.
  - Zenderman debuts on Fuji TV.
- February 5 - Akai Tori no Kokoro debuts in syndication.
- March 21:
  - Daltanius debuts on Tokyo Channel 12.
  - The Perishers debuts on BBC1.
- April 2:
  - Doraemon debuts on TV Asahi.
  - Josephina the Whale debuts on Tokyo Channel 12.
- April 4 - The Ultraman debuts on TBS.
- April 7:
  - Animation Kikou Marco Polo no Boken debuts on NHK.
  - Mobile Suit Gundam debuts on Nagoya TV.
  - Risu no Banner debuts in syndication.
- April 19 - Paris no Isabelle debuts on TV Tokyo.
- July 19 - Kinpatsu no Jeanie debuts in syndication.
- July 27 - Kagaku Boken Tai Tansa 5 debuts on Tokyo Channel 12.
- September 1 - Rickety Rocket debuts on ABC.
- September 8:
  - Fred and Barney Meet the Thing debuts on NBC.
  - The New Adventures of Mighty Mouse and Heckle & Jeckle debuts on CBS.
- September 9:
  - King Arthur and the Knights of the Round Table debuts on Tokyo Channel 12.
  - The New Fat Albert Show debuts on CBS and in syndication.
- September 17 - Star Blazers debuts in syndication.
- September 22:
  - Casper and the Angels, The New Adventures of Flash Gordon, The New Shmoo, and The Super Globetrotters debut on NBC.
  - Mighty Man and Yukk, Scooby-Doo and Scrappy-Doo, Spider-Woman, The Plastic Man Comedy-Adventure Show, and The World's Greatest Super Friends debut on ABC.
- October 1 - Doctor Snuggles debuts on ITV/Channel 4.
- October 6 - Koguma no Misha debuts in syndication.
- October 7:
  - Gatchaman Fighter debuts on Fuji TV.
  - Gordian Warrior debuts on Tokyo Channel 12.
- October 10 - The Rose of Versailles debuts on Nippon TV.
- October 13 - Uchuu Kubo Blue Noah debuts on Yomiuri TV.
- October 25 - Sasurai no Shojo Nell debuts on Tokyo Channel 12.
- December 8 - Fred and Barney Meet the Shmoo debuts on NBC.
- December 31 - Alfons Åberg debuts on STV.

== Births ==
=== January ===
- January 2: Erica Hubbard, American actress (voice of Abbey Wilson in The Replacements, Lead Bully in The Zeta Project episode "Lost and Found").
- January 3: Rie Tanaka, Japanese actress (voice of Lacus Clyne in Mobile Suit Gundam Seed and Mobile Suit Gundam Seed Destiny, Hikari Kujou / Shiny Luminous in Futari wa Pretty Cure Max Heart, dub voice of Cassie in Dragon Tales).
- January 6: Cristela Alonzo, American comedian, actress, writer and producer (voice of Shirley the Old Lady Bird in The Angry Birds Movie, Cruz Ramirez in the Cars franchise, Camila in The Casagrandes episode "Grandparent Trap").
- January 28: Angelique Cabral, American actress (voice of Queen Amaya in Wish, Hazel Gonzalez in DreamWorks Dragons: The Nine Realms).

=== February ===
- February 8: Josh Keaton, American actor (voice of young Hercules in Hercules, Spider-Man in The Spectacular Spider-Man, Green Lantern in Green Lantern: The Animated Series, DC Super Hero Girls, and Justice League Action, Jack Darby in Transformers Prime, Shiro in Voltron: Legendary Defender, Jason Todd in Young Justice, Flash and Steve Trevor in DC Super Hero Girls, Captain America in What If...?, Ant-Man in Avengers Assemble and Guardians of the Galaxy, Green Goblin in Spider-Man, XLR8 and Acid Breath in Ben 10).
- February 13:
  - Cissy Jones, American actress (voice of Lilith Clawthorne in The Owl House, Elita-1 in Transformers: EarthSpark, Zamira Tchaikoskaya in Tiger & Bunny, Kaguya Otsutsuki in Naruto).
  - Mena Suvari, American actress (voice of Aerith Gainsborough in Final Fantasy VII: Advent Children, Killer Frost in the Justice League Action episode "Freezer Burn").
- February 19: Brendan Hay, American television producer and writer (The Simpsons, The Mighty B!, Robot Chicken, DreamWorks Animation Television).
- February 21:
  - Jordan Peele, American actor, comedian, and filmmaker (voice of Bunny in Toy Story 4, Melvin Sneedly in Captain Underpants: The First Epic Movie, Wild in Wendell & Wild, Duke Ellington's Ghost in Big Mouth, Street Thug in the American Dad! episode "Criss-Cross Applesauce: The Ballad of Billy Jesusworth").
  - Jennifer Love Hewitt, American actress, producer and singer (voice of Madellaine in The Hunchback of Notre Dame II, Thumbelina in The Adventures of Tom Thumb and Thumbelina, Chrissy in Groove Squad, Princess Kyla in Delgo, Mrs. Laura O'Hanlon in Yes, Virginia, Helen in the Oh Yeah! Cartoons episode "Zoomates", Medusa in the Hercules episode "Hercules and the Gorgon", herself in The Weekenders episode "My Punky Valentine" and the Family Guy episode "Stuck Together, Torn Apart", performed the "Scooby-Doo, Where Are You!" Theme in Scooby-Doo and the Alien Invaders).
  - Tituss Burgess, American actor and singer (voice of Cole Tillerman in Central Park, Photog in The Angry Birds Movie, Vanity Smurf in Smurfs: The Lost Village, Glenn in The Addams Family, Sunny in Spellbound, Charoca in Elena of Avalor).
- February 23: Maryke Hendrikse, Bahamian-Canadian actress (voice of Revy in Black Lagoon, Susan Test in Johnny Test, Gilda in My Little Pony: Friendship Is Magic, Sonata Dusk in My Little Pony: Equestria Girls – Rainbow Rocks).

=== March ===
- March 5: Riki Lindhome, American actress (voice of Kimberly Harris in Duncanville, Wendy Wower in Big Hero 6: The Series, Poison Ivy in The Lego Batman Movie, Susan Murphy / Ginormica in Monsters vs. Aliens, May in the DuckTales episode "The Last Adventure!").
- March 9: Oscar Isaac, Guatemalan-American actor (voice of Spider-Man 2099 in Spider-Man: Into the Spider-Verse and Spider-Man: Across the Spider-Verse, Gomez Addams in The Addams Family and The Addams Family 2, Poe Dameron in Star Wars Resistance Jesus Christ in The King of Kings, Marc Spector/Moon Knight in the What If...? episode "What If... the Hulk fought the Mech Avengers").
- March 10: Danny Pudi, American actor (voice of Huey in DuckTales, Tiny in Harvey Girls Forever!, Brainy Smurf in Smurfs: The Lost Village, Sanjeev Joshi in Mira, Royal Detective, Bumblebee in Transformers: EarthSpark).
- March 14: Chris Klein, American actor (voice of Dash in Tron: Uprising, Gary and Rick in the American Dad! episode "With Friends Like Steve's").
- March 17:
  - Stephen Kramer Glickman, Canadian actor (voice of Pigeon Toady in Storks, Nox in Monster Hunter: Legends of the Guild).
  - Sunil Hall, American animator (Futurama, The Powerpuff Girls, My Life as a Teenage Robot, Random! Cartoons), storyboard artist (The Mighty B!, The Penguins of Madagascar), writer, director (The Penguins of Madagascar, Monsters vs. Aliens, Gravity Falls, Pickle and Peanut) and producer (co-creator of The Mighty Ones).
- March 20: Duke Johnson, American director (Anomalisa, Mary Shelley's Frankenhole, the Morel Orel episode "Help", the Community episode "Abed's Uncontrollable Christmas", the Cosmos: Possible Worlds episode "Vavilov").
- March 24: Lake Bell, American actress (voice of Black Widow in What If...? the X-Men '97 episode "Rise of Apocalypse: Part 2" and Robot Chicken, Poison Ivy in Harley Quinn, Chloe in The Secret Life of Pets and The Secret Life of Pets 2, Vanessa Fisk in Spider-Man: Into the Spider-Verse, Katrina Peanutbutter in BoJack Horseman, Mona Lisa in Mr. Peabody & Sherman).
- March 25: Lee Pace, American actor (voice of Keisuke Saga in Weathering with You, Heinrich Himmler in the Robot Chicken episode "Zero Vegetables").
- March 27: Mia Ikumi, Japanese manga artist (Tokyo Mew Mew), (d. 2022).

=== April ===
- April 1: Matt Silverstein, American television producer (Animation Domination High-Def, Solar Opposites) and writer (3-South, Greg the Bunny, The Goode Family, The Cleveland Show, Axe Cop, Golan the Insatiable, co-creator of Drawn Together and DJ & the Fro).
- April 4: Natasha Lyonne, American actress (voice of Smoky Quartz in Steven Universe, Loretta Geargrinder in Robots, Merton in DC League of Super-Pets, Sophie Krustofsky in The Simpsons, Gaz Digzy in Ballmastrz: 9009, Suzette and Nadia Vulvokov in Big Mouth).
- April 7: Nico Santos, Filipino-American actor (voice of Buckley in Wish Dragon, Robert in The Prince, Jamie in Tuca & Bertie, Jonathan in Hailey's On It!).
- April 12: Jennifer Morrison, American actress (voice of Catwoman in Batman: Hush, Wasp in The Super Hero Squad Show).
- April 21: James McAvoy, Scottish actor (voice of Gnomeo in Gnomeo & Juliet and Sherlock Gnomes, Arthur Claus in Arthur Christmas, Hazel in Watership Down).
- April 29: Alberto Mielgo, Spanish director, artist, and animator (Tron: Uprising, the Love, Death and Robots episode "The Witness", Spider-Man: Into the Spider-Verse, The Windshield Wiper).

=== May ===
- May 1: Alisa Harris-Norico, American animator (Kappa Mikey, Curious Pictures, BrainPop) and production intern (Courage the Cowardly Dog).
- May 4: Lance Bass, American musician, actor and member of NSYNC (voice of Elliot in Handy Manny, Robby in the Kim Possible episode "Oh Boyz", Sev'ral Timez in the Gravity Falls episode "Boyz Crazy", Electrician Hero in the Higglytown Heroes episode "Electric Evening", himself in The Simpsons episode "New Kids on the Blecch" and the BoJack Horseman episode "Out to Sea").
- May 5: Vincent Kartheiser, American actor (voice of Ezekiel in Rango, Marsh Merriwether in High School USA!).
- May 7: Crystal Chesney-Thompson, American animator (Futurama, Looney Tunes: Back in Action, Looney Tunes, Curious George, Ralph Breaks the Internet), storyboard artist (Duck Dodgers, Drawn Together, Horton Hears a Who!, Sit Down, Shut Up, Full English, How Murray Saved Christmas, Dawn of the Croods, Disenchantment), sheet timer (How Murray Saved Christmas) and director (The Simpsons Movie, Sit Down, Shut Up, Futurama, Napoleon Dynamite, Dawn of the Croods, Tarantula, Disenchantment, The Boys Presents: Diabolical).
- May 8: Ryan Belleville, Canadian actor and comedian (voice of Holger Hogaart in Detentionaire, additional voices in Hotel Transylvania: The Series).
- May 9: Rosario Dawson, American actress (voice of Principal Ramiro in It's Pony, Rezzoch in The Last Kids on Earth, Wonder Woman in the DC Animated Movie Universe, Daria in Elena of Avalor, Batgirl in The Lego Batman Movie, Nyx in Tinker Bell and the Legend of the NeverBeast, Dr. Mimy in the Love, Death & Robots episode "Swarm").
- May 11: Pierre Bouvier, Canadian singer, musician and member of Simple Plan (performed the theme song of What's New, Scooby-Doo?, voice of Jake in PAW Patrol: The Movie).
- May 19: Kyle A. Carrozza, American animator (The SpongeBob Movie: Sponge Out of Water), storyboard artist (Danger Rangers, Random! Cartoons, Fish Hooks, Bravest Warriors, Fanboy & Chum Chum, Animaniacs), composer, writer and producer (creator and voice of Prohyas and various other characters in Mighty Magiswords).
- May 22: Maggie Q, American actress (voice of Wonder Woman in Young Justice).
- May 23: Josh Cooley, American animator, screenwriter, director, and voice actor (Pixar).
- May 26: Elisabeth Harnois, American actress (voice of Ki in Mars Needs Moms, Zoe Young in Fantastic Max, Rosie in Midnight Patrol: Adventures in the Dream Zone).
- May 30: Rie Kugimiya, Japanese actress (voice of Aguri Madoka / Cure Ace in DokiDoki! PreCure, Alphonse Elric in Fullmetal Alchemist, Happy in Fairy Tail, Japanese dub voice of Oscar Pine in RWBY, Ronnie Anne Santiago in The Loud House and The Casagrandes, and the title characters in Peppa Pig and Ruby Gloom).

=== June ===
- June 2: Morena Baccarin, Brazilian actress (voice of Talia al Ghul in Son of Batman and Batman: Bad Blood, Black Canary in Justice League Unlimited, Cheetah in the Batman: The Brave and the Bold episode "Triumvirate of Terror!").
- June 5: Aspen Vincent, American actress and singer (voice of Dodie Bishop in As Told by Ginger).
- June 9: Jefferson Utanes, Flipino voice actor (voice of Goku in Dragon Ball Z, James in Pokémon, Mr. Krabs in Spongebob Squarepants, Doraemon in Doraemon, Shrek in Shrek, Ben Tennyson in Ben 10, Genie in Aladdin, Mickey Mouse, Knuckles the Echidna in Sonic Prime), (d. 2025).
- June 18: Yumiko Kobayashi, Japanese actress (voice of Bokkun in Sonic X, Souta Minamino in Suite PreCure, Shinnosuke Nohara in Crayon Shin-chan, dub voice of Darwin Watterson in The Amazing World of Gumball and Wilson in Chuggington).
- June 20: Sarah Stiles, American singer and actress (voice of Spinel in Steven Universe: The Movie and Steven Universe Future, Lacey in Sunny Day).
- June 21: Chris Pratt, American actor (voice of Barley Lightfoot in Onward, Emmet Brickowski in The Lego Movie franchise, Mario in The Super Mario Bros. Movie, Garfield in The Garfield Movie, Cooper in Ben 10: Ultimate Alien).
- June 24: Mindy Kaling, American actress and comedian (voice of Disgust in Inside Out, Taffyta Muttonfudge in Wreck-It Ralph, Val Little in Monsters at Work, Velma Dinkley in Velma).
- June 28: Felicia Day, American actress (voice of Annie in Generator Rex, Cynder in Skylanders Academy, Angela in Fish Hooks, Betty in Adventure Time, Erika Violette in Stretch Armstrong and the Flex Fighters, Mary Jane Watson in Spider-Man, Bria in The Owl House episode "Through the Looking Glass Ruins", Pear Butter in the My Little Pony: Friendship Is Magic episode "The Perfect Pear").
- June 29: Stephanie Lemelin, American actress and comedienne (voice of Mei Ling in Secrets of the Furious Five, Artemis Crock in Young Justice, Nurse Lady Pam in Fanboy & Chum Chum, Eep, Clip, Handsy and Mal in Dawn of the Croods, Audrey and Pegtor in Harvey Girls Forever!, Xena Treme in The Rocketeer, Rooky Partnur in Lego City Adventures, Electro in Spidey and His Amazing Friends, Kieren in the Curious George episode "Orange Crush", Shiera Sanders in the DC Super Hero Girls episode "#TheBirdAndTheBee").

=== July ===
- July 6: Kevin Hart, American actor and comedian (voice of Snowball in The Secret Life of Pets franchise, George Beard in Captain Underpants: The First Epic Movie, Ace the Bat-Hound in DC League of Super-Pets).
- July 12: Omid Abtahi, Iranian-American actor (voice of Dr. Jagu in Space Chimps and Space Chimps 2: Zartog Strikes Back, Cadet Amis in Star Wars: The Clone Wars, Faris D'jinn in DuckTales, Hawkman in Justice Society: World War II).
- July 13: Laura Benanti, American actress (voice of Lady Caine in Rapunzel's Tangled Adventure).
- July 14: Scott Porter, American actor (voice of Ben Reilly / Scarlet Spider in Ultimate Spider-Man, Flash in Harley Quinn, George Stacy in Spidey and His Amazing Friends).
- July 18: Jason Weaver, American actor and singer (singing voice of young Simba in The Lion King, voice of Condor in The LeBrons).
- July 22: Parvesh Cheena, American actor (voice of Zulius in Centaurworld, Tibbles Grimmhammer in The Owl House).
- July 24: Rose Byrne, Australian actress (voice of Brandy in Bluey, Leatherhead in Teenage Mutant Ninja Turtles: Mutant Mayhem, Jemima Puddle-Duck in Peter Rabbit and Peter Rabbit 2: The Runaway).
- July 31: Asami Yaguchi, Japanese voice actress (voice of Kuchipatchi in the Tamagotchi franchise, Haruo in the Doraemon franchise), (d. 2026).

=== August ===
- August 1: Jason Momoa, American actor (voice of Aquaman in The Lego Movie 2: The Second Part, himself in The Simpsons episode "The Fat Blue Line").
- August 9:
  - Paul Robertson, Australian animator (Gravity Falls, Rick and Morty, Adventure Time, animated the couch gag for The Simpsons episode "My Fare Lady").
  - Aimee Steinberger, American animator (Futurama, Looney Tunes, The Simpsons), storyboard artist (Descendants: Wicked World, Camp WWE, Dawn of the Croods, Tarantula, Disenchantment, Apple & Onion, Little Ellen) and sheet timer (Drawn Together, Sit Down, Shut Up).
- August 10: JoAnna Garcia Swisher, American actress (voice of Liddane in the Family Guy episode "8 Simple Rules for Buying My Teenage Daughter", Shauna in The Penguins of Madagascar episode "Love Hurts").
- August 11: Drew Nelson, Canadian actor (voice of Duncan in the Total Drama franchise, Kai in the 6teen episode "The New Guy", Alex in the Braceface episode "Leap of Faith").
- August 12: Peter Browngardt, American animator (Futurama, Shorties Watchin' Shorties, The Venture Bros.), storyboard artist (Cartoon Network Studios, The Ricky Gervais Show), writer and producer (Looney Tunes Cartoons, Tom and Jerry Special Shorts, creator of and voice of the title character in Uncle Grandpa, and Festro and Dingle in Secret Mountain Fort Awesome and Uncle Grandpa).
- August 27: Aaron Paul, American actor (portrayed Jesse Pinkman in The Simpsons episode "What Animated Women Want", voice of Chuck in Help! I'm a Fish, Glenn in Robot Chicken DC Comics Special, Cyrus in Tron: Uprising, Todd Chavez, Prince Gustav, Emperor Fingerface and Henry Fondle in BoJack Horseman).

=== September ===
- September 8: P!nk, American musician (portrayed herself in the SpongeBob SquarePants episode "Truth or Square", voice of Gloria in Happy Feet Two).
- September 18: Alison Lohman, American actress (voice of Nausicaä in Nausicaä of the Valley of the Wind).
- September 28: Anndi McAfee, American actress (voice of Cera in The Land Before Time franchise, Robin Starling in Tom and Jerry: The Movie, Jessie Bannon in Jonny's Golden Quest and Jonny Quest vs. The Cyber Insects, Phoebe Heyerdahl in Hey Arnold!, Ashley Armbruster in Recess, Carrie Kelley/80's Robin in The New Batman Adventures episode "Legends of the Dark Knight").

=== October ===
- October 4:
  - Rachael Leigh Cook, American actress (voice of Chelsea Cunningham in Batman Beyond, Tifa Lockhart in Final Fantasy VII: Advent Children, various characters in Robot Chicken).
  - Caitríona Balfe, Irish actress (voice of Tavra in The Dark Crystal: Age of Resistance, Dorothy's Mother in Angela's Christmas Wish).
- October 9:
  - Chris O'Dowd, Irish actor and comedian (voice of Dr. Cockroach in Monsters vs. Aliens, Grub in Epic, Kwan in My Father's Dragon, the Narrator in Puffin Rock, Seamus in The Simpsons episode "A Serious Flanders").
  - Brandon Routh, American actor (voice of Atom in Vixen, Todd Ingram in Scott Pilgrim Takes Off, the title character in The Batman episode "The Everywhere Man").
- October 20: John Krasinski, American actor and filmmaker (voice of Superman in DC League of Super-Pets, Lancelot in Shrek the Third, 7723 in Next Gen, Owen Huntington in Animal Crackers, Frank McCay in Monsters University, Cuthbert in Monsters vs. Aliens, Honjo in The Wind Rises, Gilbert in the American Dad! episode "Irregarding Steve").

=== November ===
- November 5: Leonardo Nam, Argentine actor (voice of Vincent Omata in DC Showcase: Death, Rickter in Pacific Rim: The Black).
- November 8: Dania Ramirez, Dominican actress (voice of Scandal Savage in Suicide Squad: Hell to Pay, Red Velvet in the Justice League Action episode "She Wore Red Velvet").
- November 24: Ian Wasseluk, American animator, storyboard artist (Cartoon Network Studios, Disney Television Animation, All Hail King Julien, Bunnicula, Bob's Burgers, Central Park, Rugrats, The Mighty Ones, Jellystone!), character designer (The Powerpuff Girls), prop designer (My Life as a Teenage Robot, Cartoon Network Studios, The Happy Elf), production assistant (The Powerpuff Girls, The Powerpuff Girls Movie), writer (Fish Hooks, Star vs. the Forces of Evil, Warner Bros. Animation, The Mighty Ones) and director (Warner Bros. Animation).
- November 27: Ike Amadi, Nigerian actor (voice of Angor Rot in the Tales of Arcadia franchise, Martian Manhunter in the Tomorrowverse, M'Baku / Man-Ape in Avengers Assemble).
- November 28: Daniel Henney, American actor and model (voice of Tadashi Hamada in Big Hero 6 and Big Hero 6: The Series).

=== December ===
- December 3: Tiffany Haddish, American comedian and actress (voice of Delsyia in TripTank, Cindy in Legends of Chamberlain Heights, Queen Watevra Wa'Nabi in The Lego Movie 2: The Second Part, Tuca in Tuca & Bertie, Daisy in The Secret Life of Pets 2, Debbie in The Angry Birds Movie 2, Master of Ceremonies in The SpongeBob Movie: Sponge on the Run, The Sound Someone Makes When They Explode From The Waist Up in Phineas and Ferb the Movie: Candace Against the Universe, Aisha and Terri in Solar Opposites, Lady K in Karma's World, Kitty in The Freak Brothers, Patricia in the Bob's Burgers episode "Roamin' Bob-iday", Ms. Hill in The Proud Family: Louder and Prouder episode "Home School").
- December 7: Eric Bauza, Canadian-American actor (voice of Stimpy in Ren & Stimpy "Adult Party Cartoon", Foop in The Fairly OddParents, Periwinkle "Peri" in The Fairly OddParents: A New Wish, the Beagle Boys in DuckTales, Puss in Boots in some media, Belly Bag in Uncle Grandpa, Dr. Psychobos, Driba, Fistrick, and various Omnitrix aliens in Ben 10: Omniverse, Master Frown in Unikitty, Fozzie Bear, Statler, Sam the Eagle, Robin the Frog, and Dr. Bunsen Honeydew in Muppet Babies, José Carioca and Scrooge McDuck in Legend of the Three Caballeros, Splinter in Rise of the Teenage Mutant Ninja Turtles, Mr. Woodbird in T.O.T.S., White Pantera in El Tigre: The Adventures of Manny Rivera, Buhdeuce in Breadwinners, Harry, Sniff, and Lloyd in Pupstruction, Mr. Negative in Spider-Man, Adam Warlock in the Guardians of the Galaxy, Amadeus Cho, Iron Spider, and Scorpian in Ultimate Spider-Man, Sentinels in X-Men '97, Principal Faust in The Owl House episode "Them's the Break,s Kid", continued voice of Bugs Bunny, Daffy Duck, and various characters in the Looney Tunes franchise and Woody Woodpecker), (d. 2026).
- December 11: Rider Strong, American actor (voice of Carl Jenkins in Roughnecks: Starship Troopers Chronicles, Tom Lucitor in Star vs. the Forces of Evil, Brick Flagg in Kim Possible, George in Bobby's World, Pollux in the Hercules episode "Hercules and the Trojan War", Bobby Vance in the Batman Beyond episode "Lost Soul").
- December 15: Adam Brody, American actor, writer, musician, and producer (voice of Woodie Stone in Good Vibes, Bob in My Father's Dragon).
- December 17: Lil Rel Howery, American actor and comedian (voice of Alex in The Angry Birds Movie 2, Marv in Luck, Darnell in Craig of the Creek, Rollo in Eureka!, Virtuous Saint Goodberry in the Rapunzel's Tangled Adventure episode "The Eye of Pincosta").
- December 27: Carson Palmer, American former football quarterback (voiced himself in The Replacements episodes "Ball Hogs", "Dick Daring's All-Star Holiday Stunt Spectacular", "Shelton's Bar Mitzvah" and "Irreplaceable").
- December 29: Diego Luna, Mexican actor (voice of Manolo Sanchez in The Book of Life, Chip in DC League of Super-Pets, Krel Tarron in the Tales of Arcadia franchise, Zatz in Maya and the Three).
- December 30: Catherine Taber, American actress (voice of Padmé Amidala in Star Wars: The Clone Wars, Lori Loud in The Loud House).

=== Specific date unknown ===
- Edgar Duncan, American animator (The Brave Little Toaster to the Rescue, The Brave Little Toaster Goes to Mars), background artist (Klasky Csupo, Universal Cartoon Studios, Film Roman, Disney Television Animation, Happily Ever After: Fairy Tales for Every Child, Mad Jack the Pirate, Nickelodeon Animation Studio, Futurama, Baby Blues, Drawn Together) and prop designer (Futurama, Drawn Together).
- Mairon Bennett, Canadian voice actress (voice of My Melody in Hello Kitty's Furry Tale Theater).

== Deaths ==
=== January ===
- January 5: Billy Bletcher, American actor (voice of Pete and the Big Bad Wolf, the Pincushion Man in Balloon Land, Owl Jolson's disciplinarian father in I Love to Singa, the Menacing Spider in Bingo Crosbyana, Spike the Bulldog and Tom Cat in Tom & Jerry, Papa Bear in The Three Bears, the Villainous Wolf in Little Red Riding Rabbit), dies at age 84.
- January 16: Ted Cassidy, American actor (voice of Lurch in The Addams Family and The New Scooby-Doo Movies episode "Wednesday is Missing", Frankenstein Jr. in Frankenstein Jr. and The Impossibles, Brainiac and Black Manta in Challenge of the Superfriends, Galactus in Fantastic Four, The Thing in The New Fantastic Four), dies at age 46.

=== February ===
- February 1: Mort Marshall, American actor (voice of Stanley Livingstone, Rocky Maninoff and other various characters in Tennessee Tuxedo and His Tales, Klondike Kat in The Beagles, original voice of the Trix Rabbit), dies at age 60.
- February 13: Yuri Merkulov, Russian animator and film director (Bratishkin's Adventures), dies at age 77.
- February 15: George Dunning, Canadian animator and film director (The Beatles, Yellow Submarine, directed the main titles for A Shot in the Dark), dies at age 58.

=== March ===
- March 13: Tudor Owen, Welsh actor (voice of Towser in 101 Dalmatians), dies at age 81.

=== April ===
- April 1: Barbara Luddy, American actress (voice of Lady in Lady and the Tramp, Merryweather in Sleeping Beauty, Rover in One Hundred and One Dalmatians, Kanga in Winnie the Pooh), dies at age 70.
- April 29: Hardie Gramatky, American novelist, comics artist and animator (Walt Disney Animation Studios), dies at age 72.

=== June ===
- June 16: Lazar Lagin, Soviet science fiction writer, children's writer, satirist, and screenwriter (scripted Passion of Spies), dies at age 75.
- June 25: Dave Fleischer, American animator, film producer and director (co-founder of Fleischer Studios, Koko the Clown, Betty Boop, Popeye, Let's All Go to the Lobby), dies of a stroke at age 84.

=== September ===
- September 12: Les Clark, American animator and film director (Disney Studios), dies at age 71.

=== October ===
- October 30: Oscar Conti, Argentine cartoonist, caricaturist, animator and comics artist (The First Foundation of Buenos Aires), dies at age 65.

=== November ===
- November 21: Paul Wexler, American actor (voice of car mechanic in 101 Dalmatians), dies at age 50.
- November 30: Dick Huemer, American animator, comic strip artist, and illustrator (redesigned and developed Koko the Clown, created Fitz (Ko-Ko's canine companion), created Scrappy, storyboard artist for Dumbo), dies at age 81.

=== December ===
- December 27: Nikolai Khodataev, Russian film director and animator (Interplanetary Revolution, China in Flames, One of Many, The Samoyed Boy, The Little Organ and Fialkin's Career), dies at age 87.

=== Specific date unknown ===
- Adam Beckett, American animator, special effects artist and teacher (Star Wars), dies at age 28 or 29 in a house fire.

== See also ==
- 1979 in anime
