= The Perishers (TV series) =

1979 British children's animated TV series

- Title card
- Genre: Cartoon series Children's television
- Created by: Maurice Dodd
- Directed by: Dick Horn
- Voices of: Judy Bennett; Peter Hawkins; Leonard Rossiter; Sheila Steafel
- Composer: Trevor Evan Jones
- Country of origin: United Kingdom
- Original language: English
- No. of series: 1
- No. of episodes: 20

Production
- Executive producer: Graham Clutterbuck
- Producer: Graeme Spurway
- Editor: John Farrow
- Camera setup: Gary Knowelden; Nick Boisson
- Running time: 5 minutes
- Production companies: Bill Melendez Productions; FilmFair

Original release
- Network: BBC1
- Release: 21 March – 4 May 1979

The Perishers is an animated cartoon series produced by Bill Melendez Productions and FilmFair. BBC1 transmitted it in 1979 and repeated until 1988. The series is based on Maurice Dodd's long-running comic strip, The Perishers. Voices were provided by Sheila Steafel (Maisie and Marlon), Leonard Rossiter (Boot), Judy Bennett (Wellington and Baby Grumpling), and Peter Hawkins (B. H. (Calcutta) Failed).

Castle Vision published the first home video release of The Perishers: Two VHS videocassettes, each with 10 episodes. Abbey Home Media republished the first 10 episodes to a Region 2 DVD titled The Perishers: Magic Mirror (27 February 2006), and the remaining 10 episodes to a second DVD, The Perishers: The Skateboard Champion (12 March 2007). In 2025, Fabulous Films released the complete series on both DVD and Blu-ray, newly remastered from the original 35mm films.

== Episodes ==
- Magic Mirror
- In the Cart
- A Life from the Ocean Wave
- A-Camping We Will Go
- A Fool and His Money aren't as Easily Parted as You Think
- Who's Afraid of the Big Bad Bath?
- How to Train the Family Dog
- The Ugly Duckling
- Look Before It Leaps
- Spring Fever
- The Skateboard Champion
- The Wheeling and Dealing
- She May or She May Not
- Noblesse Oblige
- Well Blow Me Down
- Bone Champions
- The Rehabilitation of BH (Calcutta) Failed
- The Inch-Thick Ketchup Sandwich
