= 1979 in anime =

The events of 1979 in anime.

== Accolades ==
- Ōfuji Noburō Award: The Castle of Cagliostro

== Releases ==
English name	Japanese name	Type	Demographic	Regions
Adventures of the Polar Cubs	北極のムーシカ ミーシカ (Hokkyoku no Mushika Mishika)	Movie	Family	Spain, Poland, Arabia, Japan, United States
Age of the Great Dinosaurs	大恐竜時代 (Daikyōryū Jidai)	Special	Children	Japan, Spain, Italy, United States
Aim for the Ace!	エースをねらえ! (Ēsu o Nerae!)	Movie	Shōjo	Japan, Italy, France, Spain, Russia
Anne of Green Gables	赤毛のアン (Akage no An)	TV	Shōjo	Japan, Spain, Portugal, Poland, Italy, France, Germany, Nederlands, Vietnam, Russia, Arabia, China (Taiwan), Korea
Bannertail: The Story of Gray Squirrel	シートン動物記 りすのバナー (Shīton Dōbutsuki Risu no Banā)	Special	Children	Portugal, Italy, Spain, Germany, Japan, Poland, Arabia
The Castle of Cagliostro	ルパン三世 カリオストロの城 (Rupan Sansei: Kariosutoro no Shiro)	Movie	Seinen	Denmark, Germany, Nederlands, France, Spain, Italy, Portugal, Sweden, Poland, Japan, Russia, United States
Doraemon	ドラえもん (Doraemon)	TV	Children	Arabia, Spain, Portugal, Canada, Japan, China (Hong Kong), Italy, Philippines, Indonesia, India
Galaxy Express 999	銀河鉄道999 (Ginga Tetsudō 999)	Movie	Shōnen	Argentina, Chile, Finland, France, Italy, Japan, Korea, Russia, Sweden, United States, Venezuela
Good Luck! Our Hit and Run	がんばれ!ぼくらのヒットエンドラン (Ganbare! Bokura no Hit and Run)	Movie	Shōnen	Japan
Good Luck!! Tabuchi-kun!!	がんばれ!!タブチくん! (Ganbare!! Tabuchi-kun!!)	Movie	Seinen	Japan
Hana no Ko Lunlun	花の子ルンルン (Hana no Ko Runrun)	TV	Shōjo	Germany, Spain, France, Poland, Italy, Russian, Arabia, Japan, United States
House of Flames	火宅 (Kataku)	Movie	Seinen	Japan
Japanese Masterpiece Fairy Tale Series: Heart of the Red Bird	日本名作童話シリーズ 赤い鳥のこころ (Nihon Meisaku Dōwa Shirīzu: Akai Tori no Kokoro)	TV	Children	Japan
Julie the Wild Rose	野ばらのジュリー (Nobara no Julie)	TV	Shōjo	Italy, Spain, Arabia, Japan, Korea
Les Misérables	ジャン・バルジャン物語 (Jean Valjean Monogatari)	Special	Family	Japan, France
Lupin the Thief: Enigma of the 813	怪盗ルパン 813の謎 (Kaitō Lupin: 813 no Nazo)	Special	Family	Japan
Mobile Suit Gundam	機動戦士ガンダム (Kidō Senshi Gandamu)	TV	Shōnen	Japan
Nutcracker Fantasy	くるみ割り人形 (Kurumiwari Ningyō)	Movie	Family	Japan, United States
Preface Taro	まえがみ太郎 (Maegami Tarou)	Special	Family	Japan
The Rose of Versailles	ベルサイユのばら (Berusaiyu no Bara)	TV	Shōjo	Portugal, Spain, France, Italian, Japan, Russia, Arabia, China (Taiwan), Korea
Taro the Dragon Boy	龍の子太郎 (Tatsu no ko Tarō)	Movie	Family	Germany, Spain, Japan, Russia, Arabia
Time Bokan Series: Zenderman	タイムボカンシリーズ ゼンダマン (Taimu Bokan Shirīzu: Zendaman)	TV	Shōnen	Japan
Tomorrow's Eleven	あしたの勇者(イレブン)たち (Ashita no Eleven-tachi)	Movie	Shōnen	Japan, Spain, Italy
Undersea Super Train: Marine Express	海底超特急 マリン・エクスプレス (Kaitei Chōtokkyū Marin Ekusupuresu)	Movie	Shōnen, Family	Japan, Italy
Unico: Black Cloud and White Feather	短編ユニコ 黒い雲と白い羽 (Tanpen Unico: Kuroi Kumo to Shiroi Hane)	Movie	Shōjo	Japan
Yamato: The New Voyage	宇宙戦艦ヤマト 新たなる旅立ち (Uchū Senkan Yamato: Aratanaru Tabidachi)	Movie	Shōnen	Italy, France, Japan, China (Taiwan)

== See also ==
- 1979 in animation
