= List of Detentionaire episodes =

Detentionaire is a Canadian animated series created by Daniel Bryan Franklin and Charles Johnston and produced by Nelvana. The show consists of 4 seasons of 13 episodes each, except for the first one which contains 14 due to including the pilot episode. Both Canadian and Australian airdates are provided; all seasons except the first one aired in Australia prior to airing in Canada.

== Series overview ==
Season	Episodes	Originally released		
Season	Episodes	First released	Last released	Network
1	14	September 12, 2011 (CA); May 12, 2012 (AU)	April 5, 2012 (CA); August 11, 2012 (AU)	Teletoon (Canada); ABC3 (Australia)
2	13	August 31, 2012 (AU); September 6, 2012 (CA)	September 18, 2012 (AU); December 6, 2012 (CA)	Teletoon (Canada); ABC3 (Australia)
3	13	June 6, 2013 (AU); September 5, 2013 (CA)	June 24, 2013 (AU); December 12, 2013 (CA)	Teletoon (Canada); ABC3 (Australia)
4	13	November 8, 2013 (AU); January 8, 2015 (CA)	January 31, 2014 (AU); January 29, 2015 (CA)	Teletoon (Canada); ABC3 (Australia)

== Episodes ==
=== Season 1 (2011–12) ===
No. overall	No. in season	Title	Written by	Original air date	Australian air date
1	1	"Blitzkrieg Bop'd"	Daniel Bryan Franklin & Charles Johnston	September 12, 2011	May 12, 2012
On the first day of tenth grade, Lee Ping is framed for a mind-blowing prank and thus is sentenced to one full year of detention and one full year of grounding. Lee's fellow inmate Biff convinces him to sneak out of detention to collect evidence from the auditorium which can prove his innocence. The only thing Lee can salvage is a camera phone which contains a picture of someone messing with Lee's bag during the Prank, and when Lee finds a match for the hand in the photo he will clear his name.
2	2	"Jock and Roll High School"	Daniel Bryan Franklin & Charles Johnston	September 13, 2011	May 19, 2012
Having collected a photo of the hand of suspect number one Lee enhances it and discovers that the suspect is wearing a A. Nigma High championship football ring and has a scab on his mid-knuckle. Realizing that the scab could be gone by tomorrow Lee sneaks out of detention again and tries out for the football team so that he may check the players for scabs. Lee soon discovers that their water boy is a kleptomaniac who stole the ring and a can of paint from Lee's bag.
3	3	"Skate or Die"	Daniel Bryan Franklin & Charles Johnston	September 14, 2011	May 26, 2012
Having failed to find the prankster on the previous day, Lee is at a dead end. Luckily Lee encounters a group of students known as the Skaters who state they were responsible for the paint portion of the Prank and request instructions on more pranks from Lee. Misunderstanding Lee's intentions, they plot to rig the Student of the Week vote to come up as Principal General Barrage and dump the remaining paint on him on live TV along with the host Tina and Chaz. Lee is narrowly able to avert the disaster (as he doesn't want Tina to have paint dumped on her) and in the process learns the email address of the prankster, Radcircles@ANigmahigh.
4	4	"Math Math Revolution"	Emer Connon	September 15, 2011	June 2, 2012
A chance encounter with his old rival, Irwin of the Mathletes, leads Lee to the conclusion that he is Radcircles. Lee sends Holger in during detention to spy on the Mathletes but he is captured and tortured forcing Lee to sneak out to rescue him. Lee confronts Irwin and the latter reveals that while he did send an email to the Skaters, and then some, it was a photoshopped image of himself and Lee to make it look like the latter was picking his nose. In a subplot Cam is attempting to learn the identity of the one who sent the photoshopped image and in the process learns the identity of Radcircles, former principal of A. Nigma High, Principal Wurst.
5	5	"Friday Nights Bites"	Laurie Elliott	September 16, 2011	June 9, 2012
Lee is blackmailed by his self proclaimed girlfriend Brandy who forces him to attend a party of hers or else the fact that he's been sneaking out of detention will be revealed. In order to avoid the wrath of his overbearing mother Lee attends the party. There he learns the identity of those that composed the music for the Prank, the Dudes of Darkness, which has a hypnotic effect on the other party goers. Unfortunately Lee's mother learns from watching the news that Lee was at the party against her strict demands of grounding, getting him into even more trouble.
6	6	"Dudes of Darkness"	Mark Steinberg	February 9, 2012	June 16, 2012
Following the events of last Friday Lee is going to see the Dudes of Darkness to Question them about the Prank. He learns that Cyrus recorded the music during the prank has become consumed by the hypnotic effects of the music becoming obsessed about it. Under the hypnotic effects of the music Cyrus quits the Dudes of Darkness. Biff, easily their biggest fan, is furious with Lee and promises retribution if he fails to reunite the band. Lee uses Barrages voice to snap Cyrus out of the trance in time for him and Lee to blow the crowd away at the battle of the Bands. Once home Lee contemplates listening to the Music to learn any information about the Prank, fearing that he might become consumed by it like Cyrus was.
7	7	"28 Sneezes Later"	Grant Sauvé	February 16, 2012	June 23, 2012
A Nigma High is consumed by a Flu Epidemic, Lee included. Lee's cell phone containing the Prank Song is stolen by the Tazelwurm. Lee chases the Tazelwurm to an underground laboratory, where he learns the Prank Song was developed there. The Tazelwurm gives Lee a folder containing all the information about the Prank. Unfortunately Lee is captured by the Cleaners, is knocked unconscious, and dragged back to detention where he wakes up and writes the experience off as a bad dream. In a Sub plot Holger, Camilio, Brandy, and Chaz are attempting to escape the school before the flu turn them into "Zombies" too, and Principal Barrage does battle with his old enemy "Colonel Von Virus".
8	8	"Disco History Times"	Alex Ganetakos	February 23, 2012	June 30, 2012
Lee receives an email from Radcircles telling him to meet him at the auditions for the annual school play. Disguised as the lead character "Alexander Nigma" Lee arrives on scene and is inadvertently indocturned into the play as the lead character. Facing off against Radcircles in a bizarre game of Cat and Mouse Lee attempts to use the email to contact Radcircles during the play to make him reveal himself unsuccessfully. Brandy, Lee's leading lady, becoming frustrated with Lee, rips his fake beard off, nearly revealing to the crowd his identity. Luckily Biff and Camilio manage to cover for him, and in the process Lee gets back to detention before Barrage dismisses him. While Lee has failed to find Radcircles, he vows to him in an email that he will find him.
9	9	"15th Graders"	Dave Dias	March 1, 2012	July 7, 2012
Lee is given one day of amnesty from detention as per the rules of the Students charter of rights. But he can't enjoy the day off as he's accidentally incurred the wrath of the fearsome 15th graders when he enters their territory chasing a lead. During the brief period of time in which the Tazelwurm had Lee's phone someone programmed in a series of numbers, a locker number and combination. Inside said locker Lee finds his original bag from the day one prank. However Lee has more pressing matters to attend to, he must deal with the 15th Graders or else they will daunt him for the rest of his high school life. Lee is saved from the 15th graders by the Tazelwurm just in time to avoid further grounding from his mother.
10	10	"Welcome to Factory Island"	Grant Sauvé	March 8, 2012	July 14, 2012
Due to an outbreak of Frogs at the school Barrage and Victoria schedule an emergency field trip to the recently reopened Green Apple Splat company for the entire 10th grade. There a melt down is triggered by some of the students, inadvertently locking the students inside the factory. Barrage and Lee are able to work together to not only save the class from the melt-down but also the fearsome cyborg tazelwurms living inside the factory. In a side plot Lee discovers that the Tazelwurm planted a key like device inside his bag which proves vital in the group's survival, and it's discovered that not only did a trio of environmentalists release the frogs at the school and trigger the melt down but they also released them during the Prank, though they aren't connected to the others in the conspiracy.
11	11	"The Tag Along"	Alex Ganetakos	March 22, 2012	July 21, 2012
On a particularly rainy day Lee is surprised to find Holger arriving at school dry as a bone. He explains that during the events of "Friday Nights Bites" Holger discovered a series of tunnels connecting the school and Brandy's apartment. Lee makes his way to the library where the tunnel entrance is supposed to be, though he locates the entrance the fire alarm is pulled forcing Lee to evacuate. The Alarm was pulled by a fan of Lee's work Lynch who ends up in detention with Lee and Biffy. Vice Principal Victoria is planning on renovating the library thus preventing Lee from investigating the tunnels for 2-3 weeks, forcing Lee to allow Lynch to tag along to the tunnels. Once inside Lee finds his father's office and collects a photo of his family in Korea shortly after he was born, though when Lee and Lynch bring Tina back everything is gone. In a subplot, Lee's friends are acting suspicious and are avoiding him, which is revealed to be because they're organizing a surprise party for him, which is ultimately held in the rain.
12	12	"The Down with Lee Club"	Mark Steinberg	March 29, 2012	July 28, 2012
Lee discovers that a "Down with Lee Club" has formed at A. Nigma High as a result of the pranks he pulled in "15th Graders". Worse yet, this Club is now being helped out by Radcircles! Radcircles has a plan to get Lee expelled, to this end Lee is forced to send Camilio in undercover. Camillio discovers that the group is planning a trio of pranks against the staff of A. Nigma high that will unquestionably frame Lee, but it's discovered too late that this is a distraction for the group to steal Barrage's leg and plant it in Lee's locker. Lee and Holger are able to work together to leave the leg somewhere Barrage can find it but away from suspicion.
13	13	"The Hair Incident"	Emer Connon	April 5, 2012	August 4, 2012
Tina runs an embarrassing story on the news in which it is revealed that the Glamazons wear hair extensions, prompting Lee to suspect that they will be seeking revenge. Lee sneaks out of detention and goes to the mall to protect Tina in the process discovering that a bag exactly like his was purchased at the mall. Lee is able to call in Zed to distract the clerk while Holger sneaks in and steals the store's security footage. Lee is able to prevent what appears to have been an attempt by Brandy to poison Tina but in reality is an elaborate scheme to break up her and Brad Von Chillschene. Lee is able to hitch-hike his way back to school in time to be dismissed by Barrage. While at home and after watching incredibly large amounts of footage Holger discovers that the only person to have bought a bag like Lee's was none other than Camillio. In a subplot Biffy reconciles with his childhood friend, Kimmie McAdams, while in Detention.
14	14	"Chaz's Corner"	Daniel Bryan Franklin & Charles Johnston	April 5, 2012	August 11, 2012
Following last episode's cliff hanger Holger has yet to tell Lee about Camillio for fear of breaking up their friendship, instead coming to believe Camillio has been replaced by a robot and setting out to expose him. Lee has more pressing matters to deal with, having discovered that Chaz stole the Prank footage from Day one and is planning on airing it on his upcoming "Chaz's Corner" segment, which contains evidence of his innocence. Barrage begins hunting down the footage promising rewards for anyone who can bring him the Prank Footage. The popular kids meanwhile are trying to find Chaz and destroy the footage, as it contains them doing things they don't want the rest of the school seeing. Lee is able to convince Chaz to air the footage early so that he can watch it, discovering that it was Camillio who switched his bag. At home Lee tries to confront Camillio with the information but is interrupted. He does, however, tell Radcircles that he knows that he's Camillio, who only begins laughing maniacally.

=== Season 2 (2012) ===
No. overall	No. in season	Title	Written by	Canadian air date	Australian air date
15	1	"If the Shoe Fits"	Dave Dias	September 6, 2012	August 31, 2012
Lee's popularity has slipped and Cam is now in the cool crowd. Chaz get suspended from the news desk. However, Vice Principal Victoria is attending the party to talk with the grown-up. Lee manages to steal one of Cam's shoes but couldn't make it back to detention, since Barrage knows that he sneaks out of detention, unaware of the air vents. Unexpectedly, Vice Principal Victoria picks him up, spares him for sneaking out of detention and drives him back to detention, she tells Barrage that she let him out so he can help her carry books and tells Lee not to let it happen again. Lee finds out that Cam's shoes fit the shoe print from the rafters, unfortunately for him, Holger and Cam aren't speaking to him again, since they think he cares more about the prank and the mysterious Radcircles rather than them. Cam claims that in the prank Lees bag fell and he put back up on the chair. He also told Lee that he brought a bag like Lees because it looked cool, and when Lee had the same one he gave it to his sister. Lee is still unsure whether Cam was hypnotised during the prank as he acts like a monkey when someone says 'butterscotch' so he might have been hypnotised.
16	2	"The Cam-didate"	Emer Connon	September 13, 2012	September 3, 2012
Holger forces Lee to run for president because he thinks it will get even with Lee and Cam. When Lee hears that if he wins he can get out of detention for good, he takes the vote seriously. Biffy helps Lee humiliate Cam as Kimmie helps Cam humiliate Lee, Holger makes everything worse by accidentally making Cam think about tell everyone about Lee's crush on Tina Kwee during the vote. Unaware of his plan, Lee plans to use the word "butterscotch" to hypnotise Cam in front of the school, but will use it if his plan is worse. At the election, Cam tells the school about Lee's crush on Tina (who thinks it's a lie), Lee retaliates and hypnotises Cam. Cam acts like a monkey and climbs onto the rafters as Lee follows, and Lee realises that he must have been hypnotised during the prank. Lee apologizes to Cam about the prank and Cam is eventually elected as class president.
17	3	"Outcast Times at A. Nigma High"	Mark Steinberg	September 20, 2012	September 4, 2012
The Outcasts to get a whisker from the red tazelwurm to cure their "curse" (being unpopular to the other students), as Lee and his friends help them. They discover a pyramid under the cafeteria, which is protected by a large group of blue tazulwurms and are saved by the tazulwurm. Lee discovers the Outcasts were not responsible for the hypnosis of Cam. At home, Lee discovers a photo of his 10th birthday and finds out that Biffy was at the party.
18	4	"Double Date"	Daniel Bryan Franklin & Charles Johnston	September 27, 2012	September 5, 2012
Lee is forced to bring Brandy on a mission to track Biffy, who he needs to question about his 10th birthday and has been avoiding him. They are forced to bring Holger and a Mathlete, Greta, who are having a date. Lee and Brandy find Biffy at a building whose logo resembles the symbols on the materials used in the prank. Biffy turns out to be visiting his parents, who own the building. He also reveals that he didn't know about Cam's hypnosis. Lee has no other choice than to find out what happened to the Amazing Finnwich.
19	5	"Mastermind"	Grant Sauvé	October 4, 2012	September 6, 2012
Tina's younger (and for some reason, smarter) sister Ruby turns herself in because she was behind the prank. Lee tries to find out if she is involved in the prank and Tina investigates whether she is involved in the prank or used by Lee (in her words). Cam helps Lee track down the real Radcircle and eventually bumps into the figure, dropping Radcircle's phone in the process. Ruby confesses to Tina and Lee that she wasn't involved in the prank and wanted detention so she can't go to university. Lee is then given Radcircle's phone and detention from Barrage back. Lee charges Radcircle's phone, he can't wait to use it to find out who he is. The episode ends with Lee leaving his room for dinner and Radcircle's phone being fully charged and is locked.
20	6	"Finding Finnwich"	Mark Steinberg	October 11, 2012	September 7, 2012
Lee and Cam try to find the Amazing Finnwich at an amusement park. Meanwhile, Holger and Greta witness Biffy and Kimmie on a ride together. Finnwich tells them that he was only fleeing because of a prophecy involving Lee, the "manifestum" who cannot be hypnotized. He eventually deprograms Cam, but when Lee and Cam ask Finnwich why he was talking to Barrage earlier, he disappears. When he gets home, Lee ignores Radcircle's conversation and wants to know if Barrage is working for Radcircles or is Radcircles.
21	7	"School Hard"	Grant Sauvé	October 18, 2012	September 10, 2012
To prepare for the school inspection, Barrage summons the Hazmats to sanitize the school, however, they run loose and sanitize the staff and students as well.Brad, who thinks it's all being filmed for a movie, leads the school witnesses to the library, following Lee's idea. Tina, Cam, Lee and Biffy find out that the Hazmats are robots. They eventually stop the Hazmats and Vice Principal Victoria forces Barrage to deactivate, fix and make the Hazmats 'desanitze' the early victims. Lee feels jealous of Brad kissing Tina and tells Biffy to try harder at cracking Radcircle's phone.
22	8	"A. Nigma Prison Blues"	Emer Connon	November 1, 2012	September 11, 2012
After giving detention to people who have seen the robot Hazmats, including Cam, Tina and Brad, he finds his opportunity to get Brandy to help him school inspector to inspect the school. Their phones are taken custody, including Radcircle's phone, which are taken to be burnt. The schools fails to pass but is given a second chance. Lee eventually retrieves Radcircle's phone and replaces the burnt phones with new ones, given by Vice Principal Victoria from the School Sponsor.
23	9	"Tales from Decrypt"	Dave Dias	November 15, 2012	September 12, 2012
Lee finds out that Barrage is reprogramming the Hazmats, he needs to get a head, fast. He is eventually assisted by the red tazulwurm to find a Hazmat head, sneak in and out to get back to the group. He finds a "Save the Rainforests Dance" poster and a strange machine that plugs into pictures of all the school students. The group find that Barrage doesn't own the Hazmats and the key to hacking Radcircle's phone. The episode ends with Lee preparing to discover the secrets of Radcircles.
24	10	"The Theme Team"	Emer Connon	November 22, 2012	September 13, 2012
Lee leads Victoria to the tunnels, to tell her that she is going to be kidnapped by someone. Victoria tells Lee that she used to be a government officer, whose group was eliminated by Barrage, also a government officer. Victoria tells Lee to frame Barrage so that people think he's evil. Meanwhile, the school tries to propose a theme for the school dance, Tina and Brad suggest a "Save the Rainforests" dance, to make the dance a bit romantic, for Tina (whose secretly planning to dance with Lee). Their idea is ultimately chosen by the school due to the prank song, which hypnotises the students. At home, Lee is told by Cam that Holger is going to the dance with Kimmie.
25	11	"Knock Knock"	Mark Steinberg	November 29, 2012	September 14, 2012
Lee finds that Lynch can track down who's Radcircle and they both go to confront him. While there, Lee gets trapped in a room and Lynch disappears. Radcircles contacts him from a TV in the trap room. Lee escapes and finds lynch's wallet with the address to his home.Lee then starts a search for Lynch. When arriving at Lynch's house, he spots Principal Barrage going into the house using Stealth Mode. Lee sneaks in as well and goes to Lynch's room and hides under the bed. Barrage almost caught him with his eye scanner, but it just missed coming into contact with Lee's skin. Barrage leaves, and Lee crawls out from under the bed. He then notices Lynch's computer, and he finds a video with Radcircles in it. In front of the computer, there was a voice modifier and his billboard is covered by sticky notes which have Knock Knock Jokes written all over it. This indicates that Lynch is Radcircles.
26	12	"The Dance Part 1"	Grant Sauvé	December 6, 2012	September 17, 2012
Cam and Brandy are called to Room 113B, which has never been used as a classroom but as the janitor's closet. It turns out that the room has a secret elevator and a Hypnosis system which leads to the underground room where Lee found the strange plug machine which turns out to be the reason the school (except Lee and Biffy) gets hypnotized. They destroy the machine and escape the room, but Biffy is left behind as he confronts a few Hazmats. The school inspector arrives at the room Cam, Brandy and Lee are in for the school inspection. Lee tries to tell the inspector that Barrage is evil but is rejected and is declared the reason for why the school isn't perfect, so he is expelled. Meanwhile, Lynch who has brainwashed everything about him from every person's memory, plans the school dance to set up a trap. But an unsuspecting Tina feels curious.
27	13	"The Dance Part 2"	Daniel Bryan Franklin & Charles Johnston	December 6, 2012	September 18, 2012
Lynch who plans the school dance, tries to get Lee back from being expelled, since it wasn't part of his plan. Tina, who reveals that she has fallen in love with Lee, comes to rescue Lee and tells her everything that has happened. They go underground to try stop Barrage but Vice Principal Victoria reveals that she is responsible for the hypnotizing of the school so she can use the strategy to take over the world and even captures Barrage, with the help of the Hazmats. Lee is only chosen as the target because he's immune to the hypnosis, unaware that Biffy is too. Lee and Tina escape, Barrage is beaten by Victoria's soldiers as she starts the dance. Lynch reveals to Lee that he only wanted to prank him so he can play with him, since he's a loner. Lee and Tina go to the dance and stop Victoria, with the help of Biffy, Cam, Brandy and Holger, by getting everyone to throw their phones and break them as they dance. Victoria is taken by a council whom Victoria fails to impress, using the strategy. A member of the council hypnotizes everyone, including Tina, into forgetting everything that happened, except the dance, and congratulates Lee for being helpful to the council before she leaves. The dance continues and Lee manages ask Tina to the dance. The episode ends with a mysterious figure pulling off the prank again.

=== Season 3 (2013) ===
No. overall	No. in season	Title	Written by	Canadian air date	Australian air date
28	1	"Return of the Ping"	Daniel Bryan Franklin & Charles Johnston	September 5, 2013	June 6, 2013
The episode begins with Barrage of recounting the previous events in the form of an interrogation by an off-screen woman, who orders her men to wipe his memory. Meanwhile, at the Save the Rainforest Dance, Brad pulls off the second prank so he can be a hero instead of Lee, only for Lee to get blamed, expelled and have his mother send him to Alaska. On the way to the airport, he is abducted by a Hazmat and escapes with the help of the Tatzelwurm. He decides to find Barrage to clear out his name and return to A.Nigma High, only to find that Superintendent Blompkins, the school inspector, is now the principal. Lee points out that Blompkins can't detain him as he is no longer a student. Brad is named the new Prank Master, boasting about how much better his prank was. An annoyed Tina points out he'd have detention for two years as it was so much better, causing Brad to quickly back-pedal on his confession. Blompkins takes away everyone's phones and makes them wear clogs. With the help of Biffy, Cam and Holger to find Barrage's whereabouts; Lee finds that the secret tunnels that Barrage was last seen at had been cleared out, and Cam finds Barrage's ID and money, while Lee tries to find the security tapes. Blompkins catches Lee and Mrs Ping at the parking lot and begins expressing his disgust of Lee. Blompkins then receives a telegram and immediately states that Lee can stay at A.Nigma High. At home, Cam informs Lee that Barrage's ID also has his address and they plan to find him.
29	2	"Clogspiracy"	Grant Sauvé	September 12, 2013	June 7, 2013
Superintendent Blomptkins makes the students not wearing clogs submit to woodworking class, where they are forced to make their own clogs. Lee and Cam go to Barrage's house, where the Hazmats take the house away on a truck to a hidden archive. There they find Barrage's old computer but it is broken during a chase, the hard-drive is salvaged. Meanwhile, Biffy and a curious Kimmie sneak into his parents' workplace, but other Hazmats have already removed most everything and are about to demolish it. There they find out that Kimmie's mother owns the company his parents work in, Biffy recognizes her mother as the person who congratulated Lee at the dance. They both escape before the demolition. Back at school, Tina refuses to make clogs and Holger, after a failed attempt to join the cheerleaders, burns his own pair when he dances. They are put in a clog-like cage, "The Mega-Clog", and Lee and Cam find themselves guided by the Tatzelwurm to beneath the woodworking class. They help the students escape to the library but Lee is caught. Mrs Ping catches Blompkins attempting to punish Lee with a clog-launcher, which results in a "clog-gun" fight where Mrs Ping ultimately wins. Blompkins is fired, and Tina and Holger are released by Lee. At home, Lee finds an image of a submarine in the hard-drive. Meanwhile, Kimmie's mother decides to power up Barrage and bring him back as principal.
30	3	"Misadventures in Babysitting"	Emer Connon	September 19, 2013	June 10, 2013
Kimmie's mother, Cassandra, leader of the Parents' Council, visits the school to inform the students that there is no school for the day while the new principal is decided, on one condition; they must take care of their own "robo-baby" with a partner for 24 hours. If the baby's eyes are green, they are good, if red, it is bad, if flashing red, it means it's really bad. Lee fixes the matches so he is with Kimmie, planning to spy on Cassandra. Meanwhile, Cam tries to move Brandy's baby shower party to Kimmie's household to help Lee's investigation. Brandy agrees but Holger, trying make Brandy's place unsuitable for a party, makes all the robo-babies' eyes flash red and vomit goo, causing everyone to go home. At Kimmie's house, Lee tries to spy on Cassandra while Biffy distracts her. Lee finds a secret passage where he witnesses a Council meeting about Barrage, during which he smells rotten eggs. Lee is caught by Kimmie and Cassandra claims that she was never at the dance congratulating Lee. Kimmie kicks Lee and Biffy out, which makes Biffy end his friendship with Lee. Back at home, the robo-babies secretly plant bugging devices in each of their owners' homes.
31	4	"Escape from Fort Nigma"	Lienne Sawatsky & Dan Williams	September 26, 2013	June 11, 2013
Lee and Tina try to figure out a code that he heard in the Parents' Council meeting, while returning the robo-babies. It turns out that Chaz knows what the code means and Barrage has returned as principal, saying he was at Coral Grove on holiday, though he doesn't remember anything about the brainwashing events that occurred before the dance. Barrage takes Lee to the newly improved detention room and challenges him: if he can escape, he is free from his original punishment. Biffy continues to refuse to speak with Lee. Meanwhile, Brad attempts to become more popular than Lee again by using a plan stolen from a movie: stealing Lee's friends' girlfriends, Brandy and Greta, being the first step. Chaz claims that the code is to do with his dad's plane's arrival details. Lee and Tina escape school to find out what is happening while Cam organises a distraction to fool Barrage. Lee and Tina, who is filming the scene, find Cassandra greeting a male council member holding a briefcase with something glowing inside. Lee and Tina are chased by a Reaper Mat, Tina gives up her camera and they arrive just in time to get back to school. After two chances, Lee fails to escape the detention room and his punishment is permanent.
32	5	"The Curse of Earl Nigma"	Mark Steinberg	October 3, 2013	June 12, 2013
Lee overhears Barrage and Cassandra talking about fencing and he assumes that it is to do with the fencing team's losing streak, "the curse of Earl Nigma". Meanwhile, Holger tries to get Greta back from Brad, desperate to become popular, and Cam attempts to cheat in his book review of The Three Musketeers by "buying" a review from Grayson, a genius. Tina helps Lee investigate Barrage's plans as Lee tries out for the fencing team, unexpectedly having good skills. Tina finds that Cassandra was talking about an actual fence around the school than the fencing team. Lee finds that Brad cheats during the fencing tournaments to impress his dad and gets Lee to secretly fill in for him, so he can impress his father. Lee is "enhanced" by the underground pyramid (from "Outcast Times at A.Nigma High") and wins for Brad's father, resulting in Brad respecting Lee for this. Meanwhile, Holger has Greta back and Cam decides to not cheat but the review he bought was taken by a mysterious figure and is given to his teacher, resulting in an "A" for Cam. Lee now has to figure out why a fence had to be built around the school.
33	6	"All That Taz"	Lienne Sawatsky & Dan Williams	October 10, 2013	June 13, 2013
The episode opens with the Parents' Council attempting to unleash the power of the underground pyramid with a key and a mechanical replica. The operation fails and they plan to capture the Tatzelwurm, who stole the other key at the beginning of the series from VP Victoria, so they can unlock the Pyramid's secrets. At school, Barrage offers a free 'A−' if a student captures the Tazelwurm. In an attempt to help Lee help the Tatzelwurm escape, Cam, Holger and Brandy are caught trying to set it free over the gate. They are given the reward and the Tazelwurm is taken to a room in the tunnels. Lee, with the help of Biffy, who still won't forgive him, track down the Tatzelwurm. They find two council members preparing to implant a memory chip to find out where the key is. While the two sneak the Tazelwurm out of school and set it free Biffy finally forgives Lee and they return to being friends. Meanwhile, Brandy gets Cam to convince the two follower Glamazons', McKenzie and Druscilla, boyfriends that Brandy should replace Kimmie as the new leader of the Glamazons, and Holger's attempts to resume his relationship with Greta fail when she becomes a maths tutor to a jock, Steve.
34	7	"Fence-O-Palooza"	Emer Connon	October 17, 2013	June 14, 2013
Lee is sent a message by Lynch to meet at the amusement park. The students protest against the fence around the school and Cam's approval as president slips so he holds a protest concert. With the help of Holger and Biffy, he sneaks out of detention but accidentally traps Biffy and Kimmie, caught spray-painting the fence as part of Biffy's plan, in the detention room. Kimmie will only accept Biffy's apology if he sings it while kneeling before her and being recorded. When Lee sees Lynch, he reveals that he is actually the president of Green Apple Splat, Leopald Webber, and has had surgery to appear younger (but forwent the hair transplant). They are chased by Reaper mats but black robots appear and help Lee escape while fighting the Reaper mats. Meanwhile, Cam gets blackmailed into calling off the party or else the mysterious person will reveal that Cam attempted to cheat in his book report. Cam calls off the concert by convincing the students that the fence is good after all. Lee gets back to detention where he suggests that Kimmie record Biffy's apology, which she does, though the phone was not working as they were inside the detention room door was closed. As Lee wonders how the Council is always a step ahead, the bugging device continues to operate in his room.
35	8	"The Outcasts Strike Back!"	Grant Sauvé	November 7, 2013	June 17, 2013
Lee's key and bag are stolen. Cam and Holger are told to keep Barrage busy and do so by working with him to interrogate suspects for whoever took Lee's bag. Biffy, in detention, begins working on a way to bypass the room's method of blocking phones. Lee sees the Outcasts in the background of school news, with Jenny holding his bag. After asking Tina where Jenny is he follows them down a hole outside to the tunnels. Tina wonders aloud why Lee is asking about Jenny all of a sudden until she realised she is still being filmed. The Outcasts return his things, telling Lee that the Tatzelwurm's whiskers they had were burnt and they were looking for another. The Outcasts didn't bother asking for help as they had grown misanthropic due to their forced ostracism but Lee assures them he'll help them get another whisker, making Jenny smile. Jenny had also found a book in the library they thought might tell them how to use a whisker but the book was locked. A call for backup is broadcast as the blue tatzelwurms attack the council member and his Hazmats at the Pyramid. Lou runs to the fight hoping to get more whiskers, ignoring Lee's warning that they would all be blue tatzelwurms. The Hazmats and the council member, from 'Escape from Fort Nigma', flee as the Pyramid interferes with his control of the 'tatzelborgs'. Lee realises that the two keys unlock something in the pyramid. A blue tatzelwurm attacks Jenny and Lee leaps to help. It attempts to take the book but they overpower it and flee, following Biffy's directions as the red Tatzelwurm joins them. Back at the school the red tatzelwurm gives the outcasts another whisker and unlocks the book with its teeth. At class, Lee and Jenny find that the tattoo on his arm, which he doesn't remember getting, resembles a symbol from the book, which is all in hieroglyphs and symbols. Barrage gives Jenny detention for a week when Holger somehow deduces she took Lee's bag. Though Jenny is happy that they have an opportunity to research the book together in detention, Tina looks on sadly. At home, Lee hides his key under his bed, oblivious to the bugging device above it, still flashing red.
36	9	"Bed Bugged"	Amy Benham	November 14, 2013	June 18, 2013
Lee tries to find a spot in his room to hide the key before exasperatedly saying 'back under the bed'. Kimmie, who has access to Cassandra's bugging devices, spreads embarrassing but mostly true rumors via email about several students, including that Lee is in love with Jenny. When Tina brings it up, Lee assures her it isn't true before joining Jenny, who responds to Tina's presence coldly, in detention. Meanwhile, Cam and Cyrus, a DOD member, are blackmailed into singing a duet together to prevent further threats, otherwise the blackmailer will tell Barrage that they both tried to cheat. Holger's attempt to write a poem to Greta ends with embarrassment when Kimmie sends a transcript around the school. Jenny asks about Lee's relationship with Tina but is interrupted by a call from Holger. Jenny suggests the rumours about Lee and Holger are possible because his room is bugged. Lee realises this is true and runs home to protect the key. The key is gone but his house smells of rotten eggs and Lee finds a male council member, different from the previous one, with his key. Before losing him on the streets, Lee puts the bugging device on the member, so Biffy, who is now at Kimmie's house, can track him down. Lee returns to detention, unable to find the council member, however, when Biffy finds that the member went to a casino called "The Hydra", Lee and Biffy plan to go there and find out what is going on.
37	10	"The Hydra"	Kyle Muir	November 21, 2013	June 19, 2013
Now that Lee lost his key to a council member, Lee and Biffy attempt to go to the casino called, The Hydra, after school to confront him but are caught by Barrage. Cam, Biffy and Holger go to The Hydra in Lee's stead. The council member, referring to himself as "The Serpent", is the owner of The Hydra. They are tricked into a series of games for the key; if they lose they die. Tina finds out about the bugs. Lee, Tina and Jenny find that the council is trying to look for the book, but they manage to hide it. The three of them follow the three present of the five council members to the pyramid, realising that Barrage is being controlled. After losing, the Serpent offers to let Biffy, Cam and Holger live if they answer questions about Lee's age, birthplace and tattoo. None of them know of the tattoo's origins. Ultimately they find that the Serpent has already given the keys to the council. The council's attempt to unlock the pyramid fails and the pyramid zaps a female council member, the Woman Dressed in Black, who falls into a coma and a deep sleep, like the teacher in the detention room, and they decide the book has the key to unlocking it properly. Lee intends to wake up the detention teacher and find out what happened.
38	11	"Fight or Flight"	Emer Connon	November 28, 2013	June 20, 2013
Lee is ordered by Cassandra to draw a map of the tunnels to the pyramid. He doesn't after several failed attempts to wake up the detention teacher and Cassandra threatens to harm his family. Lee's mother, Sue, is at the hair salon, where The Serpent asks questions to her about the Ping family. Lee realizes that it's his father, Alfred, who is being targeted. He witnesses two Reaper Mats and The Serpent attempting to neutralize Alfred. However in the end the Reaper Mats and the Serpent walk away and he realizes the chase was all a waste of time. Also Tina and Jenny find out from the librarian that the book was owned by the Amazing Finnwich. Meanwhile, many other students on a field trip, including Cam and Cyrus, are blackmailed into eating beetles or being expelled from the school. At home, Lee is informed about the book by both Tina and Jenny. Unbeknownst to the Ping family, The Serpent has found their home, as a result of his conversation with Sue.
39	12	"Corndog Day Afternoon"	Amy Benham	December 5, 2013	June 21, 2013
Lee is given a free weekend by his parents, oblivious to The Serpent watching and taking photos of the family, and decides to ask Tina out. An oblivious Tina suggests that they investigate the amusement park for the Amazing Finnwich, without Jenny, who joins them anyway. Meanwhile, the blackmailer strikes again and forces Cam and other students to drop hot soup on their pants. Brandy shows up and encourages them to find a common link. They realise they all used to be in the same class, and plan to investigate old classmates who aren't being blackmailed. At the amusement park, Tina and Jenny are taken by Lynch, but they are saved by Finnwich himself. Finnwich tells Lee and the others that Lynch is now his assistant and is given the book by Lee. Finnwich keeps the book, uses a viewing device to read it, and orders the group to go. At the mall, Biffy and Kimmie decide to humiliate Holger and Steve over their crush on Greta. Now with all three of their hearts broken, Biffy decides to ditch Kimmie and help Holger.
40	13	"Pyramid Scheme"	Kyle Muir	December 12, 2013	June 24, 2013
A rare solar eclipse is coming to A.Nigma High, though some people think it is part of an alien invasion, so they attempt to flee. The parents council try everything they can to open the pyramid but they fail. Lee, Jenny and Holger go to the detention room to wake up the detention teacher. Barrage now finds out that the council had been using him, so he tries to take out a chip but causes himself to malfunction, locked in his controlled state. Finnwich's robots appear from an aircraft and head to the pyramid. Curious, Lee and Tina head to the pyramid via the library as well. A fight between the Hazmats and the robots causes Tina to become crystallized. Lee deduces that the pyramid can only be opened during an eclipse. Finnwich refuses to let him help, insisting it is adult business. At Tina's encouragement, Lee secretly follows anyway. Meanwhile, Cam and his group try to find the blackmailer with the help of Brandy. The group are blackmailed into giving up their roles in the school but Brandy notices a fingerprint on one of the notes. Biffy, thinking that Lee is in the aircraft, goes there and beings remotely controlling a robot to hep Lee. Biffy is attacked by a robot and the aircraft begins to fall. Lee finds a council member with the keys and successfully takes them. Finnwich orders his robots to surround the member. Lynch betrays Finnwich and tries to open the pyramid but falls into a coma as Finnwich had anticipated his betrayal and put his watch forward one minute. Barrage shows up to neutralize Lee but Finnwich turns him off, revealing that he made Barrage himself. The eclipse commences, students run in panic as a light shines through the school and lifts up the detention teacher. His eyes flash a triangle and says "manifestum" and Holger is knocked when he touches the light. The pyramid glows yellow, so Finnwich and Lee insert the keys. Just when they turn the keys, the scene cuts out, "To be continued".

=== Season 4 (2013–14) ===
No. overall	No. in season	Title	Written by	Canadian air date	Australian air date
41	1	"Follow That Finnwich"	Grant Sauvé	January 8, 2015	November 8, 2013
The episode picks up where the previous left off, the pyramid opens revealing symbols. With a device composed of eye-pieces by Earl Nigma, Finnwich is able to see the invisible projections on the symbols, seeing "where it all began". When Lee escapes after being attacked by Hazmats, the Pyramid once again triggering his martial prowess as his tattoo glows, the Council arrives to take Finnwich after he blows up the pyramid, so they can never know its secrets, killing Cassandra's brother, who refused to run, in the process and hides his book and device for Lee to retrieve. Meanwhile, Biffy escapes the falling aircraft, Holger believes he has superpowers (in this case, enhanced stealth abilities and X-ray vision) after waking up from unconsciousness in the detention room with Jenny, Cam and his group attempt to find out whose fingerprint was on the letter and later Tina is freed by Lee. After they all meet up, Tina and Jenny study the book with the device, and Lee, Biffy and Holger proceed to find Finnwich. The boys find a hideout where they see Finnwich, Lynch and the female council member are carried to a submarine to be taken to Coral Grove, where the Council sends people who "know too much". Elsewhere, when the book mentions Coral Grove, Tina proceeds to tell Jenny everything she knows about it (information she gathered during the short webisodes). Grayson tells Cam he cannot find a fingerprint match and all but Cam and Cyrus had quit what they love.
42	2	"Enter the Serpent"	Daniel Bryan Franklin & Charles Johnston	January 12, 2015	November 15, 2013
After witnessing the submarine exit the hideout, Lee, Biffy and Holger decide to leave. Meanwhile, after discussing Coral Grove, Tina and Jenny decide to find Brandy's mother's brochure to find her new username and password to Coral Grove's website as Tina did months before in the webisodes. Cam is still interested in how Chaz got hold of an embarrassing music video that includes him, he claims that he found it on his doorstep. At the school assembly, Mr Wurst, the former principal, returns. Cyrus quits his band in compliance with the blackmail. After discovering Barrage being carried into a tunnel, Lee finds himself separated from Biffy and Holger and trapped by The Serpent, who challenges him to a game: find the single remaining exit before the Serpent finds and captures him. Cam proceeds to go see Mr Wurst and quit the presidency but before he can do so Wurst leaves the school premises. Biffy and Holger escape the hideout and help Lee escape by re-entering via The Serpent's casino. Tina and Jenny go to Brandy's and find the brochure. Lee manages to defeat The Serpent by exposing him to his allergy: fish. Cam shows up to help Biffy and Holger only to find that Lee, Biffy and Holger had just escaped. Cam suspects that Grayson, the student who gave Cam the cheat paper, is the blackmailer when Chaz mentioned squeaks, referring to his wheelchair. The episode ends with The Serpent printing photos of Lee's family, seemingly oblivious to Biffy's phone camera set up in the room.
43	3	"Big Chicken"	Kyle Muir	January 13, 2015	November 22, 2013
The episode begins with the Serpent gathering things used by the Ping family as they sleep. In Tina's room, while respectively trying to access the files of the Coral Grove website and decipher the book, Tina and Jenny admit to each other their feelings for Lee, worrying them about its possible effects on their new, close friendship and resulting in them competing to impress Lee with their findings throughout the day. In the early morning, Lee has a nightmare about choosing between Tina or Jenny. Holger calls Lee about a dream in which Lee is crushed by a giant chicken at 9:30 am. At school, Cam finds Grayson running away from him, but he is called into the Mr Wurst's office as he pursues. Barrage arrives and gives Lee, Biffy, Tina and Jenny detention for being seconds late to class. When Cam tells Mr Wurst about him cheating, Barrage arrives and expels but Wurst insists he is principal and Cam will only be suspended. Wurst and Barrage literally fighting over who is principal and the appropriate punishment. Cam gets Lee and Brandy to find Grayson and turn him in, causing Tina and Jenny to think they're back together, but Grayson escapes. During this, Brandy confronts Lee about his love triangle with Tina and Jenny. Meanwhile, a man supplying chicken for the staff arrives in a chicken costume, causing Holger to attack him. After Wurst and Barrage call a truce and compromise, they suspend Cam and strip him of his presidency. Brandy chastises Lee for not confessing his feelings to Tina, calling him a 'big chicken', and he enthusiastically runs to tell her. Meanwhile, Tina deduces a way to identify which files on the Coral Grove site are about which inmate. Tired and afraid of their love rivalry, Jenny suggests a pact that neither of them ever date Lee for the sake of their friendship and themselves, as Lee is seemingly with Brandi again. Tina agrees right before Lee arrives and privately confesses to her. A horrified and crying Tina turns him down as he's too late and runs away in tears, leaving Lee both heartbroken and confused. While walking to detention, Biffy suggests that Holger's dream referred to Lee's heart getting crushed, with no idea where the chicken came from. The episode ends with Biffy, Lee, Tina and Jenny seated at detention. Tina and Lee sadly look at each other and away, Jenny looks back and forth between the two, confused, and Biffy awkwardly observes the situation as they all remain silent.
44	4	"Splitting Hairs"	Alex Ganetakos	January 14, 2015	November 29, 2013
Tina shows Jenny a photo she found of Barrage, Mr Wurst, Vice Principal Victoria, Jenny's mother, and other school teachers together in the Coral Grove files dressed in lab coats. Jenny's bike gets stolen on her way to school and she accepts a ride from the Serpent. The Serpent sets up a lice outbreak at the school by putting an infected helmet lice on Jenny. At school, Biffy tests Holger's claims to superpowers for his own amusement until Kimmie points out his hypocrisy, while Lee struggles to cope with Tina's rejection by obsessively monitoring the feed of the Serpent's office. The phone's charger is dislodged by the Serpent's snake but Lee finds photos of his family in the office when the camera is moved before the battery runs out. Meanwhile, Cam spends his time watching cable TV during suspension but starts to miss school. Beth, a mathlete, is the new school president as she was the only other candidate (other than Lee) in season 1 but starts to annoy students because of her selfish policies, abuse of power and obsession with wizards. The Serpent appears at the school to get a sample of Lee's hair during the outbreak's screening process. Lee, Biffy and Holger pursue him throughout the school but he escapes, giving Jenny, who is now smitten with him, another ride. During their webcam conversation, Cam suggests the Serpent's gathering of things from Lee's family is related to cloning, or perhaps the Serpent is simply a fan. The episode ends with the Serpent scanning Lee's hair, getting a positive DNA test and discarding Biffy's dead phone. As he looks out towards the city, he declares "I finally found you".
45	5	"Revenge of the Cycle Killers"	Emer Connon	January 15, 2015	December 6, 2013
The episode begins with the Serpent's exposition to the audience instead of Lee's, during which he states he is one of the greatest warriors, has his own mission apart from working with Cassandra and now has all the facts. Lee and Biffy are told by Barrage to burn all the lice-infested furniture in a fire on the field. Lee and Biffy notice that two teachers look a lot like Benjamin Franklin and Mark Twain, making them revisit Cam's clone theory. They ask some jocks to dispose of the furniture and proceed to investigate. Meanwhile, Jenny and Tina meet the Serpent again and they hang out as Tina gracefully leaves them alone, though she is alarmed when Jenny leaves on his motorbike again. He takes her to the woods and leaves her as a storm hits to investigate something in the bushes. Cam is dealing with suspension/being grounded as his little sister bugs him. During the day, Cam has flashbacks of himself being bullied in the past. After being forced by his sister to watch a horror movie with her, Holger arrives to take care of them. Lee and Biffy find files stating that the teachers were born on the same date, February 29th, a leap year, just like Lee's mum. As Biffy finds that the teachers all live in the same condo as Brandy, Lee finds his mum's file but the Tazelwurm arrives, steals it and throws it in the fire. As a surprise, the Serpent arrives and gives Jenny her bike back after it was lost and they go on a ride together to make up for him leaving her afraid. Grayson arrives at Cam's place to apologize for blackmailing him and the others for bullying him when they were younger. Though Cam never actively partook, he seemed to accidentally contribute as every prank on Cam was reflected onto Grayson even worse. At home, Lee video chats with Tina about what happened that day, neither realising it was the Serpent who met Jenny. The episode ends with Tina, upset that she can't further her relationship with Lee due to the pact.
46	6	"The Common Denominator"	Amy Benham	January 19, 2015	December 13, 2013
Brandy tells Cam the "Glamazon Vote", where they vote for a leader, is today and turns down his offer of help due to his reputation declining after losing his presidency. Biffy figures out a way he and Lee can figure out if cloning teachers is taking place: talking to the 15th Graders. The 15th Graders build Beth a trebuchet for her, due to Chopper being attracted to her. Biffy pretends to set up a date after school for Chopper in exchange for some information, some photos of a teacher's weight fluctuations further convincing them of the cloning. Lee and Biffy decide to go to Brandy's apartment building to find the teachers. Brandy has trouble with the vote as the other two Glamazons are too dim and afraid of Kimmie to be persuaded to vote against her. Kimmie subtly tells Brandy she's onto her and Cam eventually goes out to Brandy's place to help. When Lee and Biffy get to the building, they are invited into Mr. Langhorne's room but are knocked out by gas when Langhorne goes to lie down. After waking up to find Langhorne gone, they cover their mouths, lie on the bed and find themselves in a chamber with sleeping teachers in pods. After touching one of them and turning him to dust, activating an alarm, they climb back out. Kimmie is voted the leader again, Cam arriving right after voting ends and Brandy is kicked out of the Glamazons for voting for herself and insulting Kimmie afterwards. The episode ends with Biffy hypothesizing all the teachers may be clones. Lee realises what he is implying and denies his mother is a clone. Biffy points out the recent evidence: they saw teachers in the pods, Langhorne's room smelled like the staff room and the Taz stole the file on Sue Ping. Lee jumps on his parents bed to prove that his mother is not a clone, with nothing happening.
47	7	"Serpent Strike"	Daniel Bryan Franklin & Charles Johnston	January 20, 2015	December 20, 2013
The episode begins with Mr Ping looking at a Lee's childhood drawing that inspired the Eye-robots at the school, he then reveals that he met Sue in Korea and he worked for the Mann, Wurst and Finnwich company, but doesn't want to be the bad guy anymore. Later, the Serpent spies on Mr Ping at the household and declares "reunion time" until Holger shows up. The Serpent receives a call to go after Jenny, which he does. Jenny finds that in the book, she finds an image of a person who looks like Lee. She asks Tina to come and bring Lee, who is helping the family with the house. Mr Ping is taken to the hospital after a fish allergy accident caused by Holger, who plans to make up for it. Biffy is at Kimmie's home, only to be confronted by Cassandra who invites him in for brunch. Brandy is upset about getting kicked out of the Glamazons and Cam tries to cheer her up until he finds Hazmats at her apartment building. Lee and Tina find the Serpent taking Jenny out and go after them. They arrive at The Hyrda, while Cam finds that the Hazmats are clearing out the teachers' apartments. The Serpent actually took Jenny to a picnic prepared and steals the book, leaving Jenny shocked. Lee tells Tina to pick up Jenny while he goes after the Serpent. The Serpent invades the Ping household and interrogates Holger for Mr Ping's location. Lee arrives on the scene and attacks the Serpent, who tells him that Lee's just a "copy" of him, flees and Holger is safe.
48	8	"Mummy Ping and the Snake Man of Evil"	Daniel Bryan Franklin & Charles Johnston	January 21, 2015	December 27, 2013
Holger plans to give Mr Ping a gift basket for the allergy incident at the hospital. Cam is finally back at high school but becomes judged for cheating. He calls Brandy for help who's still stressed after getting kicked out of the Glamazons. When she leaves her apartment, the Hazmats get in and scan fingerprints from Tina and Jenny's visit to be sent to the Serpent, who proceeds to go after Mr Ping. At the hospital, Mr Ping forgives Holger. Meanwhile, Biffy and Lee try to get in the teachers' lounge, Mr Wurst asks Tina for a conversation about Coral Grove and the Serpent arrives at the hospital for Mr Ping, causing Lee to order Holger to hide Mr Ping. Tina is asked by Mr Wurst to show and tell him everything she knows about Coral Grove. Holger's plan to disguise a sleeping Mr Ping works and The Serpent talks a patient he mistakes to be Ping about his past with the Ping parents, until the patient tells he's got the wrong guy. Lee arrives at the hospital and helps Holger, and Biffy finally breaks the code to the lounge. The Serpent takes away Mr Ping after revealing he was also his son. Lee wonders if he's a clone of the Serpent or if the Serpent is his older brother. The episode ends with Mr Wurst sending Tina to Coral Grove for knowing too much.
49	9	"Game of Clones"	Grant Sauvé	January 22, 2015	January 3, 2014
The episode begins with Tina trapped in a Mann, Wurst and Finnwich truck on its way to Coral Grove by Mr Wurst, fearing Jenny is next. Meanwhile, Lee gives Holger one of the keys for protection, and Cam is forced to be in Chaz's talk show. Lee and Holger is caught by Barrage, he gives Holger detention and Lee "something new". Jenny is trying to find Tina, and is tricked into talking with Mr Wurst. Biffy shows Lee the teachers' lounge and try to investigate. Mr Wurst and his clone asks Jenny where the book is otherwise she's taken to Coral Grove with Tina. The teachers act strangely to Barrage's surprise and decides to teach them a lesson. Holger is put in charge of his class, which happens to be where Chaz's Corner is being held. After seeing this, Biffy and Lee decide to get a teacher to trigger the machines in the lounge. Holger takes over the Chaz's show because of Cam's humiliation. Jenny is taken with Tina to Coral Grove. Biffy and Lee trigger the door to the clone room, however Barrage arrives at the lounge with the captured teachers. Barrage knows that the teachers were clones and keeps them in their recharge pods until they're normal, while Biffy and Lee sneak in to the clone room. There they find the teachers' statistics, and that Sue, Lee's mother, is a clone. The episode ends with Tina and Jenny breaking out of their crate, only to find that they're in a submarine.
50	10	"Band of Heroes"	Daniel Bryan Franklin & Charles Johnston	January 26, 2015	January 10, 2014
Lee and Biffy go to Lee's place, only to find that the Serpent has arrived before they are knocked unconscious and wake up at Biffy's place. Meanwhile, the teacher clones wake up in the broken clone room, now realizing they're clones of other famous people (with Sue, Lee's mother, wonders who she exactly is a clone of), while Barrage tries to get them out with the help of the Mr Wurst clones. Due to this, all the students are given an exam to do until the teachers are back. Biffy, Cam and Holger fight over who gets to have the second key. Biffy is called by Kimmie to go to her house, only to find that Cassandra going out on a "vacation" with Kimmie, and Biffy is kidnapped by her soldiers. Lee goes to investigate where Tina and Jenny are when he sees The Council's soldiers (including one with Finnwich's book) and follows them, while Cam and Holger are knocked unconscious and taken away. Lee finds the Tazelwurm, whose actions are now unexplainable, and sees Cam and Holger getting taken away. With the Taz's help, Lee sneaks to follow where they are taken. Lee sees Cam, Holger and Biffy getting taken away by Cassandra's soldiers, while Cassandra takes an oblivious Kimmie into the a submarine. The Serpent arrives to reveal that he is on Lee's side now and releases the three friends. Lee and the three flee to the Serpent's hideout, while the Serpent takes out Cassandra' soldiers. However, Cassandra arrives in a high-tech fighting suit and the two engage in a fight, while the four friends watch from the hideout. During the fight, they reveal that the Serpent is in fact a Ping relative, and Cassandra raised and trained him on her side, before she and her men take him into the submarine to Coral Grove. The episode ends with Cassandra revealing that Tina and Jenny are already at Coral Grove, much to Lee's shock.
51	11	"From Bad to Wurst"	Grant Sauvé	January 28, 2015	January 17, 2014
Following the previous episode, the Serpent is now imprisoned on the submarine and Cassandra orders the Hazmats to capture Lee and the gang. Meanwhile, the teachers, now saved, want answers from the Mr Wurst clones, who uses an old video to explain that they are clones, and that they were created to help the Parents Council open the pyramid. Tina and Jenny are interrogated by Mr Wurst clones at Coral Grove using advanced lie detectors. Lee and the gang sneak into the submarine by letting Cam distract the Hazmats, but accidentally breaks his phone when Brandy calls him, and the submarine takes off. The teachers act weirdly, forcing the students to put together pieces of the pyramid, and Brandy is approached by Cam to help Lee before he explains everything. During the conversation, Brandy kisses Cam to avoid suspicion from Barrage. Mr Wurst now has the location of Finnwich's cypher (used to read the book and the pyramid), thanks to Tina and Jenny, and sends another of his clones to find it, unaware of Brandy and Cam planning to stop him. Lee and the gang arrive at Coral Grove, and overhears Cassandra ordering a Wurst clone to intensify the interrogation. Cam and Brandy are caught by Wurst clone, who gets hold of the cypher and the second key, and the two are taken to the pyramid's original location to put together the pyramid pieces with the other students. Lee and the gang arrive at the prison floor to rescue Tina and Jenny and find that Vice Principal Victoria is also a prisoner. Barrage objects to the Wurst clones' doings, who respond by crystallizing him. The episode ends with Coral Grove under prison lockdown after Lee and the gang rescue Tina and Jenny.
52	12	"Mannifestum Rising"	Amy Benham	January 29, 2015	January 24, 2014
The episode begins with Finnwich, in a luxurious room in Coral Grove (with the comatose Lynch and female council member), talks to himself about how his friend Alexander Nigma (founder of the school) had once found himself inside the pyramid to get answers about the book but died. Nigma left a note for Finnwich that told him to rip out a page from the book that revealed that they were foreseeing "the end of the world". Cassandra arrives at the scene and orders Finnwich to give her answers about the pyramid, and Lee and his family, by the next day. When she leaves, Finnwich wakes up Lynch. Meanwhile, Lee and the gang plan to break out of the cell when dinner is brought to the cell. Back at the pyramid's location, the students are informed by the Wurst clones that they can't leave until construction is done. Cassandra, now revealed to be granddaughter of Elizabeth Mann (one of the founders of Mann, Wurst and Finnwich), is approached by a council member, a large lizard-like humanoid who speaks, only for her to order him to give her answers about the Ping family, why they're so important, and MWF's true purpose. The Council Leader tells her that Lee's grandfather was a fourth founder, and that Nigma, the four, and the Red Taz were involved in another pyramid discovery, which also involved the discovery within the pyramid: the Council Leader, who trapped Nigma and marked the other four with permanent scars that are hereditary. Lee and the gang finally break out thanks to Lynch, who was sent by Finnwich but they don't believe him and leaves him to be chased by Reaper Mats as the gang sneaks back on the submarine to the school. The students distract the teachers so they can let Cam and Brandy out, who find Barrage. The episode ends with Lynch, free from the Reaper Mats, controlling the submarine to get back to Coral Grove so Finnwich can see Lee, and reveals to them that Lee's real non-clone mother is also there.
53	13	"Date with Destiny"	Daniel Bryan Franklin & Charles Johnston	January 29, 2015	January 31, 2014
The gang are brought back by Lynch so Lee can see Finnwich, but Lee plans to find his mother first. Meanwhile, Cam and Brandy decrystallize Barrage, but they are caught by a Wurst clone afterwards, and they eventually escape and decide to fight back at the Wurst clones. Back at Coral Grove, the Council Leader reveals he was one of the last of his ancient race of Reptilians, and that the pyramid was to reserve his race. The markings meant great power, and that the Council Leader plans to take over the Earth by creating the most powerful company on Earth, MWF, but Lee's grandfather intervened and learned that his family could be responsible for the success of the invasion, so he hid. Cassandra intervenes with his plans but she and Kimmie are taken to the prison floor by his soldiers. The gang believe that Lynch can't be trusted, so Tina leaves herself behind to guard him. Biffy sees his parents and goes after them. Lee and Jenny find Sue, Lee's mother, but the Council Leader intervenes. Cassandra escapes from the soldiers and releases the Serpent to help her and Kimmie survive. Before the Council Leader can explain more to Lee and after releasing Sue, Cassandra takes over the operations of Coral Grove before she crystallizes the Serpent. During the battle at school, Barrage malfunctions and Brandy is crystallized. Tina arrives back with the rest of the gang with Lynch, and they go see Finnwich. Finnwich plans to kill both Lee and himself because they are too important to this conspiracy. The Council Leader and stops this, and Lee and Tina finally kiss, not before the Council Leader retrieves the key from Lee. Cam stops all the Wurst clones, but blue Tazes arrive and the Red Taz shows up to stop them. Cassandra and Kimmie arrive at the scene and crystallizes the Council Leader and reveals that she plans to open the pyramid so she could sell the Reptilians' technology. However, Kimmie crystallizes Cassandra and Finnwich stops the blue Tazes. Everyone embraces and reconcile now that the conspiracies are over, but leaving the fate of everyone else involved (Cam and Brandy, the school students, the clone teachers, the Serpent and Alfred Ping) unknown. However, in the end, the council member who was presumed dead in Season 3 is seen with even more Reptilians, leading them out of the Pyramid, ending the series on a cliffhanger.
