= Detentionaire =

2011 Canadian television series

- Genre: Mystery; Thriller; Sci-fi; Action-adventure; Comedy drama
- Created by: Daniel Bryan Franklin; Charles Johnston
- Developed by: Daniel Bryan Franklin; Charles Johnston
- Directed by: Kevin Micallef
- Voices of: Jonathan Tan; Ryan Belleville; Fab Filippo; Zachary Bennett; Seán Cullen; Krystal Meadows
- Composers: Asher Lenz; Stephen Skratt
- Country of origin: Canada
- Original language: English
- No. of seasons: 4
- No. of episodes: 53 (list of episodes)

Production
- Executive producers: Daniel Bryan Franklin; Charles Johnston; Doug Murphy
- Producers: Tracey Dodokin; Jane Crawford
- Running time: 22 minutes
- Production company: Nelvana

Original release
- Network: Teletoon
- Release: September 12, 2011 – January 29, 2015

Detentionaire is a Canadian mystery thriller animated series produced by Nelvana and aired on Teletoon from September 12, 2011, to January 29, 2015, for total of 53 episodes, spanning 4 seasons. It was created by Daniel Bryan Franklin and Charles Johnston and produced by Tracey Dodokin. It currently airs reruns on Boomerang in Canada. It also aired on Pop Max in the United Kingdom.

== Plot ==
The story revolves around high school student Lee Ping, a teenager who on his first day of 10th grade is framed for a major prank and punished with a full year of detention. Every day with the help of his friends, Lee sneaks out of detention to try to find who was really behind the prank, all while trying to avoid being caught by the school's principal, Barrage. In his quest to clear his name, Lee uncovers a conspiracy within the school that is tied to his family.

== Characters ==
=== Main ===
- Lee Ping (voiced by Jonathan Tan) is the main protagonist of the series. He was born in Korea and raised in Canada and is a straight-A student, except for a C in gym class. On his first day of school, he is framed for a mind-blowing prank and receives detention for one full year and grounded for the same length of time by his mother. Every day since he sneaks out of detention to collect evidence to clear his name. It turns out that he has a crush on Tina Kwee since the Fifth Grade. His first name is common in the West and his surname is an actual Korean family name under the McCune-Reischauer romanization; his full name is mistaken for the word "leaping" in the first few episodes by Brandy Silver.
- Camillio "Cam" Martinez (voiced by Fabrizio "Fab" Filippo) is Lee's childhood best friend. Though he is loyal to Lee and helps with his endeavors when he can, he'd just as soon ride Lee's newfound wave of popularity as long as it lasts (as being blamed for the prank had made Lee the most popular student in school). Cam shows a rather strong interest in finding a girlfriend, which drives his motivation to try to keep Lee from openly denying his status as the prank perpetrator, as Lee's fame helps Cam score attention with girls. It is hinted he has a crush on Lee's girlfriend Brandy; they went to a concert together with Holger and his date. In "The Curse of Earl Nigma", Cam buys a finished book report from a genius and ends up getting blackmailed by an unknown person.
- Holger Holgaart (voiced by Ryan Belleville) is Lee's overly loyal friend and A. Nigma High's Scandinavian exchange student. Though he appears and acts incompetent in all things, on occasion having to be bailed out of trouble by his friends, the value of his few skills has proven to exceed his incompetence. He has proven to be stealthy, easily running circles around Barrage, and his knowledge of spa and cooking gets him the position of waterboy, which he used to find out whose hand was in a picture of someone messing with Lee's bag. He has a crush on the uni-browed mathlete Greta, who likes him back.
- Bifford "Biffy" T. Goldstein (voiced by Zachary Bennett) is a gentle giant with a soft spot for his "Rumple Kitty Cat". Biffy helps Lee for his own reasons, using his technological savvy, ingenuity, and intimate knowledge about the school to guide Lee and track people of interest throughout the school. Despite Biffy helping him on numerous occasions, Lee remains afraid of him throughout much of the first season. His favourite band is the Dudes of Darkness, and he loves a good rock tune. Later on, it is hinted that he and Kimmie knew each other, and (in the present) might have a "thing" for each other. In later episodes, he often shows compassion to Holger, who is riddled with misfortune.
- Principal General Wendell Barrage (voiced by Seán Cullen) is the new principal of A. Nigma High, a former Black Ops general with a classified pass and a war amputee with cybernetic parts. He has a no-nonsense attitude and is ruthless in all things. He firmly believes that Lee Ping was responsible for the prank and drags him to detention at every available moment. Barrage is not shy about his experience in the military, taking much of his enjoyment, standards, and training methods with him to the school. He holds the football tryouts using artillery cannons to throw the balls at the new "recruits". He is easily distracted by things military-related, as he confiscated a phone which at the time had a game playing on it involving tanks, which distracted Barrage for most of Lee's detention period.
- Tina Kwee (voiced by Krystal Meadows) is another childhood friend of Lee, and his secret crush. She's one of the school's news reporters and shows a strong passion for it, but her rivalry with her senior school reporter Chaz Moneranian tends to make it harder for her to get what she wants. She also helps Lee and his friends, as she helped find the owner of the e-mail address which sent the e-mails to different people who participated in the prank. She is also out to unravel the mystery of A. Nigma High's growing list of missing teachers and staff (all being replaced by Barrage) shown in a series of shorts that were available exclusively on Teletoon's website.
- The Tazelwurm is a red lizard-like creature that serves as the mascot of the school. It is usually seen either chained to the ground, being chased by Principal Barrage's "cleaner freaks", or crawling through the school vents. In "28 Sneezes Later", it is revealed that the Tazelwurm is highly intelligent and knows about what happened on the day of the prank. It gives Lee a file containing all the information regarding the prank, and even information regarding Lee's own past which appears to be intertwined with the prank. It later helps Lee on numerous occasions, which leads to Lee calling it 'Taz'. "Tazelwurm" comes from a Bavarian mythical animal, the Tatzelwurm, which is supposed to have the front of a cat and the hind of a lizard with no hind legs.
- Brandy Silver (voiced by Melanie Leishman) is bossy and popular. She told Lee that she was his girlfriend after the prank and Lee was her first kiss (episode 3). She is in the clique of Glamazons who think Brandy is not always what a 'Glamazon Girl' should be. She has blackmailed Lee a few times, threatening to tell Barrage that Lee has been sneaking out of detention. She doesn't like Tina because she knows that Lee likes her. She cares about her appearance and popularity and is commonly seen in the hallways ordering people around or putting them down, but she does seem to have a kind heart. She later gives up on Lee and starts a relationship with Cam.
- Chaz Monarainian (voiced by David Berni) is Tina's competition and co-anchor on the school's news program. He continually pushes Tina out of the camera and reads out her share of news. Chaz hosts his own show called 'Chaz's Corner'. He is self-absorbed, obsesses about his appearance, and likes to hog the camera. He had footage of the prank, which Lee obtains to discover who switched his bag. He is also scared of getting sick and having messy hair. He has flirted with 'Glamazon' Queen Kimmie. His father (seen in episode 5) is also a news presenter.
- Jenny Jerkins (voiced by Stacey DePass) is one of the Outcasts, who are cursed with repulsive habits (later revealed to be due to brainwashing experiments), hers being chronic nose-picking. Originally introduced as a minor character, Jenny gets promoted to the main cast later in the series. After witnessing Lee risk his life to save her and her friends, she feels immense gratitude and develops a crush on him, later becoming a part of Lee's team. Due to Lee's relationship with Tina, Jenny initially showed immense hostility towards her but the two gradually become friends after learning to work together.

=== Villains ===
- Lynch Webber (voice by Brian Froud) is the main antagonist of the first two seasons, Lynch runs the school server system. At the beginning of the series, he seems to worship Lee and tries to be cool like him. He loves peanuts and leaves a trail of them behind him. Lee initially thought his dad owned Green Apple Splat, but it was revealed that Lynch is an adult who has had surgery to make him look younger, and actually owns the company. His alias is Radcircles, the person who framed Lee for the prank.
- Vice Principal Veronica Victoria (voiced by Hélène Joy) is an attractive young woman who seems mysterious, Victoria is the Vice-Principal of A. Nigma High and is much more understanding and calm than Principal Barrage. She was fired at the end of Season 2/Series 1, though she was shown at Coral Grove in the last couple of episodes.
- Cassandra Mann McAdams (voiced by Julie Lemieux) is the co-main antagonist of seasons 3 and 4. She is the head of the evil parent's council, a business magnate of great power, and Kimmie's mother. After Victoria is fired, Barrage was sent to 'Coral Grove' where Cassandra hacked into Barrage's cybernetics so she could control him.
- Li "The Serpent" Ping (voiced by Karl Ang) is the co-main antagonist of the first half of season 4. The Serpent is a mysterious man of seemingly Asian descent who has a striking resemblance to Lee Ping. In earlier seasons he is often seen secretly watching or photographing other characters. He owns a pet snake named Priscilla. He has clashed with Lee and his friends on numerous occasions, and enjoys tormenting others, such as tying Holger in a chair and threatening to cut his hair. He often threatens to feed people to Priscilla. Lee views him as his nemesis, while the Serpent views Lee as an inferior copy of him. He also sees his battles with Lee as a game of "cat-and-mouse", going so far as to call Lee "Mr. Lee-Mouse-Ping". During early appearances, Lee calls him the "Stink Ninja" because of his ninja-like ability to disappear, and his pungent odor of rotten eggs (revealed to be from the necklace he wears). He has also seduced Jenny Jerkins and posed as her boyfriend to exploit her. It was initially implied that he is Dr. Ping and Sue's secret son, explaining his resemblance to Lee, the birthmark (covered up by a tattoo they both have), and being allergic to fish just as Dr. Ping is. This was later confirmed, along with the revelation that he was kidnapped by Cassandra and raised to be a vengeful assassin. He later reforms, rebelling against his previous masters and aiding Lee and his friends.
- The Leader: Also called His Eminence, the Leader is the mysterious head of the council and the true antagonist of the series. He is an immortal humanoid reptilian creature from an ancient civilization who wanted his race to become the dominant race, but he is betrayed by Cassandra.
- Radcircles: the mysterious person who set Lee up for the prank

=== Supporting ===
- Hazmats - Nicknamed Psycho Cleaner Freaks, the Hazmats act as Barrage's minions and maintain order around the school. Their speech resembles an electronic speech synthesis and the sound of swarming bees. They are later revealed to be robots, and have a much greater role than just being school cleaners, taking orders from a greater evil. They are sometimes used to make a person "disappear", clearing every belonging out of their house and moving it away.
- There are also different types of Hazmats:
  - Steam Mats: 'Good' Hazmats which serve Finnwich
  - Green Hazmats: Gigantic green Hazmats that carry scythes. They are more potent than standard white Hazmats and are typically used to guard important things.
  - Fancy Bots: Blue, hovering Hazmats that can emit an energy pulse that knocks people out, as well as firing an energy field that can suspend people in the air. They also guard Coral Grove.
- Sue Ping (Marjorie Chan) is Lee's strict mother who is also a math teacher at his school, and the one who grounds him. She does not always abide by the rules and will rebel against regulations if she feels it isn't right, as shown when she stands up to insane Principal Blompkins and engages in a clog-cannon battle with him. Despite her harsh exterior and her menacing accent, deep down she cares for Lee. It is revealed that she, along with every other teacher, is a clone. While all other teachers are clones of intelligent figures in history, such as Benjamin Franklin and Albert Einstein, she is a clone of the actual Mrs. Ping, whose birth name is Shi-hoo Kim. Lee is later reunited with his original non-clone mother.
- Dr. Alfred Ping is Lee's father and Sue's husband, who unlike his wife is more liberal with Lee. He has a secret past involving being hunted and constantly on the run. He is somehow tied with the Council who were his former allies, but were revealed to be evil.
- Irwin Dexter - (voiced by Lyon Smith) is Lee's self-proclaimed arch-rival and former Mathlete teammate. He feels that Lee betrayed them and is jealous of how Lee has all their smarts, but still gets popularity. He makes constant attempts to thwart Lee's reputation to no avail, and Lee mostly views him as a nuisance.
- Cyrus Xavier (Dan Petronijevic) is the lead singer of the Dudes of Darkness. Cyrus wears an oversized hat that obscures his eyes, always carries around his guitar, and is known to randomly break into song. He was first introduced as the missing band member of the Dudes of Darkness due to being hypnotized by the prank song, but Lee helps him break free. In later episodes, many students around the school are anonymously blackmailed to do humiliating dares. Cyrus and Cam discover this and they team up to try to take down the blackmailer, but the blackmailer, who is one step ahead, makes them perform dares together. They later find other students who are also being blackmailed and join forces with them to take down the blackmailer.
- Dr. Finnwich (voiced by Paul Soles) is a mysterious man with alleged "magic", who Lee spends the first few seasons seeking. It is revealed he was one of the original four to encounter "The Leader" and be tagged by him, along with Mann, Wurst, and Ping (Lee's grandfather Lo). He is responsible for many of the odd events that occurred, such as rejuvenating Lynch and cybernetically enhancing Barrage.
- Niles Pegg - This teacher is always seen sleeping in the detention room. It is later revealed that he took the strange book and attempted to open the "Pyramid of Doom", but failed (due to not doing so during an eclipse), which rendered him in his comatose state.
- Ruby Kwee (voiced by Kristin Fairlie) is Tina's 11-year-old sister who is a grade above her. She is a member of the geniuses.

=== Cliques ===
- Detentionaires is a term coined by Barrage to refer to students who are regulars in the detention room. They mainly consist of Lee Ping, Biffy Goldstein, and later on Jenny Jerkins and Tina Kwee.
- The Jocks are a group of big strong guys with small brains. They are popular and go out with the cheerleaders and Glamazons. Their leader is Steve, who originally hated Lee as he considered him a rival for team captain, but after Lee found his beloved towel he became Lee's ally. Ed was formerly the Waterboy for the team, who suffered from kleptomania and was unmasked as the school thief. Holger auditioned for his position of Waterboy and won so he was fired. He is a member of the Down With Lee Club and harbors a deep hatred for Holger.
- The Glamazons are a group of four girls that are popular, pretty, and glamorous. Their leader is a rich girl named Kimmie who looks down on everyone. Brandy is the newest member of this group and Kimmie doesn't always think she belongs in her group. They are mean and snooty to less popular students and tease people about their appearances e.g. Tina's hair. Kimmie seems to have had a childhood friendship with Biffy.
- The Skaters have short attention spans and no patience. They don't care about learning and love to cause trouble, setting up the paint part of the prank. Their leader is Zed (Christian Potenza).
- The Emos write poetry and don't talk much. Joseph ( a.k.a. Emo Joe) is the only member that speaks and is in the "Down With Lee Club" due to getting blamed for the food fight Lee started. The girls wear heavy makeup and the guys wear guyliner. Joseph works at a store in the mall, where a bag identical to Lee's was bought for the prank. They do not like Holger or Lee.
- The Mathletes are four math whizzes who all wear sweaters with math operations on them (− × ÷ and π symbols). They are led by Irwin, Lee's arch-enemy, although Lee seems to be better at math than him. Greta, a member of this group, has a relationship with Holger for the first two seasons.
- The Dudes of Darkness are a rock band with four members. Their whole life is music, although they hate techno music. Cyrus, the leader of the band, gave Lee the prank song that has strange hypnotizing powers.
- The Greenies are tree-huggers who are against animal cruelty. They were responsible for the frogs in the prank, as they were trying to free them during the first-day assembly, but the frogs escaped into the school hall.
- The Outcasts are the school's most unpopular students and former friends of Lee Ping. They are ostracized because of their unusual habits. They are Lou (a thumb-sucker), Deuce (who eats gross things), and Jenny (a nose-picker). It is implied that their habits are the result of being brainwashed after testing the prank song. Lee helps them get a Red Tazelwurm whisker to help lift their curse, but they accidentally burn it.
- The Down With Lee Club are a group of students who want to get revenge on Lee Ping for getting them all in trouble and sending them to detention.
- The Geniuses are a group that works in a secret passage in the library. They are (unofficially) led by Irwin Dexter. They include Tina's sister Ruby, Grayson, who is in a wheelchair, an unnamed 9th grader, and Nadene, a black girl who wears a hoodie and breakdances.
- The Cheerleaders are the cheerleaders of A. Nigma High. Three of them are usually seen together giggling. Camillio has a crush on Toni, a tall black one.
- The Fifteenth Graders are a group of older students led by Chopper, who have not graduated from high school and love beating up younger students. They hang out in the shop classroom (best described as a garage), where they work on fixing up cars. It was in their hallway, in the only non-destroyed locker, that Lee's original bag was hidden. Lee had been directed and given the combination to this locker by the Tazelwurm. Whenever someone goes into the fifteenth graders' hallway, they torment the school, then beat up the student who entered their hallway after school. One of the fifteenth graders, Stinky, dreams of one day going to clown school and becoming a clown. Lee eventually gets on the Fifteenth Graders' good side by helping their Chopper get a date with Beth from the Mathletes.

== Episodes ==
The show consists of 4 seasons of 13 episodes each, except for the first one which contains 14 due to including the pilot episode. Both Canadian and Australian airdates are provided; all seasons except the first one aired in Australia prior to airing in Canada.

== Production ==
The development of the pilot episode was announced on September 21, 2009. As of October that year, 26 episodes were scheduled to be produced with a budget of US$275,000–325,000 per episode; production of the pilot was set to begin in spring 2010.

The series was inspired by the school experiences of the creators, particularly in depicting various cultural backgrounds and dealing with school rules and restrictions. A major focus of the show was the defiance of stereotypes, especially those regarding cliquishness.

For season 4, a very different concept for the plot was initially created than that which was eventually produced, with a prominent role for the character of Niles Peg and a special title for Lee.

== Reception ==
The series has been reviewed by Strange Kids Club and Toon Zone, with the former also conducting interviews with both of the co-creators.

=== Awards and nominations ===
Year	Association	Category	Nominee	Result	Ref.
2013	Canadian Screen Awards	Best Sound in a Comedy, Variety or Performing Arts Program or Series	Michael Mancuso, Sean Pearson, Dante Winkler and Scott McCrorie for "Dudes of Darkness"	Nominated	
2014	Canadian Screen Awards	Best Direction in an Animated Program or Series	Kevin Micallef for "Finding Finnwich"	Nominated	
2014	Canadian Screen Awards	Best Performance in an Animated Program or Series	Paul Soles for "Finding Finnwich"	Nominated	

== Broadcast ==
In Canada, the series was first shown during the week of September 12, 2011 on Teletoon with a preview of the first 5 episodes, and began airing regularly on January 5, 2012. On the French-language Télétoon, the show was aired as La Retenue.

The show first aired in Australia on ABC3 (now ABC Entertains) on May 12, 2012. The fourth-season finale premiered in Australia on January 31, 2014.

The series premiered on the "Always On" digital platform of Cartoon Network in the United States as part of the platform's 2014–2015 lineup. Some, but not all, episodes of the show were made available on Cartoon Network's website on September 29, 2014, spanning most of seasons 1 and 2.

In September 2019, the Nelvana-owned YouTube channel Retro Rerun began uploading episodes. The series has also aired in the United Kingdom on Kix.

The show currently airs reruns on Télétoon, Boomerang, and Disney XD in Canada.

=== International broadcasts ===
Country	Channel
United States	Cartoon Network (Note: "Always On" exclusive to provider on demand services and the Cartoon Network website/apps)
Norway	NRK Super
Brazil	Cartoon Network (Latin America)
Mexico	Cartoon Network (Latin America)
France	Télétoon+
France	Canal+ Family
Portugal	SIC K
Australia	ABC3
United Kingdom	Kix
Denmark	Cartoon Network (Scandinavia)

== Home video releases ==
Episodes have been made available in standard definition (seasons 2 and 3 also in high definition) on the Canadian iTunes Store as they aired on Teletoon, currently spanning seasons 1, 2, and 3.

All four seasons are available for purchase on Amazon Prime Video in the United States, both in high and standard definition.

The entire series has also been released on Ameba TV, Tubi TV, and on YouTube.
