= The Perishers =

British comic strip

- Author: Maurice Dodd
- Current status/schedule: Concluded / Reprinted
- Launch date: 19 October 1959
- End date: 10 June 2006
- Publisher: International Publishing Corporation
- Genre: Comedy

The Perishers is a long-running British comic strip about a group of neighbourhood children and a dog. It was printed in the Daily Mirror as a daily strip and first appeared on 19 October 1959. For most of its life it was written by Maurice Dodd (25 October 1922 – 31 December 2005), and was drawn by Dennis Collins until his retirement in 1983, after which it was drawn by Dodd and later by Bill Mevin. When Dodd died, the strip continued with several weeks' backlog of unpublished strips and some reprints until 10 June 2006. The strip then returned to the Daily Mirror, again as reprints, on 22 February 2010, replacing Pooch Café.

Many Perishers strips are polyptychs—a single continuous background image is divided into three or four panels and the characters move across it from panel to panel. The story is set in the fairly drab fictional town of Croynge (sometimes spelled Crunge), which is apparently a South London borough. The name is a portmanteau of Croydon and Penge. The location as depicted often resembles an industrial Northern town and may have its roots in how Croydon appeared in the 1950s. Collins's artwork in particular gives the town detailed, realistic architecture and a consistent geography.

The first strip from 19 October 1959.

Thematically, the strip draws upon nostalgia for childhood experiences and often has a static, almost limbo-like atmosphere, in a similar manner to its companion strip in the Daily Mirror, Andy Capp. The main characters largely exist independently of 'the real world' and adults are only rarely seen; for example, every year the Perishers go on holiday but always get thrown off the train home, forcing them to walk and arrive home several weeks late (a joke on how a short scene in comic book time can take several weeks when told in daily instalments), yet with seemingly no repercussions.

== Main characters ==
=== Wellington ===
An orphan boy who lives alone with his large dog, Boot. In the early days of the strip they lived in an approximately 10 ft (3.0 m) diameter concrete pipe section in a seemingly abandoned builder's yard. In 1966 he and Boot moved into a small railway station that had been closed by the Beeching Axe, and they have lived there ever since. Wellington takes his nickname from his trademark Wellington boots – he cannot afford proper shoes. He named his dog Boot to go with Wellington.

Wellington is a solemn intellectual and given to philosophical trains of thought. He can be resourceful – he supports himself by selling handmade wooden buggies (or "boobys" as Maisie calls them) and pilfering food from sympathetic local shops, or convoluted schemes to create sudden crowds in order to celebrate his birthday on 25 October (which also happened to be Maurice Dodd's birthday). Wellington is also a worrier, always concerned that the world is going to rack an' rooney (rack and ruin). Over the years, he has worried that the world is becoming clogged up with dirt, that people might get crushed by the weight of air above their heads, and that each new year might be the same old year recycled to save money. Wellington has noticed that he and his friends never get any older, although this is never followed to its logical conclusion. When he cheers up, a raincloud usually appears to dampen his spirits.

=== Boot ===
An Old English Sheepdog (sort of) who lives with his boy, Wellington. Boot is a generally affable and mellow character, given to flights of fancy and daydreaming. In this respect, Boot is the UK equivalent of Snoopy from Charles M. Schulz's Peanuts strip. Boot is also convinced that he is in fact an 18th-century English lord enchanted into a dog by a gypsy wench (as he puts it, I knew I should have bought those damn clothespegs!) – the strip gives occasional hints that this is actually true as opposed to another fantasy. As a lord, he demands to be treated with respect, and often tells Wellington so to his face. Unfortunately Wellington only hears barking. Wellington thinks Boot is lazy and should help out with the household chores, but Boot usually manages to find some way to "accidentally" mess things up in the hope that he won't be asked again. He hates taking baths, and his bathtime struggles with Wellington usually turn into epic battles (Once it cost 2 weeks of school for Wellington). Boot's favourite food appears to be links of sausages, and his attempts to consume these in advance of Wellington provide the basis of many episodes.

Boot was originally drawn with a short tail (on one occasion he met a bob-tailed sheepdog, and on hearing the name decided to call his own tail Fred), but Maurice Dodd later discovered that real Old English Sheepdogs' tails are docked, and so over the course of several years Collins drew his tail shorter and shorter until it vanished altogether – Boot still appears completely white, rare for the breed.

"Who is the Mother of Boot?" was a long-running mystery until a reader informed Wellington that Boot's dam was named "Cherry Blossom." ("Cherry Blossom" happens to be a well-known brand of shoe and boot polish). Additionally, Boot's sire is called T.O.E.cap, and was a Gun dog.

=== Marlon ===
Marlon is amiable but he is not very bright. This has not dampened his ambitions; he is enthusiastic and often tries his hand at inventing. The fact that most of his inventions – fire, the wheel, the horse and cart and so forth – had already been invented did not deter him, because he felt he was slowly catching up. He also claimed to have invented a "micro-stetho-deeposcope" – supposedly a high-tech instrument for probing deeply below the earth's surface, but which actually turned out to be a piece of broken mirror tied to a chair leg.

One of his culinary inventions did make a splash – literally: the inch-thick ketchup sandwich (subsequently renamed the 2.5 cm (0.98 in) thick ketchup sandwich when Marlon decided to go metric). The splash in question occurred whenever he bit into one, caused by a huge dollop of ketchup hitting whoever happened to be standing nearby. The ketchup sandwich is used as a recurring gag, occasionally replaced with other types of filling for variety.

Marlon also dreams of becoming either a brain surgeon (which is spelt brane surgeon in his speech balloons), or "a bloke wot goes down sewers in big rubber boots" – he considers either career to be equally prestigious. In the meantime he spends his pocket money on Wellington's buggies, which usually results in a battle between Wellington's persuasive skills and Maisie's desire for him to spend the money on her.

=== Maisie ===
(Maisie Grumpling). An adorable little girl – at least, according to her. In fact she is domineering and a bully, with a tendency to become violent if she doesn't get her own way, and a scream that can stun woodworm. She is scared of insects and spiders; on one occasion, when Wellington tells her that the field they are walking through may contain thousands of hidden insects, she is too terrified to move.

She believes she is in love with Marlon and continues to pursue him despite his resistance; their relationship has been described as a one-sided dynamic. She views their relationship through a romantic framework, while alternative descriptions characterize their traits differently.

Another character trait of hers is a fondness for paper bags (and the contents thereof). It is usually Wellington who has just managed to scrape together enough money for sweets or fish and chips, which he has then to hide lest a rustle attract Maisie, who will appear, as if from nowhere, to inquire: "Need any help with that paper bag?"

Maisie bears a resemblance to Lucy van Pelt in Charles Schulz's Peanuts strip. The British actress Maisie Williams was christened Margaret but has always been known as Maisie, after the character.

=== Baby Grumpling ===
The younger brother of Masie. A toddler, possibly named after the "Baby Dumpling" character in the US comic strip Blondie. In the early days of the strip he did not speak, because he knew that once he started he would be expected to keep talking all the time. When he finally began to speak he did so in entirely in lower-case letters.

In the early days of the strip he was not related to the other characters, but was later revealed to be Maisie's little brother (a retcon – in an earlier strip Maisie had referred to Baby Grumpling's parents as if they were not her own). He used to think that school was a prison from which the older Perishers were temporarily released each evening. He digs a lot of holes, which he always blames on worms (a significant part of his diet) or moles. He enjoys creating mischief with his space hopper, or by putting insects into Maisie's underwear drawer, when he isn't embarking on some improbable business venture or other (usually worm-related; he invented the wormburger, for instance, though nobody but Wellington ever bought one, and Wellington didn't initially believe it had real worms in it).

He often discusses philosophy with the new baby (an unseen character in a pram). He is also frequently seen questioning the plausibility of fairy tales or nursery rhymes read out by Maisie, while at the same time vandalising an alarm clock or other household item. His teddy bear Gladly (short for "Gladly, my cross-eyed bear") puts in occasional appearances.

== Recurring characters ==
Not all of these characters appeared during the same time periods

- The Crabs: The crustacean inhabitants of a seaside rock pool, visited by Boot every year during the Perishers' summer holiday. Some of the crabs believe that Boot's eyes peering down at them annually are a mystical visitation – "The Eyeballs in the Sky" – and this belief is exploited by a preacher crab who uses their appearance as an excuse to extort money from his congregation. His efforts are always opposed by a scientist crab who continually attempts to invent a device to break through the surface of the pool and investigate what the "Eyeballs" really are, despite the preacher's protests that he will "rend the fabric of the pooliverse". The conflict usually ends up in a full-scale crab fight, and Boot is left none the wiser as to crustacean behaviour. Usually, one of the crabs claims that something is "bad fer y'r 'ealth".
- Plain Jane: a cross-eyed friend of Maisie's, often seen selling potions and tonics from a home-made stall.
- Fiscal Yere:a boy who claims to be the son of a very rich father, and frequently eats chocolate cigars.
- Fred Beetle and the Caterpillar: a pair of insects often encountered by Boot. Fred is a socialist who seems to be modelled on Fred Kite from I'm All Right Jack. The Caterpillar's chain-smoking habit has stunted his growth and prevented his metamorphosis into a butterfly. This is just as well since he doesn't like heights. The Caterpillar, apparently, is a "meowist", and is depicted when it first appeared as meowing about. They are [[frenemies]], often best friends, but frequently they engage in fist fights against each other.
- Adolf Kilroy: a tortoise shaped like a World War 2 German helmet. He thinks he is the reincarnation of Adolf Hitler and speaks in Fraktur. He sometimes teams up with Fred Beetle and Caterpillar in an attempt to overthrow Boot, but the fact that Boot is much bigger always defeats them. This character last appeared in the summer of 1983 and it is said upon his 1984 take-over of the Daily Mirror that Robert Maxwell, a Czech whose family had been murdered by Nazi German troops during the war, objected to the Kilroy character appearing in the strip.
- B. H. (Calcutta) Failed: a kindly Indian bloodhound who lost his sense of smell in an unfortunate incident involving an elephant filled with curry which exploded in the noonday sun. B. H. literally bumped into Boot one day, and they have been good friends ever since, despite B. H.'s frequent attempts to steal Boot's meat bones. One of the strip's odder elements is B.H.'s claim to be a reporter for "The West Crunge Clarion and Dubious Advertiser", a low budget and downmarket local newspaper. He has a journalist's ear for an attention-grabbing headline, but his career may be held back by his inability to remember how to make the letter "b".
- Tatty Oldbitt (the Sailors' Friend): an over-amorous female Basset Hound who likes to chase sailors (and other dogs) – although just what she intends to do if she catches one is probably best left unexplored. She also chases Boot from time to time, but since he considers himself a lord she never gets very far with him, and often ends up going off with B. H. instead.
- Dirty McSquirty: the dirtiest boy in town, always accompanied by a cloud of flies. He resembles Pig-Pen in Charles Schultz's Peanuts strip.
- Cousin Worsoff: an unseen character. Dirty McSquirty's cousin, he is the proverbial "person who is worse off than you". He lives in the sewer, and Dirty speaks to him through drain covers.
- Poor girl: a girl who harasses Wellington with constant tales of poverty, despite wearing an impressive fur coat and claiming to have a household full of equally impoverished staff. She turns up shortly after Wellington's birthday, demanding that Wellington donate his presents to the poor, i.e. herself.
- Beryl Bogey: a large and physically intimidating dim-witted girl, or possibly gorilla, whose presence on Maisie's netball team gives them the ability to break down the opposition, literally. Her idol is King Kong.
- The cat: an unnamed cat recently adopted by Wellington, much to Boot's annoyance. The cat and Boot are engaged in a permanent battle of wits.
- The goldfish: another new pet of Wellington's. Contemplates philosophy while swimming around in his tiny bowl.
- The water-snail: the most recent arrival, bought by Wellington to clean the goldfish's bowl. The snail considers this a degrading job.
- The Ghengis St. Gang: An always-unseen rival gang of children. In general the Perishers argue about how to respond (run or fight) and are usually beaten up while trying to decide what to do.

== Catch phrases ==
This is a partial list of the phrases coined or made popular by the Perishers.

- "Go-faster stripes" – Wellington's big selling-point on the buggies he tries to persuade Marlon to buy. It has become a way of describing any useless or frivolous addition to a product.
- "GRONFF!!" – The sound of Boot gobbling up something tasty, often something meant for another character, once the contents of a bird table. Also used sometimes when other characters eat.
- " Parasite! Trotskyite! Marmite!" – Insults hurled at each other by the Beetle and the Caterpillar whenever they brawl, which is frequently. Marmite is, of course, not exactly a valid insult, but does end in "-ite".
- "Vilson Kepple und Betty!" – Kilroy the Tortoise's favourite exclamation. It derives from the music hall stage act Wilson, Keppel and Betty.
- "Need any help with that paper bag?" – Maisie can detect the opening of a bag of crisps from far away, appearing almost instantly to help with the consumption of the contents, uttering this phrase as soon as she arrives.
- "Yeuk!!" – Marlon's reaction to Maisie's perennial romantic advances. He responds to her in this way so often that Maisie has actually asked Marlon, "Is 'yeuk' the only word you know?"
- "Ratbag" – The kids' favourite insult. Absent from the very early days of the strip, it quickly became a staple. Maisie is particularly fond of the word, and constantly uses it to refer to Marlon.
- "Berk" – New Baby's final response to anything said to it by Baby Grumpling. Might be construed as calling him a berk, but is intended as baby noise.

== Final strip and editorial comment ==
A final, specially drawn strip appeared on the Daily Mirror's comic page on Saturday 10 June 2006. The strip depicts the silhouetted figures of Maisie, Baby Grumpling, Wellington, Boot and Marlon walking down a street into the sunset. Wellington says, "Well, dear readers, it's taken almost fifty years for you to see the back of us. In sayin' goodbye we hope that you remember us with the affecshun we feel for you." The tone of the strip is reminiscent of Charles M. Schulz's final Peanuts strip, from which the Perishers strip took its inspiration.

The strip was initially replaced by the short-lived Ronaldinho, during the then-ongoing World Cup. After the tournament, the Canadian Pooch Café appeared as a more permanent replacement.

== Annuals ==
Regular collections of the strip were published in book form. The first Perishers book was issued in the UK in 1963, often referred to as 'Meet the Perishers' but was in fact just titled 'The Perishers'. The second issue, 'The Perishers Strike Again', was published two years later in 1965. Further issues were then mostly published at the rate of two per year, commencing in 1968 (exceptions being three issued in 1972, and one in 1974, 1975, 1976 and 1977). A total of 27 annuals were released, the last being published in 1981.

In 1974, in addition to the regular book, an omnibus collection of previously published strips was issued, followed by two further omnibus collections in 1975 and 1976.

== Reprints ==
After a gap of nearly four years, the original cartoon strip returned to the Daily Mirror as reprints, on 22 February 2010 due to popular demand.

== Animation ==
In 1979, 20 five-minute animated shorts featuring the strip's characters were made by Bill Melendez Productions (coincidentally, the same studio behind the Peanuts animated specials) for the BBC.

== LP record ==
Around 1980 an LP record album entitled THE PERISHERS SING! (WELL SORT OF) was issued by Response Records, with lyrics written by Maurice Dodd and music by Trevor Evan Jones. An instrumental version of the final track "It's Great to be a Kid" was also the theme music for the animated TV version. Dodd's official website claims 12 songs were penned, but the finished album only contained 10 tracks. It featured narration by Bernard Cribbins, and also credits Nicky James and Barbara Sexton with vocals.

=== Track list ===
Side 1:

1. Ole Boot and Me (Wellington)
2. Battle of Vindaloo (B.H. Calcutta)*
3. Pervided I Get My Way (Maisie)
4. Eyeballs in the Sky (the Crabs)*
5. Dreaming (Wellington)

Side 2:

1. Boot (Boot)*
2. At Least We've Got Each Other (Wellington)
3. Speed Demon (Marlon)
4. Für Adolf (Adolf Kilroy)
5. It's Great to be a Kid (all the kids)
- Lyrics for the three (*) noted songs can be found on Dodd's official website under "The Battle of Vindaloo", "A Crabby Lament" and "The song of Boot".

== Compilations, annuals, and books ==
- Collins, Dennis (1965), "The Perishers strike again", Daily Mirror
- Collins, Dennis; Dodd, Maurice (1970), The Perishers : being the eighth book of their cartoon adventures, I.P.C. Newspapers, ISBN 978-0-600-36961-5
- Collins, Dennis; Dodd, Maurice (1971), The Perishers, Daily Mirror Books, ISBN 978-0-600-36980-6
- Collins, Dennis; Dodd, Maurice (1972), The Perishers, Daily Mirror Books, ISBN 978-0-600-37009-3
- Collins, Dennis; Dodd, Maurice (1974), The Perishers omnibus, 'Daily Mirror' Books, ISBN 978-0-85939-031-6
- Collins, Dennis; Dodd, Maurice (1975), The Perishers omnibus / No.2, Mirror Group Books, ISBN 978-0-85939-046-0
- Collins, Dennis; Dodd, Maurice (1976), The Perishers omnibus, Mirror Group Books, ISBN 978-0-85939-067-5
- Dodd, Maurice; Collins, Dennis (1979), The Perishers spectacolour, Mirror Books, ISBN 978-0-85939-169-6
- Dodd, Maurice; Collins, Dennis, 1951- (1980), The Perishers book, Mirror, ISBN 978-0-85939-235-8
- Dodd, Maurice; Collins, Dennis (1983), The Perishers omnibus, Mirror Books, ISBN 978-0-85939-389-8
- Dodd, Maurice; Collins, Dennis, 1951- (1981), The tale of a tail _ or The life and times of Boot the dog, Mirror, ISBN 978-0-85939-240-2
