= Maurice Dodd =

English cartoonist

- Born: 25 October 1922 Hackney, England
- Died: 31 December 2005 (aged 83)
- Areas: Cartoonist, Writer
- Notable works: The Perishers

Maurice Dodd (25 October 1922 – 31 December 2005) was an English writer and cartoonist best known for his years spent working on The Perishers comic strip published in the Daily Mirror.

== Biography ==
Dodd was born in Hackney. During the Second World War he served in the Royal Air Force as a Servicing Commando, alongside Bill Herbert. After the war Dodd was demobilised and began to study art. He then found work in advertising and, after he won a competition to write a slogan for Time, Bill Herbert, by then the cartoon editor at The Daily Mirror, offered Dodd the chance to take over the writing of a comic strip he had created, The Perishers. Working with the artist Dennis Collins, Dodd provided rough layouts, which Collins then drew from.

Dodd continued to work in advertising, such as on the Clunk Click Every Trip series of public information films intended to remind drivers of the benefits of wearing a seatbelt. It was while he was working on this campaign that Dodd came into contact with FilmFair, a company responsible for the creation of television programmes based on The Wombles and Paddington Bear. Dodd collaborated with the company in bringing The Perishers to television. Dodd left advertising in 1980 and subsequently wrote a number of children's books.

In 1983 Collins retired, leaving Dodd to write and draw The Perishers alone until 1992, when Bill Mevin began doing all the art work for the strip. Dodd continued working on the strip until he died, from a brain haemorrhage, in Shepperton on 31 December 2005.
