= Rosa Tran =

American film producer

Rosa Tran is an American film producer who specializes in stop-motion animation. In 2016, she was nominated for the Academy Award for Best Animated Feature in the 88th Academy Awards for producing the film Anomalisa.

== Filmography ==
=== Film ===
- 2015: Anomalisa
- 2020: I'm Thinking of Ending Things (producer of animation)

=== Television ===
- 2018–2021: Final Space (supervising producer - 10 episodes, 2018) (co-executive producer - 26 episodes, 2019–2021)
- 2012: Beforel Orel: Trust (producer - Television special)
- 2010–2011: Mad (production manager - 20 episodes)
- 2010–2012: Mary Shelley's Frankenhole (production supervisor - 1 episode, 2010) (associate producer - 2 episodes, 2010) (producer - 10 episodes, 2012)
- 2009: Titan Maximum (production supervisor - 9 episodes)
- 2008: Moral Orel (production coordinator - 13 episodes)
- 2006–2008: Robot Chicken (production supervisor - 20 episodes, 2008–2009) (head of puppet fabrication - 19 episodes, 2007–2008) (puppet coordinator - 1 episode, 2006)
