= List of Moral Orel episodes =

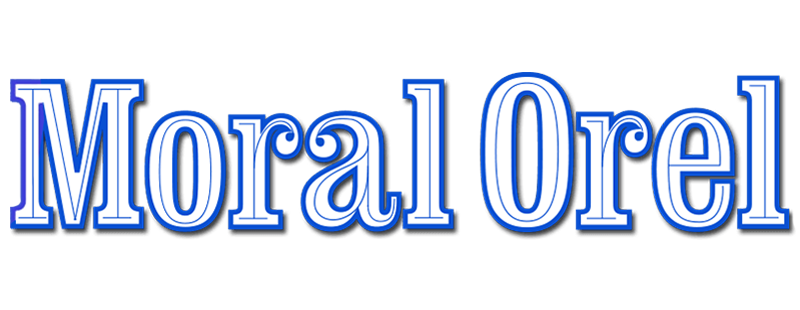

Moral Orel is an American stop-motion animated television series for adults created by Dino Stamatopoulos which originally aired on Cartoon Network's nighttime programming block Adult Swim from December 13, 2005, to December 18, 2008. The series follows the titular Orel Puppington, a young happy-go-lucky and naïve Protestant who showcases his commitment to God, while dealing with the cynicism of his abusive and alcoholic father, his lethargic mother, and the devoutly Protestant town of Moralton in which he resides.

== Series overview ==
Season	Episodes	Originally released	
Season	Episodes	First released	Last released
1	10	December 13, 2005	July 31, 2006
2	20	November 13, 2006	July 16, 2007
3	13	October 9, 2008	December 18, 2008
Special		November 19, 2012	

== Episodes ==
=== Season 1 (2005–06) ===
Three episodes in this season had to be cleared by Cartoon Network's Standards and Practices office before they could be aired: "God's Chef" (strong sexual themes), "Loyalty" (depictions of homosexuals and violence against them), and "Maturity" (alcohol consumption by a minor). As a result, they were delayed by several months and premiered out of production order.

No. overall	No. in season	Title	Directed by	Written by	Original release date	Prod. code
1	1	"The Lord's Greatest Gift"	Dino Stamatopoulos	Dino Stamatopoulos	January 22, 2006	101
Orel believes that everyone buried in the cemetery is being disrespectful to God by rejecting His greatest gift, life. He decides to bring his best friend Doughy's dead grandfather back to life using the Necronomicon he stole from the library; naively believing the corpse's unchanged clothes are causing it to stink, he strips it naked. Doughy's grandfather comes to life as a zombie and kills a nearby police officer, whom Orel also brings back to life after stripping him of his bloody uniform. Within minutes, Moralton is being terrorized by naked, flesh-eating zombies. Orel's father confronts him and explains that everyone is afraid of the zombies' nudity, which is prohibited by the "Lost" 11th Commandment: "Thou shalt be ashamed of thy natural anatomy." Orel and his family proceed to clothe the zombies, who continue to terrorize the town, though everyone is laughing.
2	2	"God's Chef"	Scott Adsit	Dino Stamatopoulos	July 31, 2006	102
In an unseen event, Orel discovered masturbation a week ago and enjoys it. He sneaks off to the bathroom at school and Clicky the janitor catches him at it. Principal Fakey and Reverend Putty tell him that masturbation is worse than murder and that he'll go to Hell for it. Putty explains that every sperm must be used to make babies. Wanting to keep masturbating without going to Hell, Orel asks Clay where babies come from. Clay uses a book of age-appropriate conception tales to explain that "God's chef" comes down to sleeping women each night fills them with his "delicious glaze from his holy pastry bag." Orel promptly borrows his mother's pastry bag and starts breaking into houses each night, filling the bag with his sperm, and impregnating the sleeping women, taking on the role as "God's chef". After a month, an entire block experiences a wave of pregnancies, raising alarm in the community as some couples hadn't consummated yet. Orel is caught in the act that night, and the police are taking him away when Clay arrives to take him to the study, where he first scolds him for being out past curfew. After Orel admits that he did it because he wanted to spread his seed, Clay explains that "God's chef" is more of mythical figure like Santa Claus or Charles Darwin. In an odd turn of events, Clay admits that keeping Orel ignorant about sex was wrong and incorrect behavior. Then he tells Orel that the only way to make babies is the missionary position, cites the lost 12th Commandment, and admonishes Orel for using the pastry bag as a fun and unusual implement. Orel asks if he should spank Clay after he admitted he was wrong, and they share a laugh before Clay quickly refuses.
3	3	"Charity"	Dino Stamatopoulos	Dino Stamatopoulos	February 6, 2006	103
As he starts a part-time job at the drugstore, Orel learns that good Christians should help the poor. He gives a homeless man, who turns out to be a drug dealer, money he made at his job in exchange for crack. Knowing that good Christians never waste anything, Orel is obliged to smoke it and becomes hooked to the extent that he starts injecting it. Soon he quits his job to make more money by donating blood. Eventually the dealer is arrested and Orel's father confronts him and explains that he wasn't helping a poor man; being a drug dealer, the man was actually rich and "lucky." Clay then chastises Orel not for smoking or shooting up, but for using slang: according to the "Lost" 13th commandment, "Thou shalt not bastardize the American language." Clay confiscates the crack to donate it to charity for double the money.
4	4	"Waste"	Scott Adsit	Dino Stamatopoulos	January 30, 2006	104
Orel starts drinking his own urine to avoid wasting it, which is prohibited by the "Lost" 14th Commandment: "Thou shalt always clean thy plate and not waste anything, whether thy stomach is full or not." He takes his urine to school and starts improving in track due to its richness in vitamins. His gym teacher, Coach Stopframe, tells the rest of his students to start taking Orel's mysterious new "energy drink". When the students turn to Orel for some, he decides to sell it, and the track team gets into the state championship. When Clay learns this, he forces Orel to tell the whole school the truth. After Orel apologizes, he is chastised not for letting people drink his urine, but for charging them for what cost him nothing to make.
5	5	"The Blessed Union"	Dino Stamatopoulos	Dino Stamatopoulos	February 20, 2006	105
Orel learns that men should do everything they can to keep their wives happy so God finds listening to their prayers easier. He goes around town asking people how to do that. His teacher is unwilling to answer questions after class, and the librarian decides to protest outside Reverend Putty's church because he's putting these ideas into children's heads. Next he asks his parents; his mother is too busy cleaning, and his father tells him to read magazines written by men who think they know what women want. Orel goes to the drugstore and starts reading magazines; when the owner sees him, he recommends an adult magazine that leads Orel to a sex shop. He asks the owner Stephanie, who's wearing all-black and has many piercings, for a piercing that will increase the pleasure of intercourse, and she gives him a Prince Albert piercing. After the procedure, Orel develops a crush on her, since she's nicer than everyone else in town. At the school gym, Coach Stopframe notices Orel's piercing. He calls Clay, who has written his number on a napkin with the phrase "Call me" emphasized. Back at the sex shop, Orel tries to find ways to spend time with Stephanie. She lets him down softly, telling him to go outside or he'll never grow. After he leaves, she gets "maternal pangs," so she gives herself a piercing to get rid of them. As Orel leaves, Clay arrives and drags him back to the study, where he explains that Stephanie was nice because she's different; when you're not different, you're allowed to be mean sometimes. He then explains that women don't need men to get piercings because they're too smart: they've learned that cooking, cleaning, and childbearing will keep them happy. During all this, Bloberta is cleaning a bearskin rug near Clay with dandruff shampoo.
6	6	"Omnipresence"	Scott Adsit	Dino Stamatopoulos	February 13, 2006	106
Orel learns that God is in everything and everyone. The next day at school, he argues with his teacher Ms. Sculptham about a bad grade, because he believes he can't be wrong with God in him. Thinking that everything, including himself, should be treated divinely, he excuses himself from school and travels across town, eventually getting to a lake. Before he can try to walk on water, he sees a man trying to commit suicide and calls 911; the police arrive and arrest the man, since suicide is a crime. Having saved someone, he heads to the hospital to repeat his actions. Nurse Bendy humors him and lets him visit sick people. He first finds a man in a wheelchair who turns out to be a doctor who's taking a rest in the chair, but Orel thinks he's saved the man and moves on to an old lady on life support. He can't heal her, so she asks him to take away her pain by pulling the plug. Nurse Bendy catches him doing so and calls Clay, who explains that while God's in everything, there's not enough of him in those things to make a difference, and Orel can't act as judge and jury, only as judge.
7	7	"God-Fearing"	Dino Stamatopoulos	Dino Stamatopoulos	February 27, 2006	107
At Halloween, a police officer visits school and tells the children that the only "safe" costumes are those that promote God. The children go to a church-hosted haunted house that night. As they go through it, Orel isn't scared once. He tells his friends it's because he has God and Jesus on his side so has no reason to fear anyone or anything. In church the next day, he learns that if you sin, all you need to do is repent and God will forgive you. Orel decides he can make God angry with him (and be able to get scared) if he breaks all the Ten Commandments and repents the next day. He breaks every commandment in order (his own, not the actual order), but has trouble with "Thou shalt not kill," which he inadvertently breaks when he tries to help an old man across the street; a car hits and kills the man. Clay sets up a meeting with Reverend Putty for Orel; if he'd known beforehand that Orel planned to repent, he wouldn't have given him the usual belting. Putty tells Orel that no matter what day of the year it is, God is the only thing anyone should ever fear: God is the one who creates hurricanes, diseases, and foreign cultures. After Orel heads home to dinner, the credits roll over the lonely Reverend silently eating his own dinner while the windows behind him get pelted with eggs.
8	8	"Loyalty"	Jay Johnston	Dino Stamatopoulos	May 22, 2006	108
As the family arrives at church one morning, Orel runs into Coach Stopframe, who introduces him to his nephew Joe and asks Orel to be Joe's "Bible buddy," as he isn't quite settled into the Christianity scene yet. Orel accepts and the boys sit together during a sermon that mentions that an important aspect of friendship is undying loyalty. But Joe is a violent sociopath. Orel is skeptical about this behavior, but remembering what he learned about loyalty in friendship, he reluctantly joins in on Joe's "fun" instead of spending time with his own friends, who go to Clay with their concern about Orel's dangerous interest in Joe. While Clay indulges them (over a few glasses of liquor), Joe leads Orel into the woods to beat up some homosexuals (specifically two small boys taking turns kissing each other's cheeks with innocent glee). Clay drives up, running over trees along the way, and orders Orel into the car. They talk in Clay's study while the boy Orel was beating knocks out Joe and resumes kissing his friend. Clay scolds Orel not for doing something he knew was wrong but for neglecting all his other friends in favor of one single friend; he says Orel should have invited all his friends to come along with him and Joe and join in with whatever was going on. After all, Lost Commandment 18 says "Thou shalt be loyal to all thy friends at the same time."
9	9	"Maturity"	Dino Stamatopoulos	Dino Stamatopoulos	May 29, 2006	109
Orel and his little brother Shapey are outside, and Shapey is aiming around haphazardly with his BB gun. Orel scolds Shapey for being careless and Shapey starts a tantrum. Their mother, busy in the kitchen, tells Orel to play nicely with Shapey or the neighbors will think she's a bad parent. While Orel tries to explain the situation, Shapey sticks the barrel in Orel's eye and pulls the trigger. Orel's father admonishes him for the accident and tells him to be more responsible and mature. To learn more about adults, Orel visits the local pub and sees Moralton's adults drowning their sorrows. Orel gleans that the key to being an adult is to drink the special "maturity juice," and at home he goes to his father's study and helps himself to Dad's liquor; he gets so drunk that he sees himself as middle-aged, then old. When Clay sees him, he tells him that he can't simply drink alcohol to be more mature. First, he must experience stress over things he can't control, as well as an unfulfilling job, among other things. As he endures these hardships and learns to accept them as normal, he earns the right to drink regularly.
10	10	"The Best Christmas Ever"	Scott Adsit; Jay Johnston; Dino Stamatopoulos	Dino Stamatopoulos	December 13, 2005	110
On Christmas Eve, Orel learns of the Second Coming of Jesus, and that he may already be on this Earth, though not as nice as before. When he overhears his parents discussing his horribly-spoiled little brother Shapey's unplanned birth, Orel believes Shapey to be the reborn Jesus. (He's actually the result of Bloberta's extramarital affair.) Bloberta announces that she wants to divorce Clay. On Christmas morning, Orel does everything he can to make Shapey happy and ends up joining him in destroying a manger scene. This is called to his mother's attention, and she tells him about the divorce. That night, Orel sees his father drowning his sorrows at the local pub. Orel remarks that this may not have been the best Christmas ever, but there are two minutes left and he has complete faith that God will fix everything. He piously stares up at the heavens waiting for divine intervention which, it is implied, never comes.

=== Season 2 (2006–07) ===
No. overall	No. in season	Title	Directed by	Written by	Original release date	Prod. code
11	1	"God's Image"	Chris McKay	Dino Stamatopoulos; Nick Weidenfeld; Scott Adsit	November 13, 2006	201
Orel's parents reluctantly reunite after their proposed divorce in "The Best Christmas Ever", not because they've resolved anything, Clay explains, but to "keep up appearances" before the neighbors. Meanwhile, little Billy Figurelli gets hurt and Orel notices that the bandage ("the color of God's skin") he puts on the boy doesn't blend in with his skin like it does with Orel's skin or that of other boys he knows. Orel prompts Moralton to segregate God's people from the Figurellis, the only non-WASP, Italian-American family in town. But this leads to a form of reverse racism as the family is sent to live in a large mansion outside of town to become free from the repressive theocracy that controls the city of Moralton. The men of Moralton become jealous that the Figurellis have a better house than any of theirs and that their children, seeing how well the Figurellis live, are adopting their mannerisms and becoming "Wigurellis." Feeling that their society is being torn apart, the citizens of Moralton have the Figurellis' house burned down. But when the fire spreads to all the other buildings in Moralton but the church and the Figurellis' dream house, everyone sees Orel as the root of the whole problem and every man and woman in town takes a turn at belting him. They then teach him that his actions made it inconvenient for the racists and not the "racers," thus removing the need of discrimination.
12	2	"Love"	Scott Adsit	Dino Stamatopoulos	November 20, 2006	218
At the park with his family, Orel finds a stray dog who takes a liking to him. When his parents let him keep the dog, Orel names him Bartholomew, the two become inseparable, and the dog becomes popular around town. Later, Reverend Putty preaches that God wants the faithful to "love Jesus more than anything else in the world". Orel takes this message to heart but realizes that he loves his dog more than Jesus so is unsure what to do. He goes to his father who tells him that love is only temporary, and Orel tries to distract himself. His friend Doughy, whom he told of his problem earlier, arrives with a group of adults who hate the dog for the love and attention he gets from the children. They convince Orel to give up Bartholomew, who is led away to be euthanized. After feeling sad, Orel perks up realizing that they'll see each other in Heaven, until Bloberta informs him that animals have no souls so can't go to Heaven or Hell and are meant to be eaten. She's boiling a lobster who shrieks in agony, attracting Clay: "Something sounds delicious!"
13	3	"Satan"	Chris McKay; Dino Stamatopoulos	Dino Stamatopoulos	November 27, 2006	204
This episode focuses on Coach Stopframe, a disloyal opportunist who offers himself to both God and Satan. Seeking help from Satan to win the heart of Orel's dad, Stopframe contacts a secret group of Satanists who will help him craft a love spell if he brings a virgin to their next meeting. He chooses Orel, but when he gets to the meeting, he is shocked that the Satan-worshippers aren't Satan's murderous disciples; they're just a group of nerdy, overweight hedonists who get together to gorge themselves on junk food and have orgies. Stopframe and Orel leave the party and Stopframe resumes his ambiguous relationship with Orel's dad.
14	4	"Elemental Orel"	Chris McKay	Dino Stamatopoulos	December 4, 2006	207
Orel solves problems using logic. After the church-collection money is stolen, Orel sets out to find the thief and blames a young girl while falling for the over-the-top lies the real culprit (the school bully) spins to trick him. In the process, Orel discovers his parents engaging in sex games, regarding his mother cleaning another man's house as a form of "wife-swapping" his father has forced her to do with a friend, in order to gain sexual pleasure from watching her clean a stranger's home.
15	5	"Offensiveness"	Chris McKay	Dino Stamatopoulos	December 11, 2006	210
Orel witnesses Mr. Figurelli giving Ms. Censordoll free underfried eggs (eggs are her "only source of pleasure") to keep her from protesting his corner market, and decides to join her crusades against movies, books, and nearly everything else. Eventually he realizes that eggs are from a "naughty place between chickens' legs" and starts protesting them being served at Figurelli's market. This angers Censordoll, but she can't tell Orel to stop the protest without losing her credibility as a prudish protester. Censordoll reluctantly joins in the protest against her beloved eggs, causing a townwide ban on all eggs but "sin-free" Cesarean-born eggs. The episode closes with her sneaking off to an illegal egg black market set up by a deranged farmer who is sexually-obsessed with the way that his hens lay eggs.
16	6	"God's Blunders"	Chris McKay; Dino Stamatopoulos	Dino Stamatopoulos	December 18, 2006	206
For questioning the school's policy of forcing students to believe that God, and certainly not science is responsible for everything in the world, a classmate of Orel's is declared mentally-retarded by the school and forced into a "Special Education" class where all the kids who defy the town's theocracy and want to learn the truth are exile. Orel wonders why God would let people be retarded, and his father declares mental retardation "God's blunders" and that people don't understand "God's blunders" because these "mistakes" are part of God's master plan that humans "can't understand." Orel's friend becomes the defender of the other intellectual students, protecting them from Orel's other friends, who throw rocks and taunt the "retarded" students. Orel comes to his friend's defense and convinces the school to pity, not hate, "the retarded."
17	7	"Pleasure"	Chris McKay	Mark Rivers	January 8, 2007	202
Orel takes Reverend Putty's puritanical sermon against earthly pleasures to heart and eliminates everything he enjoys from his life--all of his good deeds. After a good-deed-free day, he has a wet dream in which God congratulates him on being good, and he wakes up to find he has had a wet dream. Seeking Putty's advice, the Reverend tells Orel to inflict pain on himself to stop whatever "impure thoughts" gave him his pleasure, which Orel realizes is worshiping God. He begins physically abusing himself with crushed glass, barbed wire, and rocks each time he thinks about God, which is frequently. He meets a fellow self-abuser (actually a masochist) who shows Orel the "Glory Hallelujah Hole", a Christianity-themed Sadism & Masochism club, which he joins to enjoy pain. That night he has another wet dream in which God spanks him for being "bad", so he consults his father. Clay is angry, but realizes that he can't use his belt on Orel as usual because Orel would enjoy it. He explains to Orel that unless he learns to fear pain again, he can't learn any lessons.
18	8	"The Lord's Prayer"	Scott Adsit	Scott Adsit	January 15, 2007	211
A new family, the Posabules, moves in next door. Everyone gets along at first, and Orel is smitten with Christina, who's about his age. But the families differ in how they interpret the Lord's Prayer: the Puppingtons advocate forgiving trespassing, and the Posabules advocate forgiving debt. The adults become bitterly estranged and Orel is forbidden to see Christina; they meet secretly, but he runs away from her, fearing the consequences of going against tradition. He runs to Reverend Putty, who tells him he'll go to Hell if he goes against the Lord's Prayer. The Posabules end up moving away, taking Shapey instead of their own young son, but nobody realizes the error.
19	9	"Holy Visage"	Chris McKay	David Agosto; Jay Johnston	January 22, 2007	203
On a class field trip, Orel befriends a Jewish doctor, Dr. Chosenberg. He also places a spiky wooden Jesus bobblehead in front of Mr. Figurelli while he's driving the bus. Figurelli barely avoids an accident, and in the process Dr. Chosenberg is badly injured when the bobblehead embeds itself in his side. When he recovers, he's horrified to learn that nobody will treat his injury or his terrible pain because the wound looks like Jesus so they consider it a miracle. He pleads for reason and sanity, but the doctor just makes Nurse Bendy sedate him. He becomes even more horrified when patients with contagious and fatal diseases kiss, breathe, and cough into the wound thinking it will heal them, and everyone in town lines up to see this. When he tries to suture the wound himself, his arms are restrained. In two days, his condition worsens and he desperately turns to Orel for help. Orel is conflicted: he wants to help, but is afraid it's a sign of losing faith. His father just tells him to "lie to himself." Finally Orel puts the Jesus bobblehead on a medicine cart and pushes it next to Dr. Chosenberg; with the medicines in reach, Chosenberg manages to concoct an antidote and uses his Star of David to apply it to the wound. The next morning, the wound has healed. When Orel calls the bobblehead a miracle, Clay says it was deliberately made to look like Jesus so can't be considered a miracle; only accidents can be. Immediately, Clay discovers that the medicine bottles are arranged to look like Jesus; calling that a miracle he grabs the foot powder to treat his foot ailment, while Orel correctly guesses that Dr. Chosenberg did that himself.
20	10	"Be Fruitful and Multiply"	Chris McKay	Dino Stamatopoulos	January 29, 2007	213
Orel runs into Reverend Putty at Mr. Figurelli's store while buying his father a new belt. Annoyed, Putty shooes Orel away and happily purchases a new heart-shaped wastebasket to replace one that was stolen years ago. Orel then goes to the sex shop where Stephanie works and invites her to church. To his surprise she agrees to go, then examines a picture of Putty privately. The scene shifts to Putty's bedroom, where he angrily, desperately pleads that God sends him a woman, then masturbates to unconsciousness. The next day, Stephanie attends church. Reverend Putty is delighted, and after a less-than-subtle sermon on procreation, he happily makes a lunch date with her. The joy dims when Stephanie reveals that she's his daughter; her mother had stalked Reverend Putty for weeks and stolen a sperm sample from his wastebasket. After wallowing in sorrow for a while, Putty consults Orel and Orel tells him about what brings him joy, and Putty comes around and he and Stephanie begin a new relationship as father and daughter.
21	11	"Praying"	Ross Shuman	Dino Stamatopoulos	April 30, 2007	208
Orel enters a praying competition against the Begging Mantises, an extremely powerful team with a 50-to-0 win–loss record. He's forced to practice praying every day, but halfway through training sessions, he's unable to pray and forcing himself brings on incredible pain. Desperate, he attempts to pray at a local park, and an ad for Stephanie's shop, Buried Pleasures, blows into his face. Convinced that this is God's answer, the obviously-stressed Orel goes to Stephanie and she gives him a pack of incense and a vinyl disc of Buddhist chants and tells him to use them to relax. Meanwhile, Clay comes home and Bloberta gives him a message from Principal Fakey: apparently, everyone's betting on Orel to win. Clay finds Orel meditating and admonishes him for using Buddhism, calling it a "Communist cult" that allows any religion under the sun, then explains the concept of dogma as restrictions on religion. The big day arrives and the Begging Mantises are extremely tough: one competitor walks off the stage with profusely-bleeding hands. The competition begins and Orel and the leader of the Begging Mantises start praying with major effort. Dogma literally stresses Orel as the heads of Clay, Fakey, Putty, and Nurse Bendy, all on dog bodies, verbally attack him. Orel throws an imaginary bone at the dogs; while watching them run toward it, he's transported into his own Nirvana where he converses with the Buddha. Orel accepts that he can use Buddhist techniques to become a good Christian, and the Buddha's face slowly transforms into Orel's face as Orel becomes "awake". The Buddha tells Orel to not tell anyone else in Moralton, then is absorbed into Orel as the viewers are returned to the real world, where Orel is calm, but Clay looks furious. The Begging Mantis member is horribly stressed out and he collapses, and Orel is declared the winner. Clay's anger vanishes and he joins the crowd that gathers to congratulate Orel. The scene ends with Orel still in meditative pose, slightly levitating from the ground, as he slowly uncrosses his legs, sets himself back on Earth, and joins his friends.
22	12	"Repression"	Chris McKay	Scott Adsit & Dino Stamatopoulos	May 7, 2007	205
Principal Fakey's affair with Nurse Bendy brings him horrible guilt that becomes harder and harder to bear, and he keeps confiding his problems and concerns about his affair to a less-than-receptive Reverend Putty, who lives on Fakey's embellished details. When Fakey begs for guidance, Putty abandons him in disgust, leaving Orel to help. Orel's father has just advised him that authority figures are above the law and thus not responsible, so Orel tells Fakey this, concluding that if a man in Fakey's position is sin-free, then he's not actually guilty of anything. Fakey confidently continues his affair with Nurse Bendy until he receives shattering news: he has gonorrhea. Although he clearly got it from Nurse Bendy, Orel's guidance leads him to assume that it came from his wife, and he throws her out of their home and ends their marriage. Witnessing and feeling responsible for the dissolution of the Fakeys' marriage, Orel goes to Putty, who abandons him on learning that "Mrs. Fakey is a free agent," telling him to use the same advice he gave to Fakey. Orel does and skips off happily.
23	13	"Turn the Other Cheek"	Chris McKay	Scott Adsit	May 14, 2007	214
Orel listens to a Christian-themed children's record that extols the virtues of turning the other cheek even in the face of a beating; when the school bully Walt beats him up, Orel doesn't defend himself. Believing he's showing strength by being weak, Orel lets Walt beat him up every day until Bloberta complains to Clay about the blood on Orel's clothes and worries about doubling her detergent budget. Clay finds Orel in the yard and tells him that God actually wants him to defend himself and recommends that Orel show Walt "how to turn the other cheek." Seeing this as a way to teach the Bible, Orel knocks Walt out after he confronts Doughy and makes a fist. Orel is praised at first, but praise turns to fear when Orel starts automatically pummeling anyone who forms a fist, including Doughy after he throws "rock" in rock, paper, scissors. Finally, Orel savagely beats his own parents. In the study later, Clay tells Orel that he won't punish him because he was following his father's advice, and any punishment would be "admitting wrongness."
24	14	"Geniusis"	Ethan A. Marak	Mathew Harawitz	May 21, 2007	215
While on a Pious Scouts trip in an artificial forest, Orel and Doughy are told about the "evils" of Darwinism when they stumble across a hominid frozen in a block of ice. After thawing it, Orel considers the Missing Link to be his new friend, but after he runs amok at the church bake sale, the town forcibly educates the caveman on Christian dogma and Moralton thinking in general. After re-education and a complete grooming overhaul, the Missing Link becomes "Link McMissuns," a popular right-wing talk-radio host. But his star quickly falls when he's faced with his own background during a debate with a scientist on the Theory of Evolution. The citizens of Moralton riot, capture Link, and lock him the church freezer; then they head out to Forghetty's. Forgotten, Link refreezes and is left undiscovered for 1 million more years until Zorel, a boy identical in appearance to Orel, retrieves pastries for a bake sale. The camera zooms out to reveal that Moralton has grown to encompass the whole United States, which is now the only continent on Planet Earth.
25	15	"Courtship"	Chris McKay	Scott Aukerman; Neil Campbell; Paul Rust	June 4, 2007	217
While staying over at Doughy's. Orel unwittingly leads him to realize that his parents are neglecting him; they never even call him "son." Doughy quickly perks up thanks to denial and free ice cream from Mr. Creepler (though Doughy spurns Creepler's invitation to explore his van). The next day, Ms. Sculptham returns papers and compliments Doughy's "C−", calling him "son," though in a condescending fashion. Happy with the praise, Doughy quickly forms an attachment to Ms. Sculptham that develops into a massive crush. Using money saved up from years of half-hearted parenting from his father, Doughy gives Ms. Sculptham a necklace and he instantly becomes her favorite pupil, though her favor does not extend beyond surrounding Doughy's "F" with a heart. But when Doughy runs out of money, Ms. Sculptham promptly scorns him. Desperate for help he goes to Orel, who suggests that Doughy manipulate Mr. Creepler into giving him expensive gifts that he can pass on to Ms. Sculptham. Unsure if this is an acceptable practice, Orel asks his mother, who tells him that women should receive everything from their husbands and denies that the Bible states that "[I]t is better to give than to receive." With Mr. Creepler lavishing gifts on him, Doughy quickly regains Ms. Sculptham's favor, even taking her to Paris. But when he realizes that she'll never return his love, Doughy decides to do what he feels he should have done from the beginning: get into the back of Mr. Creepler's van. But he soon flees in disgust and decides to give up romance forever. The episode ends with Doughy sitting alone on his stoop while his parents make out in the living room.
26	16	"School Pageant"	Jeff Gardner	Dino Stamatopoulos	June 11, 2007	209
Six months after the breakup of the folk-trio The Crucifolk, the long-forgotten bassist, Mr. Armiture, resurfaces at Diorama Elementary with his universally-ignored musical, Crooning Jesus. Orel eagerly auditions, hoping to get the role of Jesus, but he's devastated to learn that not only did Junior Christein win that role with his magnificent voice and powerful connections, but Orel was cast as Judas. He threatens to back out, but Mr. Armiture wins him over with the argument that with no Judas there'd be no Christianity and that he'd be considered one of Christianity's biggest "heroes." On the night of the play Mr. Armiture is tense: not only is Junior's Broadway-producer uncle Bernie in attendance, but so are Lily and Leaf, the infinitely more popular two-thirds of The Crucifolk. Junior performs well, but the audience doesn't like that Orel isn't Jesus, and they're all simply bored with the show. Orel's performance, a lavish song-and-dance diatribe against Jesus, goes over much better and the show is considered a success except to Mr. Armiture--Uncle Bernie informs him that if not for the Judas number, the play would be "forgettable." His point is proven three weeks later with everyone in town singing "I Hate You, Jesus"; even Reverend Putty leads the congregation in joyously singing the tune. The episode ends with Orel realizing what the implications of the song were. This is the first episode since the Christmas special that did not feature the regular opening-title music.
27	17	"Presents for God"	Chris McKay	Mark Rivers	June 18, 2007	216
Reverend Putty delivers a sermon extolling how lost souls are "God's presents" before descending into self-pity over the town's repression. Wanting to cheer him up, Orel and Doughy venture into the nearby town of Sinville where they encounter massive partying and Catholics. Orel and Doughy are steered towards a brothel. They send three of the prostitutes to Putty so he can "save" them; very grateful for this encounter, a relaxed, cigarette-smoking Putty thanks Orel and suggests "every Christian should experience such glory!" Orel takes this literally and steers the prostitutes of Sinville to Moralton and sets up a soul-saving service. The vast population of lonely, repressed men eagerly take advantage of it; Orel and Doughy have soon raked in over $4,000 while the town experiences a massive outbreak of STDs. While setting up a rendezvous, Clay discovers that Orel is behind the prostitution ring and orders him into his study--in one hour. He then resumes making the arrangements with a now-unnerved Orel as the show ends.
28	18	"Orel's Movie Premiere"	Orel Puppington (Chris McKay)	Orel Puppington (Dino Stamatopoulos)	July 2, 2007	220
Orel holds a premiere in his backyard in front of his family and almost all of Moralton's authority figures. Using exceptionally crude stop-motion and a voice-over script, Orel and Doughy recreate the events of "The Lord's Greatest Gift," "God's Chef," and "Charity." But Joe gets restless and seizes the microphones and the opportunity to berate and insult everyone present. Already perturbed by the events and their onscreen portrayals, the audience (except Coach Stopframe) is silent while Orel bemoans Joe's actions and ends the show by musing about misinterpretation while holding the Bible.
29	19	"Nature" (Part 1)	Chris McKay	Dino Stamatopoulos & Nick Weidenfeld	July 9, 2007	212
While Orel and Clay are wrapping up yet another lecture session in the study, Orel notices his dad's hunting trophy, and Clay decides to take him on a hunting trip over the weekend to bond. After viewing Clay's large armory, Orel receives (then is relieved of) Ol' Gunny, the family pistol, and father and son head to the Moralton Nature Reserve. The trip quickly turns sour as Clay starts drinking immediately and Orel can't deal with the idea of killing an animal. Frustrated with Orel's lack of action when a deer licks him, an inebriated Clay shoots the deer and then kills a hunting dog he mistakes for a rabbit. Tensions escalate that night as Clay gloats over his kills (and roasts the dog over a spit and eats it) while Orel is alarmed at how drunk his dad is and suggests that he's too drunk to hunt. Clay sadly reveals that he hates himself before going off on a wild woman and children cursing rant, then grows disturbingly despondent about his life before finally screaming at the top of his lungs. Terrified by his father's outburst, Orel accidentally fires the pistol he's holding and shouts "Dad!" as the episode ends with a "To be continued" cliffhanger.
30	20	"Nature" (Part 2)	Chris McKay	Dino Stamatopoulos & Nick Weidefeld	July 16, 2007	219
After a recap of the events of Part One, Part Two opens to reveal that Orel did not shoot Clay; he destroyed two of his remaining bottles of liquor, much to Clay's anger. For the first time in the series, Orel directly confronts his father, screaming "You become a bad person when you drink!" Furious at this accusation, Clay attempts to punish Orel with his belt again but is too drunk to remove it properly and gives up. Deciding instead to finally "make Orel a man," he grabs his rifle and accidentally shoots Orel in the leg. He rather glibly blames the incident on Orel, who's begging for help. Clay fashions a crude tourniquet from the sleeve of Orel's lucky shirt, then drinks all the rubbing alcohol Orel had brought along just to spite him. Orel angrily growls "I hate you," and Clay utters a smarmy "Hate away, sister. Hate away" before passing out. A bear comes along, attracted by the smell of the roasting dog carcass, and focuses on Clay; Orel is forced to shoot the bear to save his father. The next morning finds Clay coming out of his drunken slumber to ask Orel for his sleeping bag to cover his eyes from the sun. He then returns to sleep for 13 hours, from which he awakens refreshed but with no memory of the previous night. When he sees the bear carcass he turns to Orel and says "Make me proud, Son, and tell me you killed that bear yourself." After some thought, Orel lies that Clay was one who killed the bear. Confused, Clay accepts the lie and takes Orel to Dr. Potterswheel. Back in his room being fed bacon and eggs by Bloberta under Dr. Potterswheel's advice that fatty food will help his leg clot, Orel asks her why she married Clay. Bloberta responds: "Why not?" Orel declares that his father "changes" when he's drunk. Bloberta blithely remarks that his father doesn't change; his "true nature" emerges when he's drunk. The episode ends with Orel quietly eating his food while the blue bird seen following him in Part One looks on from the tree branch outside. The episode was dedicated to John Cassavetes.

=== Season 3 (2008) ===
No. overall	No. in season	Title	Directed by	Written by	Original release date	Prod. code
31	1	"Numb"	Chris McKay	Dino Stamatopoulos	October 9, 2008	301
Episode 1 of 13: "Numb" opens and closes with the song "No Children" by The Mountain Goats and takes place during the events of "Nature (Part One)" and "Nature (Part Two)", showing what Bloberta was doing while Clay and Orel were away. It starts with Clay waking up to take Orel away and Bloberta unenthusiastically watching from the window. She later masturbates with a small power drill in bed before returning it to her collection of hardware tools she uses as dildos. In the process she pulls out a photo album full of pictures of her and Coach Stopframe together, plus a few pictures of Shapey. Examining those photos, she realizes that Block isn't Shapey and proceeds to try to get Shapey back "for sentimental reasons." At the Posabules', both Block and Shapey show love to Bloberta and Mrs. Posabule slams the door, leaving Block with Bloberta. Bloberta takes both boys back home with her, then goes to meet Coach Stopframe at the pub while Block and Shapey bond. Bloberta tries to rekindle things with Stopframe, but he shuts her down and says he only started something with her to get close to Clay. After this, Bloberta desperately seeks Reverend Putty's attention; after climaxing from her pleas, he tells her to leave. Distraught, and desperate to feel something, Bloberta goes to Nohammer's Hardware and buys a large jackhammer; using it as a vibrator, she mutilates her vagina. She goes to Dr. Potterswheel, who prescribes powerful painkillers after examining her. She uses them, then uses the jackhammer again; she further injures herself but numbs the pain to a pleasurable experience. She returns to Potterswheel with more severe injuries, and Potterswheel is shown to be sexually fascinated with his patients' physical pain. Potterswheel sends her home with an even stronger dosage of painkillers; also, she ends up taking Potterswheel's handkerchief home with her. She gets into bed and the combination of desperation and physical sensitivity gives her an orgasm just at the thought of Potterswheel. Excited by her discovery and new feelings of completeness, she returns to the clinic later that day, but Potterswheel rejects her when he finds no new injuries. After he refuses to look at her, he gets Clay's call that he shot Orel in the leg; Bloberta gazes distantly at the wall, only slightly affected when Orel's name pops up. The episode ends from Clay's POV as he stumbles drunk through the house and up the stairs. He stops outside of Orel's room and overhears Bloberta and Orel's conversation from the end of "Nature {Part Two}" about why Bloberta married Clay. She momentarily breaks down after leaving his room, then becomes cold and distant upon seeing Clay. As the credits roll they two climb into their separate beds, both looking completely cold, as if waiting to die. Note: This is actually the first episode of Season 3, but the real second episode, "Grounded, was aired as the first.
32	2	"Grounded"	Cameron Baity	Scott Adsit & Dino Stamatopoulos	April 1, 2008 (Note: The second episode of the third season, "Grounded", originally aired on April 1, 2008 as part of a series of sneak peeks of upcoming premieres as part of Adult Swim's annual April Fools' Day joke on its audience. The episode later made its official debut on October 14, 2008)	302
Episode 2 of 13: Grounded immediately follows the events of the episode "Innocence". Four weeks before the hunting trip, Clay finds Orel holding a neighborhood kids' bloodletting in the upstairs bathroom and grounds him from church for one month. After only a few days, Orel seems to go crazy, jonesing for church. He manically draws a church on his bedroom wall trying to get closer to church. On the second Sunday, Clay tells Orel that going to church gives people insurance against going to Hell. Locked in his room, Orel builds a model church, which Clay takes away from him. The next week, a deranged Orel leaves the house, finds his church by the garbage, and wears it like a costume. Running down the street, crazed and calling himself a church, he slams into Doughy and they search for a cross for the top of his steeple. They find a metal cross in the form of the plus sign on the roof of the "Morbidly Plus-Sized" clothing store. Just when they place it on Orel's steeple, lightning strikes it and Orel finds himself floating in an endless nothingness. He expects to meet God, but he's merely alone...nowhere. He suddenly sees a tiny light that might be God, but is then violently yanked back into the living world, where he's being revived in the emergency room. Orel now becomes obsessed with dying again to get closer to God, because he's still grounded from church. He tries suicide twice: once by electrocuting himself in a light-bulb socket, and once by having Doughy apply electrified defibrillator paddles to him. After his third near-death experience, a bizarre nightmare of familiar and prophetic visions with the song "Airetaina" by the High Priestess playing, including seeing himself say "I am a church" backwards, he awakens and tells the six people around his bed that he saw Heaven and it looked nothing like it was always described to him. Clay tries to silence him, and at home he hits him with his belt until the enlightening experience has been beaten out of him. The episode ends where "Nature (Part One)" begins, with Orel saying that he'll "never do THAT with THOSE in THERE for that LONG ever again!" but this time we know he's talking about "flatlining" to meet God. After Orel's punishment, Clay invites him on a father-son outing. The end credits include pictures from previous episodes, including "Nature (Part One)" and "Nature (Part Two)". This episode aired on April 1 as an April Fools' prank where Adult Swim showed new episodes of upcoming show seasons without announcing it.
33	3	"Innocence"	Chris McKay	Dino Stamatopoulos	October 16, 2008	308
Episode 3 of 13: This episode is four weeks and a day before the events of "Nature", picking up directly from "School Pageant," with the townspeople realizing that the song Orel sang in the school musical is blasphemous and fearing that God will punish Moralton for it (citing various signs, like how Orel raised the dead in Season 1). But Reverend Putty makes the (for Moralton, surprisingly realistic) analysis that maybe Orel does so many zany and blasphemous things because the townsfolk give him bad advice, which he then misinterprets. At Putty's urging, they agree to stop giving him advice. This is quickly challenged; a guilt-stricken Orel seeks to make amends for making the song so popular. First he goes to his father, who directs him to Reverend Putty, who tries to make Orel understand that he doesn't need to atone, that God understands he was innocent. He gives up and sends Orel to Miss Sculptham. Orel informs Miss Sculptham that Putty said children are always innocent; she replies that everyone is innocent until age 18 and tells him about the Children's Crusade and how children are innocent and pure. She sends him to the Christeins'; Orel tells Mr. Christein that God is angry with him, and the family paints lamb's blood on their doorframe, citing how it keeps away plagues and the wrath of God, and remarks that the markings show God that they are innocent. Orel leaves with a directive: find some innocent blood. Orel first heads to the blood bank, but it's closed. He then runs into Coach Stopframe outside the bar next door, where he and Clay had been drinking together. Orel tells Stopframe everything he has learned, but Stopframe calls the painting of blood a "waste of perfectly good virgin blood." Stopframe tells Orel that if he bathes in virgin blood, he can stay young, citing "Gothic erotica" as his source. Orel runs off in search of virgin kids while Stopframe informs Clay that everything is all right. The townspeople watch with alarm as Orel leads his friends Doughy, Billy, Tommy, and Maryenetta back to his house, all wielding knives and other cutting tools. The next morning, Orel goes to a tired and inebriated Clay for clarification. Clay asks if Orel has been listening to his "elderlies"; upon receiving the affirmative, he tells Orel that he is doing everything right. It ends with Orel bathing in blood he has collected from the town's children and provides the background for the beginning of the episode "Grounded."
34	4	"Alone"	Ethan Marak	Chris McKay; Dino Stamatopoulos	October 21, 2008	303
Episode 4 of 13: This episode is unique in that Orel does not appear in it, though he is heard on an in-show radio broadcast. The story takes place the evening before the wilderness outing depicted in the episode "Nature (Part One)" and revolves around Nurse Bendy, Miss Sculptham, and Ms. Censordoll, three female Moraltonites who each live an isolated life. Nurse Bendy plays house with teddy bears she calls her "family" because she suffers from loneliness stemming from the fear that people only care about her for sex. She suffers a breakdown when a teddy bear falls and lands on her back in a suggestive position, making her think that her proxy for a loving husband is only interested in sex as well. Miss Sculptham was previously raped and impregnated by Mr. Creepler. She gave herself an abortion (this is strongly implied by the bloody coathanger she fixes) but remains infatuated with him because she experienced sexual gratification through him. Finally, Ms. Censordoll's obsession with chicken eggs comes from her not having human eggs; when she was a baby, her mother had her sexual organs surgically removed. It's suggested that her immaculacy has given her a God complex and that she might be plotting something sinister: she keeps a scale-model replica of the town and all of its citizens.
35	5	"Trigger"	Ross Shuman	Mark Rivers & Dino Stamatopoulos	October 23, 2008	304
Episode 5 of 13: This episode happens before "Nature (Part One)" and "Nature (Part Two)". Doughy is first seen playing baseball alone. He gets injured, asks his parents for a bandage, and they shove him away. He becomes more depressed watching various fathers bonding with their children. He throws a rock at a squirrel father and son and claims he feels no remorse for it. He hears gunshots and finds Orel and Clay practicing shooting a handgun; Clay scolds Orel's poor marksmanship. Doughy tries his hand at shooting and does much better than Orel. He claims that because he feels invisible, he's better able to focus; he shows little remorse at the idea of killing something. This happens before the eventful hunting trip, so Clay orders Orel to keep the gun 24 hours a day until he learns to use it and tells Doughy to help him. Craving attention and wanting Clay's approval, Doughy happily takes the task. Seeing that Orel's nervous tic, caused by sadness, makes him a terrible shot, Doughy deliberately tries to upset Orel, hoping to get more praise from Clay. Eventually Doughy takes Orel's place in the family and phases Orel out; Clay even teaches Doughy to smoke. Depressed as Doughy once was, Orel now shoots easily, no longer bothered by Doughy's attempts to upset him. Overjoyed that Orel can now shoot a gun properly, Clay has no more use for Doughy; when Doughy tries to take Orel's place on the hunting trip, Clay tells him that the offer was just a ploy to get Orel to learn to shoot. Once again, Doughy is ignored.
36	6	"Dumb"	David Cromer	Dino Stamatopoulos; Nick Weidenfeld	October 29, 2008	306
Episode 6 of 13: This episode tells of Joe, the resident bad kid in Moralton. The episode takes place right before and slightly after "Nature". Joe is the son of Dr. Secondopinionson, who is unable to participate in his son's life due to his rapidly increasing age and senility. This lack of parental authority damages Joe and he acts out in order to receive attention; he constantly derides everything around him as dumb, eats only sweets, and does outrageous things because no one in his house has the authority to stop him. His only real parental figure is a woman with a monotone, masculine voice who claims to be his half-sister, whom Joe verbally abuses every time they interact. Joe has a morbid fear of aging because he resents his father for being too old and arthritic to be able to do anything with him, and is still angry over his mother's death, of "old age", during childbirth. After seeing Orel going on the hunting trip with his father, Joe attempts to find a father figure in his uncle, Coach Stopframe, who informs him that his mother didn't die in childbirth, shooing him off with a reference to Nurse Bendy. Nurse Bendy reveals that she dyes her black hair blonde, and had a child "like, twenty years ago". Joe corrects her and says twelve, his age. She invites him to her apartment, where she describes her teddy bear son as having Joe's characteristics, like having recently been in a play. It mirrors his actions as he sticks his tongue out and mocks it. The two of them realize that they are mother and son and that Joe's father had been lying about his mother's death. Nurse Bendy peevishly says that somebody should teach Dr. Secondopinionson a lesson. Joe returns home and brutally beats his father. His half-sister explains that the identity of Joe's mother was the first thing that his father forgot when he started to lose his memory and that is why he thought Joe's mother was dead. Joe then demands to know why his half-sister never told him that his mother was alive. She replies: "Why should I tell you anything? Like you said, I'm not your mom." Joe accepts this as his sister tenderly cleans the blood from his face. When he returns to the hospital, carrying a suitcase and intending to move in with Nurse Bendy, he sees "Sonny" Bear in the trash outside. When he asks why she threw away the teddy bear, Nurse Bendy explains that she'd rather have Joe as her son than Sonny. The episode ends with the two of them affectionately sticking their tongues out at each other as "Failsafe" by The Choir Practice plays.
37	7	"Help"	Duke Johnson	Scott Adsit & Dino Stamatopoulos	November 4, 2008	309
Episode 7 of 13: This episode is a flashback that Bloberta has when Orel asks her why she married Clay. It begins with a group of women showing off their engagement rings; everybody is getting married except for Bloberta. Principal Fakey's future wife is seen here, sure that their marriage will be successful (in the present, Fakey treats his wife poorly and has an affair with Nurse Bendy). The women of Moralton gather in Miss Censordoll's basement to make protest signs. Bloberta insists on helping, trying to prove how clever she is. Censordoll is not impressed with her abilities and shoos her away. Bloberta goes home to find her parents, brother, and sister singing. She tries to join in but is stopped abruptly. Her domineering mother praises her other children and neglects Bloberta; she is especially harsh on her husband, who cringes in fear. Her mother orders her to clean her room; her father comes in nervously and tells her how he tries to include her in family things but her mother won't have it. She has a flask, pointing to a drinking problem. Later, at Fakey's wedding, she notices Clay, who admits that he thought the wedding was a "regular service"; he thought it would be awkward to leave. Clay is handsome, pure-of-heart bachelor; assuming he is good husband material, Bloberta asks him to go to the reception with her. They order apple juice and sit down to talk. Bloberta questions why Clay doesn't "'drink' drink" and assures the righteous Clay that "Jesus drank a lot" and he should too. Clay decides to try alcohol, overindulges, and becomes very drunk. Bloberta asks him to dance and pressures him into proposing. Clay refuses, unready for marriage. At this point, Clay is much like Orel: he's a kind, decent, pious person who mostly wishes to study his Bible at home. A few drinks later, Clay has lost most of his inhibitions and is leering at nearby young women. Bloberta leaves him to go to the bar, announcing to the bartender she has given up drinking. She begins to furiously clean the bar while Clay flirts with women around him. Annoyed with Clay's actions, Bloberta gets up and punches him, knocking him out. She is seen the next day tending to his wounds and explaining how much she "helped" him and how much he "should need" her. Stumbling over words, Clay agrees to marry her. It's a rushed decision, they know little about each other, and they seem unhappy from the start; Clay drinks through the whole reception while Bloberta angrily watches and obsessively cleans. The credits roll with pictures of the wedding. A song is rolled in the opening and closing sequence "Old College Try" by The Mountain Goats.
38	8	"Passing"	Chris McKay	Dino Stamatopoulos	November 5, 2008	305
Episode 8 of 13: This episode, mirroring "Help," is a flashback that explores Clay's relationship with his parents. It begins with Clay giving Orel "Ol' Gunny," then flashes back to Clay as a child: his mother doted on him endlessly, much to his uninterested father's chagrin, who seems completely unaffected by the religious extremism of his wife and the other Moralton citizenry. He expresses constant doubt and takes God's name in vain, at one point claiming that "there are no miracles." Looking through old photo albums with his mother, little Clay discovers pictures of his mother pregnant, presumably with him, but it's revealed that she suffered 10 miscarriages before successfully bearing him. It's hinted that during the failed pregnancies she smoked, drank, and engaged in activities like jumping on a trampoline and riding rollercoasters, but she says that during her pregnancy with Clay she was too busy praying to do any of that. Devastated by the news that he is not indeed his mother's "precious only-ever" child, Clay pretends to shoot himself with "Ol' Gunny". His father discovers the ruse and forces Clay to stop, and the stress gives his mother a fatal heart attack; as she dies she cries out to God to take her life instead of her son's. Clay's father blames him for her death from then, frequently beating him to express his frustration. Clay actively seeks these punishments; they're the only attention he can get from his emotionally-distant parent. The episode ends with Clay's father giving him "Ol' Gunny," insisting he can't bear to have it around anymore since it's "tainted with blood." Clay attempts to defend himself from his father's blame, but when he looks up, his father is gone. The episode's final shot is adult Clay staring into his drink. The song that plays throughout the episode and during the closing sequence is "Love Love Love" by The Mountain Goats.
39	9	"Closeface"	Sihanouk Mariona	Dino Stamatopoulos & Nick Weidenfeld	November 11, 2008	307
Episode 9 of 13: This episode, about the Annual Arm's-Length dance at Orel's school, begins with a quick recap of "The Lord's Prayer" before showing Principal Fakey introducing the chaperone, Reverend Putty, then a flashback of Kim and Stephanie kissing as a younger Reverend Putty makes the same speech. Kim cheerfully claims that she's not interested in the opposite sex and kisses Stephanie. After getting a good laugh, she insists they go to the dance together and kiss in front of Reverend Putty. Having visibly enjoyed the first kiss, Stephanie agrees. In the present, Orel is working part-time in Stephanie's store when Doughy's parents come in asking for some nonsensical sex toys, then laugh and start making out, much to Stephanie's annoyance. Another flashback shows Kim in a room with Stephanie insisting that they "practice" kissing more. Not realizing that Kim's joking around, Stephanie eagerly agrees. When Kim leans in to kiss Stephanie, Stephanie's eyes cross, showing Kim as a one-eyed smiling version of herself that Stephanie dubs "Closeface." In the present, Orel tells Stephanie he has no crush to ask to the dance. Another flashback shows Kim and Stephanie waiting in a hallway; Kim repeatedly attempts to kiss Stephanie whenever Reverend Putty or Carl walks past, laughing hysterically every time the two men react, then reacting negatively to Stephanie's request for a real kiss. Stephanie realizes that Kim was only pretending to have feelings for her. In the present, Orel prays in his room for God for help and a sudden interruption from Block reminds Orel that he does have a crush: Christina Posabule. Orel takes Block back to the Posabules an excuse to visit Christina, but claims Block ran off upon arrival. When Orel and Christina start to kiss, Orel sees a "Closeface" version of Christina, but the moment is cut short when her father slams the door in his face. Orel sadly returns to the shop, where Stephanie explains that Orel saw his own "Closeface". Determined that Orel have a better time at the dance than she did, Stephanie helps him sneak Christina to it. Outside, Reverend Putty says he knows Stephanie's a lesbian but says she and Kim never would've worked out: not because they're both women, but because Kim never really cared about her. The episode ends with Orel and Christina dancing happily, holding each other while the rest dance at arm's-length as Reverend Putty joins Stephanie in singing "Closeface".
40	10	"Sundays"	Scott Adsit	Dino Stamatopoulos; Nick Weidenfeld	November 13, 2008	310
Episode 10 of 13: "Sundays" takes place throughout the entire series, so named because each scene takes place on a Sunday. The episode follows the lives of two Moralton women, Florence and Dottie: two recently-divorced single mothers with limited visitation rights to their kids. Dottie is attractive and stuck-up; Florence is fat and frumpy. They strike up an tenuous friendship and move into an apartment together. Florence is attracted to Reverend Putty, but he is clearly disgusted by her and attracted to Dottie, as Dottie callously, constantly reminds Florence. As events from previous episodes take place in the background, such as Orel raising his zombie army, Florence eventually tires of Dottie's haughty attitude and ends their friendship, devastating Dottie. Later, Florence is alone at an all-you-can-eat buffet with Putty and manages to drag him back to her apartment. Though very reluctant, Putty eventually succumbs and they have sex, but he shouts Dottie's name as he climaxes; he leaves in shame as Florence cries in humiliation. Listening through the door, Dottie is initially pleased to hear Putty yell her name instead of Florence's, but is immediately saddened by Florence's crying. The final scene takes place after the events of "Nature", with Putty preparing to deliver a sermon on hope, then noticing that his entire congregation is depressed and lost. He searches the pews for Orel, his last ray of hope, but finds him looking as dejected as everyone else and with a cast on his leg. Clay isn't present. The episode concludes with Putty seeming to give up too: changing his sermon title from "Hope" to "Hopeless."
41	11	"Sacrifice"	Chris McKay	Dino Stamatopoulos	November 17, 2008	311
Episode 11 of 13: This episode starts with a flashback to the episode "Numb" that shows Clay finding Dr. Potterswheel's handkerchief at home; the rest of it happens very shortly after the conclusion of "Sundays." Reverend Putty, as dejected as the rest of the congregation, delivers a quick Easter sermon about how nothingness can mean hope, as when the tomb was opened after Jesus' death. Clay has skipped church to drown his sorrows at Forghetty's. Reverend Putty, Officer Papermouth, and Potterswheel join him later; as Putty enters, he breaks up with Florence. Clay launches into a series of alcohol-fueled despondent rants, threatens to kill someone if he must go to work, and claiming he's made so many sacrifices for his family. He mocks Papermouth for Florence sleeping with another man (hinting that it's Putty) and implies that Potterswheel gave his wife an overdose of painkillers when she was sick. Clay rants about relationships and tries to goad everyone into hitting him, but the bartender and three men walk out of the bar, deciding that he's not worth it. Clay angrily fumes that the town's role-models have made Orel "sensitive". At home, Orel tries unsuccessfully to call Clay at the bar and Bloberta searches frantically for Potterswheel's handkerchief. Shapey says his first complete sentence: "When I'm thirsty, it feels how I feel when I'm alone," and Orel remarks on how things have changed. The episode ends with Clay going into the nature reserve and coming back with a bear (presumably the same bear killed in "Nature (Part Two)") strapped to the roof of his car.
42	12	"Nesting"	Joshua A. Jennings	Dino Stamatopoulos	November 19, 2008	312
Episode 12 of 13: This episode begins with a flashback to when Orel was picketing eggs during the episode "Offensiveness". Clay walks in complaining of his dead-end job while it is revealed that Bloberta is knitting Orel a picket blanket. Orel decides to see the mayor; upon walking in, he discovers that the Mayor of Moralton is his own father, Clay. Enthralled, Orel is assured he can get the eggs banned, since Censordoll is reluctantly picketing for the sake of picketing. Clay is reluctant to ban the eggs, claiming that Censordoll has great power in the town and banning eggs would be wrong. He pulls out a drawer, revealing a threat-letter written by Censordoll claiming Clay's days in office would be numbered if he dared ban her eggs. While stating that people don't always says what's on their minds, he has a somewhat-erotic vision of his mother as a giant chicken and himself as an egg desperately trying to reunite with his mother, revealing his Oedipus Complex for his dead mother. Fearful of this realization, he quickly bans the eggs. Three months later, after the Easter sermon, Orel is in Figurelli's store running into Censordoll, who is briefly compassionate and speaks of how Clay only wants death and she desires life. Mesmerized by the tenderness, Orel agrees with her and becomes her campaign manager for her race to become mayor. Clay sees a rally with Orel and Censordoll, and after her speech, he tells Orel to see him in his study. Orel appears completely numb to Clay's threats as he pleas to keep his job. In the fall, the two have a debate. Clay gives his opening speech to the town, but has another fantasy about his deceased mother; obviously flustered, he finishes his speech quickly. Censordoll quickly concedes the race and leaves. Frustrated, Clay goes to Orel and apologizes (half-heartedly) for being a poor father and shooting him and demands to know her plans. Orel admits he doesn't know. Clay doesn't believe him, becomes angry, and leaves after taking back everything he'd said and stating he was happy to shoot Orel. On to the present, Clay is at Forghetty's at Christmas, leaning in to kiss Coach Stopframe, but he quickly stops to "tend to business" with Censordoll. He vents to her about how hopelessly pathetic and powerless he is and how he wishes to release his tension with no risk of making another child. Censordoll promises to mother him and assures that her barren body will be all the tension release he needs, if he listens to her. They passionately make out as they fondle a chicken egg.
43	13	"Honor"	David Tuber	Dino Stamatopoulos; David Tuber	December 18, 2008	313
Episode 13 of 13: The series finale begins with a brief flashback to the end of "The Best Christmas Ever" as Orel professes his absolute faith in God. A rapid-fire montage shows scenes of all the events since, culminating at Forghetty's with Clay and Coach Stopframe nearly kissing before being interrupted by Miss Censordoll. Seeing them make out, Stopframe leaves, vomits, and becomes angry and despondent. He starts to see Clay's face everywhere in town and realizes he still has feelings for him. Meanwhile, Orel's cast finally comes off, but Dr. Potterswheel informs him that he'll be crippled for the rest of his life because of the shooting. A despondent Orel heads home, trying to find a way to talk to his father. He finds Clay drinking in his study, pretending to lecture the stuffed bear Orel shot about the Fifth Commandment (in his words, "Honor thy father. Not mother, just thy father"). Conflicted, Orel asks Reverend Putty how to honor his father, and Putty suggests asking someone who likes Clay as much as "women like jerks" and directs him to Coach Stopframe. Meanwhile, Stopframe has become completely apathetic towards everyone except Orel. As Stopframe and Orel talk, they bond over Christmas-caroling, much to Clay's chagrin, as he had been trying to spend time with Stopframe. Clay eventually storms angrily into the house and declares that he, Bloberta, Shapey, and Block are going caroling. Meanwhile, at Stopframe's apartment, Orel finds a picture of Stopframe and Clay and deduces the truth about Stopframe's attraction to Clay, but he's still depressed because he still can't figure out how to honor his father. Stopframe points out that Clay did one honorable thing: he created Orel. Clay bursts into the apartment and loudly accuses Coach Stopframe of using Orel the same way he used Bloberta to get to him. He makes several thinly-veiled attempts to declare his love for the coach but cannot commit completely, then he outs himself to Bloberta and she suggests that the family should leave. Coach Stopframe tells Clay "it's too late" for their relationship. Orel tries to get Clay to leave with their family, and Clay and the Puppingtons go home after Clay gives up on mending his relationship with Stopframe. The series concludes with Orel slowly morphing into an adult as Putty gives a radio address about family, noting that while most of the time we're just stuck with who we have, occasionally a "miracle" happens and a family genuinely loves one another. As Putty wraps up his sermon, the final scene is of an adult Orel in his own home, happily married to Christina; they have a 3-year-old daughter, a 12-year-old son, and a puppy. On the wall behind them are photos of the adult Shapey and Block; Shapey has become a police officer and Block is a firefighter. There's also a photo of Clay and Bloberta, still (presumably) unhappily married. The credits roll over the young Orel in his room with the stop-motion camera making a movie; when he finishes, he packs up the figures and equipment, puts them all in a box, and places it under the Christmas tree as a gift for Shapey and Block.

=== Special (2012) ===
Title	Directed by	Written by	Original release date	US viewers (millions)
"Beforel Orel: Trust"	Duke Johnson	Dino Stamatopoulos	November 18, 2012	1.213
The special begins with four-year-old Orel meeting his friends for the first time. After Orel climbs and falls off an electrical tower hurting himself, his friends realize they can tell him anything and he'll believe it, and convince Orel to do it again. A bruised Orel comes home to find Coach Stopframe leaving after he had just finished impregnating Bloberta. Five weeks later, Clay finds out about Bloberta's pregnancy and doesn't understand how it happened. Bloberta questions Clay's confidence in parenting and suggests he use his study to lecture and spank Orel, causing him to flashback to a scene from "Passing" of his father, Arthur Puppington, telling Clay he's not worth hitting. Miss Censordoll arrives at the park to find Orel's friends torturing him more. During Censordoll's questioning, Orel reveals he doesn't know who God is. Clay soon arrives to take Orel to his father's farm in Sinville for eight months while Bloberta is pregnant. When they arrive, Clay quickly drops Orel off as Arthur points a gun at him. Orel calls Arthur "grandpa," but he doesn't believe it until he sees Clay driving away while flipping him off. Arthur has Orel help out around the farm, having him witness a horse giving birth, and teaching Orel about nature and to never trust something without proof. Back in Moralton, Clay receives a call from Censordoll threatening to protest his next mayoral election for having a godless child. Orel and Arthur bond one last time while waiting for Clay, and the two wink at each other. Clay quickly picks up Orel while Bloberta is in the backseat in labor. At the hospital, Clay finally explains God to Orel while Bloberta delivers Shapey on her own, but Orel asks for proof of God, angering Clay. Clay calls Reverend Putty to gather the town for a late night emergency sermon. At the sermon, Putty condemns anyone who asks for proof of God, but Orel misinterprets the phrase "God lies" and asks if God is a lie. Putty ends the sermon and angrily grabs Orel. Putty uses Shapey as proof of God, but Orel says his grandfather told him babies came from nature, displeasing Clay once again. Censordoll and Putty take Orel to the library, introduce him to the concept of hell, and tell him the story of the Binding of Isaac. Later, Clay shows Orel how to pray to God while dismissing everything Arthur told him. After his prayer, Orel writes a final letter to Arthur about how Clay convinced him to not follow his grandfather's advice anymore, and that he'll test his faith by sacrificing Shapey at the altar. After reading the letter, Arthur races to Moralton. At Forghetty's, a sobbing Clay is interrupted by Coach Stopframe celebrating his accomplishment with pink cigars. Orel brings his friends to the church to sacrifice Shapey. As Orel is about to stab his brother, Arthur runs in and kicks the knife out of Orel's hand, sparing Shapey. Orel interprets this as proof that God is real. Later at the police station, Clay confronts his father. Clay states he never explained God or anything else to Orel because Arthur made him feel worthless, but that he now realizes God is the answer to all of Orel's questions. As Orel exits the station, Clay forbids the two from interacting, and Orel reiterates at Clay's insistence that his grandpa is not to be trusted, but then winks at Arthur without Clay noticing. With renewed confidence, Clay takes Orel home and invites him into his study for the first time. We hear a voiceover of Arthur writing a letter to Orel to remain pure of heart and not allow himself to be corrupted by the citizens of Moralton. Arthur drives out of Moralton, flipping it off as he leaves.

== Lost episodes ==
According to Dino Stamatopoulos in the commentary for the series finale, there were seven episode ideas that Adult Swim chose not to produce due to their decision to cancel the series/roll back the number of season-three episodes from 20 to 13. It was suggested that Adult Swim might be willing to make a "Moral Orel special" in the future, but Stamatopolous stated that he declined the offer to move on to other projects, resulting in the creation of "Honor" as a series finale for the character.

Had the show not been cancelled and cut down to 13 episodes, its second half would have played out quite differently: Orel's paternal grandfather would have joined the cast, appearing in an episode that happens after the events of "Sacrifice" while Clay goes to retrieve the body of the bear Orel shot. Most of the season's latter half would focus on Orel's relationship with his dying grandfather, who would help further Orel's emotional growth into adulthood and help him reconcile his faith with life's realities. Other aborted plotlines would involve Clay's affair with Miss Censordoll and Bloberta's affair with Officer Papermouth, culminating in Orel's grandfather's death and Orel's transformation into a goth-type figure in the wake of the loss of the only good parental figure in his life.

Some of the aborted episodes involve:

- Easter - Clay Puppington's father finding out he's terminally ill and moving in with the Puppingtons and sharing a room and bed with Orel. This was originally planned to be the second half of a two-part half-hour special directly following Sacrifice, but plans were nixed following the episode count reduction.
- Untitled - Bloberta and Officer Papermouth becoming lovers, and Bloberta finally achieving happiness through her relationship with the divorced police officer.
- Untitled - A second episode involving Orel and Christina's relationship.
- Narcissism - Reverend Putty becoming cold towards women after the events of "Sunday"/"Sacrifice", which results in him finally getting dates with Moralton women; Florence slims down and Reverend Putty becomes attracted to her and ultimately wins her heart.
- Raped - Miss Sculptham's further attempts to find love, including a lesbian relationship and one with a prisoner, both of which end badly because Moralton society frowns on each relationship and refuses to let her marry either one (a denial that she compares to being raped). She also discovers that when she was raped she was pregnant with twins and her coathanger abortion only killed one of them.
- Nurture - An episode focusing on Shapey and Block: the two unruly boys bond, with the result that each becomes less hellion-like.
- Death - Orel becomes a Christian Goth following the death of his grandfather, getting heavily into the Christian Death Metal band Multiple Godgasm.

=== "Abstinence" ===
There is also another lost episode, "Abstinence", animated entirely by David Tuber and Morgana Ignis, two of MORAL OREL's production staff, that was finished after they learned the show had been canceled. The episode is rendered in a cruder-than-normal style using clay figures, since the animators lacked access to the puppets normally used to create each episode. The episode centers around Doughy instead of Orel, and was originally screened only once at a special live event, "Sunday with Moral Orel" in San Francisco on January 18, 2009. On May 26, 2015, series animator David Tuber uploaded the episode on his YouTube channel.

Title	Directed by	Written by	Release date
"Abstinence"	David Tuber	Dino Stamatopoulos	January 18, 2009
Episode 14 of 13: This episode takes place during and after "Offensiveness". Doughy finds his true calling and becomes a professional "Cock-Blocker", stopping various Moralton residents from making love, but he soon gets into trouble.
