= Moral Orel =

American adult stop-motion animated sitcom (2005–2008)

- Genre: Animated sitcom; Adult animation; Black comedy; Comedy drama; Psychological drama; Satire; Tragicomedy
- Created by: Dino Stamatopoulos
- Voices of: Scott Adsit; Jay Johnston; Carolyn Lawrence; Britta Phillips; William Salyers; Dino Stamatopoulos; Tigger Stamatopoulos
- Composers: Mark Rivers; Eban Schletter
- Country of origin: United States
- Original language: English
- No. of seasons: 3
- No. of episodes: 43 (and 1 special) (list of episodes)

Production
- Executive producers: Dino Stamatopoulos; Keith Crofford; Nick Weidenfeld
- Producers: Alex Bulkley; Corey Campodonico; Ollie Green
- Cinematography: Jeff Gardner
- Editors: Chris McKay; Garret Elkins
- Running time: 11–12 minutes
- Production companies: ShadowMachine; Fragical Productions; Starburns Industries (2012); Williams Street

Original release
- Network: Adult Swim
- Release: December 13, 2005 – November 19, 2012

Moral Orel is an American adult stop-motion animated black comedy drama series created by Dino Stamatopoulos for Cartoon Network's nighttime programming block Adult Swim. It originally aired from December 13, 2005, to December 18, 2008. The series follows the titular Orel Puppington, a young, happy-go-lucky and naïve Protestant who showcases his commitment to God while dealing with the cynicism of his abusive and alcoholic father, his lethargic mother, and the devoutly Protestant town of Moralton in which he resides.

The show, predominantly in the first and second seasons (excluding the "Nature" two-parter), is a straightforward satire of the archetypes of Middle American suburban life, modern-day White Anglo-Saxon Protestant culture, and religious fundamentalism. The "Nature" two-parter and the final season are featured in a non-linear but episode-to-episode continuity, and mark a shift in the series from a satirical black comedy to a nihilistic and bleak psychological drama depicting the convictions and mentalities of other characters (meant as an expansion on subplots from the first two seasons) and exploring heavy topics such as child sexual abuse, rape, abortion, and latent homosexuality.

The final season was aired interspersed with repeats from the first two seasons, as many of the episodes took place in parallel with events of past episodes. The event, which was called "44 Nights of Orel", was hosted by Stamatopoulos and others beginning on October 6, 2008, and running through December 18, when the series finale aired. A prequel special entitled "Beforel Orel: Trust", meant as an exploration of the origin of Orel's Christianity, later aired on November 19, 2012.

Moral Orel received widespread acclaim from critics and audiences for its vocal performances, characterization, emotional weight, and frank depiction of mature subject matter. It has developed a cult following in the years since its initial release.

== Synopsis ==
Moral Orel takes place in the fictional capital city of Moralton in the fictional Bible Belt state of Statesota. According to the globe shown in the opening credits, Moralton is in the exact center of the United States, with a church at the town's exact center. The protagonist is 12-year-old Orel Puppington, a student at Alfred G. Diorama Elementary School, who tries to live by the fundamentalist Protestant Christian moral code as articulated in church or by his abusive father, Clay Puppington. Orel naïvely follows this code to disastrous extremes.

Initially starting off as a satirical black comedy, criticizing religious fundamentalism, the show begins to break down on the subplots established in previous seasons, slowly becoming a dark psychological drama through the final two episodes of the second season ("Nature" and "Nature Part 2"), and then the whole part of the third and final season that touches on the emotionally distressing consequences of the dysfunction caused by the residents of Moralton.

== Production ==
According to Stamatopoulos, the series' creator, the concept for Moral Orel originated in a pilot for a live action series starring the American punk rock musician Iggy Pop as a twelve-year-old boy. The concept was changed into a cartoon at the suggestion of a user on Aspecialthing, an online message board with an audience of comedy fans. The first ten episodes were initially drafted by Stamatopolous alone, and then edited by Jay Johnston and Scott Adsit. The storyboarding, voice-over and animatic stages were then done sequentially with all 10 episodes going through each stage at once before the next stage was completed over the course of an estimated seven months.

== Episodes ==
Season	Episodes	Originally released	
Season	Episodes	First released	Last released
1	10	December 13, 2005	July 31, 2006
2	20	November 13, 2006	July 16, 2007
3	13	October 9, 2008	December 18, 2008
Special		November 19, 2012	

== International broadcast ==
In Canada, Moral Orel previously aired on Teletoon's Teletoon at Night block and currently airs on the Canadian version of Adult Swim.

== Characters ==
- Orel Puppington (voiced by Carolyn Lawrence) is a devout young Christian boy who cheerfully and naïvely deals with an abusive father, an emotionally distant mother and the hypocrisy of the religious adults he encounters. Throughout the series, he learns the true nature of his parents and the town, expanding his child-like worldview. He is optimistic and innocent almost to a fault, ending up in upsetting situations because of this.
- Clay Puppington (voiced by Scott Adsit) is Orel's repressed and hateful father. He is a deconstruction of the typical 50s nuclear fatherly role and holds strongly to a traditional style of parenting. He is a cynical alcoholic and a closeted homosexual who hates his dead-end job (where it is revealed that he is Moralton's mayor) and his wife, Bloberta. He is widely regarded as the series' main antagonist and expresses abusive behavior to his entire family. In his childhood, he had a clingy and overly-attached relationship with his mother until her death. He was led to feel worthless by his emotionally frigid father out of guilt from his mother's death, which affects his emotions and relationship with Orel greatly and has left him broken beyond repair.
- Bloberta Puppington (voiced by Britta Phillips) is Orel's obsessive-compulsive, soft-spoken, yet emotionally distant mother. She tends to ignore all conflicts or problems and shares contempt for her husband, Clay. She is shown to clean things and (in season 3) perform self-mutilation obsessively as a means to distract herself from underlying feelings of inferiority in her household. She is a people-pleaser and wants to help people for love, sometimes to manipulative extremes. While she holds a cheerful yet dimwitted persona, she is secretly depressive and wishes for a better life.
- Shapey Puppington (voiced by Tigger Stamatopoulos), Orel's half-brother, is a misbehaving, developmentally-stunted 7-year-old who does little but yell and scream, usually incoherently, and act out, physically behaves more like a toddler. Until the episode "Sacrifice", his dialogue only consists of a few different words.
- Rev. Rod Putty (voiced by William Salyers), the town's resident pastor of the church, is a laid-back, lonely, and sexually frustrated man to whom Orel looks for advice. At the beginning of the series, he is shown to be bigoted, self-absorbed, and depressed. Because of this, he projects his unstable emotions in his sermons. However, beginning in season 2, he shares a healthy relationship with his estranged daughter Stephanie, a punk-rocker and a lesbian who runs a sex shop. This allows him to become a bit more open-minded, kind, and positive.
- Coach Danielle Stopframe (voiced initially by Jay Johnston, later by Scott Adsit) is Orel's nihilistic and sarcastic school gym teacher and is later revealed to be Shapey's biological father. He engages in both Satanic practices and Christianity, yet is skeptical of religion. He is in love with Orel's father, Clay. While they begin a subtle affair at the end of season one, Clay admits he is in love with him in front of his family in the series finale. He bonds with Orel in the finale and rejects Clay because of how abusive he is towards him.
- Doughy Latchkey (voiced by Scott Adsit) is Orel's sensitive, unintelligent, occasionally neurotic, and easily frightened best friend, who often worries about Orel as he follows him on adventures. His last name comes from the term Latchkey kid, which refers to a child whose parents are less involved or do not care to be in his life. Because of this, he often appears insecure and gloomy when it comes to his home life, which is almost nonexistent because his parents care more about reliving their high school days and having sex than spending time with him.
- Joe Secondopinionson (voiced by Jay Johnston) is the nephew of Coach Stopframe and the son of Nurse Bendy. Known as the school bully, he projects violent behaviors onto his friends and teases them often. However, after he meets his mother, he emotionally softens. Growing up with a senile father who neglected him, he fears being old, causing him to act out in childish and immature behavior.
- Stephanie Putty (voiced by Britta Phillips) is a punk, irreligious lesbian who is later revealed to be Reverend Putty's daughter. She is a town-outsider, is the most level-headed, and is one of the few residents of Moralton to be genuine about her beliefs. She is often a voice of reason for Orel and is described as incredibly warm-hearted, understanding, and empathetic. She serves as a parental figure for him as she develops her relationship with her father.
- Nursula (Nurse) Bendy (voiced by Britta Phillips) is the school's nurse who is stereotyped as a dumb blonde. While initially jaded and snarky at the beginning of the series, she grows into a bubbly and compassionate individual because of her son, Joe. In her backstory, it is revealed she was a victim of sexual abuse and copes through child-like regression. She is very idealistic and wishes for a true family.

== Seasons ==
The first season of the show follows a standard formula, in which Orel hears a sermon given by Rev. Rod Putty in church on Sunday, and then proceeds to have a misadventure based on his attempts to live by his (usually warped) interpretation of the sermon and its lesson. At the end of each episode, his father would sternly put a halt to the situation and "correct" Orel, by means of corporal punishment, only to offer an even more warped interpretation (in the first season, typically one of Clay's "Lost Commandments") of the church sermon. A running gag of the show was that before the ending credits ran, Clay's pants would fall down when he stood from his chair, as he had earlier removed his belt to punish Orel. Throughout the season, the series' primary characters are introduced and various subplots are established, such as Orel's father being a closeted bisexual in love with Orel's gym teacher, and Orel's mother being an unhappily married housewife feeling trapped in her marriage.

The format of the second season of the show breaks that of the first season and begins to build upon subplots introduced in the first season, making them the primary focus of the show. While still the protagonist and primary character, Orel becomes less a catalyst for each episode's events than an unwitting bystander often left confused and dejected at the end, finding himself unable to reconcile his optimistic nature and faith with the corruption and cynicism of the adults around him, particularly his father. The season culminates in a two-part episode dealing with a camping trip during which Orel lost all faith and trust in his father. The season finale—"Nature (Part 1)" and "Nature (Part 2)"—marks a far darker turn in the series' tone, de-emphasizing the cynical parody of the previous episodes in favor of exploring more disturbing themes.

The third and final season of the show is structured as an interconnecting 13-part story dealing with the events leading up to and during the camping trip, and their far-reaching implications. It is revealed that during the trip, Clay gets drunk and shoots Orel in the leg, afterward showing a complete lack of remorse or sense of responsibility. The series culminates in the ultimate dissolution of Clay's relationship with Orel's coach, and the revelation that Orel will one day be able to put his traumatic childhood behind him to raise a better family than the one in which he grew up.

Originally, before being cut down to a 13-episode third season and later cancelled, the show was intended to have two more seasons and evolve into a show titled Moralton that would revolve around the life of the residents of Moralton as a whole.

The series was troubled throughout its run. Against the wishes of creator Stamatopoulos, the Christmas-themed first-season finale, "The Best Christmas Ever", was aired as the series premiere. Adult Swim wanted to debut the show in December as part of a holiday-themed programming block. The episode featured the culmination of numerous story arcs developed throughout the first season and ended with a cliffhanger, confusing viewers and prompting questions on Adult Swim's message boards as to whether or not the episode was a one-off practical joke. When the series eventually premiered, three episodes of the first season were held back from airing because the network's Standards & Practices Department found them to be too dark and sexually explicit. All were eventually approved; two aired in May 2006 and the third aired on July 31, 2006. The series was ultimately canceled with seven scripts left unproduced, cutting the third season down from the intended twenty episodes to thirteen.

== Critical reception ==
In 2015, Brad Stabler of Vice described Moral Orel as a "now-cult classic", and that, "to those who stuck around for three seasons, the program revealed itself to be a rare gem that inverted what to expect from Adult Swim, especially since it evolved into something that was anything but funny." In 2024, a Collider ranking of the best Adult Swim series ranked Moral Orel at number 11, and stated: "As one of Adult Swim's darker comedic TV shows, Moral Orel doesn't pull any punches with its hard-hitting exploration (and critique) of typical suburban life, Protestant culture, and religious fundamentalism."

The series has been described as "Davey and Goliath meets South Park". However, Stamatopoulos denies the comparison with Davey and Goliath, telling The New York Times that Moral Orel grew out of a concept for a send-up of a Leave It to Beaver-style 1950s sitcom that would star Iggy Pop. Many fans of the series have considered Moral Orel an example of the tragicomedy genre, influencing shows such as BoJack Horseman and other series in the format to explore existential and tragic storylines of characters in the series as the show progresses.

== Home releases ==
On April 24, 2007, Volume One: The Unholy Edition was released, which included the first 15 episodes and which covered all of the first season and the first five episodes of the second season. This has been the only release in the US, which was later included as part of the Adult Swim in a Box set in 2009. In October 2007, Madman Entertainment released a similar volume one set in Australia. Starting in 2010, Madman continued releasing the series, starting with a second volume which included the rest of the second season, and then a third volume which included all of the third season. Then, they released the Complete Lessons Collection, which compiled the discs from the previously released volumes.

DVD name	Release date	Ep #	Additional information
Volume One	April 24, 2007	15	This 2-disc boxed set contains the first 15 episodes of the series, uncensored, and in production order ("The Lord's Greatest Gift" through Season 2's "Offensiveness", and includes the entirety of Season 1 along with additional Season 2 episodes "God's Image", "Satan", "Elemental Orel", and "Love"). Special features include a director's cut version of "God's Chef", deleted scenes, audio commentary, and a "behind the scenes" featurette NOTE: This is the only release of the series in North America
Volume Two	2010	15	This one-disc set contains the next 15 episodes of the series, which are the latter half of season two, uncensored, and in production order ("God's Blunders" through "Nature, Part Two"). Special features include character profiles, easter eggs, and trailers NOTE: Only Released in Australia
Volume Three	2011	13	This one-disc set contains the final 13 episodes of the series, which are the entire third season, uncensored, and in production order ("Numb" through "Honor"). Special features include video commentary with series creator Dino Stamatopolous, easter eggs, and trailers NOTE: Only released in Australia
Complete Lessons Collection	2012	43	This 4-disc compilation set contains the entire series, uncensored and in production order ("The Lord's Greatest Gift" through "Honor"). Special features include audio commentary, video commentary, The Awkward 2007 Comic-Con panel, deleted scenes, easter eggs, directors cut episodes, and behind-the-scenes featurettes NOTE: Only released in Australia

The entire show has been available to buy at various digital video on demand stores.

The series has also been made available to watch on HBO Max since September 1, 2020.

== Legacy ==
=== 2012 special ===
After the 2011 Halloween mini-marathon for Mary Shelley's Frankenhole, Orel himself announced the upcoming Moral Orel special and its release "sometime in the near future". "Beforel Orel" was officially announced on Dino's official Twitter page. The special was described in a press release by Adult Swim as "[a] Moral Orel special that sheds light on the origin of Orel's religious nature and the birth of his brother, Shapey". It premiered on Monday, November 19, 2012.

=== Potential film ===
On March 3, 2025, Dino Stamatopoulos posted an image of a script cover, teasing a potential movie. There has been no approval from any of the owners, however the voice actor for Orel, Carolyn Lawrence, was credited in Stamatopoulos' Instagram post.

=== In other media ===
On August 30, 2026, Moral Orel made an appearance in the Robot Chicken special, titled Robot Chicken Adult Swim Special, which was to commemorate the block's 25th anniversary. However, both Orel and Clay Puppington were respectively voiced by Rachel Ramras and Zach Hadel, replacing Lawrence and Adsit.

== See also ==
- Oral Roberts
