= High School USA! =

- Created by: Dino Stamatopoulos
- Written by: Dino Stamatopoulos
- Directed by: John Pham (art); Doug Rowell (animation)
- Creative director: Ben Jones
- Voices of: Vincent Kartheiser; T.J. Miller; Nathan Barnatt; Mandy Moore; Zosia Mamet; Jake Johnson; Dino Stamatopoulos
- Theme music composer: Dino Stamatopoulos
- Opening theme: "High School USA!", performed by Mark Rivers
- Composer: Mark Rivers
- Country of origin: United States
- Original language: English
- No. of seasons: 1
- No. of episodes: 12

Production
- Executive producers: Dino Stamatopoulos; Nick Weidenfeld; Hend Baghdady
- Editors: James Atkinson; Al LeVine
- Running time: 11 minutes
- Production companies: Fragical Productions; Friends Night; ADHD Studios

Original release
- Network: Fox; FXX (Ep. 6)
- Release: July 21, 2013 – January 29, 2015

High School USA! is an American adult animated television series produced by Friends Night and Animation Domination High-Def Studios. The series was created and written by Dino Stamatopoulos. Nick Weidenfeld, Hend Baghdady and Stamatopoulos executive produced the series.

== Plot ==
The show is about the millennial high-school experience, following a clique of sunny, well-meaning students consisting of Marsh Merriwether, Amber Lamber, Cassandra Barren, Brad Slovee, and Lamort Blackstein.

The art style and basic character setup are a parody of Archie Comics.

== Cast ==
| Character | Voice actor | Production Notes |
|---|---|---|
| Marsh Merriweather | Vincent Kartheiser | |
| Amber Lamber | Zosia Mamet | |
| Cassandra Barren | Mandy Moore | |
| Lamort Blackstein | Nathan Barnatt | |
| Brad Slovee | T.J. Miller | |
| Mr. Structor | Jake Johnson | |
| Mr. Merriweather | Dino Stamatopoulos | |
| Officer Dumphy | Jay Johnston | |
| Cyber Bully | Ike Barinholtz | Episode 1 "Bullies" |
| Miriam | Jillian Bell | Episode 11 "Rumspringbreakers" |
| Miss Temple | Alison Brie | Episode 8 "Choices" |
| Ms. Slovee; Startch Girl | Rachel Butera | Episode 4 "Heroes" |
| Student | Charley Damski; Maya Erskine; Jackson Rheingold; Mark Rivers; Valerie Summey | Episode 2 "Sexting" & Episode 8 "Choices"; Episode 2 "Sexting"; Episode 4 "Heroes"; Episode 1 "Bullies" & Episode 8 "Choices" as Doctor; Episode 2 "Sexting" |
| Nico Ninja | Ray Ford | Episode 3 "Adderall" |
| Mrs. Blackstein; Tamar | Jackie Hoffman | Episode 3 "Adderall" & Episode 11 "Rumspringbreakers" |
| Garrett Philanders | Anders Holm | Episode 4 "Heroes" |
| Dolores Barrens | Sally Kellerman | Episode 5 "Adoption", Episode 11 "Rumspringbreakers" & Episode 12 "Sweet 16" |
| Rachel Lewis | Natasha Leggero | Episode 5 "Adoption" |
| Superintendent Andrea Knussler | Chelsea Peretti | Episode 7 "Janitor Day" |
| Unknown Voice | Nick Reczynski | |
| Wally Lamber | Milo Silverstein (Son of show producer/writer Matt Silverstein) | Episode 3 "Adderall" and Episode 6 "Best Friends Forever" |
| Otto | Abe Vigoda | Episode 12 "Sweet Sixteen" |
| Mr. Blackstein; Lucius | Michael K. Williams | Episode 3 "Adderall" & Episode 11 "Rumspringbreakers" |
| Seymour Barren | Ray Wise | Episode 5 "Adoption", Episode 11 "Rumspringbreakers" & Episode 12 "Sweet 16" |
| Mrs. Lamber | Moon Zappa | Episode 3 "Adderall", Episode 6 "Best Friends Forever", Episode 8 "Choices" & Episode 11 "Rumspringbreakers" |

== Episodes ==
| No. | Title | Original release date | Prod. code | U.S. viewers (millions) |
|---|---|---|---|---|
| 1 | "Bullies" | July 21, 2013 | HSU-101 | 2.4 |
Marsh learns a lesson when Brad is accused of bullying. Cassandra gets ready for the “It Gets Better After High School” dance. Note: Originally was rerated TV-MA. Later runs reverted to its original TV-14 rating.
| 2 | "Sexting" | July 27, 2013 | HSU-102 | 1.5 |
When a personal picture of a classmate goes viral, Marsh must rally the other students to make the situation less embarrassing. Note: This has been only aired twice due to its sexual nature.
| 3 | "Adderall" | August 3, 2013 | HSU-103 | 1.1 |
The pressure of the upcoming S.A.T. exams pushes the gang to resort to popping pills. Blackstein needs another extracurricular activity for his college applications, so he joins the school's gay club and tries to hide the fact that he is straight. Note: One airing of this episode has the word "shit" in it, uncensored for a TV-MA-LS rating. Later reruns have the word bleeped to rebroadcast for a TV-14.
| 4 | "Heroes" | August 10, 2013 | HSU-104 | 1.2 |
Marsh is starstruck when he meets his hero Garrett Philanders (Anders Holm), the pioneer of the Candy Diet.
| 5 | "Adoption" | August 17, 2013 | HSU-105 | N/A |
When Cassandra finds out that she is adopted, the gang arranges for her to meet her biological parents in China.
| 6 | "Best Friends Forever" | January 29, 2015 (on FXX) | HSU-106 | N/A |
Amber learns that her parents star in adult films. Note: Because of the highly sexual content and concerns over FCC interference, Fox shelved the episode before its scheduled airdate. It was for a brief time available only to paid subscribers of the Hulu Plus service. It has since been removed completely from the Hulu rotation. The episode finally aired on expanded basic cable network FXX on January 29, 2015.
| 7 | "Janitor Day" | November 2, 2013 | HSU-107 | N/A |
High School USA! is about to lose all of its funding unless the gang can find a way to get test scores up. Due to the lack of funding, Mr. Structor holds Janitor Day when High School USA! is unable to afford the budget to pay for janitors.
| 8 | "Choices" | November 9, 2013 | HSU-108 | N/A |
Amber finds out that she's pregnant. With the help of the gang, she'll have to decide whether to keep the baby or have an abortion. Meanwhile, Blackstein adopts a vicious dog and Mr. Structor falls for a substitute teacher.
| 9 | "The Early 90s" | November 16, 2013 | HSU-109 | N/A |
Mr. Structor challenges the gang to spend a day as if they were back in the 1990s without modern technology and as a result hilarity ensues. Things get worse when they are pursued by a mysterious stalker.
| 10 | "Gun Control" | November 23, 2013 | HSU-110 | N/A |
Cassandra and Amber run for student council presidents against Blackstein and the Weirdo from Home Room. Marsh questions the school's new self-protection policy.
| 11 | "Rumspringbreakers" | November 30, 2013 | HSU-111 | N/A |
Marsh is worried for Brad's safety when Brad has a Spring Break fling with an Amish girl who is planning to go through a sex change.
| 12 | "Sweet 16" | November 30, 2013 | HSU-112 | N/A |
Marsh realizes he has a hard time dealing with death once Cassandra's dad passes away close to her Sweet 16 party. While Officer Dumphy investigates Seymour's death, Brad takes an interest in death.
