= Anomalisa =

2015 film by Charlie Kaufman and Duke Johnson

- Theatrical release poster
- Directed by: Charlie Kaufman; Duke Johnson
- Written by: Charlie Kaufman
- Based on: Anomalisa by Charlie Kaufman^{FF}
- Produced by: Rosa Tran; Duke Johnson; Charlie Kaufman; Dino Stamatopoulos
- Starring: Jennifer Jason Leigh; Tom Noonan; David Thewlis
- Cinematography: Joe Passarelli
- Edited by: Garret Elkins
- Music by: Carter Burwell
- Production companies: Starburns Industries; Snoot Entertainment
- Distributed by: Paramount Pictures
- Release dates: September 4, 2015 (Telluride Film Festival); December 30, 2015 (United States)
- Running time: 90 minutes
- Country: United States
- Language: English
- Budget: $8 million
- Box office: $5.7 million

Anomalisa is a 2015 American adult animated comedy-drama film directed by Charlie Kaufman and Duke Johnson from a screenplay by Kaufman, based on his 2005 audio play that explores the Fregoli delusion, a term Kaufman used as a pen name for himself. It incorporates elements of psychological drama, romantic comedy, and self-reflexive fiction in surrealist style, in a similar vein as Eternal Sunshine of the Spotless Mind, whose screenplay Kaufman penned. Anomalisa follows the British middle-aged customer service expert Michael Stone (David Thewlis), who perceives everyone (Tom Noonan) as identical except for Lisa Hesselman (Jennifer Jason Leigh), whom he meets in a Cincinnati hotel.

Kaufman's audio play premiered in Los Angeles, and featured the voices of Thewlis, Noonan, and Leigh. He opposed adapting the play into a film, fearing loss of artistic merit, but began exploring the idea in 2012 after incorporating edits to the script. Filming faced delays as Starburns Industries initially secured production funding on Kickstarter only to adapt the play as a short film, with stop-motion animation beginning in late 2013. The filmmakers faced struggles with animation technology, a notoriously laborious medium. This was alleviated after Paramount Pictures joined production, enabling the film to be expanded to a feature.

Anomalisa premiered at the Telluride Film Festival on September 4, 2015, and was theatrically released in the U.S. on December 30 by Paramount Pictures. The film received critical acclaim, with praise for its screenplay, direction, and thematic content. It was nominated for an Academy Award for Best Animated Feature, the first R-rated animated film to be nominated in this category, and was nominated for the Golden Globe Award for Best Animated Feature Film. It won the Grand Jury Prize at the 72nd Venice International Film Festival, the first animated film to do so.

== Plot ==
In 2005, middle-aged English-born lonely customer service expert and motivational speaker Michael Stone travels to Cincinnati, Ohio to promote his latest book at a convention at the Fregoli Hotel. He feels distant from everyone around him, whom he perceives as having an identical face and voice, including his wife and son.

Michael practices his speech in his room but is haunted by the memory of an angry letter from a former lover, Bella, whom he abruptly left years ago without an explanation. He arranges to meet her in the hotel bar, but she is still upset and outraged by his invitation to his room, eventually storming out. Going for a walk, Michael mistakes an adult toy store for a children's toy store. Wanting to buy his son a present, he goes in and realizes his mistake, but is fascinated by a Japanese animatronic doll behind the counter.

While taking a shower, Michael hears a unique female voice and rushes from his room to find her. He meets Lisa, an insecure young woman attending the convention with her friend and co-worker Emily. Enraptured by her unique appearance and voice, he invites both women for drinks at the bar. Later, to Lisa's surprise, Michael invites her to his room. Still captivated, he encourages her to sing and tell him about her life. She sings Cyndi Lauper's "Girls Just Want to Have Fun" and after she calls herself an "anomaly", he nicknames her Anomalisa. The two become intimate and eventually have sex.

Michael has a nightmare in which the lower half of his face falls off and the identical people of the world pursue him, claiming they love him and insisting he and Lisa cannot be together. The dream inspires Michael to propose he and Lisa start a new life together. She agrees, but her eating habits during breakfast annoy him, and her voice and face begin to transform into those of everyone else. During his convention speech, Michael suffers a breakdown, claiming he has no one to talk to and ranting about the American government, alienating the audience.

Michael returns to his home in Los Angeles, California. He gives the Japanese animatronic doll to his son, who is nonplussed, and notices a mysterious substance leaking from it. His wife notes its resemblance to semen but dismisses it nonchalantly. She has arranged a surprise party for Michael, but he does not recognize any of the attendees, angering her. Michael sits alone on the stairs as the doll, bearing facial damage in the same locations as Lisa's facial scarring, sings "Momotarō's Song", a Japanese children's song. Lisa writes Michael a letter, saying she hopes they will meet again while Emily, sitting beside her in her car, has her unique face.

== Cast ==
- David Thewlis as Michael Stone, a middle-aged British English-born motivational speaker and customer service expert with a mostly negative attitude. To him, every person looks and sounds the same except Lisa, whom he perceives as different.
- Jennifer Jason Leigh as Lisa Hesselman, a sweet but insecure woman who has come to the hotel to attend Michael's talk about customer service.
- Tom Noonan as everyone else.

== Production ==
=== Development ===
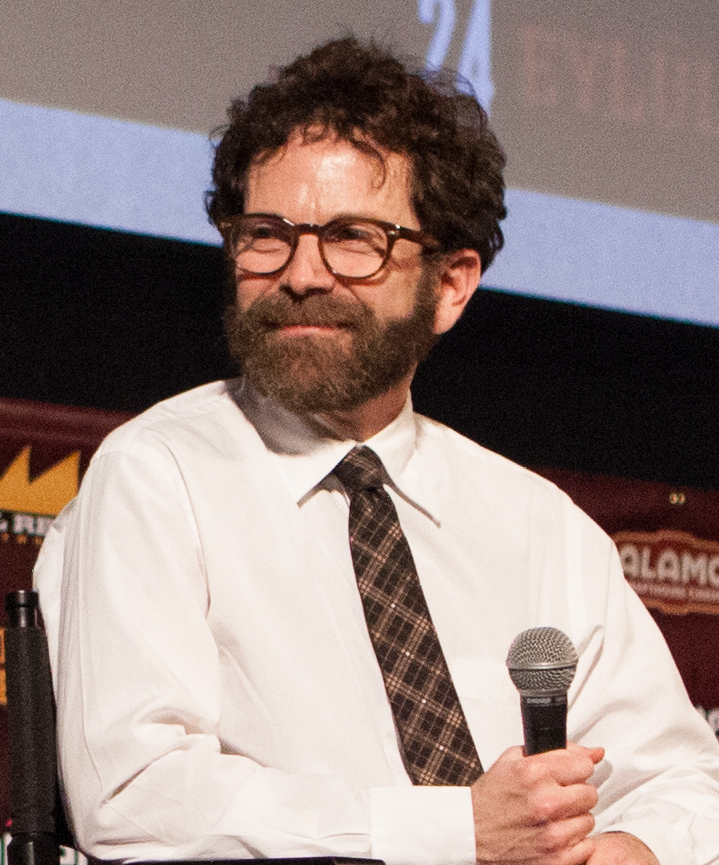
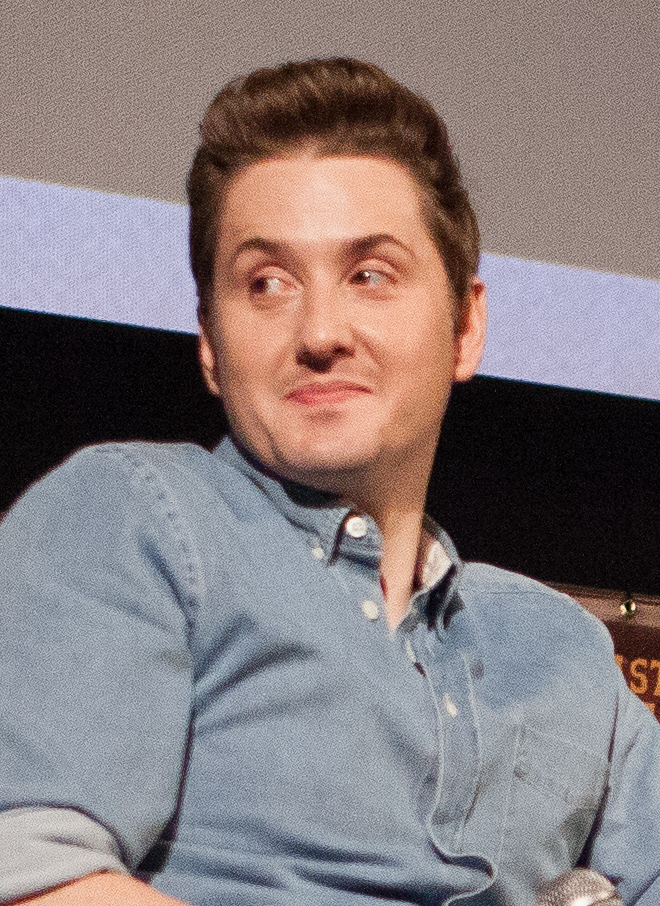
Directors Charlie Kaufman and Duke Johnson at the 2015 Fantastic Fest

The first version of Anomalisa was written and performed in 2005 for the Los Angeles run of "Theater of the New Ear", described as "a concert for music and text, or a set of 'sound plays'" by Carter Burwell, who commissioned and scored them. It was a double bill with Kaufman's Hope Leaves the Theater, and replaced Sawbones, by the Coen Brothers, from the earlier New York run, after that play's actors were unavailable. This Anomalisa was credited to the pen name Francis Fregoli, a reference to the Fregoli delusion, a disorder centered around the belief that different people are in fact a single person who changes appearance or is in disguise. The 2005 performance had Thewlis and Leigh sitting on opposite sides of the stage, with Noonan in the middle; Burwell conducted the Parabola Ensemble, and there was a foley artist.

Kaufman was initially opposed to turning the play into an animated film, saying that the play had "a disconnect between what's being said on stage and what the audience is seeing – there's Tom playing all these characters, there's Jennifer and David having sex while they're really just standing across the stage from each other and moaning. You'd lose that". The film was reinvented, although its script was described by The Guardian as "virtually the same" as that of the original play.

The film's production company, Starburns Industries, sought funding on Kickstarter to "produce this unique and beautiful film outside of the typical Hollywood studio system," where the company believed the film would be inevitably changed from its initial conception. Initially pitched as a short film "approximately 40 minutes in length", the team set a funding goal of $200,000. By the end of the campaign, 5,770 backers had pledged $406,237 to the project. After the success of the Kickstarter initiative, additional funding was secured by the film's production company, Starburns Industries, and the film was expanded to feature length.

=== Animation ===
The puppets were created with 3D printers, with multiple copies of each character. Eighteen Michaels and six Lisas were created. Johnson recounted that the team was told that such realistic puppets would be "disturbing and off-putting", but disagreed, saying that the nature of stop-motion film, with human hands moving puppets for each frame, brought "organic life" to the medium. One goal of the film was for viewers to "forget they were looking at something animated and just get wrapped up in the scene", he said; "the challenge we felt with so much animated stuff is that you're always conscious of the animation, and we kept asking, 'What if we could escape that? What would it be like?'".

Kaufman and Johnson have described the process of stop-motion animation as "laborious" and found challenges in making the puppets look lifelike and relatable. Animator Dan Driscoll said they found people on whom to model the puppets, studied human movement and facial expressions to produce a precise result, created the puppets and built the sets, and finally placed the puppets on the sets and moved them frame by frame to create the illusion of movement. Kaufman said the medium of stop-motion underpins the narrative of Anomalisa by drawing attention to small details viewers would not notice in a live-action film. The film was in production for more than two years.

== Release ==
Anomalisa had its world premiere at the Telluride Film Festival on September 4, 2015. The film went on to screen at the Venice Film Festival on September 8 and the Toronto International Film Festival on September 15. Shortly after, Paramount Pictures acquired its worldwide distribution rights. The film had a limited release on December 30, 2015, and a wider release in January.

The film's DVD and Blu-ray packs were released on June 7, 2016. The Blu-ray Combo Pack with Digital HD includes an in-depth look at the filmmaking process with Kaufman and Johnson and three behind-the-scenes features, including an extended look at the production process and deeper themes of the story. Looks at the sound design and the ground-breaking techniques used to create one of the film's most intricate and intimate scenes are also shown. In the Blu-ray pack, thanks to the DTS-HD Master Audio 5.1 used in the film's production, ambient sound effects such as the hotel bar background can be perfectly heard and combined with the dialogue.

=== Critical response ===
On Rotten Tomatoes, the film holds an approval rating of 92% based on 275 reviews, with an average rating of 8.4/10. The website's critical consensus reads: "Anomalisa marks another brilliant and utterly distinctive highlight in Charlie Kaufman's filmography, and a thought-provoking treat for fans of introspective cinema." The film also has a weighted average score of 88 out of 100 on Metacritic based on 46 reviews, indicating "universal acclaim".

In Time Out David Calhoun awarded the film five out of five stars and wrote, "It's what you imagine might have happened if Charlie Kaufman had got his hands on Up in the Air or Lost in Translation." Drew McWeeny of Hitfix called it "the most shattering experiment yet from Charlie Kaufman" and graded it an A+. LA Weekly's Amy Nicholson gave the film an A and wrote, "Kaufman is taking our brains apart and showing us the gears." The Guardian's Peter Bradshaw gave the film five out of five, naming it his film of the week, and wrote: "It is really funny, and incidentally boasts one of the most extraordinarily real sex scenes in film history. It also scared me the way a top-notch horror or a sci-fi dystopia might ... Is there anyone else in the movies doing such unique and extraordinary work?"

Observer critic Mark Kermode gave Anomalisa three out of five, writing: "Sometimes it falls apart ... But there's something magical about the malaise which raises this above mere misanthropy—a heightened sense of fragile life that perhaps only puppets could hope to achieve." Stephanie Zacharek of Time wrote: "Once you start reckoning with Anomalisa's obsession with self-absorption, the novelty of this one-man pity party begins to wear off."

=== Top ten lists ===
Anomalisa was listed on numerous critics' top ten lists for 2015.

- 1st – Drew McWeeny, HitFix
- 1st – Aaron Hills, The Village Voice
- 1st – Tim Grierson, Screen International
- 2nd – Michael Phillips, Chicago Tribune
- 2nd – Amy Nicholson, L.A. Weekly
- 2nd – Alison Willmore, BuzzFeed
- 2nd – Ella Taylor & Kristopher Tapley, Variety
- 2nd – Glenn Kenny, RogerEbert.com
- 2nd – Matt Singer, ScreenCrush
- 3rd – Alonso Duralde, TheWrap
- 3rd – Matt Goldberg, Collider
- 3rd – Ben Travers, Indiewire
- 3rd – Matt Fagerholm, RogerEbert.com
- 3rd – Dennis Dermody, Paper
- 3rd – Will Leitch, The New Republic
- 4th – Peter Sobczynski & Nick Allen, RogerEbert.com
- 4th – The Guardian
- 4th – John Powers, Vogue
- 4th – Geoff Berkshire, Variety
- 5th – Michael Atkinson, The Village Voice
- 5th – Steve Persall, Tampa Bay Times
- 5th – A.O. Scott, The New York Times (tied with Carol)
- 6th – Kate Erbland, Indiewire
- 6th – William Bibbiani, CraveOnline
- 6th – Erin Whitney, ScreenCrush
- 6th – Todd McCarthy, The Hollywood Reporter
- 7th – Jake Coyle, Associated Press
- 7th – Mike D'Angelo, The A.V. Club
- 7th – Eric Kohn & Jessica Kiang, Indiewire
- 7th – Rafer Guzman, Newsday
- 9th – Noel Murray, The A.V. Club
- 10th – Rodrigo Perez, Indiewire
- 10th – Peter Rainer, The Christian Science Monitor
- 10th – Peter Travers, Rolling Stone (tied with Inside Out)
- Top 10 (listed alphabetically) – Steven Rea, The Philadelphia Inquirer
- Top 10 (listed alphabetically, not ranked) – Stephen Whitty, The Star-Ledger

=== Accolades ===
Award	Category	Recipient	Result
Academy Awards	Best Animated Feature Film	Charlie Kaufman, Duke Johnson, and Rosa Tran	Nominated
Golden Globe Awards	Best Animated Feature Film	Charlie Kaufman and Duke Johnson	Nominated
Golden Reel Awards	Best Sound Editing: Sound Effects, Foley, Dialogue & ADR in an Animation Feature Film	Aaron Glacock, Christopher S. Aud, MPSE	Nominated
Critics Choice Awards	Best Animated Feature	Charlie Kaufman and Duke Johnson	Nominated
Annie Awards	Best Animated Feature	Rosa Tran, Duke Johnson, Charlie Kaufman and Dino Stamatopoulos	Nominated
Annie Awards	Best Directing in a Feature Production	Charlie Kaufman and Duke Johnson	Nominated
Annie Awards	Best Music in a Feature Production	Carter Burwell	Nominated
Annie Awards	Best Voice Acting in a Feature Production	Jennifer Jason Leigh	Nominated
Annie Awards	Best Editing in a Feature Production	Garret Elkins	Nominated
Austin Fantastic Fest	Best Director	Duke Johnson and Charlie Kaufman	Won
Austin Fantastic Fest	Fantastic Features	Duke Johnson and Charlie Kaufman	Won
Golden Tomato Awards	Best Animated Movie 2015	Anomalisa	3rd Place
Independent Spirit Award	Best Feature		Nominated
Independent Spirit Award	Best Director	Charlie Kaufman and Duke Johnson	Nominated
Independent Spirit Award	Best Screenplay	Charlie Kaufman	Nominated
Independent Spirit Award	Best Supporting Female	Jennifer Jason Leigh	Nominated
American Cinema Editors	Best Edited Animated Feature Film	Garret Elkins	Nominated
Mill Valley Film Festival	Audience Award	Charlie Kaufman and Duke Johnson	Won
Toronto Film Critics	Best Animated Film	Charlie Kaufman and Duke Johnson	Runner-up
Venice Film Festival	Grand Special Jury Prize	Charlie Kaufman and Duke Johnson	Won
Venice Film Festival	Future Film Festival Digital Award	Charlie Kaufman and Duke Johnson	Won
Venice Film Festival	Golden Lion	Charlie Kaufman and Duke Johnson	Nominated
Venice Film Festival	Green Drop Award	Charlie Kaufman and Duke Johnson	Nominated
Austin Film Critics Association Awards	Best Film		Nominated
Austin Film Critics Association Awards	Best Animated Film		Nominated
Austin Film Critics Association Awards	Top 10 Best films		4th Place
Alliance of Women Film Journalists Awards	Best Depiction of Nudity, Sexuality, or Seduction	David Thewlis and Jennifer Jason Leigh (tied with Carol)	Won
Alliance of Women Film Journalists Awards	Best Animated Film		Nominated
Village Voice Film Poll	Best Animated Film	Anomalisa	2nd Place
Village Voice Film Poll	Best Film	Anomalisa	Nominated
Village Voice Film Poll	Best Screenplay	Anomalisa	4th Place
Satellite Awards	Best Animated or Mixed Media Film		Nominated
Saturn Awards	Best Animated Film		Nominated
