= Mary Shelley's Frankenhole =

American adult stop motion-animated television series

- Genre: Adult animation; Black comedy; Comic science fiction
- Created by: Dino Stamatopoulos
- Based on: Frankenstein by Mary Shelley
- Voices of: Scott Adsit; Jeff B. Davis; Jay Johnston; Britta Phillips; Mark Rivers; Chris Shearer; Dino Stamatopoulos; Tigger Stamatopoulos; Joe Unger
- Country of origin: United States
- No. of seasons: 2
- No. of episodes: 20 (1 unaired)

Production
- Executive producers: Dino Stamatopoulos; Joe Russo II; James A. Fino; Duke Johnson; Patrick O'Neill
- Producer: Rosa Tran
- Running time: 11 minutes
- Production companies: Fragical Productions (2010); ShadowMachine (2010); Starburns Industries (2012); Williams Street

Original release
- Network: Adult Swim
- Release: June 27, 2010 – March 25, 2012

Mary Shelley's Frankenhole is an American adult stop motion-animated television series created by Dino Stamatopoulos for Cartoon Network's late night programming block Adult Swim. The series premiered on June 27, 2010, and ended on March 25, 2012, with a total of 20 episodes, over the course of 2 seasons.

== Premise ==
Dr. Victor Frankenstein has completely mastered immortality and has now also created an infinite number of Einstein–Rosen Bridges (wormholes) or "Frankenholes" between Somewhere in Eastern Europe (which is teeming with monsters and supernatural forces) and every time period from the past and the future. This allows historical figures and celebrities seeking the doctor's services to find him. Although many classic horror monsters are present, the series' main focus is Dr. Frankenstein and his family. Creator Dino Stamatopoulos says "regular human beings are the monsters."

Besides Dr. Frankenstein himself, other characters from Mary Shelley's 1818 novel Frankenstein; or, The Modern Prometheus appear.

== Characters ==
- Dr. Victor Frankenstein (voiced by Jeff B. Davis) is an immortal genius mad scientist. He "doesn't like anyone," wears a lab coat and has red hair. He is a sadomasochist (auto eroticism such as burning his crotch, shooting himself below the waist, etc.) and is opposed to the idea of regular sex, especially with his wife, who uses his fetish to her advantage by bribing him with genital mutilation. He had a troubled relationship with his father since his dying wish was to not be brought back to life. He begins work at midnight for "creditability." Since he never gave the immortality serum to his sons, they continue to age while Victor and Elizabeth stay youthful.
- Professor Sanguinaire Polidori (voiced by Scott Adsit) is the immortal assistant and partner of Victor. He is tall, has white hair and wears a lab coat. He sometimes acts as a conscience for Frankenstein, but is often quiet (playing into his supporting cast role). Often a voice of reason, "Polly Dolly" (as Frankenstein calls him) has a soft spot for the sinister. He insists they revive Frankenstein's father so they can beat him up, drinks poison, and often has a disdainful tone in his voice. Polidori has been Frankenstein's assistant for quite some time; he was already immortal when Frankenstein and Elizabeth were first married (in fact, Polidori was the one who married them). When bringing patients into Frankenstein's lab, it is said that he gives Frankenstein creepy introductions. He is based on Doctor Septimus Pretorius from Bride of Frankenstein. His name is based upon author John Polidori, a friend of Mary Shelley and Lord Byron's physician.
- Elizabeth Frankenstein (voiced by Britta Phillips) is Victor's immortal wife. She tries to act motherly but is sexually starved and is having an affair with Count Dracula, although she does this to try to make Victor jealous. She is often at odds with her husband and lover, often expressing displeasure over the little time Victor devotes to the family due to working from midnight forward. Victor secretly gave Elizabeth the immortality serum without her knowing about it when she married Victor's childhood friend Henry Clerval, and never asked to be immortal. When she did finally give into his obsessive demands to marry her, he instantly became bored. This is the reason for their faulted relationship. Her demands to have more children are ironically stymied by Victor's endeavours to create life.
- Count Dracula (voiced by Chris Shearer) is Victor's rival who is having an affair with Elizabeth, with hopes of turning her into a vampire. He often argues with Victor, usually belittling Elizabeth in the process. He is known to be politically correct during his arguments with Frankenstein. Dracula usually exits a scene turning into a bat.
- Frankenstein's "Creature" (voiced by Scott Adsit) is Victor's cynical creation and servant, who prefers to be called Creation instead of Monster. He is an alcoholic according to Victor, expressing his life and future are death, and has a big fear of fire. He at one point mentions that Frankenstein was fearful of his creation, but now has come to be annoyed by the monster. His left leg is Jewish, and can speak when detached. He is also very much infatuated with the Creation's "Bride", who was made for him. However, she has a true disdain for him, going so far as to have her hair replaced with fire to keep him away.
- Igor (voiced by Tigger Stamatopoulos) is Victor's hunch-backed assistant with a girlish, childish voice who usually briefly supplies tools during Victor's projects. Igor usually responds to his orders with "You got it".
- Blanket Jackson (voiced by Mark Rivers) is Michael Jackson's adult son, who recently bought ownership of the tavern where all the local monsters hang out.
- Heinrich Frankenstein (voiced by Mark Rivers) and Gustav Frankenstein (voiced by Scott Adsit) are the elderly, mortal sons of Victor and Elizabeth. Victor doesn't care much about them but despite this, Elizabeth tries to be motherly. In some ways, she cares more about them than Victor does. When Heinrich has been shown in his youth, he was full of joy. In his youth, it was the only time even Victor and Polidori found him adorable. But most likely over the years, both quickly grew bored of the children. Though Heinrich remains a happy child at heart, Gustav has become bitter about his mortality and hates his parents for not making him immortal, often cursing at them in German under his breath. The Grim Reaper doesn't take their lives because he wants to punish Victor and Elizabeth by letting them live (the two may have gained immortality because of Death's bitter qualities). Victor tried to murder them; however, Death refuses to take their lives even when Victor slit their throats. They are named after Heinrich Gustav Magnus, a scientist.
- Stewart Lawrence (voiced by Jay Johnston) is a suicidal man with the curse of the Werewolf as the result of a time paradox of ironically biting himself while in his transformed state. He can only be killed at the hands of someone who loves him. He's an annoyance to almost everyone as he's constantly complaining about his curse.
- Joe Yunger (voiced by Joe Unger) is a local vampire hunter who often hangs out at the tavern. Because of their mutual hatred of vampires, he and Victor have become good friends.
- The Mummy (voiced by Dino Stamatopoulos) is a wannabe comedian mummy who constantly annoys everyone with his bad jokes and one mummy pun (of being "all wrapped up") which he shoehorns into routines.
- Dr. Jekyll and Mr. Hyde (voiced by Dan Harmon) is the local pharmacist and Victor's rival mad scientist. Victor regards Jekyll's serum as idiotic as "no-one wants to become their own monster".
- Mohandas K. Gandhi (voiced by Mark Rivers) is one of the local vampires, he speaks with a stereotypical Italian accent and uses stereotypical Italian phrases and expressions. He begins a relationship with the Creation's "Bride".
- Mother Teresa (voiced by Dino Stamatopoulos) is the Frankensteins' servant.
- Vampire Trio are a group of vampires that usually show up together.
  - Nosferatu is a silent vampire who is often seen hanging out at the local tavern. He speaks in silent film title cards. He is a parody of Count Orlok from 1922's Nosferatu, and pastiche versions of Sesame Street's Count von Count and Count Chocula of breakfast cereal fame.
- Death (voiced by Dino Stamatopoulos) is the physical manifestation of Death. He goes out of his way to try and bother the immortal Dr. Frankenstein. Death takes joy out of his powers and duty, but is seen as a goof ball by anyone not subject to his power. He really just wants Dr. Frankenstein's respect. His design is inspired by Death as it appears in The Masque of the Red Death.

== Episodes ==
Season	Episodes	Originally released	
Season	Episodes	First released	Last released
1	10	August 15, 2010	June 27, 2010
2	10	January 22, 2012	March 25, 2012

=== Season 1 (2010) ===
Episodes in the first season were requested to air out of order by the series creator, Dino Stamatopolous, following the show's theme that all time takes place at once and is meaningless.

No.	Title	Directed by	Written by	Original release date	Prod. code
1	"LBJFK"	Duke Johnson & David Tuber	Dino Stamatopoulos	August 15, 2010	101
Lyndon B. Johnson asks Victor Frankenstein to put his brain into the handsome head of the recently deceased John F. Kennedy. Song: "I'm A Werewolf"
2	"Mother To Be-Sa"	Duke Johnson	Dino Stamatopoulos, Duke Johnson & Mark Rivers	Unaired	102
Mother Teresa just can't say "no" to anyone, and ends up becoming the Frankensteins' indentured servant. Guest appearance: William Salyers as The Invisible Man
3	"Attack of the Were-Lawrence"	Scott Adsit	Scott Adsit & Savelen Forrest	July 25, 2010	103
Stewart Lawrence, the Wolfman, desperately wishes to die, but can only die by the hands of a lover. Song: "Don't Blame The Moon"
4	"Heal Hitler"	David Tuber	Dino Stamatopoulos	July 18, 2010	104
Adolf Hitler wishes that Dr. Frankenstein and Dr. Polidori cure him of his antisemitism - but instead, Hitler finds himself loving the Jews. Song: "Little Daisies"
5	"Death"	Duke Johnson	Dino Stamatopoulos	July 11, 2010	105
Death comes for the mortal sons of Victor Frankenstein, after being annoyed by Frankenstein, Polidori and Elizabeth's immortality, but Victor only eggs Death on.
6	"(John) Thomas Jefferson"	David Tuber	Mark Rivers & Dino Stamatopoulos	July 4, 2010	106
Thomas Jefferson visits Dr. Frankenstein in hopes of pleasing his slaves, requesting Barack Obama's penis. Guest appearance: William Salyers as John Hancock Songs: "Never Let A Lady Think You Care", "Declaration of Mendependence"
7	"Ronny Ron Ronald"	Duke Johnson	Dino Stamatopoulos & Eric Blyler	August 1, 2010	107
Ron Howard goes back in time in and attempts to kidnap a younger version of himself to transplant his current brain into. Song: "Ronny, My Baby"
8	"Hunger of the Vampire"	David Tuber	Dino Stamatopoulos	August 8, 2010	108
Mahatma Gandhi seeks rejuvenation from Victor, but ends up being turned into a vampire.
9	"Humanitas"	Duke Johnson	Dino Stamatopoulos, Nick Weidenfeld & David Tuber	August 22, 2010	109
After Victor Frankenstein forgets his 1,000th anniversary with Elizabeth, he embarks on a time-travelling quest to prevent his past self from making Elizabeth immortal. Meanwhile, Jesus Christ stops by and asks Frankenstein and Polidori to invent socks to keep his feet warm. Guest appearance: Andy Dick as Jesus Christ Song: "Come Fly Away With Me"
10	"Yawn of the Dead"	David Tuber	Dino Stamatopoulos	June 27, 2010	110
Victor re-animates the long-dead pop idol Michael Jackson thirty years after his death to reunite with his adult son, Blanket Jackson. Doing this reawakens Victor's memories of his own father. Song: "Split Yourself in Two"

=== Season 2 (2012) ===
Season two episodes are titled in commemoration of famous writers and poets of classic science fiction.

No. overall	No. in season	Title	Directed by	Written by	Original release date	Prod. code	US viewers (millions)
11	1	"H.G. Wells' Scary Monster Contest!"	Duke Johnson	Patrick O'Neill & Dino Stamatopoulos	January 22, 2012	201	N/A
Victor enters the Creature into the Scary Monster Contest, but highly doubts that he will win.
12	2	"Robert Louis Stevenson's Belushi!"	David Tuber	Micheal J.S. Murphy	January 29, 2012	204	N/A
John Belushi drinks Dr. Jekyll's potion, which turns him into Jim Belushi. Guest appearance: David Cross as John Belushi and Jim Belushi
13	3	"H.P. Lovecraft's Vagina!"	Duke Johnson	Dino Stamatopoulos	February 5, 2012	203	N/A
Victor and Elizabeth switch roles to prove a point.
14	4	"Bram Stoker's Loudmouths!"	Doug	Patrick O'Neill	February 12, 2012	205	N/A
Tired of movie theater disruptions, Victor hatches a plan with Joe to end vampires. Guest appearance: Peter Blood as John Hancock
15	5	"Jules Verne's Monster Run Rally!"	David Tuber	Greg Cohen	February 19, 2012	202	N/A
Victor enters the Monster Rally, a road race across time, in order to impress Elizabeth.
16	6	"Victor Hugo's Identity!"	David Tuber	Greg Cohen & Patrick O'Neill	February 26, 2012	206	N/A
For his birthday, the Creature asks Victor to bring the people who make up his body back to life.
17	7	"Edgar Allan Poe's Jesus!"	Duke Johnson	Dino Stamatopoulos	March 4, 2012	209	0.982
Death asks Jesus for advice on how to kill better, but Jesus cannot stop talking about himself. Guest appearance: Andy Dick as Jesus Christ
18	8	"Franz Kafka's Jealousy!"	Duke Johnson & David Tuber	Duke Johnson & Dino Stamatopoulos	March 11, 2012	210	0.911
To prove he isn't jealous, Victor offers everyone in town with an under-average sized penis to have sex with Elizabeth. Meanwhile, the Invisible Man accidentally exposes himself to a little girl. Guest appearance: William Salyers as The Invisible Man
19	9	"Hyralius, Mutant Monster!" "Maly Sherrey's Hyralius! Mutant Monster!!"	Duke Johnson	Dino Stamatopoulos	March 18, 2012	207	0.890
Japan turns to Victor to defeat Hyralius, a Godzilla-like monster who makes lame jokes about Asian stereotypes. Guest appearance: Ken Jeong as every character
20	10	"Gaston Leroux's Je Ne Sais Quoi!"	Duke Johnson	Dino Stamatopoulos	March 25, 2012	208	0.903
After brainstorming with Dr. Jekyll, Victor creates a copy of his present self so he can witness his own greatness first-hand, but his copy sees Victor for who he really is: obnoxious, sweaty, egotistical and a phony.

== International broadcast ==
In Canada, Mary Shelley's Frankenhole previously aired on G4's Adult Digital Distraction block.

== Home media ==
Every episode, with the exception of "Mother To Be-Sa", is available for digital purchase on iTunes, Google Play, Amazon Video and Microsoft.

The show was available to stream for free on Tubi.
