= Dino Stamatopoulos =

American actor and showrunner (born 1964)

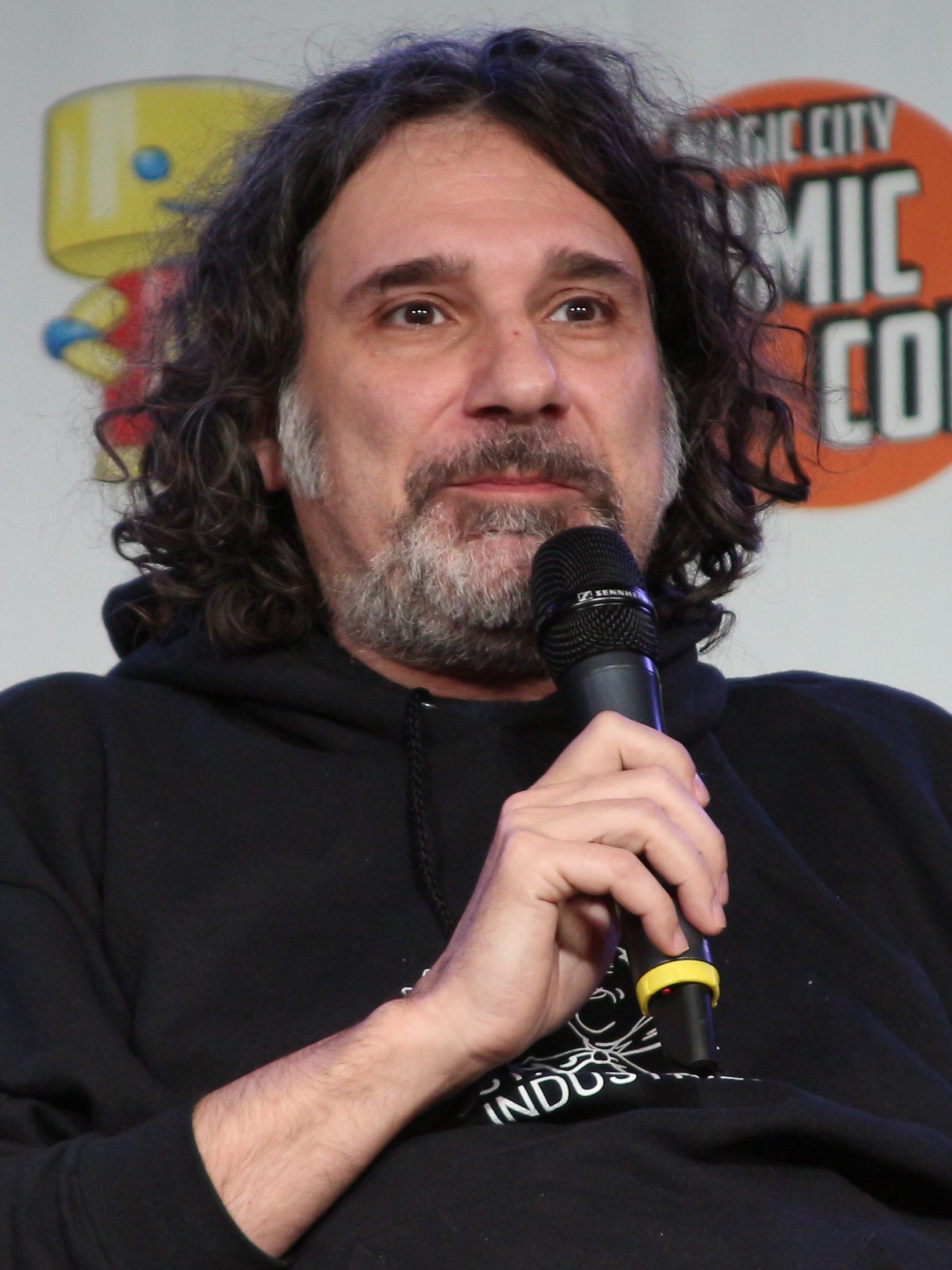
- Stamatopoulos in 2016
- Born: Konstantinos Pollux Alexandros Stamatopoulos; December 14, 1964 (age 61); Norridge, Illinois, U.S.
- Occupations: Writer, producer, actor
- Children: 1
- Writing career
- Period: 1992–present
- Genres: Satire, black comedy
- Notable works: Late Night with Conan O'Brien; The Ben Stiller Show; Mr. Show; TV Funhouse; Mad TV; Anomalisa; Moral Orel; The Drinky Crow Show; Mary Shelley's Frankenhole; High School USA! Community
- Notable awards: Emmy Awards; Outstanding Writing for a Variety or Music Program; 1993 The Ben Stiller Show

Konstantinos Pollux Alexandros "Dino" Stamatopoulos (born December 14, 1964) is an American writer, producer, and actor. He has worked on TV programs such as Mr. Show, TV Funhouse, Mad TV, The Dana Carvey Show, Late Show with David Letterman, and Late Night with Conan O'Brien, as well as the Charlie Kaufman film Anomalisa.

He has also created multiple animated TV series such as Moral Orel, Mary Shelley's Frankenhole, and High School USA!. As an actor, he is best known for his recurring role as the character Alex "Star-Burns" Osbourne on the NBC comedy series Community, on which he also worked as a producer, a consulting writer, and wrote two animated episodes.

== Early life ==
Stamatopoulos attended Ridgewood High School in Norridge, Illinois. He is of Greek descent.

== Career ==
Stamatopoulos was hired on The Ben Stiller Show after Andy Dick convinced him to submit a spec script for a Simpsons episode. There, he met and worked with Bob Odenkirk. After Stiller's show was canceled, he moved to New York City, where he wrote during the 1990s for The Dana Carvey Show, Late Night with Conan O'Brien (also with Odenkirk), Late Show with David Letterman, and Mr. Show with Bob and David.

In 2000, Stamatopoulos and Robert Smigel pitched Comedy Central a spin-off of Smigel's TV Funhouse cartoons (which were appearing singly as animated shorts on Saturday Night Live episodes) as a half-hour sketch comedy show. The standalone TV Funhouse show premiered in 2000 but was canceled after one season. He later joined the writing staff on Mad TV.

Stamatopoulos worked as a creative consultant and contributing writer on the first season of Tom Goes to the Mayor, with Tim & Eric and Bob Odenkirk. He also provided the voice of Drinky Crow on The Drinky Crow Show, which aired for one season on Adult Swim. His stop motion animated series Moral Orel premiered on Adult Swim on Christmas 2005 and aired for three seasons, airing its final episode in December 2008; a follow-up special aired in 2012. Following Moral Orel, Stamatopoulos created Mary Shelley's Frankenhole, a stop motion series, for Adult Swim. It ran for two seasons from 2010 to 2012.

Stamatopoulos was a writer, consulting writer, producer and actor on the 2009 NBC sitcom Community. He wrote two animated episodes for the series, "Abed's Uncontrollable Christmas" (2010) and "G.I. Jeff" (2014). He played the recurring role of Alex "Star-Burns" Osbourne, a character whose nickname derived from his large star-shaped sideburns. Together with Community creator Dan Harmon, Stamatopoulos started production company Starburns Industries.

A long-time fan of radio personality Steve Dahl, Stamatopoulos hosted a podcast, Sorry About Everything, from May 2012 until June 2013 on Dahl's Steve Dahl Network.

Stamatopoulos and friend Andy Dick hosted a weekly podcast, Dino and Andy's Skull Juice, which premiered in late 2016 and was initially produced by Feral Audio. Due to an on-air incident of hostility in mid-2018, Dick was asked to leave the podcast. Stamatopoulos asked friend and recurring guest Dana Snyder to replace Dick as co-host, and the podcast was renamed Dino & Dana's Safe Space. Additional co-hosts Laetitia "Tish" Burns and Spencer Crittenden were also given billing in the podcast.

== Personal life ==
Stamatopoulos was married and has one daughter. He is a vocalist and guitarist in a rock band called Sorry About Everything.

== Filmography ==
=== Film ===
Year	Title	Producer	Writer	Actor	Role	Notes
1996	Breathing Room	No	No	Yes	Jersey Rocker	Live-action feature film
2002	The Master of Disguise	Co-producer	No	No	—N/a	Live-action feature film
2014	Harmontown	Executive	No	No	—N/a	Documentary film
2015	Anomalisa	Yes	No	No	—N/a	Animated feature film

=== Television ===
Year	Title	Writer	Actor	Producer	Creator	Director	Role	Notes
1992–1993	The Ben Stiller Show	Yes (12)	Yes (1)	No	No	No	Waiter #2	Sketch comedy series
1993–1999	Late Night with Conan O'Brien	Yes (540)	Yes (2)	No	No	No	Tomorry the Ostrich; Kiss-Ass Turkey; Abe Lincoln; Various characters	Late-night talk show
1996	The Dana Carvey Show	Yes	Yes (3)	No	No	No	Guy in Nixon Mask; Wazir Brother; Gas Station Attendant	Sketch comedy series
1996–1997	Late Show with David Letterman	Yes (131)	No	No	No	No	—N/a	Late-night talk show
1996–1998	Mr. Show with Bob and David	Yes (21)	Yes (13)	Yes (10)	No	No	Various characters	Sketch comedy series; Producer for 9 episodes and consulting producer for 1 episode
1996–2006	Saturday Night Live	Yes (1)	Yes (4)	No	No	No	Michael Jackson (voice)	Sketch comedy series
2000–2001	TV Funhouse	Yes	Yes	Yes	No	No	Chickey; Mr. Whiskers; Various characters	Sketch comedy series
2002–2004	Mad TV	Yes (50)	No	No	No	No	—N/a	Sketch comedy series
2004–2005	Tom Goes to the Mayor	Yes	No	No	No	No	—N/a	Animated series; Also creative consultant
2005–2008	Moral Orel	Yes (37)	Yes	Yes	Yes	Yes (8)	Various characters	Animated series
2006	Lucky Louie	Yes (1)	No	No	No	No	—N/a	TV sitcom
2007–2009	The Drinky Crow Show	No	Yes	No	No	No	Drinky Crow, Lieutenant Vronchy	Animated series
2009	Important Things with Demetri Martin	Yes (1)	No	No	No	No	—N/a	Sketch comedy series
2009–2015	Community	Yes (2)	Yes (39)	Consulting producer (37)	No	No	Alex "Star-Burns" Osbourne	TV sitcom; Also consulting writer for 24 episodes
2010–2012	Mary Shelley's Frankenhole	Yes (9)	Yes	Yes	Yes	No	Death; The Mummy; Mother Teresa; Additional voices	Animated series
2013	High School USA!	Yes	Yes	Yes (10)	Yes	No	Mr. Merriweather	Animated series
2015	The Jack and Triumph Show	Yes (1)	No	Yes (5)	No	No	—N/a	TV sitcom
2015	W/ Bob & David	Yes (4)	Yes (1)	Co-executive producer (5)	No	No	Chuck	Sketch comedy series
2016	Horace and Pete	No	No	Co-executive producer	No	No	—N/a	Web series
2016	Great Minds with Dan Harmon	No	No	Yes (1)	No	No	—N/a	Comedy series; Also consulting producer for 10 episodes
2021	The Black Hole	Yes	Yes	Yes	Yes	No	Various roles	Unaired animated pilot
