= List of Mr. Pickles and Momma Named Me Sheriff characters =

The following is a list of characters from the series Mr. Pickles (2013–2019) and its spin-off sequel series Momma Named Me Sheriff (2019–2021)..

== Main characters ==
=== Mr. Pickles ===
Mr. Pickles (voiced by Dave Stewart in "Season 3 Finale") is the titular protagonist and the Goodman family's pet Border Collie, revealed in the Season 3 finale to be descended from a long bloodline of dogs that are physical embodiment of a Devil that ruled over an ancient island nation that previously sacrificed any living dogs. Through reasons unknown, Mr. Pickles ended up in Old Town and living with the Goodman family - named by Tommy for his love of eating pickles. He also enjoys mutilating, killing and engaging in sexual debauchery with those who pose a threat to Tommy or other antagonists. Mr. Pickles is highly intelligent and possesses incredible strength, surgical skills that he uses to mutilate his victims, the ability to steal from an evil scientist, a high-tech android, and demonic powers which allow him to control local animals to do his bidding (it is shown in one episode of Season 3 that he can't control snakes due to them having no ears to hear his demonic commands but learns to control them through vibrations). Despite his evil ways, he loves and is extremely protective of the impressionable young Tommy and his family: protecting them from danger, and often killing those who might do them harm, such as murdering a group of sexual predators or turning an unlicensed breast surgeon who gave Tommy breast implants into a multiple-breasted freak. He has a long-standing feud with Henry Gobbleblobber, the only Goodman family member aware of Mr. Pickles' evil nature. While Mr. Pickles does not actually harm Henry, the dog does put the old man in humiliating situations while making him seem crazy to everyone else. Despite their adversarial nature, Mr. Pickles has saved Henry from being lobotomized while he was committed to an asylum and a cannibalistic serial killer that Henry had befriended, unaware he was an escaped convict and serial killer. Mr. Pickles has also shown to be sexually attracted to Tommy's mother by often groping, touching her private areas, and even playfully dry-humping her.

Mr. Pickles' doghouse leads to a hidden, underground lair that's filled with blood, pentagrams, victims – both living slaves and dead, mutilated bodies – and a throne where he usually eats his pickles. Many of the series' one-time characters usually end up in his lair where they are either killed or kept as prisoners. Henry is the only person shown to be able to enter Mr. Pickles' lair and survive repeatedly as nobody believes him due to his tales. He is responsible for turning Henry's wife Agnes into Steve, which is implied to have been due to her promising to do anything he wanted her to. Mr. Pickles and Agnes work together to stop Henry from revealing the truth by having Agnes pretend she has amnesia, but their plan hits a snag when Henry takes her to a memory download service which is actually a blackmailing scam run by a group of hackers. Agnes angers Mr. Pickles when she almost blows everything while being confronted by her daughter and Henry over her failed attempt to seduce Stanley into having an affair which had been revealed by Tommy. She is killed by a passing truck but Mr. Pickles revives her and sends her on one last mission to destroy the satellite which contains a backup file of her memories. Though it is implied that Agnes became Steve because Mr. Pickles threatened to kill her, Mr. Pickles sheds a tear as he shoots Steve into space, indicating that he did come to care for her.

He also works well with Beverly when Stanley and his coworkers are kidnapped and ends up saving her, Stanley, and his coworkers from their captors showing that he is just as protective of Tommy's parents. In the Season 3 Finale, Mr. Pickles chases Henry down to his cabin after he moves away, intending to lessen his credibility further by making it seem he can talk via a speaker for one of his spare Steves to speak through. But Mr. Pickles decides to frame Henry for mass murder instead after the old man attempted to kill him, with Henry escaping the Sheriff and finding Mr. Pickles's ancestral home where he and one of Mr. Pickles's servant conduct a scheme to kill him. Though Mr. Pickles appeared to outwit and seemingly killed Henry by switching bodies with the owner of a show dog he was making love with, he ends up being killed for real as Henry used the same spell to switch bodies with Mr. Pickles's servant and then the show dog. However, the show dog gives birth to a female puppy that Tommy names "Mrs. Pickles".

=== Tommy Goodman ===
Tommy Goodman (voiced by Kaitlyn Robrock) is the Goodman family's physically disabled and dimwitted young son. He is 6-year-old, wears leg-braces and a bowl cut, and considers Mr. Pickles as his best friend, often feeding him pickles whenever he behaves. Tommy is often protected by Mr. Pickles and is protective of Mr. Pickles as well, such as when he took it upon himself to search for Mr. Pickles after he was kidnapped by mercenaries. Due to his idiocy and naïve personality, Tommy usually gets involved in dangerous situations and Mr. Pickles (at times frustrated) steps in to save him and dispose of the bad people involved. Like most characters on the show, Tommy is unaware of Mr. Pickles' evil nature. At one point in season two, Mr. Pickles spends most of the episode away from Tommy; this results in Tommy getting involved in a series of accidents, causing him to scorn Mr. Pickles and not give him a pickle. However, in Season 3's opening, he returns to his friendly nature after finding his grandmother Agnes. Agnes, however, shows contempt for Tommy, calling him a stupid boy even while pretending to be amnesiac.

=== Stanley Goodman ===
Stanley Goodman (voiced by Jay Johnston) is Tommy's father who works as a telemarketer. Stanley is constantly bullied by his boss. As a result, Stanley hardly has time to spend with his family, especially his son. Nevertheless, Stanley means well and is committed to his family. Though they don't interact much, Mr. Pickles seems to respect him to a degree. He even showed displeasure when it looked as though a doctor was about to bring Stanley harm. In the opening of Season 3, it is revealed that he once laid naked with his mother-in-law Agnes, which is revealed by Tommy when he had all the town's memories uploaded into his mind. However, Agnes reveals that he refused to have sex with her when she tried to seduce him.

In Momma Named Me Sheriff, he quits his job as a telemarketer and became deputy where he works under the Sheriff.

=== Beverly Goodman ===
Beverly Goodman (voiced by Brooke Shields) is Tommy's stay-at-home mother who is the traditional dutiful mother and wife. Beverly is oblivious of Mr. Pickles' evil nature and dismisses the dog's sexual behavior, for instance groping and touching her, as simple dog mannerisms. Like her son, Beverly is very dimwitted and naïve and sometimes feels limited by her home life. Despite being the first person to dismiss her father's stories about Mr. Pickles, she is very close to him as he is one of the few people she can talk to. Near the end of the second season, she's shown to be very tired of her domestic duties and had a strained relationship with her mother, who prevented Beverley from following her dreams. In Season 3, she returns to her normal self after Agnes is found by Tommy unaware it was to prevent her father from revealing that Agnes was Steve. She hopes to reconnect with her mother despite believing she has amnesia. When it is revealed that Agnes had lied naked next to her husband, she is angered at Stanley and her mother, though Agnes reveals in anger that Stanley refused her attempts to seduce him before she is killed by a passing truck. However Agnes' death seems to give her some closure thanks to the knowledge that Stanley chose to remain faithful to her and their marriage. She and Stanley decide to tell Tommy that his grandmother is in a better place as he is unaware of her death. In Season 3, she is shown to be more assertive and capable, even working together with Mr. Pickles to rescue her husband when he is kidnapped together with his coworkers by an insane telemarketer-hating plantation owner. She is also capable of constructing a motorcycle from household items and even fight off a motorcycle gang all by herself. However, she has a habit of damaging her husband's trunk every time she drives even when she does not drive the truck itself, as she ends up damaging it with her makeshift motorcycle after it is hit by a bowling ball thrown by the Sheriff. However, she retains her kind-hearted personality when she refuses to punish Tommy's bullies physically as she doesn't condone corporal punishment or violence against children.

=== Henry Gobbleblobber ===
Henry Gobbleblobber (voiced by Frank Collison) is Tommy's grandfather and Beverly Goodman's father, referred to by everyone as "Grandpa Goodman" (despite the fact that he is really Beverly's father, while he and Stanley are in-laws). He is the only family member aware of Mr. Pickles' evil ways and has borne witness to the dog's several murders and other depraved acts. However, most of his family and the town Sheriff dismiss his attempts to expose the dog as just another of one of his "evil Mr. Pickles stories" and sometimes the Sheriff arrests him instead. Henry views Mr. Pickles as a monster though he understands that he and Mr. Pickles both care for Tommy's safety. Henry also suffers harassment from Mr. Pickles, though he briefly got peace from the dog during his brief fear of vacuum cleaners.

At the end of Season 1 and the start of Season 2, Henry attempts to expose Mr. Pickles by video-taping the inside of Mr. Pickles' doghouse to show to the Sheriff before learning he was one of Mr. Pickles' many high-tech androids. Henry ends being committed to the Old Town asylum when he attacked the real sheriff, realizing Mr. Pickles can't touch him while learning too late that asylum's director wishes to lobotomize him. Mr. Pickles eventually manages to free Henry from the asylum, ironically saving him.

In the Season 2 finale and Season 3, Henry's attempt to find out about a strange coin associated with Mr. Pickles led to him learning that his wife Agnes, who is revealed to be Steve, is still alive and serves by Mr. Pickles' side. Henry threatens to expose them, but Mr. Pickles arranges Agnes to found while feigning amnesia, Henry takes her to a memory download service in an attempt to forcefully recover her memories before it backfired when the proprietor is revealed to be a blackmailing hacker. Following Agnes's death when she was run over by a truck after learning she lied naked with his son-in-law, Henry angrily tries to confront Mr. Pickles before finding her revived and made some peace with Agnes as she sacrifices herself to destroy the satellite containing the hacker's memory backups.

In the Season 3 finale and Season 4, Henry grows tired of Mr. Pickles' continued torment and moves out of Old Town to a mountainside cabin while promising to visit the Goodman Family. Henry expected Mr. Pickles would come after him and lays a trap for him so he can kill the dog. But Mr. Pickles tricks Henry into believing he can speak while revising his original plan of further discrediting the old man to instead frame him as a mass murderer, with Henry on the lam with Sheriff following him to Mexico. Henry takes Sheriff's gun and forces him to take him to Mr. Pickles's ancestral island home, gaining an accomplice in one of Mr. Pickles's followers as they scheme to snipe the dog. Though it seemed Mr. Pickles was step away and killed him while setting up another to take the mass murder charges, Henry swapped souls with his accomplice prior to escape his death and then transferred his soul into a show dog Mr. Pickles was making out with to kill him, finally killing and defeating the surprised Mr. Pickles for once and all, despite Henry's victory is short-lived when Miss Pickles is born.

In Momma Named Me Sheriff, Henry is shown to be annoyed by Mrs. Pickles' antics.

=== Sheriff ===
Sheriff (voiced by Will Carsola) is the unnamed sheriff of Old Town. He lives with his mother and sister. He behaves like a young boy and has a doll named Abigail, whom he often talks to and has tea parties with. He is often called upon by Henry whenever he has evidence of Mr. Pickles being evil, but Mr. Pickles usually manages to place the blame on somebody else or remove the evidence causing the Sheriff to remain skeptical to the old man's claims. Ironically, despite his dubious abilities as Old Town's sheriff, the Sheriff is often credited with the capture and arrest of individuals Mr. Pickles sets up to take the fall, contributing to the town's view that the Sheriff is a competent law enforcement official. The Sheriff himself seems to view Mr. Pickles as a good-natured dog and in season 2 even recruits Mr. Pickles as a police dog to help him track down some escaped serial killers. Mr. Pickles even saves the Sheriff from being killed by one of the escaped killers. This makes him one of the few people outside the Goodman family that actually ends up being protected by Mr. Pickles' evil actions. Because of his childlike personality, Mr. Pickles finds it easy to manipulate him, even dressing himself in human skin in Season 3 so he can engage in his daily sexual debauchery and murderous activities, then dressing a pimp in said skin suit and have him be killed by the Sheriff in order to take the fall for Mr. Pickles' activities while at the same time giving the Sheriff the perfect birthday present for his mother, her son being hailed as a hero in the paper for apparently stopping a dangerous serial killer.

After Henry finally succeeds in killing Mr. Pickles in the series finale, Sheriff gets a spin-off called Momma Named Me Sheriff where Stanley is now working for him as a deputy.

== Recurring characters ==
=== Steve ===
Steve (voiced by Barbara Goodson) is Henry's wife, Beverly's mother, and Tommy's grandmother who was originally known as Agnes Gobbleblobber. As revealed by Beverly, who bore some resentment towards her mother for cutting down her dreams of taking a career in fencing to be a housewife, Agnes was once a critical homebody. For reasons yet to be fully revealed, Agnes faked her death and became Mr. Pickles' gimp Steve. Steve lives in the caves under Mr. Pickles' doghouse as its guardian and right-hand while often taking part in Mr. Pickles' depraved activities. In the Season 2 finale and Season 3 premiere, assuming she was revived by Mr. Pickles, Henry learns about Steve's true identity as she resumed her original identity while feigning memory loss with the intention to make Henry's life more miserable. But a series of events involving her memories being downloaded exposed her having lied naked with her son-in-law. This provokes Agnes into a rant, revealing that Stanley refused to have sex with her and overstep her boundaries when she insulted Tommy while nearly exposing herself. Agnes realizes too late that she offended Mr. Pickles and she ended up being run over and killed by a truck while pleading for the dog's forgiveness. After being revived by Mr. Pickles, Agnes makes some peace with Henry while making her goodbyes to him and Mr. Pickles before sacrificing herself to destroy the satellite containing her downloaded memories. Before the satellite is destroyed, it is implied from one of her past memories that Agnes became Steve when Mr. Pickles held a knife to her throat and she pleaded for her life.

=== Floyd ===
Floyd (voiced by Dave Stewart) is colleague of Stanley Goodman who works as a telemarketer. Morbidly obese to the point that his excessive fat sags, Floyd is almost always seen eating various foods. He got his obesity from traveling to food competitions, which he won. Because of his competition fame, he is surprisingly quite wealthy and lives in a mansion with his beautiful wife. His mansion's interior designs are made mostly out of food. He also has a gym, but doesn't use it since he can't fit through the door. Despite his appetite and appearance, he seems to get along with others. Although Stanley finds him awkward to be around. In the second episode of the second season, Floyd has apparently become more obese.

=== Mr. Bojenkins ===
Mr. Bojenkins (voiced by Frank Collison in 2014–2016, Alex Désert in 2018–present) is a kindly African-American man that drives a wagon pulled by some large pit bulls. He's known to have sex with multiple women and is considered the Sheriff's best friend. Like the other adults, he makes fun of Grandpa's evil Mr. Pickles stories.

In a season 2 episode, Mr. Bojenkins took it upon himself to save the Sheriff from a woman who was the daughter of a crime boss who was held captive by Mr. Pickles since Season 1. After rescuing the Sheriff with the aid of the Sheriff's elderly mother, he ended up sleeping with her.

In Season 3, he attempts to teach the Sheriff how to be a man after noticing he is a mama's boy. He takes the Sheriff to a bar and treats him to a drink, but the Sheriff gets really drunk causing havoc in the bar. To make matters worse, Tommy finds Mr. Bojenkins' cellphone which contains the numbers of various women he has been sleeping with, revealing his womanizing ways. They confront him at the bar, revealing that he slept with the Sheriff's mother to the Sheriff who attacks him in a drunken rage. They fall into a river and are washed up to a forest ruled by ravenous wolves. The two argue but are attacked by the wolves, though the Sheriff is able to pacify them briefly with his doll Abigail, before they are dragged away. They meet the leading female of the pack who the Sheriff pacifies, though it works too well causing her to become attracted to the Sheriff who Mr. Bojenkins convinces to have sex with to save their lives, though they are forced to flee when the leading male returns. Mr. Bojenkins reconciles with the Sheriff after their adventure.

=== Linda ===
Linda (voiced by Dave Stewart), also known as "Crazy Linda", is an unattractive and deranged woman who is Beverly's best friend. Her features include a unibrow, sagging prehensile breasts, a bulging stomach, a flipper on one foot, and overgrown toenails on the other. She is known for trying to sell people, especially the Goodmans, products that are either old or broken. Linda was once married to Henry, but that was because he was drunk thanks to Mr. Pickles. She is often seen digging in trash to search for something to sell to people. It is revealed that she's actually very wealthy and lives inside a fancy house that looks like a tree, but would often give some of her money away to the homeless.

==== Linda Jr. ====
Linda Jr. is the daughter of Crazy Linda. She looks similar to her mother but is cleaner. Linda Jr. has a thumb growing out of her navel but doesn't let it bother her. She's sweet, kind and helps Tommy learn to be himself and how being different shouldn't let him stop him from doing anything he wants to do. Linda Jr. indicates that she doesn't know the identity of her father.

=== Momma ===
Momma (voiced by Sean Conroy) is the mother of Sheriff who he lives with.

=== Boss ===
Boss (voiced by Will Carsola) is Stanley's young, acne-ridden boss with a shrill, pubescent voice who uses his position at Telemarketer Inc. to bully Stanley to do undesirable and humiliating things. He acts like a brat, plays video games, and is married to a steroid muscle-building woman.

In Momma Named Me Sheriff, Stanley quit working for him prior to the spin-off. In one episode, his real name is revealed to be "Boss" and that he has been selling some dangerous items.

=== The Blorpton Brothers ===
The Bullies (voiced by Will Carsola and Dave Stewart) are two unnamed boys that make fun and tease Tommy for his condition while getting into suggestive poses that imply a homosexual attraction between them. In Season 3, it is revealed they are The Blorpton Brothers and Beverly attempt to speak to their parents after they beat up Tommy. However, their white trash parents encourage their behavior as they hate their kids and end up pawning them off to Beverly who is forced to deal with their misbehavior. Mr. Pickles almost kills them when they attack Tommy with vibrators, but Beverly interrupts his attempt to murder them to protect Tommy. Eventually, the bullies are kidnapped by a gang that rides Segways to punish them for their misbehavior, though Beverly rescues them on a motorcycle she built out of household junk and they become afraid of her after she single-handedly defeats the entire gang. Their parents try to ditch their children again, but the Sheriff causes Beverly to run over them and their boys. Mr. Pickles decides to take revenge by painting the parents' full body casts and hanging them like piñatas for the segway gang member who is celebrating his birthday.

=== Deer Hunters ===
The Deer Hunters (voiced by Will Carsola and Dave Stewart) are two unnamed deer hunters.

=== Blade ===
Blade is a handicapped computer hacker who Mr. Bojenkins seeks the aid of in Season 2 to help save the Sheriff from his new girlfriend who is actually the daughter of a crime boss. He loves raw bass and tends to offer it to anyone who visits him resulting in his catchphrase "Fish?", though his grandmother hates that her house is full of stinking fish. In Season 3, Tommy seeks his help when a group of hackers running a memory upload service blackmail the town and seeks his help in stopping them, which results in the memories being downloaded into Tommy's brain, forcing Mr. Pickles to kill the hacker's leader and revive him to save Tommy and prevent Steve's memories from being revealed.

== Other characters ==
=== Mayor of Old Town ===
The Mayor of Old Town (voiced by John Ennis) appears in the season 2 episode Mental Asylum. Mr. Pickles accidentally kills the Mayor when he is with a prostitute, during one of Mr. Pickles' senseless acts of murder. Mr. Pickles later poses as the Mayor by using the Mayor's skin as a suit in order to free Grandpa Goodman from the asylum. Mr. Pickles makes the Mayor appear crazy at a town hall meeting by humping a female dog, allowing himself to be committed, which allows Mr. Pickles to get inside in order to free Grandpa.

In Momma Named Me Sheriff, the unnamed Mayor was succeeded by an unnamed female mayor.

==== Mayor's Wife ====
The Mayor's Wife (voiced by Kaitlyn Robrock) is a pompous woman who likes to flaunt her husband's status in front of others like Beverly Goodman, (saying "My husband, the Mayor"). She is unaware of her husband's unfaithfulness and was unable to tell Mr. Pickles was posing as her husband. She is horrified and publicly disgraced when the Mayor – actually Mr. Pickles – humps her pet dog during a town meeting.

=== Warden ===
The Warden (voiced by Will Carsola) runs the mental asylum Grandpa is wrongfully taken to. He is known to laugh maniacally in between sentences and deeply desires to lobotomize his patients. He issues a proposal to the Mayor to make lobotomies legal. Mr. Pickles, posing as the Mayor, approves his proposal before he is caught having sex with a dog and is promptly sent to the asylum. The Warden then prepares him for a lobotomy, but Mr. Pickles bursts from his body at the last minute and kidnaps the Warden. The Warden is then taken to Mr. Pickles' lair where he is given a lobotomy by one of the asylum patients (now mutated into a frog after identifying as one). The Warden is seen in the next episode living as a prisoner in Mr. Pickles' lair alive, but clearly different from his lobotomy.

=== Ron Bolton ===
Ron Bolton (voiced by Will Carsola) is a successful lawyer that Grandpa hires in Grandpa's Night Out to help him claim infidelity to divorce Linda by hiring several undercover seducers, all of which Mr. Pickles disposes of by either killing or imprisoning them. As a last resort, Ron hires a hitman to kill Linda. Mr. Pickles kills the hitman and frames Ron for the murders of the hitman and the seducers.

=== Baby Man ===
Baby Man (voiced by Will Carsola) is an adult baby who appears in the first episode when Grandpa is taken to one of Mr. Pickles' fetish parties where the dog proceeds to kill and dismember the party-goers (excluding the Baby Man). Mr. Pickles later fuses him with the body parts of the other fetishists (both dead and alive). Despite this, the Baby Man's playful attitude still remains, although is often found aggressively demanding milk, and appears from time to time in Mr. Pickles' lair.

=== Frog Man ===
Frog Man is a former patient at Old Town Mental Asylum. He is first seen admitting himself into the asylum, claiming that he thinks he's a tomato. When he's in the asylum, he sees an episode of Astronaut Dolphin Detective and then identifies himself as a frog. Mr. Pickles later kidnaps him after threatening the Warden to release Grandpa. Using various dead body parts, Mr. Pickles sews the man into a giant frog-like body with little drills for fingers. The Frog Man is then used to perform a lobotomy on the Warden.

=== Doc Walton ===
Doc Walton (voiced by John Ennis) is a cross-eyed plastic surgeon who offers numerous cosmetic procedures (advertised as "jobs") from within his horse-driven wagon. Tommy confuses his "jobs" as employment and is given a breast enlargement as a result. Doc Walton is later kidnapped by Mr. Pickles and taken to his lair where he is given a set of six large breasts. He is seen in the background of the second season inside Mr. Pickles' lair.

=== Bigfoot ===
Bigfoot (voiced by Sean Conroy) is a former criminal named Vito Pizzarelli who was one of the mob's most feared hitmen before he was caught by the police. They forced Vito to rat out the entire Gabagoolie criminal organization and he was then placed under different surgeries to portray the eponymous legendary figure by the witness protection program. Tommy and Mr. Pickles encounter Bigfoot in the woods and he agrees to help bake a new Father's Day pie after he ate the previous one. Mr. Pickles also helps Bigfoot by killing the Gabagoolie criminal organization members who wished to exact their revenge when they discovered his identity after he was caught in the grocery store picking up ingredients.

Bigfoot reappears in season two, now married to a doe (dubbed his "dear wife") who gave birth to his son, Dear Boy, a deer-human hybrid. Bigfoot gets Tommy to look after his son while he spends some alone time with his wife. Unfortunately, his wife is killed by some hunters. Bigfoot claims that in his past he would have sought revenge, but his fatherhood has now changed him. Bigfoot mourns the loss of his wife at a campfire where he is confronted by the hunter who killed his wife. Mr. Pickles saves him by killing the hunter, and Bigfoot then asks him to look after his Dear Boy again while he spends time with his new lover, an owl.

=== The Cannibal ===
The Cannibal is a convicted serial killer and cannibal who is the main antagonist in the episode Serial Killers. He is considered too strange for "normal" serial killers and is prone to making cannibal-themed puns while licking his lips. He escaped police custody when he broke out of his cuffs inside the police car before eating Rape-and-Kill Ronny. The prison bus then crashed and released the remaining criminals Ugly Face, Strangler, and Poison during the road collision in the series opening. The Cannibal befriends Grandpa with the intent of feeding on him and soon gets invited to have dinner with his family. The Sheriff mistakes the Cannibal for a gum thief when he misconstrues his puns and joins the dinner in preparation to arrest him while the Cannibal plans to kill everyone. However, Mr. Pickles replaces his shiv with a stolen packet of gum and the Cannibal is then arrested for stealing gum alongside the actual gum thief who was mistaken for the cannibal. The Cannibal once again escapes custody, but is ritually killed by Mr. Pickles who removes his heart before playing with it.

=== Ugly Face ===
Ugly Face (voiced by Jay Johnston) is a serial killer who escaped during a prison bus crash. He tried to use an axe on a jogger where he became an idea love interest for Linda. This caused Ugly Face to run and later get impaled on a wooden stake by Mr. Pickles.

=== Strangler ===
Strangler is a serial killer with oversized hands who escaped during a prison bus crash. He attempted to strangle the Sheriff to death only to be killed by Mr. Pickles who ripped out his throat.

=== Poison ===
Poison (voiced by Vivica A. Fox) is a serial killer who specializes in poisoning anyone. Due to a prison bus crash, she is among the criminals that escape. Poison tried to seduce Mr. Bojenkins and poison him only for her head to be twisted 180 degrees by Mr. Pickles.

=== Superhero Guy ===
Superhero Guy (voiced by Will Carsola) is an ex-superhero whose superhero career was destroyed when his true identity of Phil Robertson was revealed by a baby pulling his mask off after he rescued a bunch of babies from a burning nursery that Crime Man blew up. This resulted in people calling him to do mundane tasks which led him to become addicted to shövenpucker: the act of shoving super sour candy balls up his anus to get high. When the candy was banned, Superhero Guy started buying them from back-alley dealers and stealing steel to sell after he became bankrupt to feed his addiction. After Superhero Guy stole Tommy's leg braces, Tommy and Sidekick Boy attempt to help him by luring the now-elderly Superhero Guy into a rehab center using a piece of steel. Superhero Guy then stole the key to his secret base in hopes of selling the steel robot suit, but ended up using the suit to steal cars and a bridge to sell as metal. When Superhero Guy goes to the recycling plant, Mr. Pickles forces him into a large compactor but refrains from killing him when he notices Tommy's braces are inside, too. Superhero Guy then escapes, but ends up having his body fused into Crime Man's vehicle that Mr. Pickles rides in the night.

==== Sidekick Boy ====
'Sidekick Boy (voiced by Tom Kenny) is the sidekick of Superhero Guy. When Superhero Guy became addicted to shövenpucker after his identity was exposed, Sidekick Guy had to change the locks on their lair. Tommy later enlisted Sidekick Boy in an attempt to get him into a rehab. After Mr. Pickles fuses Superhero Guy to Crime Man's car and drives off into the night, Sidekick Boy advises Tommy not to reveal his secret identity if he ever becomes a superhero.

=== Crime Man ===
Crime Man (voiced by Bob Bergen) is a supervillain that terrorizes Old Town. He was responsible for blowing up the nursery which led to events that led to Superhero Guy accidentally getting unmasked.

In the present, Crime Man is still causing trouble. He is later killed by Mr. Pickles and his car is fused to Superhero Guy.

=== Dear Boy ===
Dear Boy (voiced by Will Carsola) is Bigfoot's son who resembles a talking deer with a human-like head, hands, and feet. Dear Boy is put under Tommy's protection when he wants to prove that he can be responsible, but Dear Boy's uncontrollable nature causes them to have a run-in with a couple of hunters. Dear Boy then has his foot caught in a bear trap and begs Tommy to euthanize him with a gun. However, his father soon rescues him just after his mother is killed. Due to him being part-human, Dear Boy is immune to Mr. Pickles' mind-controlling powers.

=== Jon Gabagooli ===
Jon Gabagooli (voiced by Frank Vincent) is the boss of the Gabagooli criminal family. He attempted to kill Vito Pizzarelli (now "Bigfoot") when he was sighted at a grocery store. After Mr. Pickles killed the other Gabagoolies, Jon was imprisoned in Mr. Pickles' lair and was made to help break into the grocery store to steal jumbo pickles.

Jon managed to escape in season two, but was arrested by the Sheriff when he was caught trying to steal a car. Jon's daughter, Lisa Gabagoolie, frees him from jail by seducing the Sheriff and stealing his keys. Under the false belief that the Sheriff had sex with her, Jon attempts to kill him until Mr. Bojenkins and the sheriff's mother come to the rescue. Jon and his daughter escape the town in a car where they're confronted by what appears to be Mr. Pickles. Jon runs him over out of revenge, but discovers that it was actually a cardboard cut-out before the real Mr. Pickles rips his face off and shoots him in the mouth.

==== Lisa Gabagoolie ====
Lisa Gabagoolie (voiced by Carrie Keranen) is the daughter of Jon Gabagoolie. She seduces the Sheriff as part of her plan to free her father from jail. When the two of them try to escape the town in a car, they are attacked by Mr. Pickles. After her father is killed by Mr. Pickles, Lisa runs from him leaving her fate unknown.

=== Vegan Leader ===
Vegan Leader (voiced by Rob Zombie) is the leader of a quasi-religious group of vegans. He resembles a priest with a large beard that is constantly stroked by a pair of beautiful women. His body is covered in tattoos of vegan slogans and vegetables, and his genitals have been completely removed. Beverly is invited to his headquarters and greatly upsets him with her misunderstanding of veganism (she believes one can both eat animal products and be vegan at the same time). He attempts to convert her to veganism by showing her a fake slaughterhouse video and locking her in a cage like an animal. Fearing that Beverly's influence will corrupt the other vegans, he decides to perform an ancient vegan ceremony from "hundreds and hundreds of months ago". He tied Beverly to a large V while blindfolded so that they can beat the 'ignorance' out of her with hammers. Beverly is saved when a non-vegan pizza she delivered earlier arrives which causes the other vegans to give in. Mr. Pickles then arrives and kills the other vegans before they can taste the pizza and then kills the leader by impaling his skull with a giant carrot.

=== Bobby ===
Bobby (voiced by Dave Stewart) is criminal suffering from dwarfism who pretends to be a child that Tommy befriends in Season 2. He dislikes being called a midget and often corrects people by telling them that the correct term is "Little Person". Though he ends up tricking Tommy into robbing a bank, he himself is later betrayed by his girlfriend Mary and caught by the Sheriff. He has an antagonistic relationship with the Sheriff and harasses him on the Sheriff's mother's birthday in Season 3.

==== Mary ====
Mary (voiced by Pamela Adlon) is the tall girlfriend of Bobby. When Bobby tricked Tommy into robbing a bank, Mary betrayed him enough for Bobby to be caught by the Sheriff. Mr. Pickles later catches her and imprisons her in his lair. When she asks the Warden and Baby Man to get her out, the Warden asks for a Bloody Mary as Mr. Pickles cuts off her scalp.

=== Principal Garcia ===
Principal Garcia is the principal of Old Town Elementary School, he is massively muscled, heavily-tattooed, and maintains a strict "no dogs" rule at the school, at first earning Mr. Pickles' ire. However, when spying on him intent on revenge, he learns Garcia was an ex-gang member, and is now earnestly focused on providing a good education and bright future to all his students, making Mr. Pickles decide to save him when his members of his former gang arrive to blackmail Garcia.
