= Brooke Shields filmography =

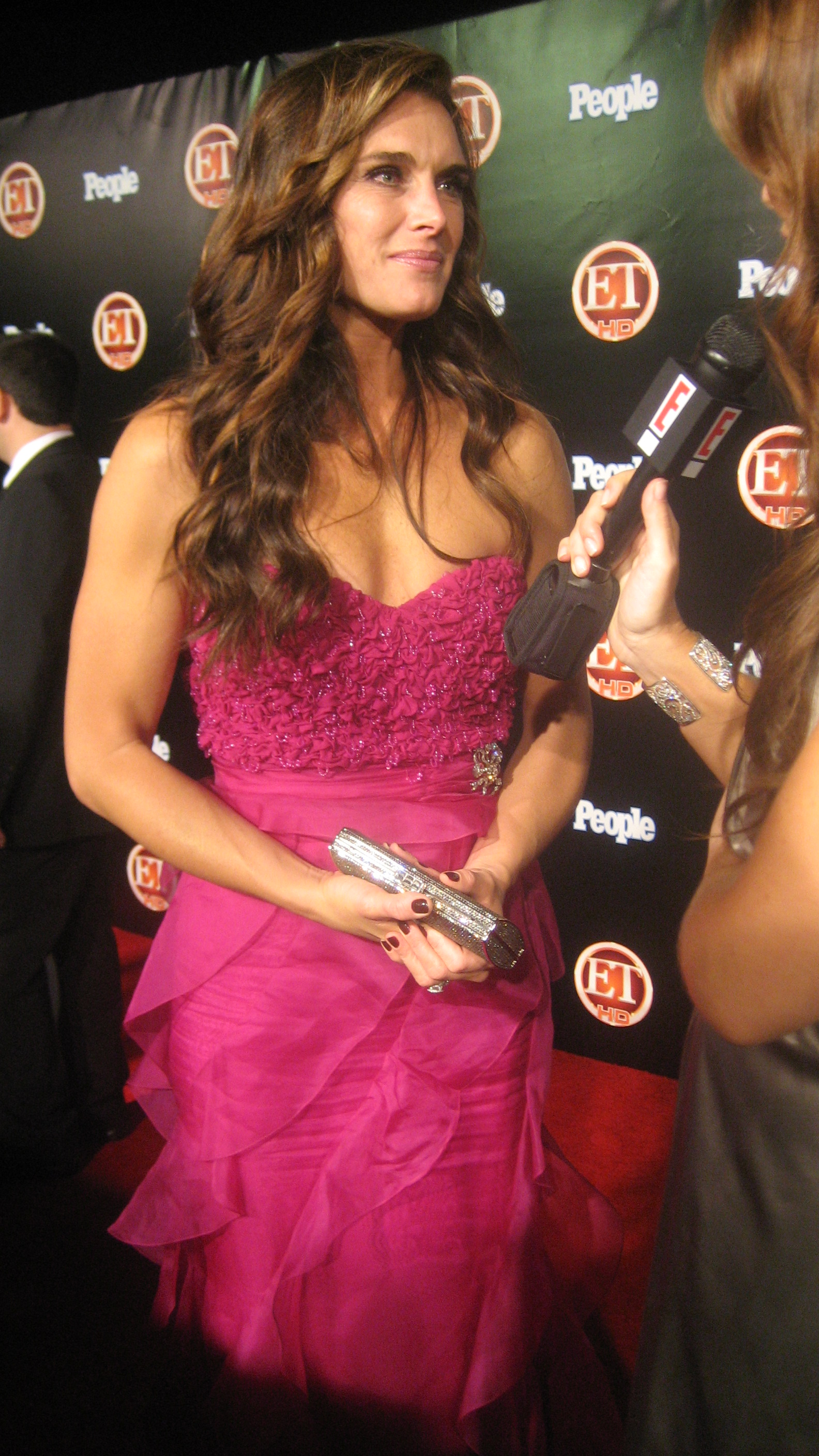
Shields in 2008

American actress Brooke Shields started her career as a child model and gained critical acclaim at age 12 for her leading role in Louis Malle's film Pretty Baby (1978). She continued to model into her late teenage years and starred in several dramas in the 1980s, including The Blue Lagoon (1980) and Franco Zeffirelli's Endless Love (1981).

In the 1990s, Shields appeared in minor roles in films. She also starred in the NBC sitcoms Suddenly Susan (1996–2000), for which she received two Golden Globe nominations, and Lipstick Jungle (2008–2009). In 2017, Shields returned to NBC with a major recurring role in Law & Order: Special Victims Unit in the show's 19th season. Shields voiced Beverly Goodman in the Adult Swim animated series Mr. Pickles (2014–2019) and its spin-off Momma Named Me Sheriff.

== Film ==
| Year | Title | Role | Notes |
|---|---|---|---|
| 1976 | Alice, Sweet Alice | Karen Spages | |
| 1977 | Annie Hall | Student | Scenes deleted |
| 1978 | Pretty Baby | Violet | |
| 1978 | King of the Gypsies | Tita Stepanowicz | |
| 1979 | Tilt | Tilt Davenport | |
| 1979 | An Almost Perfect Affair | Herself | Uncredited |
| 1979 | Wanda Nevada | Wanda Nevada | |
| 1979 | Just You and Me, Kid | Kate | |
| 1980 | The Blue Lagoon | Emmeline Lestrange | |
| 1981 | Endless Love | Jade Butterfield | |
| 1983 | Sahara | Dale Gordon | |
| 1984 | The Muppets Take Manhattan | Customer | |
| 1989 | Speed Zone | Stewardess | |
| 1989 | Brenda Starr | Brenda Starr | |
| 1990 | Backstreet Dreams | Stevie | |
| 1993 | Freaked | Skye Daley | |
| 1994 | An American Love | Greta Berling | In Italian |
| 1994 | The Postgraduate | Fantasy Wife | Short student film |
| 1995 | Running Wild | Christine Shaye | |
| 1996 | Freeway | Mimi Wolverton | |
| 1998 | The Misadventures of Margaret | Lily | |
| 1999 | The Weekend | Nina | |
| 1999 | Black and White | Sam Donager | |
| 1999 | The Bachelor | Buckley Hale-Windsor | |
| 1999 | The Disenchanted Forest | Narrator | Documentary |
| 2000 | After Sex | Kate | |
| 2004 | Our Italian Husband | Charlene Taylor | Partially in Italian |
| 2004 | The Easter Egg Adventure | Horrible Harriet Hare | Voice |
| 2005 | Bob the Butler | Anne Jamieson | |
| 2007 | National Lampoon's Bag Boy | Mrs. Hart | |
| 2008 | Justice League: The New Frontier | Carol Ferris | Voice |
| 2008 | The Midnight Meat Train | Susan Hoff | |
| 2008 | Unstable Fables: Goldilocks and the 3 Bears Show | Ruby Bear | Voice |
| 2009 | Hannah Montana: The Movie | Susan Stewart | Uncredited |
| 2010 | Furry Vengeance | Tammy Sanders | |
| 2010 | The Other Guys | Herself | |
| 2011 | Chalet Girl | Caroline | |
| 2011 | The Greening of Whitney Brown | Joan Brown | |
| 2013 | The Hot Flashes | Beth Humphrey | |
| 2013 | A Monsterous Holiday | Betsy | Voice |
| 2014 | Under Wraps | Jean | Voice |
| 2014 | Adventure Planet | Shamaness | Voice, English version |
| 2017 | Daisy Winters | Sandy Winters | |
| 2017 | When the Bough Breaks | Herself, narrator | |
| 2020 | My Boyfriend's Meds | Alicia | Mostly in Spanish |
| 2021 | All Underdogs Go to Heaven | Mrs. McBean | |
| 2021 | A Castle for Christmas | Sophie Brown | |
| 2022 | Holiday Harmony | Van | |
| 2023 | Thriller 40 | Herself | Documentary |
| 2024 | Mother of the Bride | Lana Winslow | |
| 2024 | Gracie & Pedro: Pets to the Rescue | Willow | Voice |
| 2025 | Out of Order | Daniella | |
| 2026 | Quarter | Dr. Wright | Post-production |

== Television ==
| Year | Title | Role | Notes |
|---|---|---|---|
| 1974 | After the Fall | Quentin's Daughter | Television film |
| 1977 | The Prince of Central Park | Kristin | Television film |
| 1979 | Doug Henning's World of Magic | Herself | Television special |
| 1979 | Leif | Herself | Television special |
| 1980 | The Muppet Show | Herself | Episode: "Brooke Shields" |
| 1982 | The Doctors | Elizabeth Harrington | Unknown episodes |
| 1984 | Wet Gold | Laura | Television film |
| 1984 | Blondes vs. Brunettes | Herself | Television special |
| 1988 | The Diamond Trap | Tara Holden | Television film |
| 1991 | Voices That Care | Herself | Television film |
| 1991 | Bob Hope's Yellow Ribbon Celebration | Herself | Television special |
| 1992 | Quantum Leap | Vanessa Foster | Episode: "Leaping of the Shrew" |
| 1992 | High Rock | Herself | In Greek; 1 episode |
| 1993 | I Can Make You Love Me | Laura Black | Television film |
| 1993 | The Simpsons | Herself | Voice, episode: "The Front" |
| 1993 | Tales from the Crypt | Norma | Episode: "Came the Dawn" |
| 1993 | The Roots of Roe | Pomfret Witness | Voice, television special |
| 1994 | Seventh Floor | Kate Fletcher | Australian television film |
| 1995 | Nothing Lasts Forever | Dr. Beth Taft | Miniseries |
| 1996 | Friends | Erika Ford | Episode: "The One After the Superbowl" |
| 1996–2000 | Suddenly Susan | Susan Keane | 93 episodes, producer |
| 1997 | The Larry Sanders Show | Herself | Episode: "The Book" |
| 1998 | The Almost Perfect Bank Robbery | Cyndee Lafrance | Television film |
| 2001 | What Makes a Family | Janine Nielssen | Television film |
| 2001 | Just Shoot Me! | Erlene Noodleman | Episode: "Erlene and Boo" |
| 2002 | Widows | Shirley Heller | Miniseries |
| 2003 | Miss Spider's Sunny Patch Kids | Miss Spider | Voice, television film |
| 2003 | Gary the Rat | Cassandra Harrison | Voice, episode: "Future Ex-Wife" |
| 2003 | Regarding Ardy | self, also writer and directer | Television pilot |
| 2003 | Michael Jackson's Private Home Movies | Herself | |
| 2004 | Gone, But Not Forgotten | Betsy Tannenbaum | Miniseries |
| 2004 | I'm with Her | Ivy Tyler | Episode: "Poison Ivy" |
| 2004 | That '70s Show | Pamela Burkhart | 7 episodes |
| 2005 | New Car Smell | April | Television pilot |
| 2005 | Entourage | Herself | Episode: "Blue Balls Lagoon" |
| 2006 | Law & Order: Criminal Intent | Kelly Sloane-Raines | Episode: "Siren Call" |
| 2006 | Nip/Tuck | Faith Wolper | 3 episodes |
| 2007 | Two and a Half Men | Danielle Stewert | Episode: "That's Summer Sausage, Not Salami" |
| 2007 | The Batman | Julie | Voice, episode: "Riddler's Revenge" |
| 2007–2009 | Hannah Montana | Susan Stewart | 3 episodes |
| 2008–2009 | Lipstick Jungle | Wendy Healy | 20 episodes |
| 2010 | Funny or Die Presents | Sleeping Celebrity | Episode: "1.3" |
| 2010 | Who Do You Think You Are? | Herself | Episode: "Brooke Shields" |
| 2010 | The Boy Who Cried Werewolf | Madame Olga Varcolac | Television film |
| 2010–2018 | The Middle | Rita Glossner | 6 episodes |
| 2013 | Army Wives | Col. Kat Young | 5 episodes |
| 2013 | Wonder Pets! | Witch | Voice, episode: "In the Land of Oz" |
| 2013 | Super Fun Night | Alison Lockridge | Episode: "Go with Glorg" |
| 2013–2019 | Mr. Pickles | Beverly Goodman | Voice, 28 episodes |
| 2014 | The Michael J. Fox Show | Deborah | 2 episodes |
| 2014–2018 | Creative Galaxy | Seraphina | Voice, 11 episodes |
| 2016 | Flower Shop Mystery: Mum's The Word | Abby Knight | Television film |
| 2016; 2026 | When Calls the Heart | Charlotte Thornton | 5 Episodes |
| 2016 | Flower Shop Mystery: Snipped in the Bud | Abby Knight | Television film |
| 2016 | Flower Shop Mystery: Dearly Depotted | Abby Knight | Television film |
| 2016 | Scream Queens | Dr. Scarlett Lovin | Episode: "Lovin the D" |
| 2017 | Michael Bolton's Big, Sexy Valentine's Day Special | Herself | Variety special |
| 2017 | Nightcap | Herself | Episode: "What Would Staci Do?" |
| 2017–2018 | Law & Order: Special Victims Unit | Sheila Porter | 5 episodes |
| 2018 | Murphy Brown | Holly Mackin Lynne | Episode: "The Coma and the Oxford Comma" |
| 2018–2019 | Jane the Virgin | River Fields | 14 episodes |
| 2019–2021 | Momma Named Me Sheriff | Beverly Goodman | Voice, 8 episodes |
| 2020 | 9-1-1 | Dr. Kara Sandford | Episode: "What's Next?" |
| 2021 | Martha Gets Down and Dirty | Herself | Episode: "Martha Vegs Out" |
| 2022 | Impractical Jokers | Herself | 3 episodes |
| 2022 | Would I Lie to You? | Herself | Episode: "Babysitting Lemurs" |
| 2023 | Pretty Baby: Brooke Shields | Herself | Documentary |
| 2025 | All's Fair | Julianna Morse | Episode: "This Is Me Trying" |
| 2026 | You're Killing Me | Allison Chandler | 6 episodes |

== Stage ==
| Year | Title | Role | Venue |
|---|---|---|---|
| 1986 | The Eden Cinema | Suzanne | Lucille Lortel Theatre, Off-Broadway |
| 1994–1995 | Grease | Betty Rizzo | Eugene O'Neill Theatre, Broadway |
| 2000 | The Vagina Monologues | Performer | Westside Theatre, Off-Broadway |
| 2001 | Cabaret | Sally Bowles | Studio 54, Broadway |
| 2002 | The Exonerated | Sunny Jacobs | 45 Bleecker Theater, Off-Broadway |
| 2004–2005 | Wonderful Town | Ruth Sherwood | Al Hirschfeld Theatre, Broadway |
| 2005 | Chicago | Roxie Hart | Adelphi Theatre, West End |
| 2005 | Chicago | Roxie Hart | Richard Rodgers Theatre, Broadway |
| 2010 | Love, Loss and What I Wore | Performer | Westside Theatre, Off-Broadway |
| 2010 | Leap of Faith | Marla MacGowan | Ahmanson Theatre, Los Angeles |
| 2011 | Girls Talk | Lori Rosen | Lee Strasberg Theatre, Los Angeles |
| 2011 | The Vagina Monologues | Performer | John Drew Theater, East Hampton |
| 2011 | The Addams Family | Morticia Addams | Lunt-Fontanne Theatre, Broadway |
| 2012 | The Sound of Music | Elsa Schrader | Carnegie Hall |
| 2012 | The Exorcist | Chris MacNeil | Geffen Playhouse, Los Angeles |
| 2012 | The Exonerated | Sunny Jacobs | Bleecker Street Theater, Off-Broadway |
| 2023 | Love Letters | Melissa Gardner | Irish Repertory Theatre, Off-Broadway |
| 2023 | Gutenberg! The Musical! | Producer | James Earl Jones Theatre, Broadway |
