= Frank Collison =

American actor (born 1950)

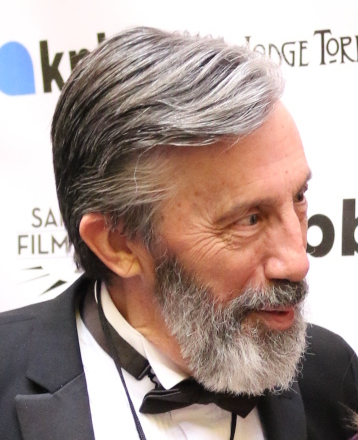
- Collison in 2019
- Born: February 14, 1950 (age 76); Evanston, Illinois, U.S.
- Occupation: Actor
- Spouse: Laura Gardner
- Children: 3

Frank Collison (born February 14, 1950) is an American actor known to television audiences as the hapless telegrapher Horace Bing in the series Dr. Quinn, Medicine Woman and Grandpa Goodman in Mr. Pickles.

== Early life ==
Collison was born in Evanston, Illinois, the son of Peg, a publicist, director, and English teacher, and John Collison, a speech therapist, actor, and writer. Collison played his first role as a six-month-old mascot at The Tent Theatre in Granville, Ohio. His mother directed him in a number of plays as a youth in Virginia and Ohio. When he was a young boy, he assisted his father touring with his one-man Abraham Lincoln show. His father was chosen to play Lincoln for the centennial celebration of Lincoln's first inauguration in Washington, DC; Frank played the young Tad Lincoln.

== Career ==
=== Stage ===
Collison trained at the American Conservatory Theater in San Francisco, earning a BA in theatre from the San Francisco State University. He then helped to establish a summer theatre company in the Sierra Nevada, and went on to gain an MFA in acting at University of California, San Diego. Between acting jobs he has worked as a substitute teacher, diaper service dispatcher and forest firefighter. Appearing in over 150 productions, he has worked off Broadway and in regional theatres in California, Boston, and Denver. His theatrical roles have been as varied as "Jacob Marley" in A Christmas Carol to "Miss Havisham" in Great Expectations to "Puck" in A Midsummer Night's Dream. Collison is a founding member of the Pacific Resident Theatre in Venice, California, which has won over 25 Los Angeles Drama Critics Circle Awards.

=== Film ===
Collison's films include The Blob, Elvira, Mistress of the Dark, Alien Nation, Wild at Heart, Mobsters, The Last Boy Scout, Buddy, Diggstown, My Summer Story, O Brother, Where Art Thou?, The Majestic, The Whole Ten Yards, Hidalgo, Hope Springs, The Village, Suspect Zero, The Happening, Radio Free Albemuth, Hesher, Hitchcock and L.A. Slasher.

=== Television ===
Collison is best known to TV audiences as Horace Bing, the bumbling telegraph operator, on CBS's long-running series Dr. Quinn, Medicine Woman. His numerous other television appearances have included guest-starring roles on Monk, HBO's Carnivàle, Star Trek: The Next Generation, My Name is Earl, Criminal Minds, Seventh Heaven, Matlock, NYPD Blue, Hill Street Blues, Stargate Atlantis and Good Luck Charlie. In 2016 he appeared in the sixth season of the anthological series American Horror Story (Roanoke).

He is a main voice actor by voicing Grandpa Goodman and Mr. Bojenkins in the Adult Swim original Mr. Pickles where later seasons has Mr. Bojenkins recast to Alex Désert. Collison reprised Grandpa Goodman in the spin-off Momma Named Me Sheriff.

In 2023, Collison guest starred in The Loud House episode "Leave No Van Behind" where voices Vanzilla's creator Freddy Fungo.

== Personal life ==
Collison lives in Los Angeles with his wife, actress Laura Gardner, and their three children. He remains active in theatre while pursuing a film career.

== Filmography ==
- 1988 The Blob - cinema projectionist
- 1991 The Last Boy Scout - as thug man pablo
- 1991 Dollman - Sprug
- 2000 O Brother, Where Art Thou? - Wash Hogwollop
- 2001 The Majestic - Subpoena server
- 2003 Hope Springs - Fisher
- 2004 The Village - Victor
- 2008 The Happening - Hot Dog Guy
