= Interrupter (disambiguation) =

An interrupter is a device used to interrupt the flow of a steady direct electrical current.

Interrupter or Interrupters may also refer to:

- Interrupter gear, gear for interrupting the fire of a machine gun on an airplane to enable it to fire through a spinning propeller
- USS Interrupter, a Guardian-class radar picket ship renamed USS Tracer
- The Interrupter, a character portrayed by American comedian Brian Stack
- The Interrupters (film), a 2011 documentary film
- The Interrupters (band), an American ska punk band

== See also ==
- Interruption (disambiguation)
