= List of Mr. Pickles episodes =

Mr. Pickles is an American animated sitcom, which aired from September 21, 2014 to November 18, 2019, on Cartoon Network's late-night programming block Adult Swim. The series revolves around the Goodman family and their demonic dog Mr. Pickles.

== Series overview ==
Season	Episodes	Originally released	
Season	Episodes	First released	Last released
Pilot		August 25, 2013	
1	10	September 21, 2014	November 23, 2014
2	10	April 17, 2016	June 26, 2016
3	10	February 26, 2018	March 26, 2018
4	1	November 18, 2019	

== Episodes ==
=== Pilot (2013) ===
No. overall	No. in season	Title	Directed by	Written by	Original release date
1	1	"Pilot"	Will Carsola	Will Carsola & Dave Stewart	August 25, 2013
Tommy and Mr. Pickles join the Scouts to find the Great Outdoors and the DonkeyBird, while Grandpa tries to prove that Mr. Pickles is responsible for an exotic dancer's death.

=== Season 1 (2014) ===
No. overall	No. in season	Title	Directed by	Written by	Original release date	Prod. code	US viewers (millions)
2	1	"Tommy's Big Job"	Will Carsola	Will Carsola & Dave Stewart and Sean Conroy	September 21, 2014	102	1.43
Tommy sets out for a job when he falls for a young farmer girl.
3	2	"Father's Day Pie"	Will Carsola	Will Carsola & Dave Stewart and Sean Conroy	September 28, 2014	101	1.70
Tommy hunts for the missing Father's Day pie, but encounters Bigfoot instead who is actually a man named Vito Pizzarelli who is in this form as part of a witness protection program.
4	3	"Foul Ball"	Will Carsola	Will Carsola & Dave Stewart and Sean Conroy	October 5, 2014	104	1.47
The Goodmans go to a baseball game and Tommy hopes to catch a highly sought-after, record-breaking foul ball.
5	4	"The Cheeseman"	Will Carsola	Will Carsola & Dave Stewart and Sean Conroy	October 12, 2014	107	1.64
The Goodmans go on a family camping trip and Tommy learns the frightening legend of The Cheeseman.
6	5	"Dead Man's Curve"	Will Carsola	Will Carsola & Dave Stewart and Sean Conroy	October 19, 2014	105	1.39
Tommy enters the soapbox derby and Grandpa finds Mr. Pickles' biggest fear.
7	6	"Loose Tooth"	Will Carsola	Will Carsola & Dave Stewart and Sean Conroy	October 26, 2014	106	1.27
Tommy sets out with Mr. Pickles to lose his tooth so he can meet the Tooth fairy. Meanwhile, the Sheriff searches for a group of wanted pedophiles.
8	7	"Grandpa's Night Out"	Will Carsola	Will Carsola & Dave Stewart and Sean Conroy	November 2, 2014	103	1.23
After a night of heavy drinking, Grandpa awakes married to Crazy Linda and resorts to drastic measures to end the marriage. Meanwhile, Tommy seeks advice from the local town mutants to learn how to be himself.
9	8	"Coma"	Will Carsola	Will Carsola & Dave Stewart and Sean Conroy	November 9, 2014	108	1.17
Mr. Goodman falls into a coma and dreams of a world where he and Mr. Pickles have switched places. Meanwhile, Mr. Pickles discovers an evil doctor named Dr. Kelton and his wife/nurse planning to kill Mr. Goodman to harvest his organs. Mr. Pickles then kills the doctor and he kidnaps the nurse, having her serve as a prisoner in his lair.
10	9	"Where is Mr. Pickles?"	Will Carsola	Will Carsola & Dave Stewart and Sean Conroy	November 16, 2014	109	1.21
A disgruntled farmer hires mercenaries to capture and kill Mr. Pickles, and Tommy seeks help from the sheriff when he goes missing. Meanwhile, the Goodmans enjoy Floyd's hospitality where Mr. Goodman is shocked by Floyd's successful lifestyle.
11	10	"The Lair"	Will Carsola	Will Carsola & Dave Stewart and Sean Conroy	November 23, 2014	110	1.33
Grandpa wants to learn what actually goes on inside Mr. Pickles' doghouse to prove that he has not gone crazy, and gets more than he bargained for.

=== Season 2 (2016) ===
No. overall	No. in season	Title	Directed by	Written by	Original release date	Prod. code	US viewers (millions)
12	1	"Mental Asylum"	Will Carsola	Will Carsola & Dave Stewart and Sean Conroy	April 17, 2016	201	0.93
In the second season premiere, Mr. Pickles poses as the town's mayor and tries to bust Grandpa out of the asylum (since he landed there following the first season finale).
13	2	"Cops and Robbers"	Will Carsola	Will Carsola & Dave Stewart and Sean Conroy	April 24, 2016	202	1.10
Tommy gets caught in a big crime when he mistakes a midget for a child his own age.
14	3	"Serial Killers"	Will Carsola	Will Carsola & Dave Stewart and Sean Conroy	May 1, 2016	206	1.02
A prison bus full of serial killers are loose in Old Town, and Mr. Pickles is recruited as a K-9 cop.
15	4	"Shövenpucker"	Will Carsola	Will Carsola & Dave Stewart and Sean Conroy	May 8, 2016	205	0.96
With a metal thief loose in Old Town, Tommy and Mr. Pickles seek the help of an old superhero with a strange addiction.
16	5	"Fish?"	Will Carsola	Will Carsola & Dave Stewart and Sean Conroy	May 15, 2016	207	0.94
When a suspicious woman in town takes a romantic interest in Sheriff, Mr. Bojenkins sets out to reveal her true intentions.
17	6	"A.D.D." "Astronaut Dolphin Detective"	Will Carsola	Will Carsola & Dave Stewart and Sean Conroy	May 22, 2016	203	1.06
What was once a Mr. Pickles episode, turns into an episode of Astronaut Dolphin Detective. And in this standalone episode within an episode, Astronaut Dolphin Detective must stop an evil space shrimp from using its chainsaw spaceship to cut the Sun in half.
18	7	"My Dear Boy"	Will Carsola	Will Carsola & Dave Stewart and Sean Conroy	May 29, 2016	204	1.01
Tommy needs to learn responsibility and has to watch over Vito Pizzarelli's (Bigfoot) Deer Boy, a half-deer half-boy creature, and has trouble trying to get him under control.
19	8	"Vegans"	Will Carsola	Will Carsola & Dave Stewart and Sean Conroy	June 5, 2016	208	0.77
Beverly is invited to join a group of Vegans at the Vegan Headquarters without the intentions of how to be a true Vegan.
20	9	"Talent Show"	Will Carsola	Will Carsola & Dave Stewart and Sean Conroy	June 19, 2016	209	0.99
When Tommy tries to write jokes for the Old Town talent show, he crosses paths with a mysterious woman who has a face on her butt.
21	10	"Season 2 Finale"	Will Carsola	Will Carsola & Dave Stewart and Sean Conroy	June 26, 2016	210	0.93
In the season finale, Grandpa finds an ancient and mysterious coin that he thinks has something to do with Mr. Pickles. But the season ends with an unanswered cliffhanger when Grandpa finds the truth about Pickles' pet gimp, Steve.

=== Season 3 (2018) ===
No. overall	No. in season	Title	Directed by	Written by	Original release date	Prod. code	US viewers (millions)
22	1	"Brain Download"	Will Carsola	Will Carsola & Dave Stewart and Sean Conroy	February 26, 2018	301	0.67
Leaving off from the cliffhanger in season 2, Grandpa tries to hurry home to tell his family of where Agnes really was, she unfortunately beats him home and is later diagnosed by a doctor to have amnesia to make up where she's been. Tommy gets the idea for the family to go into town where Agnes can restore her memories and see where she's really been, this frightens Mr. Pickles and urges him to delete the memories.
23	2	"Momma's Boy"	Will Carsola	Will Carsola & Dave Stewart and Sean Conroy	February 26, 2018	303	0.62
Mr. Bojenkins tries to teach the Sheriff how to be a man instead of being a Momma's Boy, Mr. Bojenkins tells him that in order for him to be a man he will have to drink, fight, and have relations with a woman. Things take a turn for the worse when the two are stranded in the middle of the woods and the Sheriff has to man his way with a pack of wolves.
24	3	"S.H.O.E.S." "Secret Hyper Operational Exoskeleton System"	Will Carsola	Will Carsola & Dave Stewart and Sean Conroy	March 5, 2018	304	0.69
Tommy discovers a pair of robotic boots while looking for a new friend and he quickly befriends them. It's later discovered that S.H.O.E.S. is a military weapon, is taken away by some government agents and this urges Tommy to rescue S.H.O.E.S. with the help of Mr. Pickles.
25	4	"Telemarketers Are the Devil"	Will Carsola	Will Carsola & Dave Stewart and Sean Conroy	March 5, 2018	307	0.61
Stanley's whole office is captured by an evil farmer named Mr. Montgomery and is put to work in his fields to avenge his father's death from telemarketers. Beverly and Mr. Pickles try to find out where they've gone while Stanley is trying to escape the farm and save his co-workers.
26	5	"Gorzoth"	Will Carsola	Will Carsola & Dave Stewart and Sean Conroy	March 12, 2018	309	0.87
Linda finds a gold jewel-encrusted head called The Gorzoth and decides to sell it to the Goodman's, Grandpa decides to buy out of suspicion for Mr. Pickles while Tommy believes it to be a ball and decides to play with it. Meanwhile Linda and Beverly decide to go shopping but then are attacked by a mob of homeless people and they have to run for their lives.
27	6	"Tommy Goes to School"	Will Carsola	Will Carsola & Dave Stewart and Sean Conroy	March 12, 2018	305	0.76
Tommy goes to school for the first time and has difficulty making his way around since he's considered to be at the bottom of the social pyramid, Tommy then mistakenly makes his way to the top of the social pyramid and has trouble asking Suzie to the first grade dance. The principal of the school, Mr. Garcia is threatened by his old mob boss to whack the Sherriff for being buddies together.
28	7	"Sheriffs"	Will Carsola	Will Carsola & Dave Stewart and Sean Conroy	March 19, 2018	302	0.83
The Sheriff stars in his own episode of Sheriffs (a Cops parody) and he has difficulty trying to round up the different criminals that run amok in Old Town. The Sheriff also has trouble finding a present for his mother for her birthday and plans to outdo his sister Candy this year.
29	8	"Bullies"	Will Carsola	Will Carsola & Dave Stewart and Sean Conroy	March 19, 2018	306	0.79
After Tommy comes home with bruises from his bullies, The Blorpton Brothers, Beverly decides to go confront their parents, who are bad at raising them but is stuck watching them while their parents go bowling. Beverly tries her best to rehabilitate them until the kids get kidnapped by a violent biker gang and she has to rescue them.
30	9	"Tommy's Cartoon"	Will Carsola	Will Carsola & Dave Stewart and Sean Conroy	March 26, 2018	308	0.77
Tommy decides to make and produce his own cartoon about a pineapple wearing a funny hat to teach why drugs are bad, this ultimately gets the popular show Astronaut Dolphin Detective to get cancelled and the creator seeking his own outlet to use drugs and spread the message to use drugs with Tommy's classmates.
31	10	"Season 3 Finale"	Will Carsola	Will Carsola, Dave Stewart and Sean Conroy	March 26, 2018	310	0.73
Grandpa decides that he had enough of Mr. Pickles' torment and decides to move away up into the mountains, Mr. Pickles follows him there to torment him once again, but to his shock, he finds out that Grandpa planned for him to follow him and chose a secluded location so he could kill him. However, due to a few twists of fate (especially due to Mr. Pickles talking via a speaker), Mr. Pickles escapes Grandpa's grasp and manages to frame him for murder as payback. But before the Sheriff can take him to jail, he swerves his police car off the mountainside and crashes into the woods. As the Sheriff regains consciousnesses, he soon finds out that Grandpa has disappeared from his car and only notices a trail of footprints heading into the snowy valley forest as the series is left off on another unanswered cliffhanger.

=== Season 4 (2019) ===
No. overall	No. in season	Title	Directed by	Written by	Original release date	Prod. code	US viewers (millions)
32	1	"The Tree of Flesh"	Tom Riffel	Jacob Young, Anne Gregory, Joseph Heslinga, Robert Frenay, Gerald Grissette, & James Callahan	November 18, 2019	401	0.66
After Mr. Pickles framed Grandpa for murder in the Season 3 finale, Sheriff learns of Grandpa’s whereabouts, and heads out of the country to track him down. However, Grandpa takes Sheriff's gun and forces him to take him to Mr. Pickles's ancestral island home, gaining an accomplice in one of Mr. Pickles's former followers as they scheme to snipe the dog. Though Mr. Pickles appears to outwit and kill Grandpa by using an ancient incantation to switch bodies with the owner of a show dog he had been having sex with, he ends up being killed for real, as Grandpa used the same spell to switch bodies with Mr. Pickles's former servant and then the show dog; although, Grandpa's victory is cut short as he, in the show dog's body, gives birth to Mr. Pickles' puppy, who's menacing growls show up that the blood line of demons has not yet been interrupted.
