= Bob Hope television specials =

American television specials (1950–1996)

The following is a list of Bob Hope's television specials. Hope made his television debut on the inaugural broadcast of Los Angeles station KTLA in January 1947 and appeared on various television shows, particularly Christmas specials and various entertainment specials for the U.S. Armed Forces. A total of 272 NBC variety specials hosted by Bob Hope were produced from 1950 to 1996. These variety specials were produced and broadcast in black-and-white up to December 1965; the December 1965 Christmas show and all subsequent Bob Hope specials were produced and broadcast in color.

In addition to his television specials, Hope appeared on the series Bob Hope Presents the Chrysler Theatre from 1963 to 1967.

== 1950s ==
=== 1950 ===
- Star Spangled Revue (4/9/50)
- The Bob Hope Show (5/27/50)
- The Bob Hope Show (9/14/50)
- The Bob Hope Show (11/26/50)
- The Bob Hope Show (12/14/50)

=== 1951 ===
- The Bob Hope Show (4/8/51)
- The Bob Hope Show (10/14/51)
- The Bob Hope Show (11/25/51)

=== 1952 ===
- The Bob Hope Show (3/9/52)
- The Bob Hope Show (4/26/52)
- The Bob Hope Show (6/15/52)
- The Bob Hope Show (10/12/52)
- The Bob Hope Show (11/9/52)
- The Bob Hope Show (12/7/52)

=== 1953 ===
- The Bob Hope Show (1/4/53)
- The Bob Hope Show (2/1/53)
- The Bob Hope Show (3/1/53)
- The Bob Hope Show (3/22/53)
- The Bob Hope Show (3/29/53)
- The Bob Hope Show (4/19/53)
- The Bob Hope Show (5/24/53)
- The Bob Hope Show (6/14/53)
- The Bob Hope Show (10/20/53)
- The Bob Hope Show (11/17/53)
- The Bob Hope Christmas Show (12/14/53)

=== 1954 ===
- The Bob Hope Show (1/26/54)
- The Bob Hope Show (2/16/54)
- The Bob Hope Show (3/16/54)
- The Bob Hope Show (4/13/54)
- The Bob Hope Show (6/1/54)
- The Bob Hope Show (10/12/54)
- The Bob Hope Show (11/5/54)
- The Bob Hope Show (12/7/54)

=== 1955 ===
- The Bob Hope Christmas Show (1/9/55)
- The Bob Hope Show (2/1/55)
- The Bob Hope Show (3/1/55)
- The Bob Hope Show (4/26/55)
- The Bob Hope Special (5/24/55)
- The Bob Hope Chevy Show (10/4/55)
- The Bob Hope Chevy Show (11/15/55)
- The Bob Hope Chevy Christmas Show (12/27/55)

=== 1956 ===
- The Bob Hope Chevy Show (2/7/56)
- The Bob Hope Chevy Show (2/28/56)
- The Bob Hope Chevy Show (3/21/56)
- The Bob Hope Chevy Show (5/1/56)
- The Bob Hope Chevy Show (5/22/56)
- The Bob Hope Chevy Show (6/17/56)
- The Bob Hope Chevy Show (10/24/56)
- The Bob Hope Chevy Show (11/18/56)
- The Bob Hope Chevy Christmas Show (12/28/56)

=== 1957 ===
- The Bob Hope Chevy Show (1/25/57)
- The Bob Hope Chevy Show (3/10/57)
- The Bob Hope Chevy Show (4/8/57)
- The Bob Hope Chevy Show (5/6/57)
- The Bob Hope Show (10/6/57)
- The Bop Hope Show (11/24/57)

=== 1958 ===
- The Bob Hope Show (2/6/58)
- The Bob Hope Show (3/2/58)
- The Bob Hope Show (4/5/58)
- The Bob Hope Buick Show (10/15/58)
- The Bob Hope Buick Show (11/21/58)

=== 1959 ===
- The Bob Hope Buick Christmas Show (1/16/59)
- The Bob Hope Buick Show (2/6/59)
- The Bob Hope Buick Show (2/10/59)
- The Bob Hope Buick Show (3/13/59)
- The Bob Hope Buick Show (4/15/59)
- The Bob Hope Buick Show (5/15/59)
- The Bob Hope Buick Show (10/8/59)
- The Bob Hope Buick Show (11/9/59)
- The Bob Hope Buick Show (12/12/59)

== 1960s ==
=== 1960 ===
- The Bob Hope Buick Christmas Show (1/13/60)
- The Bob Hope Buick Show (2/22/60)
- The Bob Hope Buick Show (4/22/60)
- The Bob Hope Buick Show (10/3/60)
- The Bob Hope Buick Show (10/22/60)
- The Bob Hope Show (11/16/60)
- The Bob Hope Show (12/12/60)

=== 1961 ===
- The Bob Hope Buick Christmas Show (1/11/61)
- The Bob Hope Buick Sports Awards Show (2/15/61)
- The Bob Hope Buick Show (4/12/61)
- The Bob Hope Buick Show (5/13/61)
- The World of Bob Hope (10/29/61)
- The Bob Hope Special (12/13/61)

=== 1962 ===
- The Bob Hope Christmas Show (1/24/62)
- The Bob Hope Special (3/22/62)
- The Bob Hope Special (4/25/62)
- The Bob Hope Special (10/24/62)
- The Bob Hope Special (11/29/62)

=== 1963 ===
- The Bob Hope Christmas Show (1/16/63)
- The Bob Hope Special (3/13/63)
- The Bob Hope Special (5/15/63)
- The Bob Hope Special (9/27/63)
- The Bob Hope Special (10/25/63)
- The Bob Hope Special (11/15/63)
- The Bob Hope Special (12/13/63) — Hosted by Jack Benny and Bing Crosby due to Hope unable to perform due to an eye surgery to remove a blood clot. Hope appeared in pre-recorded pieces with a Benny monologue and Crosby singing.

=== 1964 ===
- The Bob Hope Christmas Special (1/17/64)
- The Bob Hope Special (2/14/64)
- The Bob Hope Special (3/20/64)
- The Bob Hope Special (4/17/64)
- The Bob Hope Special (9/25/64)
- The Bob Hope Thanksgiving Special (11/20/1964)
- The Bob Hope Special (12/18/64)

=== 1965 ===
- The Bob Hope Christmas Show (1/15/65)
- The Bob Hope Special (2/12/65)
- The Bob Hope Special (3/26/65)
- The Bob Hope Special (4/16/65)
- The Bob Hope Special (9/29/65)
- The Bob Hope Special (10/20/65) — The last special filmed in black and white.
- The Bob Hope Special (12/15/65) — The first special filmed in color; all subsequent specials were exclusively in color.

=== 1966 ===
- The Bob Hope Vietnam Christmas Show (1/19/66)
- The Bob Hope Special (2/16/66)
- The Bob Hope Special (3/16/66)
- The Bob Hope Special (9/28/66)
- The Bob Hope Special: Murder at NBC (10/19/66)
- A Bob Hope Comedy Special Starring Bing and Me (11/18/66)

=== 1967 ===
- The Bob Hope Vietnam Christmas Show (1/18/67)
- The Bob Hope Special (2/15/67)
- The Bob Hope Special (3/15/67)
- The Bob Hope Special (9/20/67)
- The Bob Hope Special (10/16/67)
- The Bob Hope Special: Shoot-In at NBC (11/8/67)
- The Bob Hope Special (11/29/67)
- The Bob Hope Special (12/14/67)

=== 1968 ===
- The Bob Hope Vietnam Christmas Show (1/18/68)
- The Bob Hope Special: The Opening of the New Madison Square Garden (2/12/68)
- The Bob Hope Special (3/20/68)
- The Bob Hope Special (4/11/68)
- The Bob Hope Special (9/25/68)
- The Bob Hope Special (10/14/68)
- The Bob Hope Special (11/6/68)
- The Bob Hope Special (11/27/68)
- The Bob Hope Special (12/19/68)

=== 1969 ===
- The Bob Hope Christmas Special: Around the World with the USO (1/16/69)
- The Bob Hope Special (2/17/69)
- The Bob Hope Special (3/19/69)
- The Bob Hope Special (4/17/69)
- The Bob Hope Special (9/22/69)
- The Bob Hope Special (10/13/69)
- The Bob Hope Special (11/6/69)
- The Bob Hope Special (11/24/69)
- The Bob Hope Special (12/18/69)

== 1970s ==
=== 1970 ===
- The Bob Hope Vietnam Christmas Show (1/15/70)
- The Bob Hope Special (2/16/70)
- The Bob Hope Special (3/18/70)
- The Bob Hope Special (4/13/70)
- The Bob Hope Special (10/5/70)
- The Bob Hope Special (11/16/70)
- The Bob Hope Special (12/7/70)

=== 1971 ===
- The Bob Hope Vietnam Christmas Show (1/14/71)
- The Bob Hope Special (2/15/71)
- The Bob Hope Special (4/5/71)
- The Bob Hope Special (9/13/71)
- The Bob Hope Special (11/7/71)
- The Bob Hope Special (12/9/71)

=== 1972 ===
- The Bob Hope Vietnam Christmas Show (1/17/72)
- The Bob Hope Special (2/27/72)
- The Bob Hope Special (3/13/72)
- The Bob Hope Special (4/10/72)
- The Bob Hope Special (4/27/72)
- The Bob Hope Special (10/5/72)
- The Bob Hope Special (12/10/72)

=== 1973 ===
- The Bob Hope Vietnam Christmas Show (1/17/73)
- The Bob Hope Special (2/8/73)
- The Bob Hope Special (3/7/73)
- The Bob Hope Special (4/19/73)
- The Bob Hope Special (9/26/73)
- The Bob Hope Special (11/13/73)
- The Bob Hope Special (12/9/73)

=== 1974 ===
- The Bob Hope Special (1/24/74)
- The Bob Hope Special (3/1/74)
- Bob Hope Presents the Gillette Cavalcade of Champions (4/2/74)
- The Bob Hope Special (9/25/74)
- The Bob Hope Special (12/15/74)

=== 1975 ===
- Bob Hope Presents the Stars of Tomorrow (3/5/75)
- Bob Hope on Campus (4/17/75)
- Highlights of a Quarter Century of Bob Hope on Television (10/24/75)
- Bob Hope's Christmas Party (12/14/75)

=== 1976 ===
- The Bob Hope Comedy Special (2/13/76)
- Bob Hope Special: Bob Hope in "Joys" (3/5/76)
- The Bob Hope Bicentennial Star Spangled Spectacular (7/4/76)
- Bob Hope's World of Comedy (10/29/76)
- Bob Hope's Christmas Comedy Special (12/13/76)

=== 1977 ===
- Bob Hope's All-Star Comedy Spectacular From Lake Tahoe (1/21/77)
- Bob Hope's All-Star Comedy Tribute to Vaudeville (3/25/77)
- Bob Hope - On the Road with Bing (10/28/77, scheduled tribute to Hope/Crosby "Road" pictures re-edited following Bing Crosby's death)
- The Bob Hope All Star Christmas Comedy Special (12/19/77)

=== 1978 ===
- Bob Hope's All-Star Tribute to the Palace Theater (1/8/78)
- The Bob Hope Special from Palm Springs (2/13/78)
- Bob Hope's All-Star Comedy Spectacular from Australia (4/15/78)
- Happy Birthday, Bob (5/29/78)
- Bob Hope's Salute to the 75th Anniversary of the World Series (10/18/78)
- Bob Hope's All-Star Christmas Show (12/22/78)

=== 1979 ===
- The Bob Hope Special (1/28/79)
- The Bob Hope Special (3/2/79)
- The Bob Hope Salute to the 1920s and 1930s (5/14/79)
- Bob Hope's All-Star Comedy Birthday Party (5/30/79)
- Bob Hope on the Road to China (9/16/79)
- Bob Hope on Campus (11/19/79)
- The Bob Hope Christmas Special (12/13/79)

== 1980s ==
=== 1980 ===
- Bob Hope Special: Hope, Women and Song (1/21/80)
- Bob Hope's Overseas Christmas Tours, Part 1 (2/3/80)
- Bob Hope's Overseas Christmas Tours, Part 2 (2/10/80)
- Bob Hope in the Star-Makers (3/17/80)
- Bob Hope's All-Star Comedy Birthday Party (5/28/80)
- Bob Hope's All-Star Look at TV's Prime Time Wars (9/6/80)
- Bob Hope for President (11/1/80)
- The Bob Hope Christmas Special (12/16/80)

=== 1981 ===
- The Bob Hope 30th Anniversary TV Special (1/18/81)
- Bob Hope's Funny Valentine Special (2/11/81)
- Bob Hope's Spring Fling (4/13/81)
- Bob Hope's All-Star Comedy Birthday Party at West Point (5/25/81)
- Bob Hope's All-Star Comedy Look at the New Season: It's Still Free and Well Worth It! (9/27/81)
- Bob Hope's All-Star Celebration Opening the Gerald R. Ford Presidential Museum (10/22/81)
- Bob Hope's Stand Up and Cheer for the National Football League's 60th Year (11/22/81)
- The Bob Hope Christmas Special (12/20/81)

=== 1982 ===
- Bob Hope's Women I Love: Beautiful but Funny (2/28/82)
- Bob Hope Laughs with the Movie Awards (3/28/82)
- Bob Hope's Stars Over Texas (5/3/82)
- Bob Hope's All-Star Birthday Party at Annapolis (5/25/82)
- Bob Hope's Star-Studded Spoof of the New TV Season - G-Rated - with Glamour, Glitter and Gags (10/3/82)
- Bob Hope's Pink Panther Thanksgiving Gala (11/21/82)
- The Bob Hope Christmas Special (12/20/82)

=== 1983 ===
- Bob Hope's All-Star Super Bowl Party (1/29/83)
- Bob Hope's Road to Hollywood (3/2/83)
- Bob Hope in Who Makes the World Laugh? (4/20/83)
- Happy Birthday, Bob! (5/23/83)
- Bob Hope's Salute to NASA - 25 Years of Reaching for the Stars (9/19/83)
- Bob Hope Goes to College (11/23/83)
- Bob Hope's Merry Christmas Show (12/19/83)

=== 1984 ===
- Bob Hope's USO Christmas in Beirut (1/15/84)
- Bob Hope's Wicki-Wacki Special from Waikiki (2/27/84)
- Bob Hope in Who Makes the World Laugh? Part 2 (4/4/84)
- Bob Hope's Super Birthday Special (5/28/84)
- Bob Hope's Hilarious Unrehearsed Antics of the Stars (9/28/84)
- Ho Ho Hope's Christmas Hour (12/16/84)

=== 1985 ===
- Bob Hope Lampoon's Television 1985 (2/24/85)
- Bob Hope's Comedy Salute to the Soaps (4/15/85)
- Bob Hope's Happy Birthday Homecoming (5/23/85)
- Bob Hope Buys NBC? (9/17/85)
- The Bob Hope Christmas Show (12/15/85)

=== 1986 ===
- Bob Hope's All-Star Super Bowl Party (1/25/86)
- Bob Hope's Royal Command Performance from Sweden (3/19/86)
- Bob Hope Special (Easter Joy) (4/19/86)
- Bob Hope's High-Flying Birthday (5/26/86)
- Bob Hope Lampoons the New TV Season (9/15/86)
- Bob Hope's Bagful of Christmas Cheer (12/21/86)

=== 1987 ===
- From Tahiti: Bob Hope's Tropical Comedy Special (2/23/87)
- Bob Hope with His Beautiful Easter Bunnies and Other Friends (4/19/87)
- Bob Hope's High-Flying Birthday Extravaganza (5/25/87)
- NBC Investigates Bob Hope (9/17/87)
- The Bob Hope Christmas Show - A Snow Job in Florida (12/19/87)

=== 1988 ===
- Bob Hope's USO Christmas from the Persian Gulf: Around the World in Eight Days (1/9/88)
- Happy Birthday, Bob (5/16/88)
- Stand By for HNN - The Hope News Network (9/8/88)
- Bob Hope's Jolly Christmas Show (12/19/88)

=== 1989 ===
- Bob Hope's Super Bowl Party (1/21/89)
- Bob Hope's Easter Vacation in the Bahamas (3/25/89)
- Bob Hope's Fun Birthday Spectacular from Paris (5/24/89)
- Bob Hope's Love Affair with Lucy (9/23/89)
- Bob Hope's Christmas in Hawaii (12/16/89)

== 1990s ==
=== 1990 ===
- Bob Hope Lampoons Show Business (2/17/90)
- Bob Hope's Spring Fling of Comedy and Glamour from Acapulco (4/8/90)
- Bob Hope's USO Road Tour to the Berlin Wall and Moscow (5/19/90)
- Bob Hope: Don't Shoot, It's Only Me (9/15/90)
- Bob Hope's 1990 Christmas Show (12/15/90)

=== 1991 ===
- Bob Hope's Christmas Cheer from Saudi Arabia (1/12/91)
- Bob Hope's Yellow Ribbon Celebration (4/5/91, around the time of the Gulf War)
- Bob Hope & Friends: Making New Memories (9/12/91)
- Bob Hope's Cross-Country Christmas Show (12/18/91)

=== 1992 ===
- Bob Hope and Other Young Comedians (3/14/92)
- Bob Hope's America: Red, White and Beautiful - The Swimsuit Edition (5/16/92)
- Bob Hope Presents the Ladies of Laughter (11/28/92)
- Bob Hope's Four-Star Christmas Fiesta (12/19/92)

=== 1993 ===
- Bob Hope: The First 90 Years (5/14/93)
- Bob Hope's Bag Full of Christmas Memories (12/15/93)

=== 1994 ===
- Bob Hope's Birthday Memories (5/14/94)
- Bob Hope's Young Comedians: Making America Laugh (8/27/94)
- Bob Hope's Christmas: Hopes for the Holidays (12/14/94)

=== 1995 ===
- Bob Hope's Young Comedians: A New Generation of Laughs (3/25/95)

=== 1996 ===
- Bob Hope... Laughing with the Presidents (11/23/96)
