= Bob Hope's Yellow Ribbon Celebration =

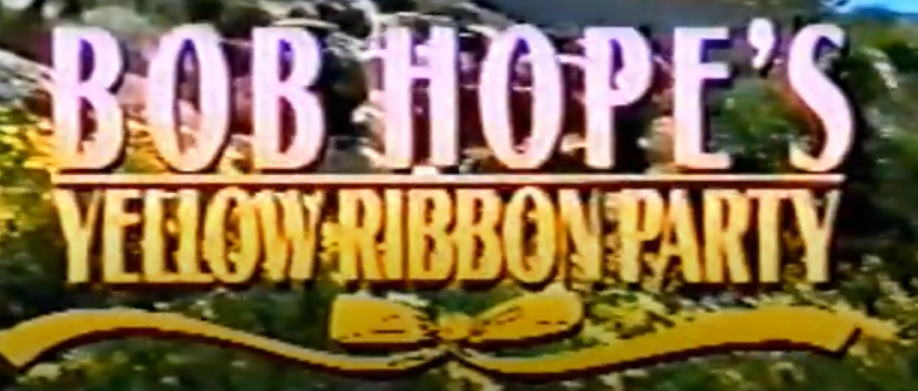
- Written by: Robert L. Mills
- Directed by: Tim Kiley
- Narrated by: John Harlan
- Country of origin: United States
- Original language: English

Production
- Executive producer: Bob Hope
- Producer: Linda Hope
- Running time: 1 hour
- Production company: Hope Enterprises Inc.

Original release
- Network: NBC
- Release: April 5, 1991

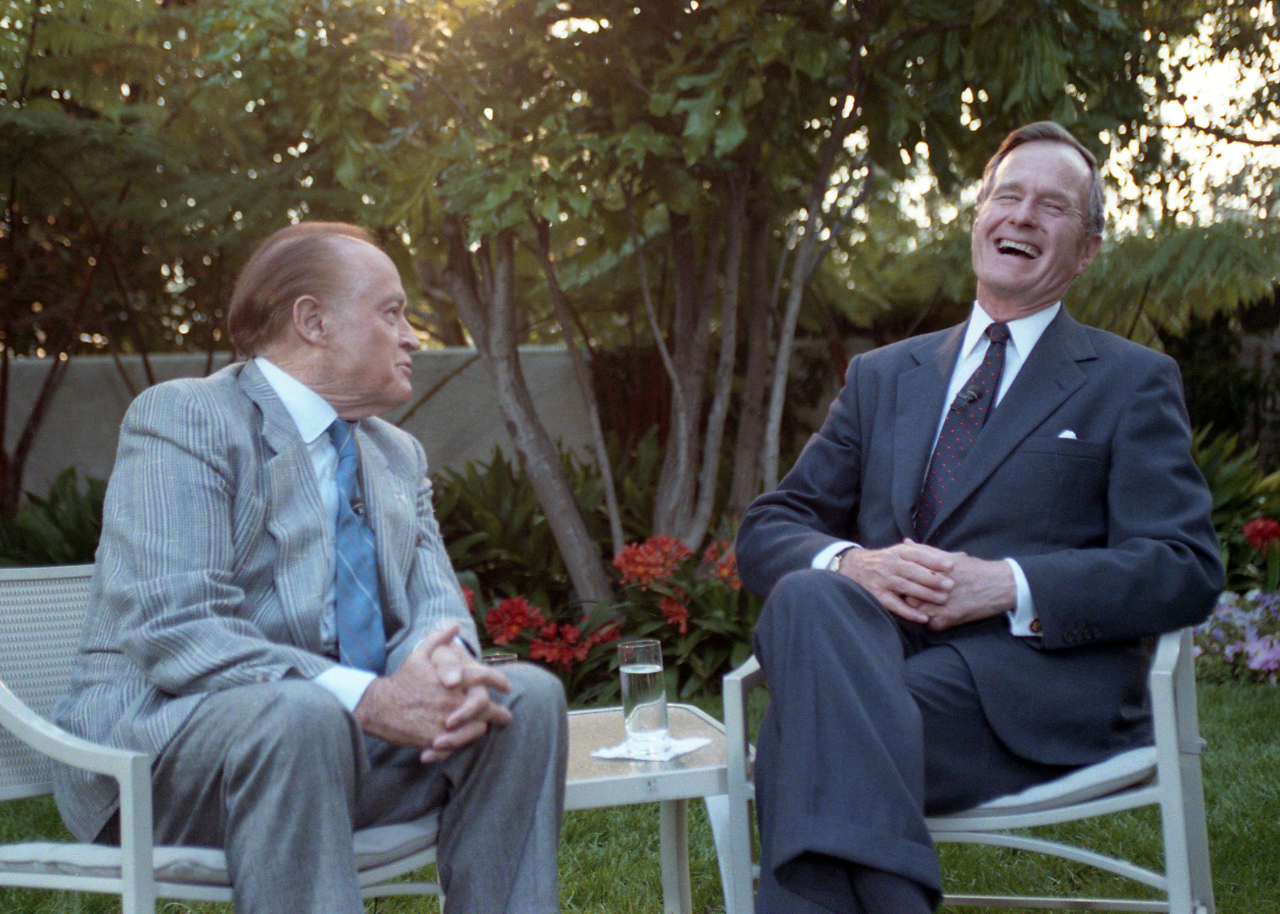
Bob Hope and George H. W. Bush filming a portion of the special

Bob Hope's Yellow Ribbon Celebration was a television special filmed at Bob Hope's residence in Palm Springs, California, to support and welcome back the troops who fought in the 1991 Gulf War. It aired on NBC April 5, 1991.

== Synopsis and set list ==
The special opens with Bob Hope and his wife Dolores siting outside on their lawn when they are informed by a butler that someone is here to see them. He doesn't know the person, but he was told to stop by if he was ever in the area. The person turns out to be a servicemember who saw him in Saudi Arabia, with his family. He asks if he brought anybody else, and hundreds of Marines enter his estate. Hope responds "Tell the kitchen it is an emergency" as the opening title rolls.

- Bob Hope begins the special with his own routine, making jokes about Saddam Hussein, George H. W. Bush, the upcoming election, among other things.
- Ann Jillian sings "Let the Good Times Roll".
- Clint Black sings "Put Yourself in My Shoes".
- Patti LaBelle sings "There is a Winner in You".
- A pre-recorded message from Colin Powell.
- Brooke Shields sings "Voices that Care".
- Col. Carlton W. Fulford Jr., commanding officer 7th Marine Regiment introduces a skit featuring Bob Hope, Gerald McRaney (the star of Major Dad), and Clint Holmes satirizing military life while being stationed in the desert.
- Hope returns as master of ceremonies, only to again be interrupted by his butler, who says another person he once told to come by if he was ever in the neighborhood has dropped by. This is another serviceman, SgtMaj Walker who first saw Hope in one of his shows in Vietnam in 1966.
- Clint Holmes sings "Playground in My Mind".
- Col. Ed McMahon presents a one man skit "updating the troops" on the war.
- A brief statement from Gerald Ford accompanied by Betty Ford.
- A skit between Gerald McRaney and wife Delta Burke as she informs him of the increasingly absurd things that have happened since he was gone.
- Marie Osmond performs "Boogie Woogie Bugle Boy".
- General James Stewart gives a speech on his thoughts about Democracy in Iraq.
- A pre-recorded message from Gen. Norman Schwarzkopf Jr.
- Another skit from Ed McMahon informing the troops of what to expect from spring break.
- Dolores Hope sings Embraceable You.
- A prerecorded conversation between Bob Hope and President George H. W. Bush.
- Marie Osmond sings "God Bless the U.S.A.".

Notable audience attendees included:

- Walter Annenberg
- Leonore Annenberg
- Gene Autry
- Khrystyne Haje
- Lawrence Taylor
- Aaron Tippin
- General William Westmoreland

== See also ==
- Bob Hope television specials
- Voices That Care
- National Victory Celebration
