= Restavrant =

American country punk band

Restavrant!
- Also known as: Snakearm
- Genres: Country punk, punk
- Members: Troy Murrah; Tyler Whiteside
- Past members: J. State
- Website: restavrant.com

Restavrant (stylized as REST^vRANT) is an American country punk band. The band was founded by guitarist and vocalist Troy Murrah, who later recruited drummer Tyler Whiteside. The band's musical style is eclectic; Whiteside does not use a standard drum kit. In 2015, the band briefly changed their name to Snakearm, before changing it back to Restavrant by 2016.

== History ==
Restavrant was founded by Troy Murrah as a one-man band. Murrah was inspired by a Bob Log III concert. Initially a one-piece band, Murrah would later bring on drummer J. State, and then current drummer Tyler Whiteside. In 2008, the band released their first album, Returns to the Tomb of Guiliano Medidici, on Narnack Records. 2015, the band was briefly renamed as Snakearm; Murrah said the name came from the nickname of a friend who was killed in a drive-by shooting, and that the goal of the band following the rebrand would be to "create music with integrity"; the band continued to play their old songs under the new name. By 2016, the band had changed its name back to Restavrant. The band composed the theme song for the Adult Swim show Momma Named Me Sheriff.

== Musical style ==
Restavrant is composed of Troy Murrah, the guitarist and vocalist, and drummer Tyler Whiteside; Whiteside does not use a traditional drum kit, instead using a kit consisting of things like a hubcap and license plate. The band's style has been described as country punk, "blues-punk", and "electro roots rock". Daniel Willis of Riff Magazine described the band as "punk, if not exactly in sound, then definitely in ethos", noting drummer Tyler Whiteside's use of a DIY drum kit made of "trash". Adam Joseph of Monterey County NOW described the band's sound as "techno beats humping old folky-sounding guitar, plus a hell of a lot of bottleneck slide.". Jonathan Kardasz of Bristol24/7 called them "a thoroughly modern rock band", and praised their live performances as being better than their studio recordings. LA Weekly writer Paul Bradley described the band's musical style as "punkabilly" and a "grimy blend of hillbilly hootenanny and relentless beats". Murrah regards the band's influences as punk, country, and blues.

== Discography ==
- 2008: Returns to the Tomb of Guiliano Medidici (2008)
- 2012: Yeah, I Carve Cheetahs
- 2013: Sawdust & Seathorns (EP)
- 2015: Concrete (EP)
- 2017: Staring at Lint (EP)
- 2021: 4 For Being Physical (EP)
