= Interruption =

Interruption may refer to:

- Interruption (speech), a speech event when one person breaks in to interject while another person is talking
- Interruption science, interruption and human behavior
- Interruption marketing, a pejorative term for the advertising technique
- Interruptions (epic theatre), the technique defined by Bertolt Brecht
- Interruption (map projection), a map projection where the globe is segmented to minimise distortion

== See also ==
- Interrupt, for the usage related to computing
