= Michael Jackson's Private Home Movies =

- Genre: Documentary
- Directed by: Brad Lachman
- Country of origin: United States

Production
- Producer: Marc Schaffel

Original release
- Network: Fox
- Release: April 24, 2003

Michael Jackson's Private Home Movies is a two-hour television special that premiered on FOX on April 24, 2003. The premiere was watched by 7.9 million viewers. The show provides "never-before-seen footage revealing his real life, family, and friends".

== Production ==
The special was produced in response to the negative publicity surrounding the TV special Living with Michael Jackson. Both NBC and FOX bidded for Michael Jackson's Private Home Movies, and FOX was ultimately chosen since they would allow the producers to have creative control over the project.

== Cast ==
- Michael Jackson
- Kieran Culkin (archive footage)
- Macaulay Culkin
- Jackie Jackson (archive footage)
- Janet Jackson (archive footage)
- Jermaine Jackson (archive footage)
- Marlon Jackson (archive footage)
- Tito Jackson (archive footage)
- Michael Jordan (archive footage)
- John Landis (archive footage)
- Emmanuel Lewis
- Maia Newley
- Princess Diana (archive footage)
- Brooke Shields
- Elizabeth Taylor (archive footage)
- Chris Tucker

== Reception ==
=== Viewership ===
On its premiere airing, the special was watched by 7.9 million viewers.
