= Jay Johnston =

American actor and comedian (born 1968)

- Born: October 22, 1968 (age 58); Chicago, Illinois, U.S.
- Education: Columbia College Chicago (BA)
- Occupations: Actor; comedian; handyman
- Years active: 1995–2022
- Children: 1

Jay James Johnston (born October 22, 1968) is an American former actor, comedian and handyman. He was a writer and cast member on Mr. Show with Bob and David and had roles on The Sarah Silverman Program, Moral Orel, Arrested Development, Bob's Burgers, and Mr. Pickles, as well as the lattermost's spin-off Momma Named Me Sheriff.

Johnston participated in the United States Capitol attack on January 6, 2021, and was arrested and charged on June 7, 2023. Following the incident, Johnston was fired from his longtime role as Jimmy Pesto on Bob's Burgers; he has not appeared in any films or television shows since. He pleaded guilty on July 8, 2024, and was sentenced to one year and one day in prison on October 28, 2024, but was pardoned by Donald Trump in January 2025.

== Early life and education ==
Johnston was born and raised in Chicago, Illinois. He has a younger brother named Tim. He earned a Bachelor of Arts degree in acting from Columbia College Chicago in 1993.

== Career ==
After graduating from college, Johnston later joined the Chicago Second City's touring comedy for a number of years and also performed in stage shows at the Annoyance Theater in Chicago.

From 1995 to 1998, Johnston worked as a sketch actor and writer on all four seasons of Mr. Show with Bob and David. After the conclusion of Mr. Show, Johnston had a recurring role on Arrested Development, as well as appearing in films such as Anchorman: The Legend of Ron Burgundy and Bicentennial Man.

Johnston and fellow Mr. Show regulars Dino Stamatopoulos and Scott Adsit were part of the creative team behind Adult Swim's stop-motion animation series Moral Orel, which ran from 2005 to 2008. Johnston wrote and directed episodes of the series and voiced multiple characters in the first two seasons.

Johnston starred on all three seasons of Comedy Central's The Sarah Silverman Program as "Officer Jay McPherson", the love interest of Sarah Silverman's sister Laura in the series. The series reunited Johnston with Mr. Show cast members Brian Posehn, Scott Aukerman, B. J. Porter, and Paul F. Tompkins.

Johnston had a recurring voice role as Jimmy Pesto Sr. in the Fox animated series Bob's Burgers from 2011 until his firing in 2021. The role was later recast to Eric Bauza in 2023.

Standing well over 6 feet tall, Johnston regularly played police and other law enforcement roles. Since his arrest, he has been a handyman.

== United States Capitol attack ==
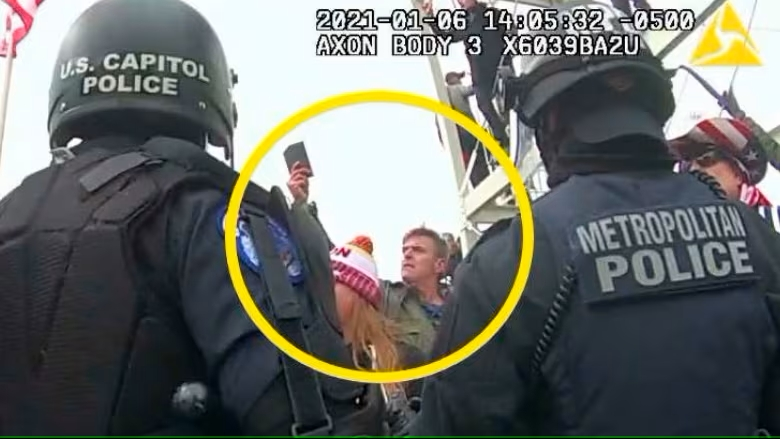
Photo released by the Justice Department and Washington Metro police showing Johnston at the riots.

In March 2021, a Twitter message by the FBI was seeking the identity of a man at the January 6 United States Capitol attack who bore a resemblance to Johnston and who was identified as Johnston by friends of the actor. In a December 21, 2021, article by The Daily Beast, two of Johnston's friends said he admitted to being at the Capitol on January 6. After the FBI tweet and the news of his alleged participation, Johnston's friends and colleagues from Mr. Show with Bob and David reached out to Johnston, but received no response. Johnston was fired from Bob's Burgers shortly after being identified.

The FBI arrested Johnston on June 7, 2023, and charged him with felony obstruction of officers during civil disorder as well as several misdemeanor offenses. He was released after paying a $25,000 bond.

Johnston pleaded guilty to a single felony count of obstructing officers during a civil disorder on July 8, 2024. On October 28, 2024, Judge Carl Nichols characterized Johnston's conduct as problematic and reprehensible, and sentenced him to one year and one day in prison, 40 hours of community service, and pay $2,000 in restitution.

In January 2025, Johnston was among those pardoned by Donald Trump when he entered office for his second term.

== Personal life ==
Johnston has a daughter, born in 2011 or 2012. As of October 2024, he was engaged to Sara Radovanovitch.

== Filmography ==
=== Film ===
Film work by Jay Johnston
Year	Title	Role	Notes
1998	Jack Frost	TV Weatherman	
1999	Bicentennial Man	Charles	
2000	The Independent	Soldier	
2000	Desperate but Not Serious	Mustachioed Cop	
2001	Not Another Teen Movie	Roadie	
2001	Hollywood Palms	Young Cop	
2002	Men in Black II	Agent	
2002	The Master of Disguise	Rex	
2003	Brainwarp	Guy Suave	Direct-to-video
2004	Anchorman: The Legend of Ron Burgundy	Eyewitness News Member	
2004	Wake Up, Ron Burgundy: The Lost Movie	Eyewitness News Member	
2005	Dirty Love	Waiter	
2006	Tenacious D in The Pick of Destiny	Gang Member	
2007	Project Clear Visions: The Anthrax Conspiracy	Michael Patrick	
2008	The Wayside	Dad	
2009	Secret at Arrow Lake	Dr. William Hardin	
2011	Demoted	Kline	
2015	Hell and Back	Rick the Lost Soul	Voice
2021	Something About Her	George	
2022	Wing Dad	Allen Marcus	

=== Television ===
Television work by Jay Johnston
Year	Title	Role	Notes
1995	Ellen	Transition Guy	Episode: "Hello, I Must Be Going"
1995–1998	Mr. Show with Bob and David	Various characters	28 episodes; also writer
1997	Just Shoot Me!	Exterminator	Episode: "Lemon Wacky Hello"
1997	Alright Already	Overnight Parcel Guy	Episode: "Again with the Porno Video"
1999	Ultimate Trek: Star Trek's Greatest Moments	Spock	Television film
2000	Tenacious D	FBI Agent	Episode: "Road Gig"
2001	DAG	Chainsaw	Episode: "Prom"
2001	Two Guys and a Girl	Cab Driver	Episode: "An Eye for a Finger"
2001	Spring Break Lawyer	Reporter	Television film
2001	Curb Your Enthusiasm	Jeremy	Episode: "Shaq"
2002	Malcolm in the Middle	Ed	Episode: "Reese Drives"
2002	Next!	Various	Pilot
2004	Sweetwater Tides	Abbott Lewison	Television film
2004	Last Laugh '04	Pervert	Television film
2004–2013	Arrested Development	Officer Taylor	10 episodes
2005	Weekends at the D.L.	Bill Combs / Darnell Dickerson	2 episodes
2005–2008	Moral Orel	Coach Stopframe / Various voices	30 episodes; also writer and director
2006	American Misfits	The Boss	3 episodes
2006	Lovespring International	Carl Jason	2 episodes
2006	Last Laugh '06	Officer 'Shuggatitz'	Television film
2007	Human Giant	Whale Trainer	Episode: "Let's Go"; also consultant writer
2007	Bad Dad	Drunk Bad Dad	Episode #1.2
2007	Larry the Cable Guy's Christmas Spectacular	Mormon Guy	Television film
2007–2010	The Sarah Silverman Program	Officer Jay McPherson	32 episodes
2009	Reno 911!	FBI Agent	Episode: "Viacom Grinch"
2009	Parks and Recreation	Ranger	Episode: "Hunting Trip"
2010	Community	Police Officer #2	Episode: "The Science of Illusion"
2010–2012	Mary Shelley's Frankenhole	The Wolfman / Various voices	11 episodes
2011	Jon Benjamin Has a Van	Greg Devlin	Episode: "Little Little Italy"
2011	Nick Swardson's Pretend Time	Various roles	5 episodes
2011	Guy Suave: Homicidal Spy	Guy Suave	Television film
2011–2021	Bob's Burgers	Jimmy Pesto / Foodie (voice)	43 episodes; replaced by Eric Bauza
2012	Anger Management	Rodney	Episode: "Charlie Tries to Prove Therapy Is Legit"
2012	NTSF:SD:SUV::	The Letterer	Episode: "Wasilla Hills Cop"
2013	Childrens Hospital	Capt. Beach-House	Episode: "Imaginary Friends"
2013	High School USA!	Officer Dumphy (voice)	5 episodes
2013–2019	Mr. Pickles	Mr. Goodman / various voices	30 episodes
2014	Comedy Bang! Bang!	Repairman	Episode: "Ellie Kemper Wears a Purple Ruffled Sleeveless Top & Lavender Flats"
2015	Rick and Morty	Coldstone Creamery Employee (voice)	Episode: "A Rickle in Time"
2015	W/ Bob & David	Various roles	4 episodes; also writer
2016	Modern Family	Carl	Episode: "Crazy Train"
2016	Hidden America with Jonah Ray	John	Episode: "Los Angeles: All That Glitters Is Not Gold"
2016–2017	Love	Pastor Lewis	4 episodes
2017	Animals	Ad Man 4	Episode: "Humans"
2018	Take My Wife	Guy	Episode #2.3
2018	The 5th Quarter	James Naismith	Episode: "Hashbrowns & Potaters"
2019	Kevin Hart's Guide to Black History	Various roles	Television film
2019	Dope State	Paul Standinghpin	Television film
2019–2021	Momma Named Me Sheriff	Mr. Goodman / Buff Swede (voice)	18 episodes
2020	Better Call Saul	Don Wachtell	Episode: "Wexler v. Goodman"

== See also ==
- List of cases of the January 6 United States Capitol attack (G-L)
- Criminal proceedings in the January 6 United States Capitol attack
- List of people granted executive clemency in the second Trump presidency
