= Robert L. Mills =

American educator

Robert Lee Mills (November 13, 1916 – January 16, 2006) was an American educator who was the longest-serving president of Georgetown College in Georgetown, Kentucky.

Dr. Mills served for 19 years, from 1959 to 1978, as president of Georgetown College. During his presidency, the Asher Science Center, the Cralle Student Center and most of the south campus were built. He was a native of Erlanger, Kentucky and earned his bachelor's, master's and doctoral degrees at the University of Kentucky. He received an honorary degree from William Jewell College. Before his presidency at Georgetown College, Mr. Mills worked for the Kentucky Department of Education, and served as registrar and dean of admissions at the University of Kentucky and chairman of the Department of Educational Administration at the University of Texas at Austin.

Mills' undergraduate degree was from the University of Kentucky where he was a member of Phi Kappa Tau fraternity.
