= Mr. Pickles =

American adult animated sitcom

- Genre: Adult animation; Black comedy; Comedy horror; Slasher; Sitcom; Splatter
- Created by: Will Carsola; Dave Stewart
- Written by: Will Carsola; Dave Stewart; Sean Conroy
- Directed by: Will Carsola
- Voices of: Brooke Shields; Dave Stewart; Frank Collison; Jay Johnston; Kaitlyn Robrock; Will Carsola
- Theme music composer: Mark Rivers
- Country of origin: United States
- Original language: English
- No. of seasons: 4
- No. of episodes: 32 (including pilot and series finale) (list of episodes)

Production
- Executive producers: Will Carsola; Dave Stewart; Michael J. Rizzo; Keith Crofford; Walter Newman
- Producers: Michael J. Rizzo; Eric Binns; Ollie Green; Sean Conroy
- Editor: Will Carsola
- Running time: 11 minutes
- Production companies: HotHouse Productions; Day by Day Productions; Williams Street

Original release
- Network: Adult Swim
- Release: August 25, 2013
- Release: September 21, 2014 – November 18, 2019

Related
- Momma Named Me Sheriff

Mr. Pickles is an American adult animated slasher sitcom created by Will Carsola and Dave Stewart for Cartoon Network's nighttime programming block Adult Swim. The series revolves around the Goodman family, especially their 6-year-old son named Tommy and the family's Border Collie dog, the satanic Mr. Pickles. The series aired from September 21, 2014, to November 18, 2019.

The first episode of season 4 was a surprise series finale, replacing the show with a new spin-off/sequel series titled Momma Named Me Sheriff.

== Plot ==
In the small, old-fashioned community of Old Town, the Goodman family and their innocent and dimwitted 6-year-old son Tommy have a satanic Border Collie dog named Mr. Pickles. The two spend their days romping around Old Town, while unknown to Tommy, the family or anyone except for Tommy's grandfather, Mr. Pickles secretly slips away to kill and mutilate his countless victims. Mr. Pickles will often reassemble and resurrect his victims which then reside in his underground lair and do his bidding. Despite his malevolent nature, he genuinely cares for Tommy, harming those that threaten him, get in his way or annoy him. Mr. Pickles brings some order to Old Town, which is otherwise riddled with crime in the face of the dimwitted sheriff.

== Characters ==
- Dave Stewart as Mr. Pickles, Floyd, Linda, and Deer Hunter #2
- Kaitlyn Robrock as Tommy Goodman, Candy
- Brooke Shields as Beverly Goodman
- Jay Johnston as Stanley Goodman
- Frank Collison as Henry Gobbleblobber, Mr. Bojenkins (Season 1–2)
- Will Carsola as Sheriff, Boss, and Deer Hunter #1
- Alex Désert as Mr. Bojenkins (Season 3, finale)

Additional voices

- Joey Lauren Adams as The Girl
- Pamela Adlon as Mary
- Bob Bergen as Crime Man
- Sean Conroy
- Andy Daly as Doctor
- Colton Dunn as Rich Snob, Darrel
- John Ennis
- Dave Foley as Scientist
- Vivica A. Fox as Poison
- Brett Gelman as Cheeseman
- Barbara Goodson as Agnes Gobbleblobber/Steve
- Elaine Hendrix as Lorena
- Carrie Keranen as Lisa
- Christine Lakin as Blonde Girl
- Michelle León
- Tom Kenny as Sidekick Boy
- Candi Milo as Butt-Faced Woman
- Tracy Morgan as Skids
- Iggy Pop as Texas Red
- Andy Richter
- Jacod Young
- Mark Rivers
- Henry Rollins as Government Agent Commander
- Stephen Root as Mr. Montgomery
- Amy Sedaris as Sally
- Steve-O as Pizza Delivery Guy
- Frank Vincent as Jon Gabagooli
- John Waters as Dr. Kelton
- "Weird Al" Yankovic as Vegan Muslim
- Rob Zombie as Ordutheus

== Production ==
The series, which is animated using Adobe Flash, was created by Will Carsola and Dave Stewart – known for Funny or Die Presents – and executive-produced by Will Carsola, Dave Stewart, and Michael J. Rizzo. The series was one of several shows pitched to Adult Swim, according to the creators, who also operate under the name "Day by Day". Stewart recalled promoting it as a "one-line sentence", while Carsola remembered that it derived from a "write-off" session, where the two present ideas to each other in the form of scribbles for their amusement. Carsola explained that ideas in this process are released from the pressure "of them being good", occasionally finding "one that sticks". They later explained at the 2014 San Diego Comic-Con that the idea was based on Lassie, but has become "more of its own thing since then."

Stewart's own female Australian Cattle Dog served as inspiration for the animators on the character of Mr. Pickles. Stewart even pointed out similarities between her and the main character, and jokingly called her "Ms. Pickles". Animation director Mike L. Mayfield recorded Stewart's dog playing around on video, with animators using the resulting footage as a basis for the character's movements. Its setting is roughly based on Richmond, Virginia, where the creators started out in entertainment before moving to Los Angeles. The creators are given creative freedom by the network, with Stewart explaining the notes received by them as "minimal", much to their surprise. The creators observed some inconsistencies as to what is considered unacceptable, but try not to question it and compromise instead.

Elaborating on its 11-minute running time, Carsola described it as a 22-minute show "squished" into a quarter-hour. Among the voices for the characters include Brooke Shields, Frank Collison, Jay Johnston and Carsola and Stewart themselves. Shields' role in the series came after looking at the creator's work for Funny or Die and obtaining the script for Mr. Pickles. According to Carsola, the two were dubious over her interest in the series, but after being cast she provided lines in a recording booth in New York City while the creators supervised over Skype.

== Episodes ==
Season	Episodes	Originally released	
Season	Episodes	First released	Last released
Pilot		August 25, 2013	
1	10	September 21, 2014	November 23, 2014
2	10	April 17, 2016	June 26, 2016
3	10	February 26, 2018	March 26, 2018
4	1	November 18, 2019	

== Broadcast and reception ==
In July 2013, the pilot episode was released online as part of a presentation of in-development shows for the network, partnered with KFC; viewers could vote for their favorite pilot, with the winner being broadcast on August 26, 2013. The series lost to Stoopid Buddy Stoodios' Übermansion (which ironically was rejected by the network), although the presentation as a whole won an Internet Advertising Campaign Award in 2014 for "Best TV Integrated Ad Campaign". The pilot was later published on the network's website on January 23, 2014, and on YouTube on March 10 of the same year, becoming viral with over 700,000 views after roughly a month later. The series was picked up for ten quarter-hour episodes for its first season, premiering on the network on September 21, 2014, following the ninth-season premiere of Squidbillies. A second season was mentioned at the 2014 Comic-Con.

Aaron Simpson of Cold Hard Flash called the series an amalgamation of Lassie and Superjail!, while observing some social commentary "to ensure this is more than just a multi-episodic sketch." Mike Hale of The New York Times labeled it "the less tasteful but more mainstream" counterpart to Tim & Eric's Bedtime Stories, another addition to the network. He wrote that the show was "more grisly than funny," but predicted it to have a cult following and that Shields' voice would add "surreal-pop-culture cachet".

In Australia, the series premiered on August 3, 2015, on The Comedy Channel, and then moved to the free to air Adult Swim block on 9Go!

In Canada, the series premiered on April 1, 2019, on Adult Swim.

In April 2017, a trailer was released promoting the season 3 premiere to air in fall 2017; however, this was later pushed back, for unknown reasons, to the following year. The first episode of season three premiered on February 26, 2018. The show was renewed for a fourth season before the third one even premiered.
