= Alex Désert =

American actor

- Education: Fiorello H. LaGuardia High School
- Occupation: Actor
- Years active: 1988–present
- Website: www.alexdesert.com

Alex Désert is an American actor, known for his roles in the TV series The Flash, The Heights, Becker, and Boy Meets World, as well as the voice of Nick Fury for The Avengers: Earth's Mightiest Heroes and Wolverine and the X-Men. Désert has been seen in Mom and Grey's Anatomy. Other television credits include Tyler Perry's House of Payne, House, A League of Their Own, Reno 911!, and The Sarah Silverman Program. In 2020, he started voicing Carl Carlson and Lou on The Simpsons, replacing Hank Azaria.

== Career ==
His motion picture credits include the independent hit Swingers, Playing God, High Fidelity, Bob Funk and PCU with Jeremy Piven, David Spade and Jon Favreau, and Alexander and the Terrible, Horrible, No Good, Very Bad Day, from Disney Studios. His Disney Channel Original Movie credits include Invisible Sister and Freaky Friday.

Désert has lent his voice to various animated series and video games, including The Avengers: Earth's Mightiest Heroes as Nick Fury; as Wise in the web series The LeBrons; Crystal Dynamic's Tomb Raider; and, Scarface: The World is Yours. He also portrayed the auto-tuned pimp Zimos in the 2011 THQ release, Saints Row: The Third. Starting in the World of Warcraft expansion Battle for Azeroth he portrayed the loa Bwonsamdi.

In addition to his acting career, Désert is one of the lead singers in Hepcat, a ska/reggae band that has toured the United States, Australia and Europe with bands such as The Mighty Mighty Bosstones and The Specials. Having released four albums, Hepcat's exposure has included national magazine features and an appearance on Late Night with Conan O'Brien, as well as collaboration with other bands like the Interrupters.

In 2020, he took over the role of Carl Carlson and Lou from Hank Azaria on The Simpsons in light of the George Floyd protests, starting with "Undercover Burns", which premiered on September 27, 2020.

== Filmography ==
=== Film ===
Year	Title	Role	Notes
1994	PCU	Mullaney	
1996	Swingers	Charles	Credited as Alex Desert
1997	Playing God	Bartender	
2000	High Fidelity	Louis	Credited as Alex Desert
2003	Masked and Anonymous	Valentine	
2003	Chicken Party	Durell Mills	Short film
2004	Death of the Day	Young Vance / The Masked Avenger	Short film
2005	Pretty Persuasion	Joe (Security Guard)	
2009	Bob Funk	Sonny	
2010	Lego: The Adventures of Clutch Powers	Skelly (voice)	Direct to video
2014	Alexander and the Terrible, Horrible, No Good, Very Bad Day	Mr. Rogue	
2015	Isaac and Quincy	Quincy	Short film
2016	Losing in Love	Bob	
2017	Alvin and the Alien	Alien (voice)	Short film
2020	Louden	Louden	Short film

=== Television ===
Year	Title	Role	Notes
1988–1989	TV 101	Holden Hines	13 episodes
1989	Free Spirit	Jeremy	Episode: "Too Much of a Good Thing"
1990–1991	The Flash	Julio Mendez	22 episodes Credited as Alex Desert
1990	A Different World	Livingston	Episode: "The Power of the Pen"
1990	CBS Schoolbreak Special	Jordan	Episode: "The Girl with the Crazy Brother"
1990	Beverly Hills, 90210	Robinson	Episode: "Class of Beverly Hills"
1992	The Heights	Stan Lee	13 episodes
1993	Lush Life	Lester	Television film Credited as Alex Desert
1994	Galaxy Beat	Larry Longspan	Television short
1995–1996	Boy Meets World	Eli Williams / The Hepcat	16 episodes
1998–2004	Becker	Jake Malinak	Main cast 129 episodes
2004	Harry Greene and Eugene		Unknown episodes
2006	Katie Sullivan	Alex	Television film
2007	The Sarah Silverman Program	Eugene	Episode: "Face Wars"
2008	Reno 911!	Thaddeus Owens III	Episode: "Strong Sister"; Credited as Alex Desert
2008	Wolverine and the X-Men	Nick Fury (voice)	Episode: "Wolverine vs. Hulk"
2008	Rita Rocks	Frank	Episode: "The Crying Game"
2009	House	Jay-Bird	Episode: "Broken"
2010	Dirty Backs	Killer Greg	Miniseries
2010–2013	The Avengers: Earth's Mightiest Heroes	Nick Fury, Jack Fury, Damocles Officer (voice)	16 episodes
2011	Let's Do This!	General Sam Tundiki	Television film
2011–2014	The LeBrons	Wise (voice)	23 episodes
2012	Let It Shine	Levi	Television film
2012	Let's Do This!	Dr. David Zucco	Television film
2012	In Session with Jonathan Pessin	Dr. Alex	Episode: "Pilot"
2014	Grey's Anatomy	Miles Green	Credited as Alex Desert; Episode: "Take It Back"
2014	Mom	Wes	Credited as Alex Desert; Episode: "Toilet Wine and the Earl of Sandwich"
2014	Doc McStuffins	Sam the Snake, Serpent Sam (voice)	2 episodes
2014	Scandal	Bill Warren	Episode: "The Key"; Credited as Alex Desert
2015	Public Morals	Diamond Jack	Episode: "Collection Day"
2015	Invisible Sister	Mr. Perkins	Television film
2016–2017	The Flash	Captain Julio Mendez	2 episodes
2016–2019	Better Things	Donte	5 episodes Credited as Alex Desert
2016	Better Call Saul	Officer Baker	Episode: "Switch"
2016	Sing It!	Barry	10 episodes
2016	How to Get Away with Murder	Keith Travers	Episode: "It's About Frank"
2017	Once Upon a Time	Stanum / Tin Man	Episode: "Where Bluebirds Fly"
2017–2019	The Stinky & Dirty Show	Steam, Carry (voice)	3 episodes
2017–2020	Spider-Man	Jefferson Davis / Swarm (voice)	3 episodes
2018–2019	Mr. Pickles	Mr. Bojenkins (voice)	8 episodes
2018	Station 19	Oliver	Episode: "Hot Box"
2018	Freaky Friday	Mike Harper	Television film
2019–2021	Momma Named Me Sheriff	Mr. Bojenkins (voice)	9 episodes
2019	Shameless	Union Jerry	Episode: "Which America?"
2020	Carmen Sandiego	Crawfish King, Waiter (voice)	Episode: "The Haunted Bayou Caper"
2020–present	The Simpsons	Carl Carlson, Officer Lou (voices)	Replacing Hank Azaria
2022	A League of Their Own	Edgar	Recurring cast
2022	Women of the Movement	Dr. Theodore Roosevelt Howard	4 episodes
2022	Chicago Fire	John Millard	Episode: "Angry Is Easier"

=== Video games ===
Year	Title	Role	Notes
2006	Tomb Raider: Legend	Zip	
2008	Tomb Raider: Underworld	Zip	
2009	Eat Lead: The Return of Matt Hazard	Sonny Tang, Space Marine	
2011	Saints Row: The Third	Zimos	
2012	Avengers Initiative	Nick Fury	
2013	StarCraft II: Heart of the Swarm	Tempest	
2013	Saints Row IV	Zimos	Enter the Dominatrix DLC
2017	Quake Champions	Sorlag	
2018	World of Warcraft: Battle for Azeroth	Bwonsamdi	
2018	Artifact	Farvhan the Draemer	
2020	Mafia: Definitive Edition	Additional Voices	Credited as Alex Desert
2020	World of Warcraft: Shadowlands	Bwonsamdi, Invisible Sister	
2025	Fortnite Battle Royale	Carl Carlson	
