= Momma Named Me Sheriff =

American adult animated sitcom

- Genre: Adult animation; Animated sitcom; Dark comedy
- Created by: Will Carsola; Dave Stewart
- Written by: Will Carsola; Dave Stewart; Sean Conroy (season 1); Jacob Young (season 2)
- Directed by: Will Carsola; Mark Brooks; Frank Marino; Rich Wilkie; Zac Palladino
- Voices of: Brooke Shields; Dave Stewart; Frank Collison; Jay Johnston; Kaitlyn Robrock; Will Carsola
- Theme music composer: Restavrant
- Country of origin: United States
- Original language: English
- No. of seasons: 2
- No. of episodes: 18

Production
- Executive producers: Will Carsola; Dave Stewart; Michael J. Rizzo; Keith Crofford; Walter Newman
- Producers: Michael J. Rizzo; Ollie Green; Sean Conroy; Jacob Young
- Editor: Will Carsola
- Running time: 11 minutes; 22 minutes ("Neighborhood Knight Watch")
- Production companies: HotHouse Productions; Day by Day Productions; Williams Street

Original release
- Network: Adult Swim
- Release: November 18, 2019 – March 15, 2021

Related
- Mr. Pickles

Momma Named Me Sheriff is an American adult animated sitcom created by Will Carsola and Dave Stewart for Cartoon Network's nighttime programming block Adult Swim. The show serves as a spin-off/sequel series to Mr. Pickles and focuses on Old Town's dimwitted Sheriff. The show premiered on Adult Swim on November 18, 2019, unannounced and disguised as an episode of Mr. Pickles, right after the airing of the latter's series finale. The show was renewed for a second season and premiered on February 15, 2021.

== Plot ==
A childish sheriff, whose name happens to be "Sheriff" patrols Old Town while having misadventures. He is joined by Stanley Goodman who now works as the Deputy.

== Characters ==
- Will Carsola as Sheriff, Boss and Deer Hunter #1
- Dave Stewart as Floyd, Linda, Dispatch, and Deer Hunter #2
- Kaitlyn Robrock as Tommy Goodman, Candy
- Brooke Shields as Beverly Goodman
- Jay Johnston as Stanley Goodman
- Frank Collison as Henry Gobbleblobber
- Alex Désert as Mr. Bojenkins

== Episodes ==
Season	Episodes	Originally released	
Season	Episodes	First released	Last released
1	9	November 18, 2019	December 16, 2019
2	9	February 15, 2021	March 15, 2021

=== Season 1 (2019) ===
No. overall	No. in season	Title	Directed by	Original release date	U.S. viewers (millions)
1	1	"Hats"	Will Carsola	November 18, 2019	0.557
2	2	"Smelly Glenn"	Mark Brooks	November 25, 2019	0.772
3	3	"Stuck"	Mark Brooks	November 25, 2019	0.646
4	4	"Ganley Stoodman"	Mark Brooks	December 2, 2019	0.675
5	5	"Bald Boyz"	Mark Brooks	December 2, 2019	0.632
6	6	"TV"	Mark Brooks	December 9, 2019	0.811
7	7	"Sunday Man"	Mark Brooks	December 9, 2019	0.720
8	8	"Chili Snakes"	Frank Marino	December 16, 2019	0.578
9	9	"Finale"	Frank Marino	December 16, 2019	0.488

=== Season 2 (2021) ===
No. overall	No. in season	Title	Directed by	Original release date	U.S. viewers (millions)
10	1	"Charter"	Rich Wilkie	February 15, 2021	0.313
11	2	"Good Guys"	Zac Palladino	February 15, 2021	0.275
12	3	"Sheriff and Roach"	Zac Palladino	February 22, 2021	0.353
13	4	"Bad Parents"	Zac Palladino	February 22, 2021	0.301
14	5	"Puddin"	Rich Wilkie	March 1, 2021	0.454
15	6	"Membership"	Rich Wilkie	March 1, 2021	0.368
16	7	"Election"	Rich Wilkie	March 8, 2021	0.350
17	8	"The Case of Sad, Sad, Sheriff"	Andy Maxwell	March 8, 2021	0.309
18	9	"Neighborhood Knight Watch"	Zac Palladino	March 15, 2021	0.379
