= Melanie Lynskey filmography =

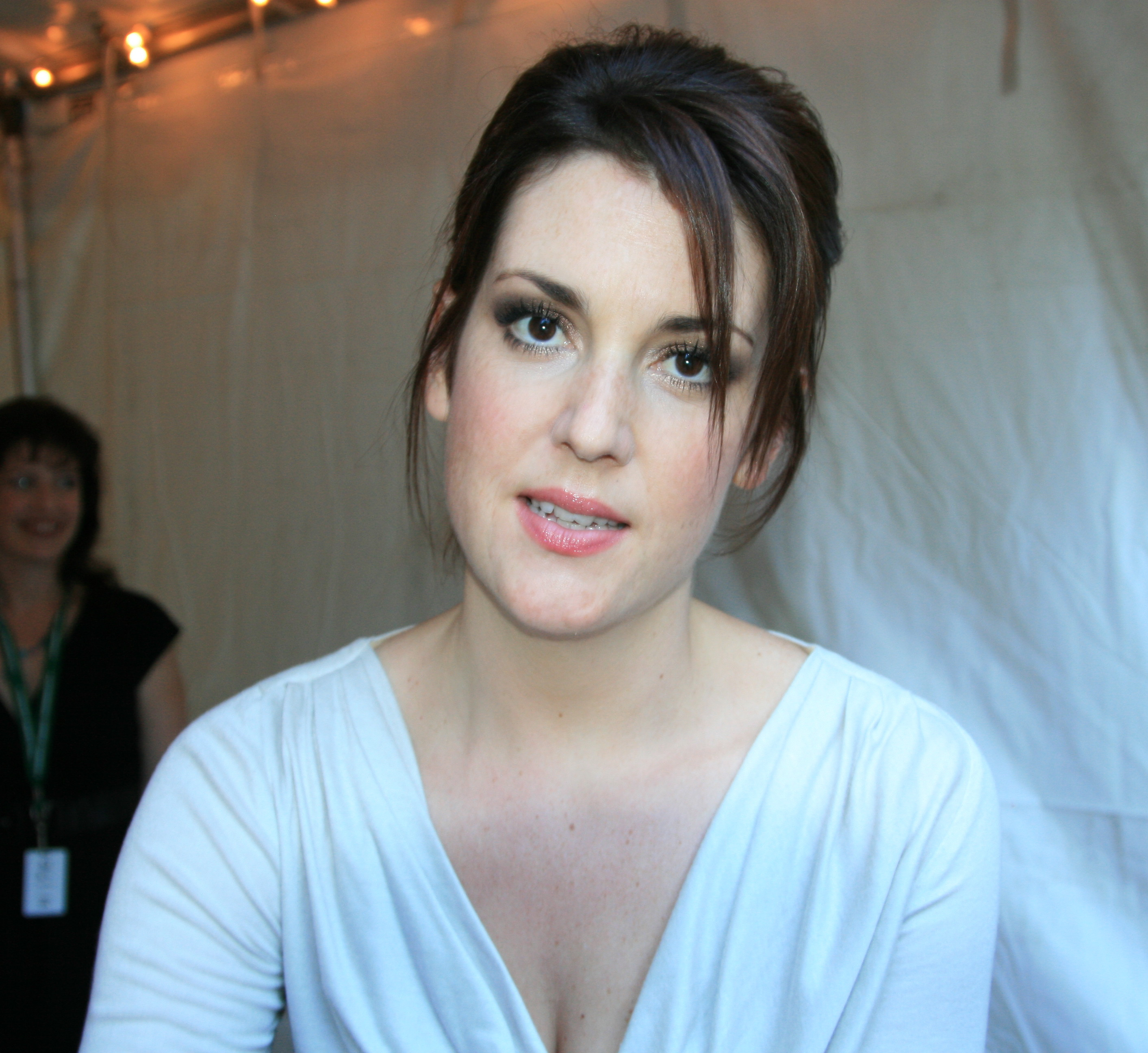
Lynskey at the 2009 Toronto International Film Festival

New Zealand actress Melanie Lynskey made her film debut in 1994 when she played teenage murderer Pauline Parker in Heavenly Creatures, a crime drama directed by Peter Jackson. Following a hiatus, she resumed her career with a supporting role in the fairytale romance Ever After (1998), and spent the next few years appearing in a variety of big-budget and small-scale features, such as Detroit Rock City, But I'm a Cheerleader (both 1999), Coyote Ugly (2000), Snakeskin (2001), Abandon (2002), and the commercially successful romantic comedy Sweet Home Alabama (2002).

Lynskey appeared as Rose, the conniving love interest of Charlie Harper, on the CBS sitcom Two and a Half Men between 2003 and 2015. During this time she played supporting parts in Shattered Glass (2003), Clint Eastwood's Flags of Our Fathers (2006), Sam Mendes's Away We Go, Jason Reitman's Up in the Air, Steven Soderbergh's The Informant! (all 2009), Win Win (2011), and The Perks of Being a Wallflower (2012). Her starring role as a depressed divorcee in Hello I Must Be Going (2012) proved to be a turning point in Lynskey's career, with headline parts in dramedies such as Happy Christmas, Goodbye to All That (both 2014) and The Intervention (2016) coming next, establishing her as a prominent figure on the American independent film scene. For her portrayal of a disgruntled vigilante in the 2017 thriller I Don't Feel at Home in This World Anymore, she was nominated for the Gotham Award for Best Actress.

Lynskey starred as a conflicted housewife on HBO's Togetherness from 2015 to 2016, earning praise and a Critics' Choice nomination. She then appeared as an ambitious defence lawyer in the Australian drama series Sunshine (2017), a troubled psychic on Hulu's Castle Rock (2018), a conservative activist in the FX miniseries Mrs. America (2020), and real-life murder victim Betty Gore in the Hulu miniseries Candy (2022). Her transition to mainstream success continued with her role as a put-upon wife in the 2021 film Don't Look Up, as well as her portrayal of Shauna, a secretive plane crash survivor, on the Showtime thriller series Yellowjackets (2021–present), for which she won the 2022 Critics' Choice Award for Best Actress and was nominated twice for the Emmy Award for Outstanding Lead Actress (2022; 2023). She received a further Emmy nomination (Outstanding Guest Actress, 2023) for her role as a ruthless war criminal on the first season of HBO's The Last of Us.

== Film ==
Year	Title	Role	Notes
1994	Heavenly Creatures	Pauline Parker	
1996	The Frighteners	Deputy	
1998	Ever After	Jacqueline	
1999	Foreign Correspondents	Melody	
1999	Detroit Rock City	Beth	
1999	But I'm a Cheerleader	Hilary	
1999	The Cherry Orchard	Dunyasha	
1999	Measureless to Man	Unknown	Short film
2000	Coyote Ugly	Gloria	
2001	Snakeskin	Alice	
2002	Shooters	Marie	
2002	Abandon	Mousy Julie	Credited as Melanie Jayne Lynskey
2002	Sweet Home Alabama	Lurlynn	
2003	Claustrophobia	Lauren	
2003	Shattered Glass	Amy Brand	
2004	The Nearly Unadventurous Life of Zoe Cadwaulder	Zoe Cadwaulder	Short film
2005	Say Uncle	Susan	
2006	Park	Sheryl	
2006	Flags of Our Fathers	Pauline Harnois	
2007	Itty Bitty Titty Committee	Plastic Surgery Lady	Uncredited
2008	Show of Hands	Jess	
2008	A Quiet Little Marriage	Monique	
2009	Away We Go	Munch	
2009	Up in the Air	Julie Bingham	
2009	The Informant!	Ginger Whitacre	
2009	Leaves of Grass	Colleen	
2010	Helena from the Wedding	Alice	
2011	Win Win	Cindy	
2011	Touchback	Macy	
2012	Hello I Must Be Going	Amy	
2012	Eye of the Hurricane	Amelia Kyte	
2012	Seeking a Friend for the End of the World	Karen	
2012	The Perks of Being a Wallflower	Aunt Helen	
2012	Putzel	Sally	
2013	The Big Ask	Hannah	
2014	Happy Christmas	Kelly	
2014	They Came Together	Brenda	
2014	Chu and Blossom	Miss Shoemaker	
2014	We'll Never Have Paris	Devon	
2014	Goodbye to All That	Annie Wall	
2015	Digging for Fire	Squiggy	
2016	The Intervention	Annie	
2016	Rainbow Time	Lindsay	
2016	The Great & the Small	Margaret	
2016	Little Boxes	Gina McNulty-Burns	
2016	Folk Hero & Funny Guy	Becky	
2017	I Don't Feel at Home in This World Anymore	Ruth	
2017	XX	Mary	Segment: "The Birthday Party"
2017	1 Mile to You	Coach Rowan	
2017	And Then I Go	Janice	
2017	The Changeover	Kate Chant	
2018	Sadie	Rae	
2021	Lady of the Manor	Hannah	
2021	Don't Look Up	June Mindy	
2024	Griffin in Summer	Helen	
2024	Over the Garden Wall: 10th Anniversary Tribute	Beatrice (voice)	Short film
2025	Pike River	Anna Osborne	Also executive producer
2026	Don't Say Good Luck	Elizabeth Birenbaum	

Key
†	Denotes films that have not yet been released

== Television ==
Year	Title	Role	Notes
2002	Rose Red	Rachel Wheaton	Main cast; 3 episodes
2003	The Shield	Marcy	2 episodes
2003–2015	Two and a Half Men	Rose	Series regular (2003–2005), recurring thereafter; 63 episodes
2007	Drive	Wendy Patrakas	Main cast; 6 episodes
2008	Comanche Moon	Pearl Coleman	Main cast; 3 episodes
2008	Psych	Emily Bloom	Episode: "Black and Tan: A Crime of Fashion"
2008	The L Word	Clea Mason	2 episodes
2009	It's Always Sunny in Philadelphia	Kate	Episode: "The Gang Exploits the Mortgage Crisis"
2010	Memphis Beat	Annaliese Jones	Episode: "Polk Salad Annie"
2010–2012	The Life & Times of Tim	Becky (voice)	Recurring; 6 episodes
2012	House	Natalie Tavares	Episode: "Better Half"
2014	Over the Garden Wall	Beatrice (voice)	Main cast; 8 episodes
2014–2015	Jake and the Never Land Pirates	Pearl (voice)	2 episodes
2015–2016	Togetherness	Michelle Pierson	Main role; 16 episodes
2015	Key & Peele	Fiancée	Episode: "The Job Interview"
2016–2018	Future-Worm!	Megan; Madeline Madison (voice)	Series regular; 13 episodes
2016	Animals	Linda (voice)	Episode: "Squirrels"
2016	Our Ex-Wife	Sara	Main cast; pilot
2017	American Dad!	Sharon (voice)	Episode: "A Whole Slotta Love"
2017	Girlboss	Gail	Recurring; 3 episodes
2017	Wet Hot American Summer: Ten Years Later	Laura	2 episodes
2017	Sunshine	Zara Skelton	Main role; 4 episodes
2018	Summer Camp Island	Sun (voice)	Recurring; 3 episodes
2018	Castle Rock	Molly Strand	Main role; 10 episodes
2019	Easy	Beth	Episode: "Blank Pages"
2020	Mrs. America	Rosemary Thomson	Main cast; 9 episodes
2021	Young Sheldon	Professor Dora Ericson	2 episodes
2021	Mom	Shannon	Episode: "My Kinda People and the Big To-Do"
2021–present	Yellowjackets	Shauna Sadecki (née Shipman)	Main role; 39 episodes
2022	Candy	Betty Gore	Main role; 5 episodes
2023	The Last of Us	Kathleen Coghlan	2 episodes
2023	HouseBroken	Pinky; Memory Sheep (voice)	Recurring; 3 episodes
2024	The Tattooist of Auschwitz	Heather Morris	Main role; 6 episodes
2025	Poker Face	Regina Gilvary	Episode: "The Sleazy Georgian"
2025	Matlock	Debra Palmer	Recurring; 3 episodes

Key
†	Denotes television productions that have not yet been released

== Podcasts ==
Year	Title	Role(s)	Notes
2014–2016	The Thrilling Adventure Hour	Various	6 episodes
2016	The Worst Idea of All Time	Roxanne / Mom / Malcolm / Paddy Schwarz	1 episode

== Music videos ==
Year	Song	Artist	Notes
2006	"Mousey"	Goodshirt	Directed by Jimmi Simpson
2015	"Waiting on Love"	Nicki Bluhm and The Gramblers	Directed by Todd Hurvitz
2015	"Team Ball Player Thing"	#KiwisCureBatten	Directed by Taika Waititi and Jesse Griffin
