= List of awards and nominations received by Melanie Lynskey =

Melanie Lynskey awards and nominations
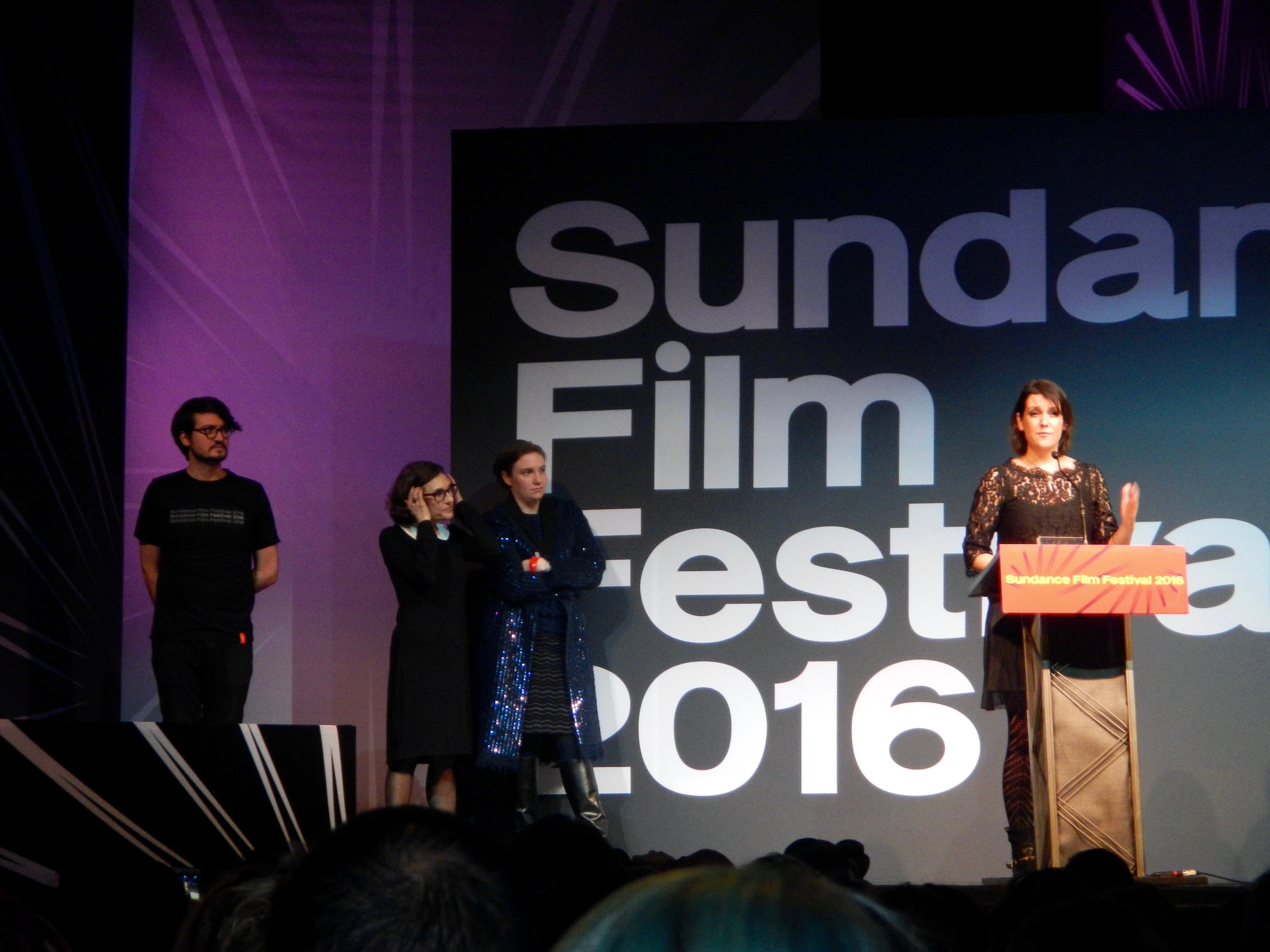
- Lynskey accepting her Special Jury Award for The Intervention (2016) at the Sundance Film Festival
Awards and nominations
Award	Wins	Nominations
Primetime Emmy Awards	0	3
Screen Actors Guild Awards	0	1
Satellite Awards	0	2
Critics Choice Association	3	7
Independent Spirit Awards	0	1
Gotham Awards	0	3

Totals (Note: Certain award groups do not simply award one winner. They acknowledge several different recipients, have runners-up, and have third place. Since this is a specific recognition and is different from losing an award, runner-up mentions are considered wins in this award tally. For simplification and to avoid errors, each award in this list has been presumed to have had a prior nomination.)
- Wins: 24
- Nominations: 51

The following is a list of awards and nominations received by New Zealand actress Melanie Lynskey. Since winning her first accolade (Best Actress, 1995) at the New Zealand Film Awards for her portrayal of Pauline Parker in Heavenly Creatures, Lynskey has received various awards for her work in film and on television, including three Critics' Choice Awards, a HCA Award, a Gracie, a Hollywood Film Award and a Sundance Special Jury Award, as well as nominations for three Primetime Emmys, three Gothams, two Satellite Awards, an Independent Spirit Award, one Golden Nymph, and one Screen Actors Guild Award.

Lynskey was nominated for the 2015 Critics' Choice Award for Best Supporting Actress for her work on HBO's Togetherness. She won the 2022 Critics' Choice Award for Best Actress in a Drama Series for playing Shauna on Showtime's Yellowjackets, and later earned two Primetime Emmy nominations (Lead Actress in a Drama Series; 2022, 2023) for the same role. She received another Critics' Choice nomination (Supporting Actress in a Miniseries, 2023) for co-starring as Betty Gore in Candy, and a further Emmy nomination (Guest Actress in a Drama Series, 2023) for her role as Kathleen on the first season of HBO's The Last of Us.

== Major associations ==
Primetime Emmy Awards
Year	Nominated work	Category	Result	Ref.
2022	Yellowjackets	Outstanding Lead Actress in a Drama Series	Nominated	
2023	Yellowjackets	Outstanding Lead Actress in a Drama Series	Nominated	
2023	The Last of Us (Episode: "Endure and Survive")	Outstanding Guest Actress in a Drama Series	Nominated	

Screen Actors Guild Awards
Year	Nominated work	Category	Result	Ref.
2022	Don't Look Up	Outstanding Performance by a Cast in a Motion Picture (shared with the cast)	Nominated	

== Critics awards ==
Central Ohio Film Critics Association
Year	Nominated work	Category	Result	Ref.
2010	Up in the Air	Best Ensemble (shared with the cast)	Nominated	

Critics' Choice Super Awards
Year	Nominated work	Category	Result	Ref.
2022	Yellowjackets	Best Actress in a Horror Series	Won	
2024	The Last of Us	Best Villain in a Series, Limited Series or Made-For-TV Movie	Won	
2024	Yellowjackets	Best Actress in a Horror Series, Limited Series or Made-For-TV Movie	Nominated	
2025	Yellowjackets	Best Actress in a Horror Series, Limited Series or Made-For-TV Movie	Nominated	

Critics' Choice Television Awards
Year	Nominated work	Category	Result	Ref.
2015	Togetherness	Best Supporting Actress in a Comedy Series	Nominated	
2022	Yellowjackets	Best Actress in a Drama Series	Won	
2023	Candy	Best Supporting Actress in a Limited Series or Movie Made for Television	Nominated	

Denver Film Critics Society
Year	Nominated work	Category	Result	Ref.
2010	Up in the Air	Best Acting Ensemble (shared with the cast)	Nominated	

Dorian Awards
Year	Nominated work	Category	Result	Ref.
2022	Yellowjackets	Best TV Performance	Won	
2023	Yellowjackets	Best TV Performance – Drama	Nominated	

Hollywood Creative Alliance
Year	Nominated work	Category	Result	Ref.
2022	Yellowjackets	Best Actress in a Broadcast Network or Cable Series – Drama	Won	
2022	Candy	Best Supporting Actress in a Streaming Limited or Anthology Series	Nominated	
2023	Yellowjackets	Best Actress in a Broadcast Network or Cable Series – Drama	Nominated	
2023	The Last of Us	Best Guest Actress in a Drama Series	Nominated	
2025	Yellowjackets	Best Actress in a Drama Series	Nominated	

San Diego Film Critics Society Awards
Year	Nominated work	Category	Result	Ref.
2012	The Perks of Being a Wallflower	Best Performance by an Ensemble (shared with the cast)	Won	

TCA Awards
Year	Nominated work	Category	Result	Ref.
2022	Yellowjackets	Individual Achievement in Drama	Nominated	

Washington D.C. Area Film Critics Association Awards
Year	Nominated work	Category	Result	Ref.
2009	Up in the Air	Best Ensemble (shared with the cast)	Nominated	

== Festival awards ==
Chicago Alt.Film Fest
Year	Nominated work	Category	Result	Ref.
1999	Foreign Correspondents	Best Actress	Nominated	

Fargo Film Festival
Year	Nominated work	Category	Result	Ref.
2014	Putzel	Best Actress	Nominated	

Monte-Carlo Television Festival
Year	Nominated work	Category	Result	Ref.
2018	Sunshine	Outstanding Actress (Long Fiction Program)	Nominated	

Newport Beach TV Fest
Year	Nominated work	Category	Result	Ref.
2025	Yellowjackets	Outstanding Drama Ensemble (shared with the cast)	Won	

Sundance Film Festival
Year	Nominated work	Category	Result	Ref.
2016	The Intervention	Individual Performance	Won	

== Miscellaneous awards ==
"An Irish Person" TV Awards
Year	Nominated work	Category	Result	Ref.
2022	Yellowjackets	Outstanding Leading Actress in a Drama Series	Won	
2022	Yellowjackets	Outstanding Ensemble in a Drama Series (shared with the cast)	Won	

Autostraddle TV Awards
Year	Nominated work	Category	Result	Ref.
2022	Yellowjackets	Outstanding Performance by a Straight Actress in a Straight Role	Nominated	
2023	Yellowjackets	Outstanding Performance by a Straight Actress in a Straight Role	Won	

Awards Circuit Community Awards
Year	Nominated work	Category	Result	Ref.
2009	Up in the Air	Best Cast Ensemble (shared with the cast)	Runner-up	
2012	The Perks of Being a Wallflower	Best Cast Ensemble (shared with the cast)	Nominated	

Awards Daily Cooler Awards
Year	Nominated work	Category	Result	Ref.
2022	Yellowjackets	Outstanding Actress in a Drama Series	Won	
2023	Yellowjackets	Outstanding Actress in a Drama Series	Nominated	

Behind the Voice Actors Awards
Year	Nominated work	Category	Result	Ref.
2014	Over the Garden Wall	Best Vocal Ensemble in a New Television Series (People's Choice) (shared with the cast)	Won	
2014	Over the Garden Wall	Best Vocal Ensemble in a New Television Series (shared with the cast)	Nominated	
2014	Over the Garden Wall	Best Female Lead Vocal Performance in a Television Series – Comedy/Musical	Nominated	

CinEuphoria Awards
Year	Nominated work	Category	Result	Ref.
2011	Away We Go	Best Supporting Actress – International Competition	Won	

Gold Derby Awards
Year	Nominated work	Category	Result	Ref.
2010	Up in the Air	Ensemble Cast (shared with the cast)	Nominated	
2022	Don't Look Up	Best Ensemble (shared with the cast)	Nominated	
2022	Yellowjackets	Best Actress – Drama	Nominated	
2023	Yellowjackets	Best Actress – Drama	Nominated	
2023	The Last of Us	Best Guest Actress – Drama	Nominated	
2026	Matlock	Best Guest Actress – Drama	Nominated	

Gotham Independent Film Awards
Year	Nominated work	Category	Result	Ref.
2012	Hello I Must Be Going	Breakthrough Actor	Nominated	
2017	I Don't Feel at Home in This World Anymore	Best Actress	Nominated	
2022	Yellowjackets	Outstanding Performance in a New Series	Nominated	

Gracie Awards
Year	Nominated work	Category	Result	Ref.
2022	Yellowjackets	Actress in a Leading Role – Drama	Won	

Independent Spirit Awards
Year	Nominated work	Category	Result	Ref.
2023	Yellowjackets	Best Female Performance in a New Scripted Series	Nominated	

International Online Cinema Awards
Year	Nominated work	Category	Result	Ref.
2022	Yellowjackets	Best Actress in a Drama Series	Won	

Just About Write Awards
Year	Nominated work	Category	Result	Ref.
2022	Yellowjackets	Outstanding Lead Actress – Drama	Nominated	
2023	Yellowjackets	Outstanding Lead Performance – Drama	3rd place	

Lady Parts TV Awards
Year	Nominated work	Category	Result	Ref.
2022	Yellowjackets	Best Supporting Actress in a Drama Series	Nominated	

New Zealand Film and Television Awards
Year	Nominated work	Category	Result	Ref.
1995	Heavenly Creatures	Best Actress	Won	
2001	Snakeskin	Best Actress	Nominated	
2009	Show of Hands	Best Lead Actress in a Feature Film	Nominated	
2026	Pike River	Best Performance by an Actor in a Female Role: Feature	Nominated	

Online Film & Television Association
Year	Nominated work	Category	Result	Ref.
2022	Yellowjackets	Best Actress in a Drama Series	Won	
2023	Yellowjackets	Best Actress in a Drama Series	Nominated	
2023	The Last of Us	Best Guest Actress in a Drama Series	Nominated	

Pena de Prata
Year	Nominated work	Category	Result	Ref.
2022	Yellowjackets	Best Lead Acting in a Drama Series	Nominated	
2022	Yellowjackets	Best Ensemble in a Drama Series (shared with the cast)	Nominated	

Satellite Awards
Year	Nominated work	Category	Result	Ref.
2023	Candy	Best Supporting Actress – Series, Miniseries or Television Film	Nominated	
2024	Yellowjackets	Best Actress – Television Series Drama	Nominated	

Saturn Awards
Year	Nominated work	Category	Result	Ref.
2022	Yellowjackets	Best Actress in a Network/Cable Series	Nominated	

Tell-Tale TV Awards
Year	Nominated work	Category	Result	Ref.
2023	Yellowjackets	Favorite Performer in a Cable or Streaming Drama Series	Nominated	
2024	Yellowjackets	Favorite Performer in a Cable or Streaming Drama Series	Nominated	

Visa Entertainment Screen Awards
Year	Nominated work	Category	Result	Ref.
2010	The Informant!	Best New Zealand Actress in a Film	Nominated	

== Honours ==
CinEuphoria Awards
Year	Nominee	Category	Result	Ref.
2024	Melanie Lynskey	Merit – Honorary Award (shared with the cast of The Last of Us)	Won	

Hollywood Film Awards
Year	Nominee	Category	Result	Ref.
2009	Melanie Lynskey	Spotlight Award	Won	

Miami Film Festival
Year	Nominee	Category	Result	Ref.
2025	Melanie Lynskey	Precious Gem Award	Won	

RiverRun International Film Festival
Year	Nominee	Category	Result	Ref.
2014	Melanie Lynskey	Emerging Master	Won	

Visa Entertainment Screen Awards
Year	Nominee	Category	Result	Ref.
2010	Melanie Lynskey	Best New Zealand Export	Nominated	
