= Melanie Lynskey =

New Zealand actress (born 1977)

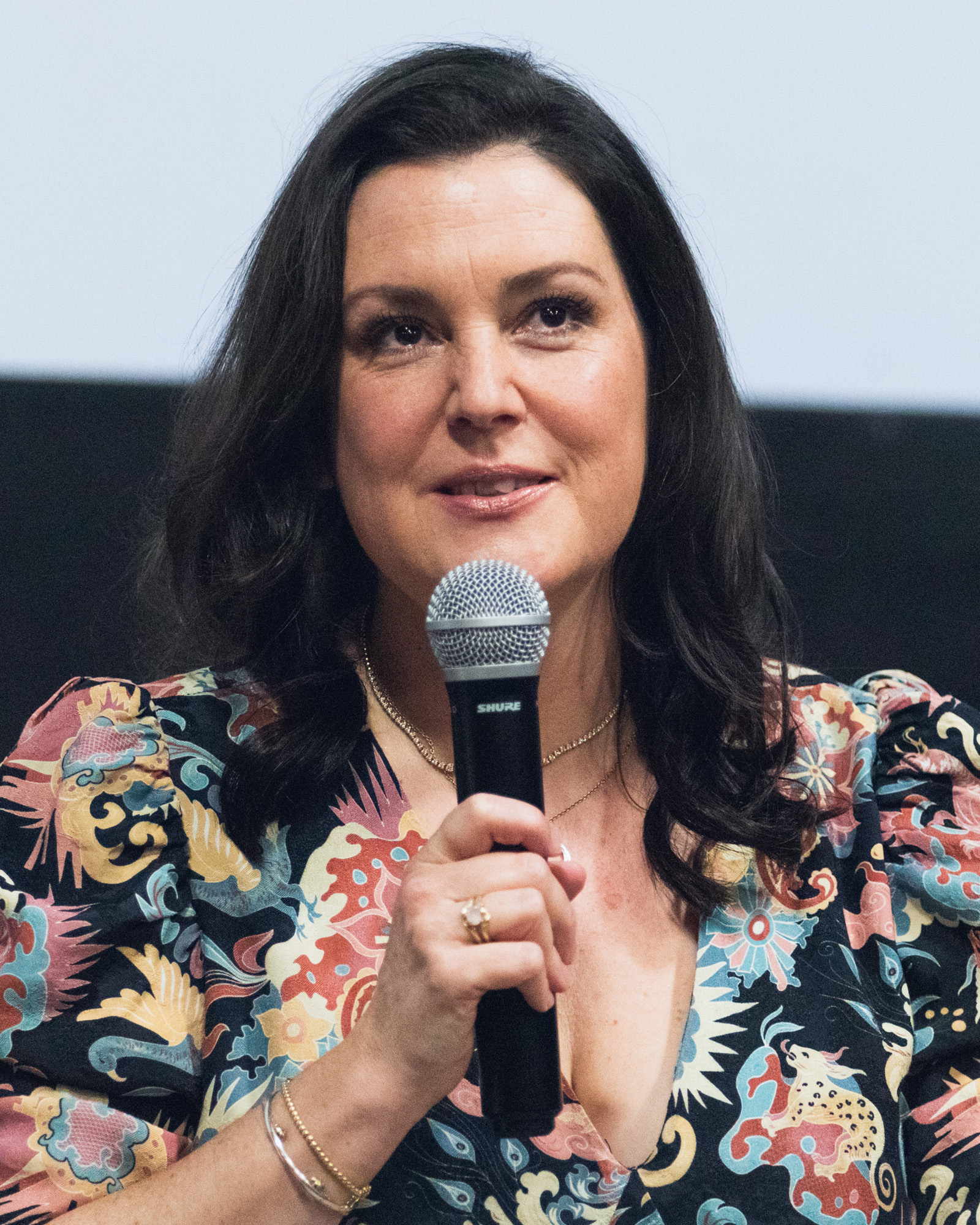
- Lynskey in 2025
- Born: Melanie Jayne Lynskey; 16 May 1977 (age 49); New Plymouth, New Zealand
- Education: Victoria University of Wellington
- Occupation: Actress
- Years active: 1994–present
- Works: Full list
- Spouses: Jimmi Simpson (m. 2007; div. 2014) Jason Ritter (m. 2021)
- Children: 1
- Awards: Full list

Melanie Jayne Lynskey (/ˈlɪnski/ LIN-skee; born 16 May 1977) is a New Zealand actress. Known for her portrayals of complex women and her command of American accents, she works predominantly in independent films and television. She is the recipient of numerous accolades, including three Critics' Choice Awards and nominations for three Primetime Emmy Awards.

Lynskey made her film debut at age 17 portraying Pauline Parker in Heavenly Creatures (1994). She went on to establish herself as a character actress through supporting parts in Ever After (1998); But I'm a Cheerleader (1999); Coyote Ugly (2000); Sweet Home Alabama (2002); Shattered Glass (2003); Flags of Our Fathers (2006); Away We Go; Up in the Air; The Informant! (all 2009); Win Win (2011); The Perks of Being a Wallflower (2012); and Don't Look Up (2021). Her starring role in Hello I Must Be Going (2012) proved to be a turning point in Lynskey's career, with subsequent lead parts in Happy Christmas (2014), The Intervention (2016), and I Don't Feel at Home in This World Anymore (2017) highlighting her as a prominent figure in independent cinema.

On television, Lynskey played the recurring role of Rose on Two and a Half Men (2003–2015). Her other credits include Togetherness (2015–2016) and Castle Rock (2018), as well as the miniseries Mrs. America (2020) and Candy (2022). Since 2021, she has starred as Shauna on Yellowjackets, winning the 2022 Critics' Choice Award for Best Actress and being nominated twice for the Primetime Emmy Award for Outstanding Lead Actress (2022; 2023). For her portrayal of Kathleen on the first season of The Last of Us (2023), Lynskey received another Emmy nomination.

== Early life and education ==
Melanie Jayne Lynskey was born on 16 May 1977 in New Plymouth, New Zealand, to Kay Barbara (née Mahoney), a real estate agent, and Tim Lynskey, an orthopaedic surgeon. She has Irish, English, and Scottish ancestry; her surname originates in Ireland. Lynskey played an active role in the raising of her siblings; she is the eldest of five children, and has three brothers and one sister. She was raised in the Baptist faith.

When she was six, Lynskey's family moved to England for one year before returning to New Zealand. She recalls moving "a lot" due to her father's profession: "My dad was a medical student when I was born, so he was studying and going to different universities. And then he was doing his residency, so I was always the new kid in school." She later attended New Plymouth Girls' High School, where she was involved in the drama department and school plays. She has spoken about being shy at school and finding comfort in acting: "It was so freeing, having someone give me the words to say and not being myself for a minute. It just felt like a weight was lifted off my shoulders." After graduating high school, Lynskey studied for a year and a half at Victoria University of Wellington, majoring in English literature, but dropped out to focus on her film career.

== Career ==
=== 1994–2002: Film debut and early work ===
Lynskey's professional debut came at age 15 with a starring role in Heavenly Creatures, a psychological drama based on a 1950s murder case. Lynskey portrayed Pauline Parker, a schoolgirl who conspires to kill her mother. She auditioned for the role when a casting director visited her high school; prior to this, five hundred girls had been considered for the part, but "none were right". Fran Walsh, who co-wrote the screenplay, admired Lynskey's "quiet intensity" and said, "We knew immediately that she was right for the role". Lynskey turned 16 during the making of Heavenly Creatures and was 17 by the time of its release in 1994. Critics were effusive about the performances, especially those of Lynskey and her co-star, Kate Winslet. Roger Ebert complimented the film's director, Peter Jackson, on picking "the right two actresses", noting that "There is a way Lynskey has of looking up from beneath glowering eyebrows that lets you know her insides are churning", while Richard Corliss wrote in his review for Time:

The film's serendipitous stroke was to find Winslet and, especially, Lynskey, a first-time actress. They are perfect, fearless in embodying teenage hysteria. They declaim their lines with an intensity that approaches ecstasy, as if reading aloud from Wuthering Heights. The giggles that punctuate the girls' early friendship are not beneath Winslet and Lynskey. The screams that end the film are not beyond them.

Heavenly Creatures is recognised as a milestone in New Zealand cinema. It was nominated for the Academy Award for Best Original Screenplay, while Lynskey was named Best Actress at the 1995 New Zealand Film Awards. She regards working with Jackson and Winslet as an important learning experience. She grew particularly close to Winslet during filming, who later told The Irish Times, "Mel is like the left side of my body. [We] had the exact relationship in terms of communication and love that Pauline and Juliet had. From the minute we saw each other." Despite the film's success, its creators tried to discourage Lynskey from pursuing a full-time acting career, as it was not thought to be realistic. She later revealed, "[People were] looking out for me [...] 'Thanks for doing this movie for us, and now be sure that you go to university and get a normal job.' No one wanted to be responsible for me being like, 'I'm gonna run off to Hollywood!' [...] New Zealanders are very practical. Everybody was kind of like, 'That was fun [but] it's not what your life is gonna be.'"

Over the next three years, Lynskey continued her education while auditioning for various film parts. She also had a minor role as a policewoman in Peter Jackson's first project after Heavenly Creatures, The Frighteners (1996), and starred in a production of Jean Genet's The Maids for the New Zealand Fringe Festival. Her return to substantial film roles came with the independent drama Foreign Correspondents, where she played Melody, a timid receptionist who strikes up an unusual bond with an overseas pen pal. The director, Mark Tapio Kines, contacted Lynskey to offer her the part after reading online that she was eager to work in America. Filming took place in Los Angeles in 1997, with the project drawing attention for its "breakthrough" use of crowdfunding. Her next film was the period fairytale romance Ever After (1998), a feminist reimagining of Cinderella that was shot in the south of France; Lynskey played Drew Barrymore's "charming and funny" stepsister, Jacqueline De Ghent. She attributes her growth in self-confidence around this time, as well as the advancement of her career, to the support and advice she received from Barrymore and their co-star, Anjelica Huston, during the making of the film.

Lynskey appeared in four features in 1999: teen comedy Detroit Rock City, period drama The Cherry Orchard, British gangster drama Shooters, and the cult hit satire But I'm a Cheerleader—considered to be one of the foremost examples of LGBTQ cinema—where she played a lesbian undergoing conversion therapy. Next, she wore "big hair and fake nails" to portray Gloria, a girl from New Jersey, in the musical romantic comedy Coyote Ugly (2000), with Salon's Stephanie Zacharek calling her "a bridge-and-tunnel Betty Boop, full of google-eyed charm". She then returned to New Zealand to star in the independent thriller Snakeskin (2001), which premiered at the Cannes Film Festival and earned Lynskey a Best Actress nomination at that year's New Zealand Film Awards. Variety's David Stratton felt that her work in Snakeskin, where she played Alice, a free-spirited drifter who embarks on a dangerous road trip, was "excellent".

In 2002, Lynskey re-teamed with director Andy Tennant—whom she previously worked with on Ever After—to play a key role in the romantic comedy Sweet Home Alabama, with The Austin Chronicle mentioning her as a highlight among the ensemble cast. The scene in which her character, Lurlynn, nurses her baby in a crowded bar has since been recognised for its cultural relevance. Next, she had a supporting role in Abandon, the directorial debut of Stephen Gaghan. In his review of the psychological thriller, Variety's Todd McCarthy pointed out that Lynskey did "some self-conscious scene stealing" with her portrayal of a mousy librarian. She made her television debut that same year in the Stephen King miniseries Rose Red, playing the protective older sister of a girl with supernatural powers.

=== 2003–2011: Two and a Half Men and continued film career ===
In Shattered Glass (2003), a drama depicting the downfall of disgraced ex-journalist Stephen Glass, Lynskey appeared as Amy Brand, a writer for The New Republic. Critic Andrew Sarris noted that "the performances [of] Ms. Sevigny, Ms. Dawson and Ms. Lynskey do more than [just] complement Mr. Christensen's central characterization; they provide a sane backdrop for [his] pathological deceptions to steadily unravel against". Later that year, she began playing the part of Rose, an endearingly devious stalker, on the CBS sitcom Two and a Half Men. Having initially made a one-off appearance in the pilot episode, she was invited by the producers to become a series regular and went on to feature in various storylines throughout the first two seasons. Worried about being typecast as a result of her involvement with the series, Lynskey decided to leave the main ensemble in 2005 to concentrate on film work, a move that showrunner Chuck Lorre said he had "a lot of respect for", despite "not [being] happy at first". She returned infrequently to Two and a Half Men as a guest star up until its final episode, which aired in February 2015. "Doing three or four episodes a year enabled me to pay my mortgage and do independent films", she later said. "People in [the indie world] didn't know I was on this huge sitcom. Then, [others] would recognise me from [the show] and think that I never had another job. But I couldn't have done one without the other."

Lynskey played Pauline Harnois, the fame-hungry fiancée of soldier Rene Gagnon, in Clint Eastwood's epic war film Flags of Our Fathers (2006). She then joined the main ensemble of the short-lived Fox series Drive (2007), with Los Angeles Times critic Mary McNamara describing her work as Wendy Patrakas, a new mother desperate to get away from her abusive husband, as "especially compelling". Her next project was the Western miniseries Comanche Moon, which aired on CBS in January 2008. In their critique of the show, People felt that Lynskey's portrayal of Pearl Coleman, a settler whose marriage falls apart after she is raped, was among the best in the cast. Later that year, she returned once again to New Zealand to headline the romantic drama Show of Hands, earning strong notices and a Best Actress nomination at the Qantas Film Awards for playing Jess, a single parent who enters a gruelling endurance competition to win a car.

In the Sam Mendes–directed dramedy Away We Go (2009), Lynskey appeared as Munch, an adoptive mother dealing with the effects of repeated pregnancy loss. The performance was roundly praised, with critics finding the moment her character performs a grief-stricken pole dance in front of her husband to be particularly poignant: writing for The Boston Globe, Wesley Morris stated, "Lynskey dramatizes sadness and dysfunction with quiet, moving physicality. [Her] whole life is there in her long face and drooping limbs. It's the best performance in the movie." She co-starred that same year as Ginger, the foolishly devoted wife of thieving whistleblower Mark Whitacre—played by Matt Damon—in Steven Soderbergh's darkly comedic biopic The Informant!. Writing for The Independent, Geoffrey Macnab felt that Lynskey provided "sterling support" to Damon. During promotion of the film in September that year, Soderbergh told the Los Angeles Times:

[Melanie] is so watchable. You never quite know what you're going to get, you just know it's going to be good. Her rhythms are really unusual, like her cadence and her reaction times to things, and the way she sort of lays out a sentence. It's just really, really interesting.

While making the film, Soderbergh discouraged Lynskey from contacting the real Ginger Whitacre, as he wanted Lynskey to reach her own conclusion about whether she had been complicit in her husband's crimes. "I decided she had no idea what was going on", she later said. "She was trusting, she [thought her job was] to stay in the house and take care of the kids [...] She wasn't asking too many questions." Lynskey counts her time working on The Informant! as one of her favourite professional experiences.

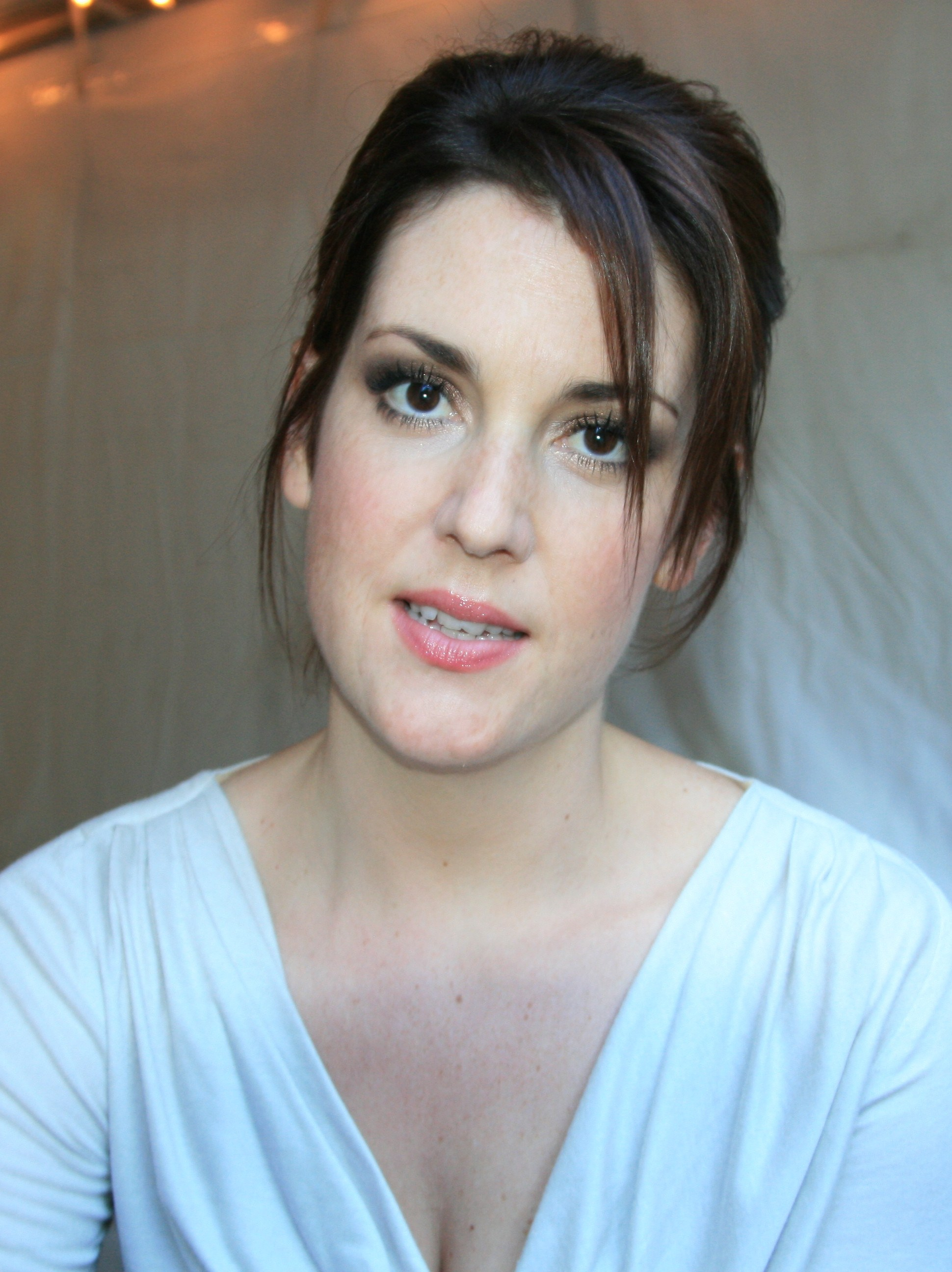
Lynskey promoting Up in the Air (2009) at the Toronto International Film Festival

Also in 2009, Lynskey appeared as the pregnant girlfriend of a cannabis farmer in Tim Blake Nelson's Leaves of Grass, with RogerEbert.com believing her performance to be one of the key contributors to the black comedy's "quirky charm". Nelson said of her casting, "Melanie came in and read for me and, though she's from New Zealand, she was by far the most credible version of an Oklahoma girl I saw. And I probably auditioned 50 actresses for that role". Next, she received positive notices for her work as Julie Bingham, a soon-to-be bride, in the Oscar-nominated dramedy Up in the Air. With his previous films, director Jason Reitman had always rejected the idea of casting non-American actors in American roles, but Lynskey said that she "tricked" him into giving her the part by avoiding conversation with him during her audition, thus concealing her real accent; Reitman later admitted to being "thrilled" by this. In October 2009, she was presented with a Spotlight Award at the Hollywood Film Festival.

Lynskey played an insecure wife in Helena from the Wedding (2010), with The Hollywood Reporter stating in their review, "The actors form a seamless ensemble, but [the film] belongs to [Lynskey]". She then appeared in the sports drama Touchback (2011), receiving praise for her role as the childhood sweetheart of an ex-football prodigy, and garnered positive notices the same year for her portrayal of drug addict Cindy Timmons in Tom McCarthy's dramedy Win Win. Writing for The Hollywood Reporter, David Rooney noted that Lynskey brought "welcome soft shadings to the story's disruptive element", while Mary Pols stated in her review for Time, "[Lynskey] has become one of the most reliably intriguing supporting actresses in film [...] she had small parts in Away We Go, The Informant! and Up in the Air [and] was wonderful in all three. In Win Win she gives a very different kind of performance and is even better."

=== 2012–2020: Transition to leading roles ===
In 2012, Lynskey appeared briefly as the flirtatious Karen in doomsday romantic comedy Seeking a Friend for the End of the World and had a key role as Aunt Helen, the sexually abusive relative of the teenage protagonist, in coming-of-age drama The Perks of Being a Wallflower. Due to the nature of her character in Perks, she said that agreeing to take on the part had been a difficult decision. Her next role was that of love interest Sally in the same year's Putzel, an independent romcom. In their critique of the film, the Tallahassee Democrat stated that Lynskey "steals the show [... Putzel] sparks to life whenever [she] arrives on the screen", while Redefine described her as "delightful" and "deftly believable".

Lynskey's portrayal of Amy Minsky in Hello I Must Be Going (2012), an unemployed divorcee who finds herself living back at home with her parents, was met with critical acclaim. For the first time in her career, Lynskey appeared in every scene throughout the film; she described the experience as "a lot of pressure" and said that, because of her lack of bankability at the time, she had assumed the part would be given to somebody like Michelle Williams or Maggie Gyllenhaal. Speaking of his decision to cast Lynskey, director Todd Louiso said, "I knew if I cast her, the film had the potential to resonate on a thousand different levels". In his review for the Los Angeles Times, Kenneth Turan wrote:

If you know the name Melanie Lynskey, you're already planning to see her in Hello I Must Be Going. If you don't, this film will have you making up for lost time. That's how good an actress she is [...] Lynskey inhabits the role so completely, brings such exquisite naturalness to her performance, that she becomes someone we root for unreservedly.

In a similar appraisal, USA Today noted that "Lynskey brings dimension and intelligence" and a "sympathetic blend of humor [and] dignity to the role". The performance earned her a nomination for the Gotham Independent Film Award for Breakthrough Actor, while Screen Rant placed it at #6 in their rundown of the best film acting of the early 2010s. The following year, Lynskey took on a lead role in The Big Ask, an independent black comedy. Her work as Hannah was praised, with Brian Tallerico stating in his review for RogerEbert.com, "[she] so often finds ways to elevate lackluster screenwriting, and does so again here. She's the best thing about the movie".

Gillian Jacobs (right) and Lynskey discussing The Big Ask (2013)—known then as Teddy Bears—at the Seattle International Film Festival

In April 2014, Lynskey was named an Emerging Master honouree at the RiverRun International Film Festival. Her first film project that year was Happy Christmas, where she played Kelly, a creatively bored novelist whose passion for writing is rekindled when her disruptive sister-in-law comes to visit. The film drew attention for being almost entirely improvised, with Stephen Holden of The New York Times stating, "The performances [are] so natural that the actors melt into their characters"; while other critics singled out Lynskey as a highlight. She then had a supporting role in David Wain's satirical romcom They Came Together, and played the female leads in We'll Never Have Paris—the directorial debut of Simon Helberg—and Angus MacLachlan's Goodbye to All That. In his review of Goodbye to All That, Bilge Ebiri said that Lynskey's portrayal of frustrated wife Annie was "fantastic", while Variety described her as "heartbreaking [...] This is what falling out of love looks like. It's not screaming matches and altercations; it's apathy and indifference." Towards the end of 2014, she provided the voice of Beatrice, an ill-tempered bluebird, for Cartoon Network's Over the Garden Wall. In their appraisal of the animated miniseries, which has since been recognised as a cult classic, The A.V. Club commented, "Lynskey steals the show with her amazing putdowns and passive-aggressiveness, smartly avoiding overdone sass or sarcasm."

Lynskey discussing We'll Never Have Paris (2014) at South by Southwest

Between 2015 and 2016, Lynskey played Michelle Pierson on HBO's Togetherness, which focused on the lives of two couples living under the same roof. Created by the Duplass brothers, the heavily improvised dramedy series was a "dream" job for Lynskey, who referred to its co-writer and director, Jay Duplass, as her "creative soulmate". The show's performances were commended, with critics paying particular attention to Lynskey. Writing for the Los Angeles Times, Robert Lloyd said, "[Lynskey] is all deep waters and live wires; soft and steely, trying on new personas for size, her Michelle becomes the series' gravitational center. You can feel her feeling". The performance earned her a nomination for the Critics' Choice Television Award for Best Supporting Actress, and was singled out by numerous publications as being worthy of an Emmy nomination. It was announced in March 2016 that HBO would not be renewing Togetherness for a third season; Lynskey compared this to having her "heart broken by someone I'm still in love with".

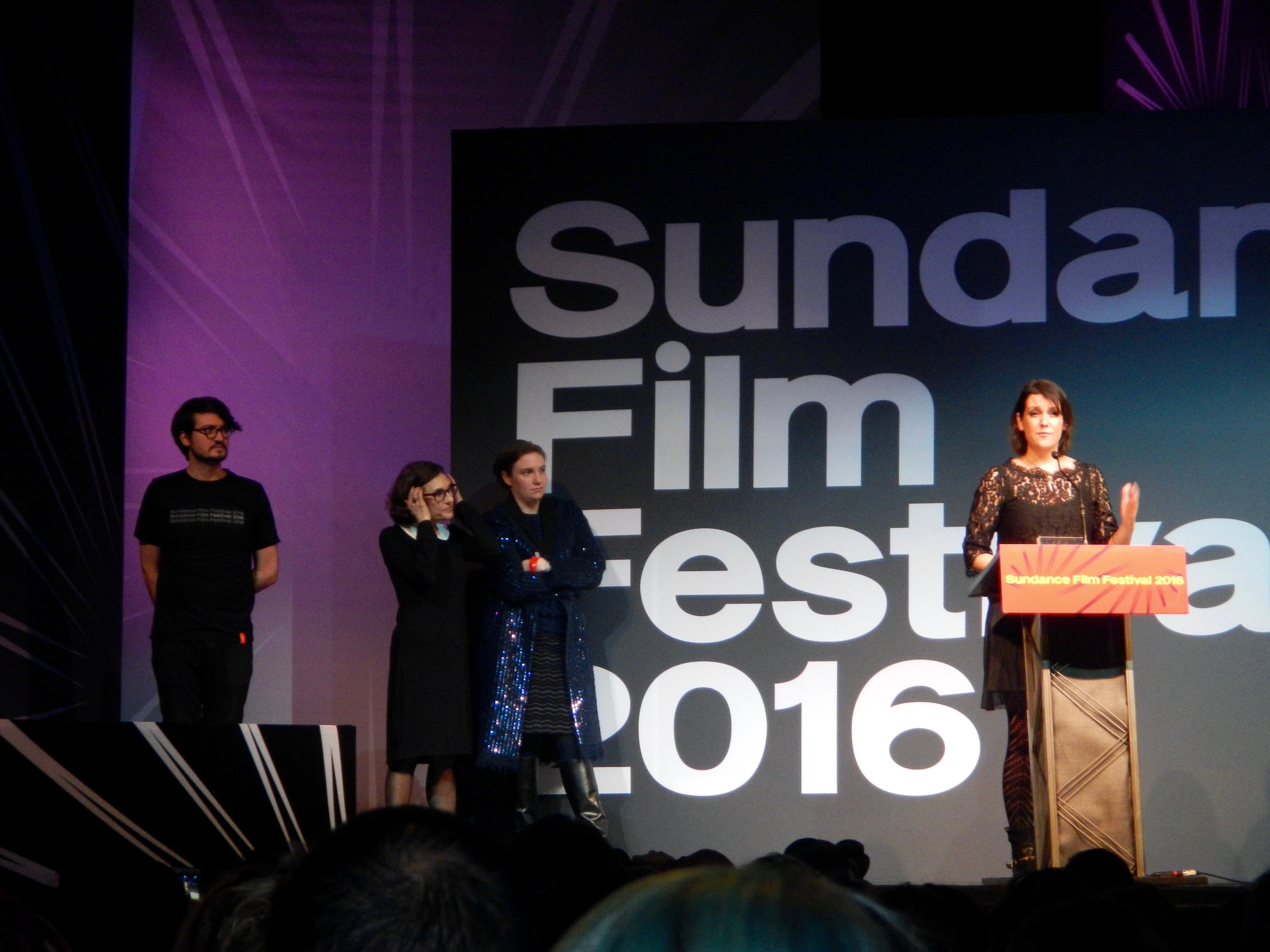
Lynskey accepting her Special Jury Prize for The Intervention (2016) at the Sundance Film Festival

For her starring role in The Intervention (2016), Lynskey received the U.S. Dramatic Special Jury Award for Individual Performance at the Sundance Film Festival. In his review for IndieWire, Russ Fischer pointed out Lynskey's "tremendously good comic timing", while Ethan Anderton of /Film noted, "Lynskey is the standout, delivering a performance that is genuine, funny and touching all at the same time." The film was the directorial debut of Clea DuVall, who wrote the character of Annie, an uptight alcoholic, specifically for Lynskey. She sought the help of a therapist before the film went into production to prepare herself for working with DuVall, a close friend of several years: "I didn't want anything to happen to our friendship and a big challenge was being able to stick up for myself and my perspective in regard to the script and this character." Also that year, she starred in the one-off BBC Two comedy Our Ex-Wife, which was followed by prominent roles in the independent features Rainbow Time, Little Boxes, and The Great & the Small. Variety's Joe Leydon described her work in The Great & the Small—where she played Margaret, a schoolteacher grieving the loss of her only son—as "quietly devastating".

Lynskey discussing Rainbow Time (2016) at South by Southwest

Lynskey's performance in the Netflix crime thriller I Don't Feel at Home in This World Anymore (2017) was roundly praised by critics. The film's director, Macon Blair, wrote the character of Ruth, an aggrieved nursing assistant who takes the law into her own hands after her house is burgled, with Lynskey in mind. The role proved to be physically challenging, as it involved stunt work and the use of prosthetics. Peter Debruge of Variety commended Blair for giving Lynskey "something unforgettable to do" and felt that she delivered her "best work yet", while Time Out described her as "seething and magnetic". In his review for RogerEbert.com, Matt Zoller Seitz said:

[Lynskey is] one of those actresses I'm never not glad to see, and it's a treat to see her front-and-center here, carrying an entire movie mainly with her eyes, face and shoulders. A performance like this one can be quite tricky—you're essentially reactive a lot of the time, more of a sponge for the film than the motor driving it along—but Lynskey makes everything active by letting you feel Ruth's emotions and sense her train of thought as she puts various pieces together in her head, drawing correct or wrongheaded conclusions. She's also just a terrific audience surrogate. When she snarls or snaps, I wanted to cheer.

I Don't Feel at Home won the Grand Jury Prize at the 2017 Sundance Festival while Lynskey received a nomination for that year's Gotham Award for Best Actress. Next, she headlined the controversial independent drama And Then I Go, with Parade's Samuel R. Murrian commending her "quality work" as the concerned parent of a troubled high schooler. That same year, she received a Golden Nymph nomination for starring as Zara Skelton, a headstrong criminal defence lawyer, in the Australian miniseries Sunshine; played the mother of a teenage witch in The Changeover, a fantasy thriller shot in New Zealand; and appeared as a flustered housewife—frantically trying to conceal her husband's corpse after finding him dead—in the horror film XX. In their review of XX, Time said of Lynskey, "terrific as always, [she] brings a grace note of pathos to the wicked proceedings".

In Sadie (2018), Lynskey starred as Rae, a woman bringing up her daughter in the confines of a trailer park while her husband serves in the military. Variety described her work in the drama as "compelling", while Frank Scheck of The Hollywood Reporter stated, "It's no surprise that Lynskey, who has quietly [been] establishing herself as one of indie cinema's finest actors, is once again superb in her emotionally complex turn". Next, she appeared in the principal role of troubled psychic Molly Strand on the first season of Castle Rock, a supernatural horror series based on characters and settings from the books of Stephen King. It premiered on Hulu in July 2018, with critics pointing out the strong work of the cast: Paste referred to Lynskey as "delicately complex", while Alan Sepinwall of Rolling Stone felt the show was "the latest example of how much humanity and grounding [Lynskey] can bring to the most surreal and macabre of stories – it's a tradition that goes back to when she was a teenager in Heavenly Creatures." Earlier that same year, the Seattle International Film Festival hosted a tribute event in celebration of Lynskey's career.

Between April and May 2020, Lynskey appeared as Rosemary Thomson in the FX on Hulu period miniseries Mrs. America, a political drama centred on the life and career of conservative activist Phyllis Schlafly, played by Cate Blanchett. Her portrayal of the real-life Thomson, an ambitious champion of Schlafly and a staunch opposer of the Equal Rights Amendment, was described by critics as "delightful" and a "standout" among the cast. Despite not sharing her beliefs, Lynskey said that her own Baptist upbringing enabled her to empathize with Rosemary's position, and called working with Blanchett "one of the great experiences of my life".

=== 2021–present: Yellowjackets and awards success ===
Lynskey agreed to star as a layabout stoner in Lady of the Manor (2021), the directorial debut of Justin Long, because "the thought of being in sweatpants [and] acting like I was high for a whole movie was so freeing". Her performance was well received, with The Hollywood Reporter commenting that she "brings the same airtight commitment to hot mess Hannah that she does to all her varied roles", while Screen Rant felt she "unabashedly embraces physical humor [and] really commits to the gags". Adam McKay's satirical tackling of the climate crisis, Don't Look Up, was Lynskey's second film project that year: her portrayal of June Mindy, Leonardo DiCaprio's put-upon wife, was described as "terrific" by The Hollywood Reporter, while IndieWire called her "low-key brilliant" and felt she brought a "clear-headed" presence to the narrative. She said that working on Up and bonding with DiCaprio had been "beautiful".

On Showtime's Yellowjackets, Lynskey plays Shauna Sadecki, a suburban housewife carrying grim secrets about a plane crash that occurred twenty-five years ago. The series premiered in November 2021, with Rolling Stone feeling that Lynskey was the "standout" among its ensemble cast: "She's always great, but [this] feels like the kind of dark, messy, and charismatic part she's been waiting her whole career to play." In a similar review, The Guardian agreed that "Lynskey does by far the most emotional heavy lifting of the series". She admitted it was Shauna's "internalized rage" that attracted her to the role, as well as "a real dark streak [that I] loved and was also terrified of". For her work on Yellowjackets, Lynskey won Best Actress in a Drama Series at the 27th Critics' Choice Awards, where her acceptance speech drew attention for paying tribute to her daughter's nanny. Her subsequent accolades for playing Shauna include two nominations for the Primetime Emmy Award for Outstanding Lead Actress, in 2022 and 2023.

In the true crime miniseries Candy, Lynskey co-starred as Betty Gore, a Texan schoolteacher battling postpartum depression who is murdered by her husband's lover, Candy Montgomery (played by Jessica Biel). Airing on Hulu in May 2022, the show's acting was widely praised: Entertainment Weekly felt that Lynskey "captures the sadness and seething resentment of a woman stifled by the confines of stay-at-home motherhood", while RogerEbert.com's Brian Tallerico said, "She does so much with just a sigh or defeated body language". Writing for the Chicago Sun-Times, Richard Roeper believed the real Gore was "clearly depressed and in need of help" and that "through Lynskey's performance, we find that tragic and heartbreaking". Lynskey spoke of the intense emotion involved in recreating her character's death, saying that she and co-star Biel took great care to perfect the sequence's staging and choreography. She went on to receive Critics' Choice and Satellite Award nominations for her portrayal of Gore.

On HBO's The Last of Us, an adaptation of the action-adventure video game, Lynskey appeared in the guest role of Kathleen Coghlan, a ruthless war criminal. The character was created specially for the series by executive producer Craig Mazin, who wanted to work with Lynskey. The show premiered in January 2023, with Stephen Kelly of BBC Culture stating that Lynskey's "chillingly violent" performance was "superb"; while Daniel Fienberg felt she was "thoroughly effective" in his review for The Hollywood Reporter, and Ben Travers of IndieWire wrote that one piece of dialogue in particular—"kids die, they die all the time"—stood out for him as "an all-time cold-blooded bad guy quote, delivered with exhausted gravity by the great Melanie Lynskey". The performance earned her a nomination for that year's Emmy Award for Outstanding Guest Actress in a Drama Series.

In the Peacock historical drama series The Tattooist of Auschwitz, Lynskey portrayed New Zealand social worker Heather Morris, a fledgling novelist who befriends an elderly Holocaust survivor—played by Harvey Keitel—and pitches him her idea for a book about his time spent imprisoned at a concentration camp. The show was released in May 2024, with The Daily Beast's Nick Schager pointing out Lynskey's chemistry with Keitel but criticising the quality of the wig she had to wear in an effort to resemble the real Morris. Other reviewers believed her work to be "understated [and] endlessly empathetic", as well as "measured, nuanced, textured, and altogether beautiful". Owing to the nature of the material, Lynskey described the filming experience as "heavy", but said she felt it was "important to tell as many stories as we can from this period in history". Later that year, she appeared as the fatigued mother of a precocious young playwright in the coming-of-age independent comedy Griffin in Summer, with Paste describing her as "excellent" and Jason Adams of Pajiba writing, "[She lands] every little punchline and exasperated look [...] She's always a magic trick."

In the 2025 film Pike River, a New Zealand drama based on the Pike River Mine disaster of 2010, Lynskey starred as Anna Osborne, the spouse of one of the miners who lost their lives—along with 27 other workers—during an underground explosion. In her review for The Spinoff, Alex Casey described Lynskey as "bolshy and brusque", adding, "[she] and Malcolm give career-best performances that feel as lived in as their pilled waterfall cardigans, scuffed slouchy boots and chequered wool blankets. These are two nurturing yet gnarly women, who are just as likely to give a foot rub to the elderly as they are to tell a CEO to fuck off." While promoting the film, Lynskey expressed her hope that the real Osbourne—with whom she developed a close bond during production—and the rest of the families involved with the tragedy would be successful in their ongoing fight for corporate accountability.

Lynskey's next film role was in the musical melodrama Don't Say Good Luck (2026). Debuting on Netflix in August that year to positive reviews, critics felt that the parent-teenager bond between Lynskey and co-star Sunny Sandler was "deeply believable." Of Lynskey's portrayal of Elizabeth, a mother coming to terms with the relapse of a cancer diagnosis she thought she'd beaten, the Los Angeles Times commented, "[She] proves, yet again, that she can do anything [... lifting] what could have been a [sappy] cancer-mom tale into a quietly transcendent contemplation of motherhood"; while TheWrap's William Bibbiani called her "the glue that holds [the film] together," writing, "We get to see the light gradually fading from her eyes [...] Too many filmmakers are afraid to let actors dwindle on camera [... Hart] and [Lynskey] handle the sad transformation with subtlety and fragile beauty."

== Acting style ==
Lynskey described herself as a character actress in the early stages of her career but has since renounced the term. Regarding her acting technique, she has said:

I don't have any training [...] so the only thing I have to go on is my own instinct. So if a director gives me a note that doesn't feel like it's in line with my instinct, it's very hard for me to do something [that] feels like a lie. So, I'll argue it, and I can get kind of feisty because I feel it in my body, I know what is right.

Asked by a journalist in 2012 about how she felt being cast—up to that point in her career—as a supporting player rather than a lead, Lynskey stated that the "meaty" film parts are mostly written for men, or actresses like Meryl Streep. She told a different journalist the same year, "It's been a big issue that I'm not [famous ...] I'll audition for something and then the feedback has been, 'The director wants you, the creative people want you, but the studio is saying no.' It's depressing, but I understand. People are investing a lot of money and they want somewhat of a guarantee". She has subsequently taken on leading roles in numerous independent films and been labelled an "indie queen".

Speaking in 2017 about taking risks in her film work, Lynskey said, "I want to tell stories about women who are interesting and complicated and not like people you've seen before [...] There aren't that many opportunities [to do that] except in the independent film world. I've made films that have cost $50,000 for the entire film. If you're willing to work like that, you get chances to do really creative, interesting stuff".

Lynskey is often complimented on her ability to perform an American accent. She attributes this to staying with Joss Whedon when she first moved to Los Angeles: "When I came here, I stayed in his guest bedroom. I watched movie after movie and learned American accents". Tim Blake Nelson recalled that when she auditioned for the part of Colleen in Leaves of Grass, "She came in and auditioned for me and then [afterwards she opened her] mouth and started talking in a New Zealand accent and I just couldn't believe it, because her south-eastern Oklahoma accent was so spot on, and it's a very specific accent."

Lynskey is known for her improvisation skills, which she attributes to classes she attended in her youth. She regularly employs dreamwork to help her get into character, as well as music: "Every movie I've done I have a particular song I keep going back to that puts me in the right emotional place."

== Other work ==
In 2012, Lynskey voiced an animated version of herself in a pre-flight safety video for Air New Zealand.

In February 2013, she participated in a Live Read performance of the 1992 film Glengarry Glen Ross. The event was directed by Jason Reitman, who assembled a cast of women to read the all-male script; Lynskey played the role of George Aaronow, originally portrayed by Alan Arkin.

Between 2014 and 2016, Lynskey featured on several occasions as part of The Thrilling Adventure Hour, a staged podcast in the style of old-time radio, which was performed monthly in Los Angeles. In 2015, she starred in the music video for the song "Waiting on Love" by Nicki Bluhm and The Gramblers, alongside her then-boyfriend Jason Ritter.

Lynskey served on the jury for the U.S. Narrative Competition at the 2017 Tribeca Festival. In June 2018, she was invited to become a member of the Academy of Motion Picture Arts and Sciences.

In October 2023, Lynskey narrated Devin Scillian's Memoirs of a Hamster for Storyline Online, a branch of the SAG-AFTRA Foundation that specialises in child literacy.

Lynskey was selected as one of the judges for the 2024 Heath Ledger Scholarship, an initiative that offers financial support and career mentorship to emerging Australian talent.

== Public image ==
Lynskey has appeared on the covers of magazines such as The Hollywood Reporter, InStyle, Variety, TheWrap, and Backstage.

Writing for InStyle in 2022, Laura Norkin referred to Lynskey as "the nicest person in Hollywood" and "one of the most skilled and compelling [actresses] of our time". In the same article, actress Danielle Brooks said of Lynskey's reputation in the industry, "People are like, 'She's the real deal. She will deliver'".

In a 2023 article for The New York Times, Alexis Soloski described Lynskey as "polite almost to the point of pathology", adding, "Offscreen, Lynskey is a very nice lady. Unnervingly nice. Onscreen she specializes in a ferocious deconstruction of that same type. For the past decade, and particularly in the past couple of years [...] she has embodied women who seem innocuous on the surface – breathy, meek, bland – only to reveal limitless anger and desire." Writing for TheWrap that same year, Libby Hill called Lynskey a "pop culture fan favorite".

Lynskey told a journalist in 2012 that, for a while, the only roles she was being offered were "fat-girl parts", adding, "Seriously? Sometimes I feel like I'm making some kind of radical statement because I'm a size 6". In a 2022 interview with The Hollywood Reporter, she discussed being body-shamed early on in her career: "It was ridiculous. I was already starving myself and as thin as I could possibly be [...] people [were] putting a lot of Spanx on me in wardrobe fittings [... costume designers would say], "Nobody told me there would be girls like you" [...] the feedback was constantly like, 'You're not beautiful'". That same year, when asked how she was dealing with the response to her role on Yellowjackets, Lynskey explained to The Guardian that a lot of attention was being placed on her weight: "It's [about] trying to tune out [the negative comments] and just [listening] to the women who say: thank you for just being on screen and not pinching your tummy, or being like: 'I wish I was thinner'". Meanwhile, she said that the creators of Yellowjackets were "excited" about her being "an average-size woman": "Nobody's pressuring me to look a different way [and] that's something that I did not think would ever be possible".

In February 2023, Lynskey responded to criticism of her casting in The Last of Us, when fashion model Adrianne Curry implied that Lynskey's body type made her ill-suited to the role of a villainous leader: "[The character is] supposed to be smart, ma'am. I don't need to be muscly. That's what henchmen are for." Jeffrey Pierce, Lynskey's co-star on the show, defended her by saying, "Hollywood has done a terrible job of creating the mythology of, what is a man? What is a woman? What are these aesthetics that we hold up as power?", adding that he thought Lynskey had handled the situation with "grace [and] courage".

Though not gay herself, Lynskey is widely considered a gay icon.

== Personal life ==
In 2001, Lynskey met American actor Jimmi Simpson during the filming of Rose Red. They were engaged in 2005 and married on 14 April 2007, on Lake Hayes near Queenstown, New Zealand. Lynskey filed for divorce on 25 September 2012, citing irreconcilable differences, and the divorce was finalised on 23 May 2014.

In February 2017, Lynskey announced that she was engaged to American actor Jason Ritter, whom she had been dating for four years after meeting on the set of The Big Ask. They have a daughter, born in December 2018. The couple married in 2021.

Lynskey has lived in Los Angeles since 2000. She is a close friend of Clea DuVall, whom she met when they appeared together in But I'm a Cheerleader. She became a vegetarian at age 10 after learning about sheep farming but is now pescetarian. Lynskey has misophonia. She describes herself as a feminist.

Lynskey has been open about her past struggle with an eating disorder, saying that she was "very unwell" for a long time: "I was so unhappy and my hair was falling out [... eventually] I was like, 'I just need to look the way I'm supposed to look' [... I had] to truly become comfortable with myself, because you can't fake it."

== Filmography and accolades ==
According to the review aggregate site Rotten Tomatoes, Lynskey's most acclaimed films include Heavenly Creatures (1994), Ever After (1998), Shattered Glass (2003), Flags of Our Fathers (2006), Up in the Air (2009), The Informant! (2009), Win Win (2011), Hello I Must Be Going (2012), The Perks of Being a Wallflower (2012), Happy Christmas (2014), The Intervention (2016), I Don't Feel at Home in This World Anymore (2017), And Then I Go (2017), Sadie (2018), Griffin in Summer (2024), Pike River (2025), and Don't Say Good Luck (2026). Her television work includes Two and a Half Men (2003–2015), Togetherness (2015–2016), Castle Rock (2018), Mrs. America (2020), Candy (2022), and Yellowjackets (2021–present). Her films have grossed $733 million worldwide.

Lynskey's numerous accolades include a Sundance Special Jury Award and three Critics Choice Awards, in addition to nominations for three Primetime Emmy Awards, three Gotham Awards, one Independent Spirit Award, and one Screen Actors Guild Award.
