= Big Ask =

Big Ask may refer to:

- the Big Ask, a 2006 British environmentalist campaign
- Alexander Armstrong's Big Ask, a 2011-2013 British panel show
- The Big Ask (film), a 2013 American comedy film
