= Gillian Jacobs =

American actress (born 1982)

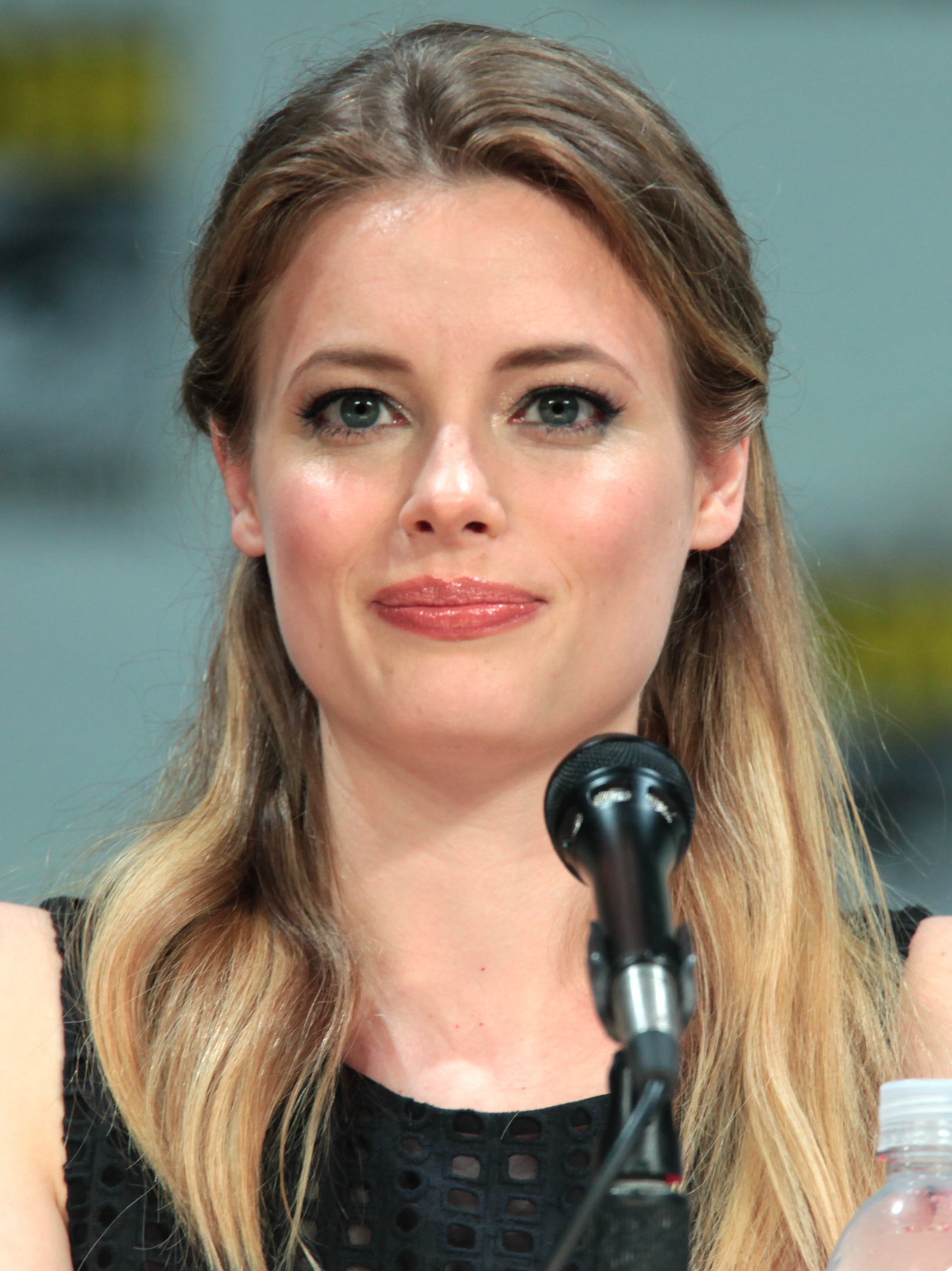
- Jacobs at San Diego Comic-Con at San Diego on July 24, 2014
- Born: Gillian MacLaren Jacobs; October 19, 1982 (age 44); Pittsburgh, Pennsylvania, U.S.
- Education: Juilliard School (BFA)
- Occupation: Actress
- Years active: 2005–present
- Partner: Christopher Storer

Gillian MacLaren Jacobs (/ˈɡɪliən/; born October 19, 1982) is an American actress. She is known for playing Britta Perry in the NBC sitcom Community (2009–2015) and Mickey Dobbs in the Netflix romantic comedy series Love (2016–2018). Her other notable television roles include Mimi-Rose Howard in the fourth season of the HBO comedy-drama series Girls (2015), Atom Eve in the superhero animated series Invincible (2021–present), Tiffany Jerimovich in the FX on Hulu comedy-drama series The Bear (2022–2026), and Mary Jayne Gold in the Netflix miniseries Transatlantic (2023).

She has also appeared in films such as Gardens of the Night (2008), Don't Think Twice (2016), Ibiza (2018), I Used to Go Here (2020), and the Fear Street trilogy (2021).

== Early life ==
Gillian MacLaren Jacobs was born in Pittsburgh on October 19, 1982, the only child of college administrator Martina Magenau and investment banker William Francis Jacobs III, son of William Francis Jacobs Jr. and wife Mary Margaret Haskins. Her parents divorced when she was two years old, and she was raised by her mother in Mt. Lebanon, Pennsylvania. Her maternal family owned a brewery, Erie Brewing Company in Erie, Pennsylvania, where her grandfather John Martin Magenau Jr., married to her grandmother Carol Marie Spiller, was president and CEO until it closed in 1978.

Jacobs was enrolled in her first acting course at age eight and attended weekend acting classes at the Pittsburgh Playhouse while growing up. She performed with the Pittsburgh Public Theater, where she was a perennial contender in the Public's Shakespeare Monologue Contest, leading her to be cast as Titania in its production of A Midsummer Night's Dream.

After graduating from Mt. Lebanon High School in 2000, she moved to New York City to attend the Juilliard School, where she graduated with a BFA in 2004.

== Career ==
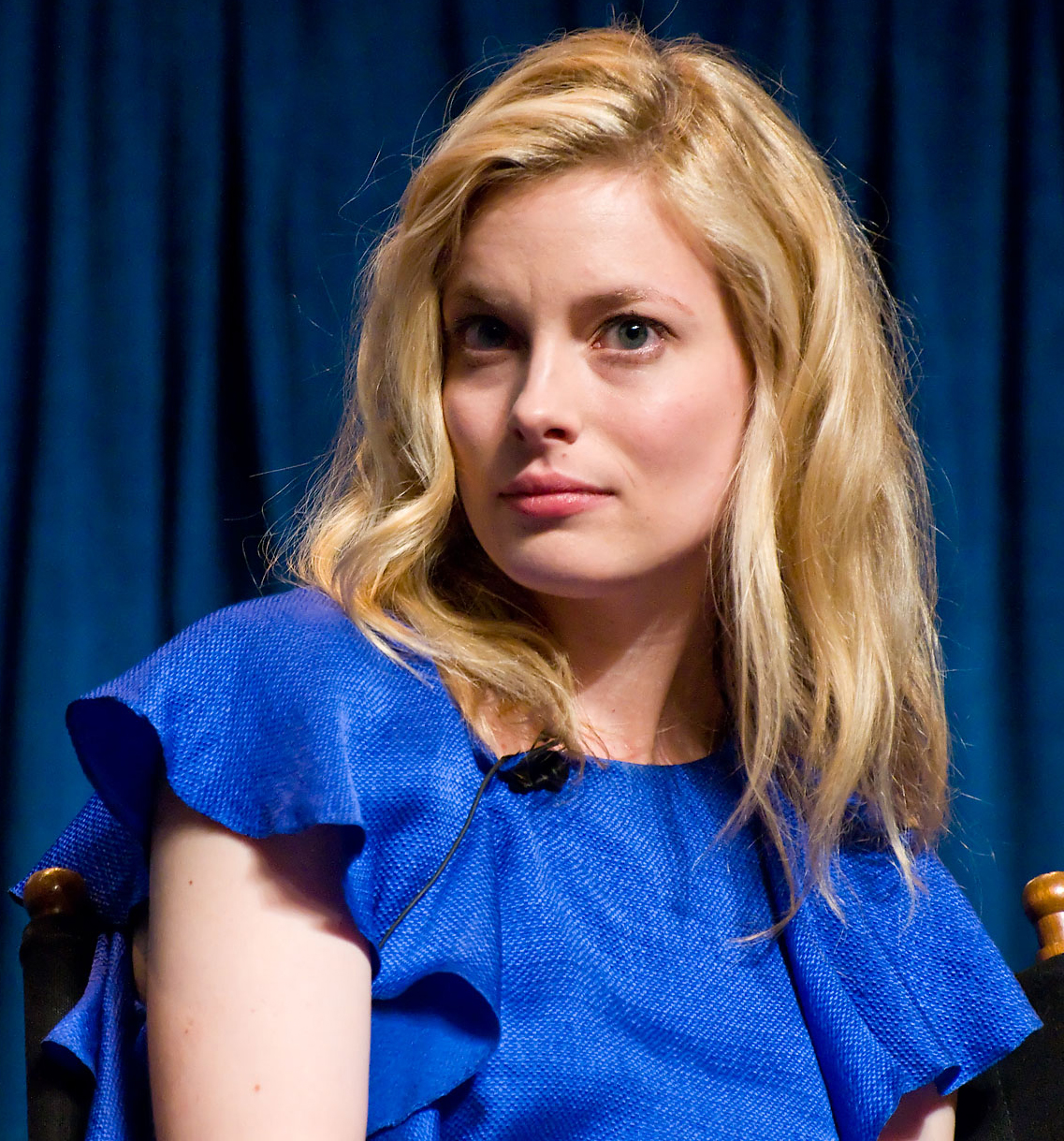
Jacobs at PaleyFest at Los Angeles in March 2010

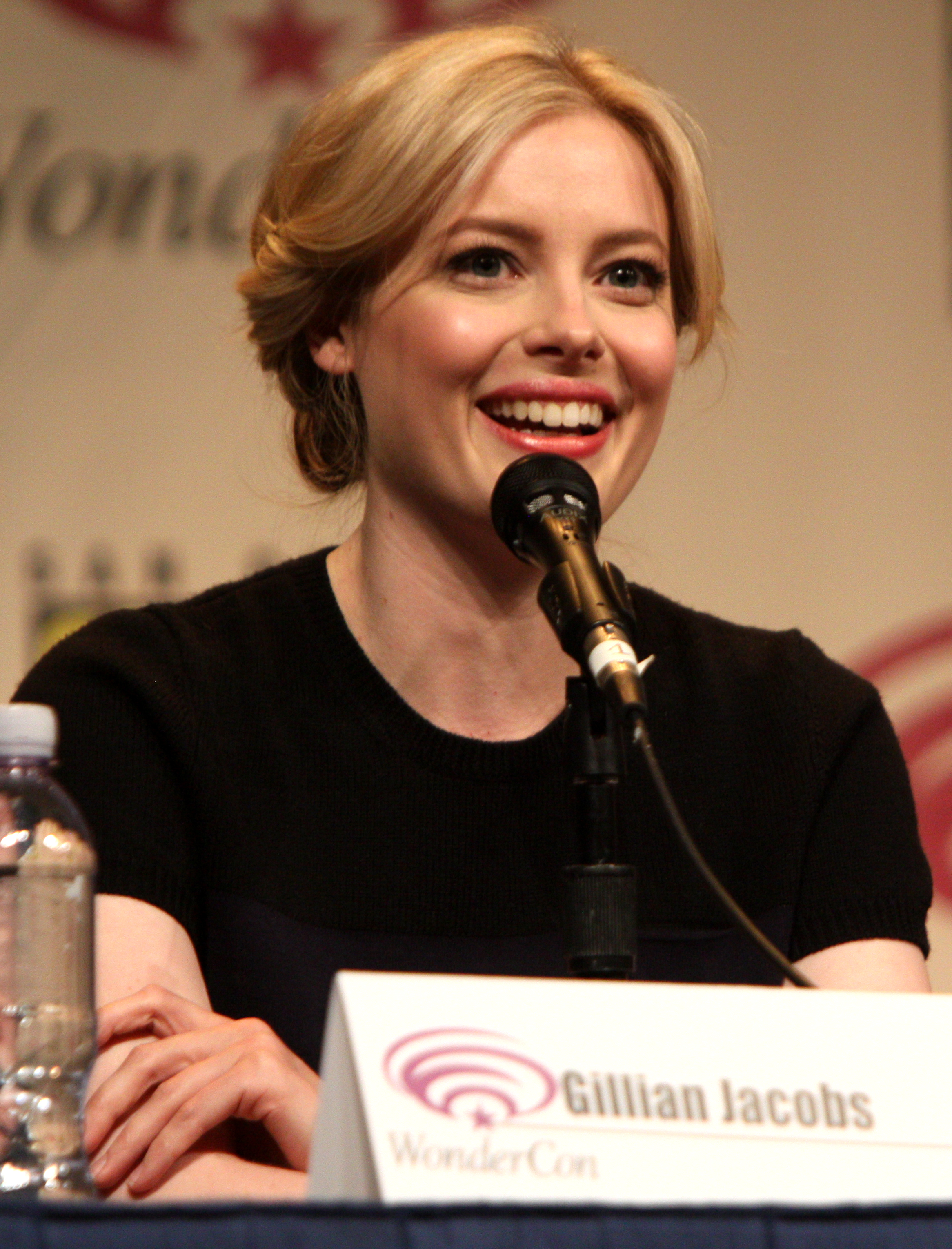
Jacobs at WonderCon at Anaheim on March 18, 2012

Jacobs at San Diego Comic-Con at San Diego in July 2012

Jacobs at San Diego Comic-Con at San Diego in July 2012

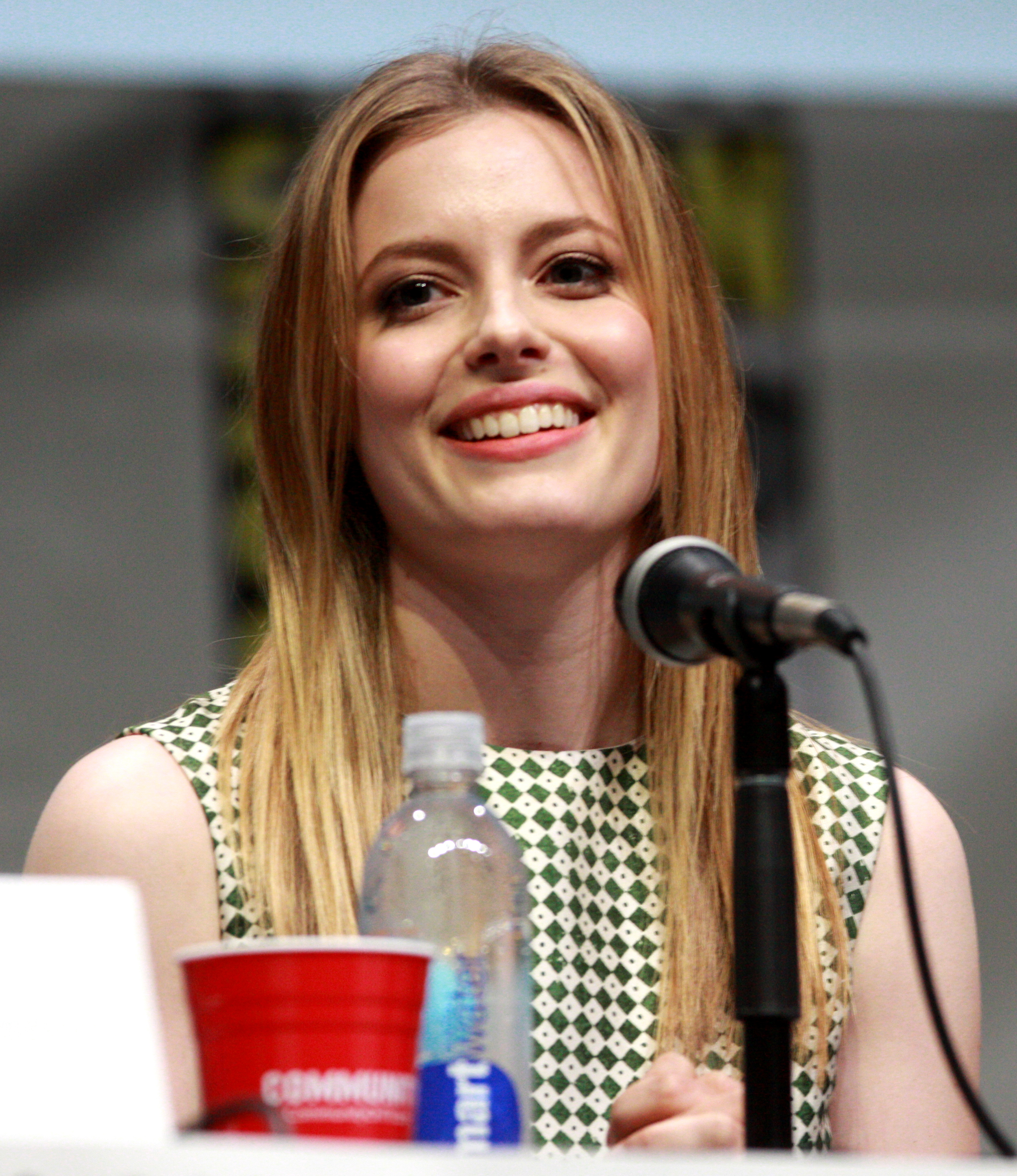
Jacobs at San Diego Comic-Con at San Diego in July 2013

Jacobs and Melanie Lynskey discussing The Big Ask (at the time called Teddy Bears) in July 2013

Jacobs starred in the television series The Book of Daniel. Although she played Kim in the pilot of Traveler, the role was given to Pascale Hutton when ABC acquired the series; the series was canceled after eight episodes. Jacobs subsequently made guest appearances on Fringe and Law & Order: Criminal Intent. In 2006, she starred in an Off-Off-Broadway production of Christopher Denham's cagelove. While overall critical reaction to the play was negative, Jacobs earned praise in several reviews. The New York Times advised readers to "remember the name of Gillian Jacobs, a stunning Juilliard graduate who has the glow of a star in the making".

Jacobs has appeared in theatrical productions, such as The Fabulous Life of a Size Zero (2007), A Feminine Ending (2007), and The Little Flower of East Orange (2008). In March 2009, she joined the cast of the NBC single-camera comedy series Community as Britta Perry, a high school dropout who aspires to become a psychologist. Her film work includes Blackbird (2007), Choke (2008), Gardens of the Night (2008), The Box (2009), Revenge for Jolly! (2012), Bad Milo! (2013), Walk of Shame (2014), The Lookalike (2014), Life Partners (2014), Hot Tub Time Machine 2 (2015), Visions (2015), Don't Think Twice (2016), and Brother Nature (2016). She voiced Sta'abi in the Nickelodeon animated series Monsters vs. Aliens and Atom Eve in the Amazon Prime animated series Invincible.

Community was canceled by NBC on May 9, 2014, and later that month, it was reported that Jacobs had landed a recurring role as Mimi-Rose Howard in the fourth season of the HBO series Girls. In June 2014, Yahoo! Screen picked up Community for a sixth season. It was announced on September 16, 2014, that Jacobs was set to star as Mickey in the Netflix original comedy series Love.

Jacobs directed the 2015 documentary short The Queen of Code about computer scientist and United States Navy rear admiral Grace Hopper. In 2017, Jacobs co-starred in Janicza Bravo's first full length feature, Lemon, which debuted at Sundance Film Festival.

In 2018, she directed Curated, a narrative short film, as a part of a series produced by TNT and Refinery29.

In 2020, Jacobs starred in the comedy-drama film I Used to Go Here. She directed the episode "Higher, Further, Faster" for the documentary series Marvel's 616.

In February 2021, she and co-host Diona Reasonover premiered a STEM-focused podcast, Periodic Talks, on Stitcher Radio. In July 2021, she had a supporting role in the Fear Street horror film trilogy on Netflix as Christine "Ziggy" Berman.

From 2022 to 2026, she guest starred in ten episodes of the television series The Bear, playing Tiffany Jerimovich. In May 2026, Hulu released "Gary", a standalone special episode of The Bear streaming separately from the rest of the show's catalogue. The episode, written by stars Ebon Moss-Bachrach and Jon Bernthal, is set before the events of the series. Jacobs reprised her role from The Bear for the special.

== Personal life ==
Jacobs does not drink alcohol, smoke, or take any recreational drugs, a choice she made when she was younger after watching some family members struggle with addiction. She revealed that her father was an addict and that she was fearful of becoming the same, a feeling reinforced in her youth by reading the book Go Ask Alice, which follows a teenage girl suffering drug addiction.

Since 2011 Jacobs has been in a relationship with Christopher Storer.

== Filmography ==
=== Film ===
| Year | Title | Role | Notes |
|---|---|---|---|
| 2005 | Building Girl | Katie | |
| 2007 | Blackbird | Froggy | |
| 2008 | Choke | Cherry Daiquiri / Beth | |
| 2008 | Gardens of the Night | Leslie Whitehead | |
| 2009 | The Box | Dana | |
| 2009 | Solitary Man | Tall Girl | |
| 2010 | Helena from the Wedding | Helena | |
| 2010 | Nonames | CJ | |
| 2010 | Coach | Zoe | |
| 2011 | Let Go | Darla DeMint | |
| 2012 | Watching TV with the Red Chinese | Suzanne | |
| 2012 | Revenge for Jolly! | Tina | |
| 2012 | Adventures in the Sin Bin | Lauren | |
| 2012 | Seeking a Friend for the End of the World | Katie | |
| 2013 | The Incredible Burt Wonderstone | Miranda | |
| 2013 | It's Not You, It's Me | Babe | Short film |
| 2013 | Bad Milo! | Sarah | |
| 2013 | The Big Ask | Emily | |
| 2013 | Made in Cleveland | Martha | |
| 2013 | Crush | Shira | Short film |
| 2014 | Life Partners | Paige Kearns | |
| 2014 | Walk of Shame | Rose | |
| 2014 | The Lookalike | Lacey / Sadie | |
| 2014 | Black or White | Fay | |
| 2015 | The Queen of Code | —N/a | Documentary short film; Director |
| 2015 | Hot Tub Time Machine 2 | Jill | |
| 2015 | No Way Jose | Penny | |
| 2015 | Visions | Sadie | |
| 2016 | Don't Think Twice | Samantha | |
| 2016 | Dean | Nicky | |
| 2016 | Brother Nature | Gwen Turley | |
| 2017 | Lemon | Tracy | |
| 2018 | Life of the Party | Helen | |
| 2018 | Ibiza | Harper | |
| 2018 | Curated | —N/a | Short film; Director |
| 2020 | I Used to Go Here | Kate Conklin | |
| 2020 | Magic Camp | Kristina Darkwood | |
| 2020 | Come Play | Sarah | |
| 2021 | North Hollywood | Abigaile | |
| 2021 | Mark, Mary & Some Other People | Dr. Jacobs | |
| 2021 | Fear Street Part One: 1994 | C. Berman | |
| 2021 | Fear Street Part Two: 1978 | Adult Christine "Ziggy" Berman | |
| 2021 | Fear Street Part Three: 1666 | Adult Christine "Ziggy" Berman | |
| 2021 | Injustice | Harley Quinn | Voice; direct-to-video |
| 2022 | More Than Robots | —N/a | Documentary; Director |
| 2022 | The Contractor | Brianne Harper | |
| 2022 | The Seven Faces of Jane | Jane | Directed segment: "Goodbye / Hello"; also writer |
| 2022 | Night at the Museum: Kahmunrah Rises Again | Erica Daley | Voice |
| 2026 | The Musical | Abigail | |

=== Television ===
| Year | Title | Role | Notes |
|---|---|---|---|
| 2006 | The Book of Daniel | Adele Congreve | 3 episodes |
| 2007 | Traveler | Kimberly | Episode: "Pilot" |
| 2007 | Up All Night | Marni | Unaired pilot |
| 2008 | Fringe | Joanne Ostler | Episode: "The Equation" |
| 2009 | Law & Order: Criminal Intent | Sue Smith | Episode: "Rock Star" |
| 2009 | Royal Pains | Tess Frimoli | Episode: "There Will Be Food" |
| 2009 | The Good Wife | Sonia | Episode: "Pilot" |
| 2009–2015 | Community | Britta Perry | 110 episodes |
| 2010 | Aqua Teen Hunger Force | Carl's Wife | Voice, episode: "Larry Miller Hair System" |
| 2012 | Robot Chicken | Various Characters | Voice, episode: "Punctured Jugular" |
| 2012–2016 | Comedy Bang! Bang! | Post-Apocalypse Woman / Herself | 3 episodes |
| 2013 | The Venture Bros. | Marsha Backwood | Voice, episode: "Venture Libre" |
| 2013–2014 | Monsters vs. Aliens | Sta'abi, additional characters | Voice, 12 episodes |
| 2014 | Rupaul's Drag Race | Guest Judge | Episode: "Snatch Game" |
| 2014 | The Greatest Event in Television History | Sonny | Episode: "Bosom Buddies" |
| 2014 | American Dad! | Christy | Voice, episode: "Introducing the Naughty Stewardesses" |
| 2014 | Tim & Eric's Bedtime Stories | Young Patient | Episode: "Toes" |
| 2015 | Girls | Mimi-Rose Howard | 5 episodes |
| 2015 | Adventure Time | M.A.R.G.L.E.S. | Voice, episode: "You Forgot Your Floaties" |
| 2015 | Long Live the Royals | Rosalind | Voice, 4 episodes |
| 2016 | Great Minds with Dan Harmon | Ada Lovelace | Episode: "Ada Lovelace" |
| 2016–2018 | Love | Mickey Dobbs | 34 episodes |
| 2017 | Dr. Ken | Erin | Episode: "Ken's New Intern" |
| 2017 | Regular Show | Blu-ray, Dome Computer | Voice, 3 episodes |
| 2017 | Bajillion Dollar Propertie$ | Jenny Tanner | Episode: "Chelsea Leight-Leigh Lately" |
| 2017 | Justice League Action | Roxy Rocket | Voice, episode: "The Fatal Fare" |
| 2017 | Rick and Morty | Supernova | Voice, episode: "Vindicators 3: The Return of Worldender" |
| 2017 | HarmonQuest | Chip | Episode: "The Quest Continues" |
| 2018 | Random Acts of Flyness | Herself | Episode: "They Got Some S**t That'll Blow Out Our Back" |
| 2018 | Angie Tribeca | Becky Bunnker | Episode: "Joystick Luck Club" |
| 2019 | Weird City | Mulia | Episode: "Chonathan & Mulia & Barsley & Phephanie" |
| 2019 | At Home with Amy Sedaris | Herself | Episode: "Anniversary" |
| 2019 | Astronomy Club: The Sketch Show | Mary Poppins | Episode: "Full House But Black" |
| 2020 | The Twilight Zone | Annie Mitchell | Episode: "Meet in the Middle" |
| 2020 | Star Trek: Lower Decks | Lieutenant Barbara Brinson | Voice, episode: "Cupid's Errant Arrow" |
| 2020 | Earth to Ned | Herself | Episode: "Late Night Ned" |
| 2020 | Marvel's 616 | —N/a | Episode: "Higher, Further, Faster"; Director |
| 2021–present | Invincible | Samantha Eve Wilkins / Atom Eve | Voice, 27 episodes |
| 2021 | Cinema Toast | | Voice, episode: "Warehouse Friends" |
| 2021 | Aquaman: King of Atlantis | Mera | Voice, 3 episodes |
| 2021–2023 | Ten Year Old Tom | Dakota | Voice, 20 episodes |
| 2022–2023 | Winning Time: The Rise of the Lakers Dynasty | Chris Riley | 7 episodes |
| 2022–2023 | Minx | Maggie | 3 episodes |
| 2022–2026 | The Bear | Tiffany Jerimovich | 10 episodes |
| 2023 | Transatlantic | Mary Jayne Gold | 7 episodes |
| 2023 | StoryBots: Answer Time | | Voice, episode: "Glass" |
| 2023 | Ada Twist, Scientist | Miss Greer | Voice, episode: "A Twist in Time" |
| 2023 | Carol & the End of the World | Lisa | Voice, episode: "The Distraction" |
| 2024 | Yo Gabba GabbaLand! | Herself | Episode: "Land" |
| 2025 | Krapopolis | Ana | Voice, episode: "Ty Big Fat Greek Wedding" |
| 2025 | American Experience | Narrator | Voice, episode: "Mr. Polaroid" |
| 2025 | Long Story Short | Caitlyn McClendon | Voice, Episode: "Wolves" |
| 2025–2026 | Wylde Pak | Alice Kelly | Voice, 5 episodes |
| 2026 | President Curtis | Elsie | Voice, episode: "Purchase" |

=== Video games ===
| Year | Title | Role | Notes |
|---|---|---|---|
| 2026 | Invincible VS | Samantha Eve Wilkins / Atom Eve | |

=== Web ===
| Year | Title | Role | Notes |
|---|---|---|---|
| 2011 | Don Cheadle Is Captain Planet | Linka | Funny or Die segment |
| 2012 | The Book Club | Penelope | 2 episodes |
| 2013 | Tiny Commando | Mitzi McNeil | 8 episodes |
| 2017 | STRANGER THINGS: A Bad Lip Reading | Nancy Wheeler | Voice |
| 2022 | Vindicators 2: Last Stand Between Earth and Doom | Supernova | Voice, 10 episodes |

=== Stage ===
| Year | Title | Role | Notes |
|---|---|---|---|
| 2006 | cagelove | Katie | Rattlestick Playwrights Theater |
| 2007 | The Fabulous Life of a Size Zero | Girl | DR2 Theatre |
| 2007 | A Feminine Ending | Amanda Blue | Playwrights Horizons |
| 2008 | The Little Flower of East Orange | Nadine / Cathleen | The Public Theater |
| 2018 | Kings | Kate | The Public Theater |

=== Audio ===
| Year | Title | Role | Production company | Notes |
|---|---|---|---|---|
| 2019–2022 | Blood Ties | Eleonore Richland | Wondery | |
| 2021 | Christmas Delivery | Beth Briny | Audible | |
| 2022 | Batman: The Audio Adventures | Harley Quinn/Harleen Quinzel | Blue Ribbon Content | |
| 2022–present | 99% Invisible | —N/a | SiriusXM | Producer and contributor (Episodes: "Mini-Stories: Volume 20," "A River Runs Through Los Angeles," "Mr. Yuk," "Walk of Fame," "Sister Aimee and the Birth of the Megachurch," and "The Bone Wars") |

== Awards and nominations ==
| Year | Award | Category | Work | Result |
|---|---|---|---|---|
| 2010 | Method Fest Award | Best Actress | Nonames | Nominated |
| 2012 | Critics' Choice Television Award | Best Comedy Supporting Actress | Community | Nominated |
| 2012 | TV Guide Fan Favorites Award | Favorite Ensemble | Community | Won |
