= Gardens of the Night =

- Theatrical release poster
- Directed by: Damian Harris
- Written by: Damian Harris
- Produced by: Station3
- Starring: Gillian Jacobs; Evan Ross; Jeremy Sisto; Harold Perrineau; Kyle Gallner; John Malkovich; Kevin Zegers; Tom Arnold
- Cinematography: Paula Huidobro
- Edited by: Michal Shemesh
- Music by: Craig Richey
- Distributed by: City Lights Pictures; Sobini Films; VVS Films
- Release dates: February 9, 2008 (Berlin); October 2, 2008 (United Kingdom); November 21, 2008 (United States)
- Running time: 110 minutes
- Countries: United States; United Kingdom
- Language: English
- Box office: $11,436

Gardens of the Night is a 2008 American drama film, written and directed by Damian Harris, and starring Gillian Jacobs, John Malkovich, Ryan Simpkins, and Tom Arnold.

== Plot ==
In Pennsylvania, eight-year-old Leslie Whitehead (Ryan Simpkins) is kidnapped by Alex (Tom Arnold) and Frank (Kevin Zegers). Alex says he needs help finding his dog, then he and Frank take her to school. While driving, Alex tells Leslie her dad is their boss, thus gaining her trust. After school, Alex and Frank find her again. They lure her into their car with a story about her dad being in trouble, then drug her and take her to their house. They tell Leslie her parents do not want her anymore. As proof, Alex provides the number to her "dad's cell phone", which is actually a payphone. After multiple unanswered calls, she eventually accepts their story.

She and another victim, a young boy named Donnie, are sexually abused and used for child pornography. Their clients include men in positions of authority, such as a judge. As a coping mechanism, Donnie and Leslie pretend they are in an imaginary world based on the stories of Mowgli from The Jungle Book. One day, Leslie, Donnie, Alex, and Frank go to a convenience store, where it becomes apparent Leslie's parents are looking for her because her picture is on milk cartons; however, Leslie does not see them. While Alex is paying for ice cream, the store owner's wife recognizes Leslie as missing and calls the police. When the police show up at Alex and Frank's house, they escape with the children.

Almost nine years later, Leslie (Gillian Jacobs) and Donnie (Evan Ross) are living together on the streets of San Diego, prostituting themselves and stealing. Ostensibly as a way for her to get off the streets, a pimp named Cooper (Shiloh Fernandez) tries to convince Leslie to lure a twelve-year-old girl, Monica, living at a youth shelter into prostitution. Meanwhile, Donnie has fallen in love with Leslie, but she is unsure how to feel because, presumably, she has always just seen him as her brother. She ends up deciding to leave Donnie and goes to the shelter to "turn out" the girl. When Donnie goes looking for Leslie, Cooper tells him she has left him while leading into a fistfight, devastating him. At the last minute, Leslie decides not to turn out Monica and returns her to the shelter. She tries to go back to Donnie, but finds out he has left town without saying where he was going. Having no other choice, Leslie goes back to the shelter to stay. A counselor there (John Malkovich) discovers Leslie is a missing person and tells her her parents have been looking for her all these years, which she finally realizes is true.

Leslie reunites with her parents, along with two siblings born during her absence, and attempts to "return home". However, she is too traumatized after all she has been through and cannot remain in such a normal atmosphere. She leaves in the middle of the night and starts to hitchhike, hoping to find Donnie again. Donnie is shown hitchhiking through Florida, the location of an amusement park where he and Leslie, as young children, promised they would meet if they ever got separated.

== Cast ==
- Gillian Jacobs as Leslie Whitehead
  - Ryan Simpkins as Young Leslie Whitehead
- Tom Arnold as Alex
- Evan Ross as Donnie
  - Jermaine "Scooter" Smith as Young Donnie
- John Malkovich as Michael
- Kevin Zegers as Frank
- Michelle Rodriguez as Lucy
- Jeremy Sisto as Jimmy
- Peta Wilson as Sarah
- Shiloh Fernandez as Cooper
- Harold Perrineau as Orlando
- Troy Rubtash as John "Motel John"
- Raynold Gideon as Judge Feeney
- Cornelia Guest as Mrs. Feeney
- Natalie May as Miss Feeney
- Ben Lin as Pa
- Alice Lo as Ma
- Landall Goolsby as John "Blackberry John"
- Shontea Saldana as "Baby Loco"
- Max Van Ville as Surf
- Kyle Gallner as Rat Boy
- Angel Lacy as The Waitress
- Evan Peters as Rachel / Brian
- Carlie Westman as Monica
- Jeff Swarthout as John "Gay John"
- Jeff Feringa as Booster Lady
- Jim Cody Williams as Leslie's John
- Alexis Jackson as Mia
- Raphael Sbarge as Mr. Whitehead
- Lisa Akey as Mrs. Whitehead
- Gracie Sbarge as Gracie Whitehead
- Ty Simpkins as Dylan Whitehead

== Reception ==
=== Commercial ===
The film was first screened at the Berlin International Film Festival in February 2008, where it was nominated for, but did not win the Golden Bear Award.

The film was then released in the UK and France in October 2008, and in November 2008 was given limited release in New York City. It has never had a nationwide release in the United States.

=== Critical ===
As of June 2020, Gardens of the Night holds a 57% approval rating on the review aggregator Rotten Tomatoes, based on 14 reviews. Metacritic, which uses a weighted average, assigned the film a score of 43 out of 100, based on 5 critics, indicating "mixed or average" reviews.

A review in The New York Times states, "Recovery time is recommended after seeing Gardens of the Night, a harrowing, obliquely told story of kidnapping and forced child prostitution that conjures a world entirely populated by predators and prey."

A review in the New York Observer calls the film "another newfangled kind of horror movie", going on to say, "It is hard to watch, but worth every sobering moment because of the things you learn about one of life’s most grueling subjects." Tom Arnold's performance was praised by many critics including Leslie Felperin of Variety who said "Tom Arnold steals the show".

=== Awards ===
Gardens of the Night won the International Critics Jury award at the 2008 Deauville Festival of American Film. It also won the "Coup de Coeur" of the International Competition and the CinéFemme Award at the Mons (Belgium) International Love Film Festival. The film won the 2008 Audience Award at the Lyon Film festival (Lyfe/ Hors-Ecran). At the Prism Awards, it was nominated for the Best Feature Film (Mental Health) award.
