= Griffin in Summer =

2024 film by Nicholas Colia

- Theatrical release poster
- Directed by: Nicholas Colia
- Written by: Nicholas Colia
- Produced by: Juliet Berman; Bobby Hoppey; Camila Mendes; Rachel Matthews; Matthew Miller
- Starring: Everett Blunck; Owen Teague; Abby Ryder Fortson; Kathryn Newton; Melanie Lynskey
- Cinematography: Felipe Vara de Rey
- Edited by: Sam Levy; Jon Higgins
- Music by: Nami Melumad
- Production companies: Honor Role; Spiral Stairs Entertainment; Coveside Films; Tricky Knot
- Distributed by: Vertical
- Release dates: June 6, 2024 (Tribeca); August 29, 2025 (United States)
- Running time: 90 minutes
- Country: United States
- Language: English

Griffin in Summer is a 2024 American independent coming-of-age comedy drama film. Written and directed by Nicholas Colia in his directorial debut, it stars Everett Blunck, Owen Teague, Abby Ryder Fortson, Kathryn Newton, and Melanie Lynskey. The film centers on Griffin, an aspiring playwright whose plans for the summer take an unexpected turn when a handsome 25-year-old enters his life.

On June 6, 2024, the film had its world premiere at the Tribeca Festival, where it received awards for Best U.S. Narrative Feature, Best Screenplay, and the Special Jury Mention for New Narrative Director. It was released in theaters on August 29, 2025 and premiered on Hulu on December 2.

== Plot ==
Griffin Nafly is a 14-year-old aspiring playwright who dreams of moving to New York City and staging his plays on Broadway. For his summer vacation, Griffin is at work on his latest piece, a divorce drama he describes as "Who's Afraid of Virginia Woolf? meets American Beauty" titled Regrets of Autumn. The play is inspired by the marital troubles between his mother Helen and father Bill. His best friend Kara offers to be the director, while their friends Winnie, Pam, and Tyler fill out the cast. He is dismayed to learn that Kara will be spending part of her summer in Maine with her new boyfriend, but she promises to stay updated by phone.

One day, Griffin sees Helen has hired 25-year-old handyman Brad Rizzo to work on the family pool. Brad is an aspiring actor who has just moved back from New York City after his acting career stalled. Griffin is initially annoyed with Brad when his playwriting is disrupted by the loud techno music he plays outside while working. However, he begins to develop a crush on the oblivious Brad and offers him liquor from his parents' cabinet to get closer to him. Brad and Griffin develop a friendship over their shared interest in art.

Griffin stakes out Brad at a bar, but is disappointed to find that he is there with a girlfriend, Chloe. Nevertheless, he looks for ways to get Brad involved with his play. He abruptly fires Tyler and asks Brad to take over the role. Brad tentatively agrees to do the play after Griffin says he will pay him; his addition to the play causes changes to the writing and the dynamics among the remaining cast. When Kara voices concerns to Griffin about the changes, he insults her and her boyfriend.

In the hopes of breaking up Brad's relationship with Chloe, Griffin sends a sexually explicit email to him under the fake persona of an older woman named "Glenn Bening". (Note: Derived from a picture on Griffin's wall of actresses Glenn Close and Annette Bening.) Chloe sees the email and breaks up with Brad, sending him into a tailspin. A frustrated Brad vents his feelings to Griffin one day by a lake. He sadly confesses that he feels like a failure who had to move back to the suburbs, and that Griffin is probably his only friend there. Griffin reassures Brad that he is not a loser and that he is the best thing that has happened to him.

The following day, when Brad does not show up to rehearsals, he goes to Brad's mom's house to find him. He discovers that Brad has moved back to New York City. In a text message, Brad apologizes for not being able to do Griffin's play, but says that his breakup with Chloe spurred him to rethink his life and make another go at his dreams in NYC. Griffin impulsively takes a train to New York and locates Brad at his apartment. When Brad expresses confusion at his presence, Griffin confesses his feelings for him, including his hopes that the two can get a place when Griffin turns eighteen and create art together. He also admits that he is behind the Glenn Bening email. A startled Brad says he is not gay; he then rejects Griffin and tells him to leave.

A distraught Griffin calls Helen, who has been frantic over his absence. As they reconcile, Griffin admits to transferring money from her bank account to pay Brad, which Helen haltingly forgives. He also makes up with Kara after telling her about Brad. Griffin is worried that the play may be over since his behavior alienated the cast, but Kara urges him to make amends with the group. After Griffin makes a sincere apology to Tyler, Pam, and Winnie, they agree to be in the play again.

At the end of the summer, the friends debut the play at a community center. Griffin has changed some of the lines to reflect him getting over Brad. Afterwards, Winnie introduces him to her friend Mark, who expresses his enjoyment of Griffin's work. Griffin invites Mark to the cast afterparty at his house, and when he sees all his friends happily swimming in the pool, he decides to join them.

== Cast ==
- Everett Blunck as Griffin Nafly
- Owen Teague as Brad Rizzo
- Abby Ryder Fortson as Kara Pointer, Griffin's best friend
- Kathryn Newton as Chloe
- Melanie Lynskey as Helen Nafly, Griffin's mother
- Michael Esper as Bill Nafly, Griffin's father
- Johanna Colón as Winnie Hernandes
- Alivia Bellamy as Pam Vanderworm
- Gordon Rocks as Tyler Smoot-Rigsby
- Fred Bryant Sr. as Uncle Joey
- Ian Hernandez-Oropeza as Mark
- Xavier Wolf as Kevin
- Gabriel J. Perez as The Principal
- Francine Berk as Brad's Mom

== Production ==
The film was shot mainly outside Richmond, Virginia, with some scenes shot in New York City. From conception to completion, it took around five years to make. It was produced by Camila Mendes and Rachel Matthews under their Honor Role banner.

== Release ==
Griffin in Summer had its world premiere at the Tribeca Festival on June 6, 2024, where it won three awards: Best U.S. Narrative Feature, Best Screenplay, and a Special Jury Mention for director Colia. In May 2025, Vertical acquired North American rights to the film. It was given a limited theatrical release on August 29, 2025, and premiered on Hulu on December 2.

== Reception ==
On the review aggregator website Rotten Tomatoes, 94% of 36 critics' reviews are positive. with a high average rating of 8.0 out of 10. Metacritic, which uses a weighted average, assigned the film a score of 73 out of 100, based on 7 critics, indicating "generally favorable" reviews.

The film received a positive reception, with IndieWire's Kate Erbland calling it "a very fine [directorial] debut". Elsewhere, critics compared it favorably to the work of Wes Anderson and Todd Solondz, while praising the performances of Everett Blunck, Owen Teague, and Melanie Lynskey. In Pajiba, Jason Adams wrote, "Griffin is brought to riotous life by Blunck in a triumphant performance of tween awkwardness that should prepare to stand in the pantheon alongside Heather Matarazzo's Dawn Weiner. This movie wouldn't work—and this movie very, very, very much works—if not for Blunck, on whose wispy shoulders the entire thing rests." He called Teague "an absolute riot" and said that Lynskey's performance is like watching her pull "a magic trick".

Loviya Gyarkye of The Hollywood Reporter wrote, "What Griffin in Summer does quite well is take the artistic pursuits of its protagonist seriously...Indeed, [Griffin] channels his capricious temperament onto the page, using the characters in his play to better understand his own heartbreak. It's a comforting reminder of why any of us create in the first place." The New York Times's Chris Azzopardi selected the film as a Critic's Pick, calling it a " winking ode to queer youth who still dream — too fiercely, too soon — amid self-discovery and family disruption". Everett Blunck's performance was named one of the best of the year by Vulture and Colia was nominated for a Film Independent Spirit Award in the Someone to Watch category for his work on the film.
