= Goodbye to All That (film) =

- Film poster
- Directed by: Angus MacLachlan
- Written by: Angus MacLachlan
- Produced by: Anne Carey
- Starring: Paul Schneider; Anna Camp; Michael Chernus; Heather Graham; Ashley Hinshaw; Heather Lawless; Melanie Lynskey; Audrey P. Scott; Amy Sedaris
- Cinematography: Corey Walter
- Edited by: Jennifer Lilly
- Distributed by: IFC Films
- Release date: December 17, 2014
- Running time: 87 minutes
- Country: United States
- Language: English

Goodbye to All That is a 2014 American romantic comedy-drama film, written and directed by Angus MacLachlan in his directorial debut. Starring Paul Schneider and Melanie Lynskey, the film had its world premiere at the 2014 Tribeca Film Festival. It began a limited theatrical run in the United States on December 17, 2014, receiving generally positive reviews.

== Synopsis ==
When Otto's wife suddenly asks for a divorce, he bounces between a social media-fueled search for answers, desperate attempts to reconnect with his daughter, and a fateful reentry into the dating pool.

== Cast ==
- Paul Schneider as Otto Wall
- Melanie Lynskey as Annie Wall
- Audrey P. Scott as Edie Wall
- Anna Camp as Debbie Spangler
- Heather Graham as Stephanie
- Amy Sedaris as Holly
- Michael Chernus as Freddie
- Ashley Hinshaw as Mildred
- Heather Lawless as Lara
- Celia Weston as Joan

== Production ==
The film began production in October 2012 with Epoch Films. Filming took place in and around Winston-Salem, North Carolina. In September 2014, IFC Films bought the distribution rights to the film.

== Reception ==
On the review aggregator website Rotten Tomatoes, 62% of 21 critics' reviews are positive, with an average rating of 6.4/10. Writing for The Hollywood Reporter, John DeFore summarized it as "a surprisingly sexy tale of emotional rebuilding". In his review for Vulture.com, Bilge Ebiri wrote: "Romantic comedies involving people moving on after divorce are a dime a dozen, but rarely are they as generous, sharply observed, and humane [as this]", and referred to the performances of Schneider and Lynskey as "fantastic". Peter Debruge of Variety called it an "amiable indie [that] rewards adult [audiences] who've outgrown cookie-cutter romantic comedies", while noting that Schneider was "irresistible" and describing Lynskey's body language as "heartbreaking ... This is what falling out of love looks like. It's not screaming matches and altercations; it's apathy and indifference".

== Awards ==
Schneider received the award for Best Actor in a U.S. Narrative Feature at the 2014 Tribeca Film Festival, where the film also competed in the Best U.S. Narrative Feature category.
