= Putzel =

- Promotional poster
- Directed by: Jason Chaet
- Written by: Jason Chaet; Rick A. Moore
- Produced by: Jason Chaet; Allegra Cohen; Sheri Davao; Rick A. Moore; Jonathan Gray; Mary Jane Skalski
- Starring: Jack Carpenter; Melanie Lynskey; Susie Essman; John Pankow
- Cinematography: Ryan Samul
- Edited by: Joel Plotch; Federico Rosenzvit
- Music by: Matt Bauder; Jonathan Benedict; Rob Niederpruem
- Production company: Stouthearted Films
- Distributed by: Filmbuff
- Release dates: October 13, 2012 (Woodstock Film Festival); April 8, 2014 (Internet)
- Running time: 88 minutes
- Country: United States
- Language: English
- Budget: $200,000

Putzel is a 2012 American romantic dramedy film. Co-written and directed by Jason Chaet in his feature directorial debut, it stars Jack Carpenter, Melanie Lynskey, John Pankow, and Susie Essman. Putzel premiered at the Woodstock Film Festival on October 13, 2012, and was made purchasable through iTunes on April 8, 2014. Its title derives from the Yiddish word for "little fool".

== Premise ==
For Walter Himmelstein, a young man known affectionately as Putzel, life doesn't stretch too far beyond the family business - a bagel and lox store in uptown Manhattan. Walter's dreams of presiding over his uncle Sid's emporium are disrupted by the arrival of Sally, a beguiling dancer who begins an affair with the much older, very-married Sid. In attempting to sabotage their doomed liaison, Walter finds his world thrown chaotically off course and, after a lifetime of teasing from those around him, starts to recognize that he's more than merely a "putzel".

== Cast ==
- Jack Carpenter as Walter (as Jack T. Carpenter)
- Melanie Lynskey as Sally
- Susie Essman as Gilda
- John Pankow as Sid
- Jarlath Conroy as McGinty
- Adrian Martinez as Hector
- Steve Park as Song
- Armando Riesco as Jake
- Allegra Cohen as Willa
- Fran Kranz as Salmon Guy

== Production ==
The film was shot on location in New York City's Upper West Side in 2011, with principal photography lasting 18 days.

== Release and reception ==
After debuting at the Woodstock Film Festival in October 2012, Putzel was named Best Picture at the Phoenix Film Festival when it screened there the following April. It was generally well received by critics, with The Washington Post comparing it to the works of Woody Allen, calling it "sharp" and "appealingly offbeat"; while Redefine's Allen Huang praised the "delightful" performances of Jack Carpenter and Melanie Lynskey, noting that their interactions were "deftly believable".
