= Lady of the Manor (film) =

- Theatrical release poster
- Directed by: Justin Long; Christian Long
- Written by: Justin Long; Christian Long
- Produced by: Joseph Restaino; Tony Stopperan; Christian Long; Justin Long; Nick Morgulis
- Starring: Melanie Lynskey; Judy Greer; Justin Long; Ryan Phillippe; Luis Guzmán; Patrick Duffy
- Cinematography: Nick Morgulis
- Edited by: Annette Davey
- Music by: Craig Wedren; Bo Boddie
- Production companies: Digital Caviar; Hungry Bull Productions; Mirror Image Films
- Distributed by: Lionsgate
- Release dates: June 10, 2021 (GIFF); September 17, 2021 (United States)
- Running time: 97 minutes
- Country: United States
- Language: English

Lady of the Manor is a 2021 American fantasy comedy film written and directed by brothers Justin Long and Christian Long in their directorial debuts. It stars Melanie Lynskey, Judy Greer, Justin Long, Ryan Phillippe, Luis Guzmán, and Patrick Duffy. The film premiered at the Gasparilla International Film Festival, and was released by Lionsgate on September 17, 2021.

== Plot ==
In Savannah, Georgia, Hannah Kolinsky, a generally unmotivated, oft-intoxicated drug dealer, is mistaken for a sexual predator, arrested, and subsequently dumped by her boyfriend. Her luck appears to change when Tanner, the smarmy but cute heir of an aristocratic Southern family, hires her to take over the role of living history tour guide at his childhood home, an Antebellum mansion. His real reason for doing so is to lure Hannah into bed, having fired the previous guide for rejecting his advances.

Hannah proves to be a slouchy, inarticulate and generally inept tour guide, failing in her attempts to impersonate Lady Wadsworth, the long-deceased matriarch of the house. Much to Hannah's chagrin, it is here that the ghost of Wadsworth starts haunting the premises, chastising the useless employee for doing such a terrible job. Hannah eventually gives in and allows the spectral Lady Wadsworth to tutor her on history and etiquette, and their better qualities begin to rub off on one another as they develop an unlikely friendship.

Steering clear of her lecherous employer after a couple of disastrous encounters, Hannah instead welcomes the nerdish charms of Max, an amiable history professor she meets by chance. She also teams up with Wadsworth to uncover vital evidence that the manor was intended to be bequeathed to Wadsworth's best friend and former maid, whose descendants still work there today. Through a series of detective shenanigans, wrongs are righted, and Max and Hannah become an item.

== Main cast ==
- Melanie Lynskey as Hannah Kolinsky
- Judy Greer as Lady Wadsworth
- Justin Long as Max Plumm
- Ryan Phillippe as Tanner Wadsworth
- Luis Guzmán as Wally
- Patrick Duffy as Grayson Wadsworth

== Production ==
In November 2019, it was announced that Justin and Christian Long would write and direct the film. It was later revealed that Melanie Lynskey, Judy Greer, Long, Ryan Phillippe, Luis Guzmán and Patrick Duffy had joined the cast of the film. Lynskey said that she agreed to take the part because "the thought of being in sweatpants and just acting like I was high for a whole movie was so freeing".

Principal photography began on January 2, 2020, in Tampa, Florida. Filming also took place in St. Petersburg.

== Reception ==
Critics were dismissive of the film's reliance on scatological humour, but Lynskey's performance was well received, with Angie Han of The Hollywood Reporter commenting that she "brings the same airtight commitment to hot mess Hannah that she does to all her varied roles" and finding her chemistry with co-star Judy Greer to be "warm and genuine"; while Screen Rant felt that she "shines as ... the rudderless, classless ... screw-up. [She] unabashedly embraces physical humor ... and really commits to the gags. There are a few laugh-out-loud moments in the film, and Lynskey is at the center of all of them".

On Rotten Tomatoes, the film holds an approval rating of 28% based on 29 reviews, with an average rating of 3.90/10. At Metacritic, the film has a weighted average score of 30 out of 100, based on 6 critics, indicating " generally unfavourable reviews".
