= Helena from the Wedding =

- Directed by: Joseph Infantolino
- Written by: Joseph Infantolino
- Produced by: Alexa L Fogel; Brendan Mason
- Starring: Lee Tergesen; Melanie Lynskey; Paul Fitzgerald; Gillian Jacobs; Dominic Fumusa; Corey Stoll; Jessica Hecht; Dagmara Dominczyk
- Cinematography: Stephen Kazmierski
- Edited by: Jennifer Lilly
- Release date: March 14, 2010 (SXSW)
- Running time: 89 minutes
- Country: United States
- Language: English

Helena from the Wedding is a 2010 American drama film directed by Joseph Infantolino. It stars Lee Tergesen, Melanie Lynskey and Gillian Jacobs. The film was released theatrically in the United States on November 12, 2010.

== Synopsis ==
Eight people, most approaching early 'mid-life' crises, spend a weekend together struggling with their insecurities.

== Plot ==
Recently married Alex, 39, a lawyer by schooling, but currently an unsuccessful playwright, and Alice, his younger wife by about five years, invite three other couples to Alex's parents cabin in the snowy woods for New Year's weekend. Don and Lynn arrive first, Don bringing party hats, but forgetting the wine. Lynn, also a lawyer, recently received a better position, and, though she tells Alice that Don, a writer, is good with the kids, she complains about his bad business ideas. Nick, recently separated from his wife, arrives next but alone, claiming his new, much younger girlfriend, is sick and couldn't make it to the event. While Alice and Lynn chat in the kitchen making dinner, the guys are outside standing around the barbecue, listening to Don's latest scheme: "The Naked Maid" cleaning service he would like to start. Also mentioned is his old Jeep that he has to keep in constant repair so that he has "something to do".

Just before dinner, Alice and Alex are alone when she, displaying her insecurity, asks him "Do I look okay?", and he replies "You look amazing".

During dinner, when it becomes clear Lynn is an alcoholic, and that Don and Lynn's relationship is rather strained, a phone call from Eve of the third couple lets everybody know that they are bringing along Helena, "from the wedding". After dinner and more wine-drinking, Don and Lynn head off to bed. Alice excuses herself to retire too, and Alex goes with her to tuck her in, as Don and Lynn noisily have sex upstairs. Alex returns to Nick to converse, but the noise drives them outside, where Nick discloses that his girlfriend has left him.

Back inside, over backgammon, Nick asks about Helena. Alex tells him she was a bridesmaid along with Alice at Eve's wedding. Nick senses Alex was attracted to her, though he was engaged to Alice at time. He says "You tried to fuck her!" but Alex replies, "Will you keep it down ... No, I didn't", and they both retire for the night.

At breakfast the next day, Don and Lynn find out about Nick's break-up. Eve, pregnant, and Steven, a wealthy lawyer, arrive with Helena, as Nick descends from upstairs. Both Nick and Alex are clearly distracted by the presence of younger Helena, a very attractive British model. A bit later, Lynn, asserting her dominance in the relationship, insists Don fetch wine and cigarettes from the store, even though there is plenty of wine in the cabin.

Alice and Eve go for a walk, while Alex, Nick and Steven go for a hike. Even though it is morning, Lynn heads back to bed for a nap, while Helena stays indoors to read.

Eve tell Alice she thinks Steven is having an affair, after finding condoms in his briefcase. Eve asks Alice about having kids, telling her "Well, you have a little time left; enjoy the honeymoon period, as it is brief." Nick begs off the hike, to return to the cabin to hopefully connect with Helena (to no avail). Alex asks Steven for a job, but the prospects aren't good for someone his age and his academic credentials, i.e., the law school he attended. All return to the cabin, where Alex tells Alice that Steven is a ‘douche-bag’. Don, Lynn, Alice, Nick and Steven head out to 4-wheel in the snow. Eve naps, while Alex stays behind to hopefully somehow connect with Helena (to no avail). Helena takes a bath, and Alex grabs a pair of binoculars, goes outside, and attempts to peep at her through the bathroom window, then he lays in the snow, staring into the sky, fantasizing or thinking.

As Helena exits the bath, wrapped in a towel, Alice, who has returned alone, catches Alex, unaware, looking at Helena, and is distressed.

That night, everybody parties and gets drunk, and several do some cocaine. Outside (in Don's Jeep) after doing cocaine, Nick hits on Helena, but she rebuffs him. Then he asks for a kiss on the cheek, and she again says no. Back inside, as music blares, Alex watches Alice and then Helena dancing. Lynn tells Don to go get cigarettes again, but he is drunk. Alice and Eve go to the store, Eve driving. They are delayed at the store due to a dead battery. Alex, drunk, gets annoyed and wants to check on the ladies, but his friends stop him from driving. Then he attempts to attack Steven, as Lynn and Helena watch, but the other two stop him. Nick talks to Alex, and he calms down. Alex apologizes to Steven, and Steven tells him he has no sway in hiring Alex, as his partners hate him. They haze him, including putting condoms in his briefcase. Alex realizes Steven is just as hapless as he is.

Fireworks are set alight as midnight approaches; the group watches, and Eve and Alice return to the cabin. Alex and Alice go to their bedroom, where they look at each other and touch, resigned to their loving relationship.

== Cast ==
- Lee Tergesen as Alex Javal
- Melanie Lynskey as Alice Javal
- Paul Fitzgerald as Nick
- Jessica Hecht as Lynn
- Dominic Fumusa as Don
- Dagmara Dominczyk as Eve
- Corey Stoll as Steven
- Gillian Jacobs as Helena

== Production ==
The movie was filmed primarily in Hancock and Walton, New York.

== Critical reception ==
The film received average reviews from critics. Review aggregation website Rotten Tomatoes gives the film a score of 50% based on reviews from 10 critics, with an average rating of 4.9 out of 10.

== Box office ==
Shown in one theater for 21 days, the film grossed just over $4,000.

== Home media ==
'Helena from the Wedding' was released on DVD in the U.S. on March 8, 2011.
