= The Great & the Small =

- Directed by: Dusty Bias
- Written by: Dusty Bias
- Produced by: Dusty Bias
- Starring: Nick Fink; Ritchie Coster; Melanie Lynskey; Louisa Krause; Ann Dowd
- Production companies: Cervidae Films; Fahrenheit Films
- Release date: 31 March 2016 (Sonoma); 21 February 2017 (VOD)
- Running time: 104 minutes
- Country: United States
- Language: English

The Great & the Small is a 2016 American independent drama film. Written and directed by Dusty Bias, it stars Nick Fink, Ritchie Coster, Melanie Lynskey, Louisa Krause, and Ann Dowd.

== Premise ==
Twenty-six year old Scott is living on the streets and trying to find his way back into society while on probation for petty crimes. He attempts to navigate his relationship with his two-bit criminal of a boss and an enigmatic detective, while at the same time winning back the heart of his ex-girlfriend, a working single mom.

== Cast ==
- Nick Fink as Scott
- Ritchie Coster as Richie
- Melanie Lynskey as Margaret
- Louisa Krause as Nessa
- Ann Dowd as Detective Dupre

== Awards ==
The film received the Audience Choice prize and the Jury Award for Best American Independent Feature at the 2016 Sonoma International Film Festival.

== Reception ==
On Rotten Tomatoes the film has 2 critic reviews, both positive. Gary Goldstein, writing for the Los Angeles Times, felt that it "sneaks in quite a bit of depth and emotional punch," while Joe Leydon of Variety called the film "At once starkly eccentric and deeply humane," adding that Lynskey's portrayal of "sad-eyed schoolteacher" Margaret was "quietly devastating."
