= Redefine (magazine) =

Redefine Magazine is an independent online publication which began in May 2004, and it is dedicated to music, visual art, and film, and the ways in which the disciplines merge. The magazine also has a social aspect to it, and routinely highlights non-profit and humanitarian causes. It is based in Seattle, Washington. As of 2012, its mission is "conscious growth through long-form arts journalism."

The publication began as a web publication, moved to a free print publication distributed in the Pacific Northwest, and was a print magazine sold in bookstores throughout major cities in the United States and Canada. Early issues were centered on a color theme, and its print layouts featured a hand-crafted type of feel. As of 2009, it is a web-only publication.

It went in hiatus in 2016 and returned in 2020.
