= The Intervention (film) =

2016 American film directed by Clea DuVall

- Theatrical release poster
- Directed by: Clea DuVall
- Written by: Clea DuVall
- Produced by: Paul Bernon; Sev Ohanian; Sam Slater
- Starring: Clea DuVall; Melanie Lynskey; Natasha Lyonne; Vincent Piazza; Jason Ritter; Ben Schwartz; Alia Shawkat; Cobie Smulders
- Cinematography: Polly Morgan
- Edited by: Tamara Meem
- Music by: Sara Quin
- Production company: Burn Later Productions
- Distributed by: Samuel Goldwyn Films; Paramount Pictures
- Release dates: January 26, 2016 (Sundance Film Festival); August 26, 2016 (United States)
- Running time: 88 minutes
- Country: United States
- Language: English
- Budget: $450,000
- Box office: $32,919

The Intervention is a 2016 American independent dramedy film, written and directed by Clea DuVall in her feature directorial debut. It stars DuVall, Melanie Lynskey, Natasha Lyonne, Vincent Piazza, Jason Ritter, Ben Schwartz, Alia Shawkat, and Cobie Smulders. The film debuted at Sundance on January 26, 2016, and began a limited theatrical run on August 26, 2016, premiering on VOD the same day. It received generally positive reviews from critics.

== Synopsis ==
A gang of old friends gave a weekend escape. The event takes a sour turn when two of them —married couple Ruby and Peter (Cobie Smulders and Vincent Piazza)— discover that the entire trip has been orchestrated by Annie (Melanie Lynskey), a control freak with a spiralling booze problem. She convinced herself that the couple are desperately unhappy in their relationship and that an "intervention" is needed to remedy it. They eventually realize that Annie's own problems are just as big and in as dire need of attention as Ruby and Peter's.

== Cast ==
- Clea DuVall as Jessie, an independent-minded career woman and Sarah's girlfriend. DuVall wrote the character of Jessie with the intention of playing the role herself, although she said after the film's release that she would not cast herself again in a film she was directing due to the stress of directing and acting at the same time. Being an open lesbian herself, Duvall wrote Jessie as gay because she wanted to normalize gay relationships and feature "a gay couple in a movie where it's not about them being gay".
- Melanie Lynskey as Annie, a neurotic, insecure alcoholic who is the mastermind of the "marriage intervention" and Matt's fiancée. DuVall wrote The Intervention for Lynskey, who is a close friend of hers. She wrote the role of Annie with Lynskey in mind, and Lynskey read DuVall's drafts of the screenplay as she wrote it. Lynskey had three therapy sessions before the film went into production to prepare herself for working with her friend and communicating with each other professionally as actor and director. She said afterwards, "I didn't want anything to happen to our friendship and a big challenge was being able to stick up for myself and my perspective in regard to the script and this character."
- Alia Shawkat as Lola, a free-spirited 22-year-old hippie and Jack's girlfriend. Shawkat is also a longtime friend of DuVall's. She was the second actor to be cast, after Lynskey.
- Cobie Smulders as Ruby, the long-suffering wife of the career-minded Peter. Smulders broke her leg shortly before filming was scheduled to begin. Instead of replacing her or choosing camera angles that would hide her injury, DuVall chose to include it in the story. Smulders felt that it "added more vulnerability" to her character and DuVall later described it as "one of [her] favorite things about the movie".
- Natasha Lyonne as Sarah, Jessie's girlfriend. Lyonne, DuVall and Lynskey had been close friends since appearing together in the 1999 comedy But I'm a Cheerleader. DuVall felt that their history of playing lovers in But I'm a Cheerleader, as well as their real-life friendship, "really lent itself to be able to play girlfriends in a way that felt authentic".
- Jason Ritter as Matt, Annie's fiancée. Ritter is Lynskey's real-life partner. DuVall cast him as Matt because she had difficulty writing the part and trusted that he could "make it feel like a complete character".
- Ben Schwartz as Jack, a free-spirited hippie type whose wife Mary died a year and a half ago. He is dating 22-year-old Lola with the hopes of something more serious.
- Vincent Piazza as Peter, a workaholic businessman and Ruby's husband. DuVall described Piazza as "one of the sweetest guys I've ever met in my entire life" and said that because of his nature, "there were times [during filming] he would be too nice, and I would have to convince him to be an asshole."

== Production ==
DuVall started writing The Intervention in 2012. The idea for a story based around a marital intervention came partly from DuVall's own life; she said that she was too judgmental of her friends' lives and reluctant to face her own problems. She did not initially intend to direct the script she had written for The Intervention, but changed her mind while trying to find another director.

Four members of the main cast (Lynskey, Lyonne, Ritter and Shawkat) were friends of DuVall's. The other three (Smulders, Piazza and Schwartz) were cast through "a connection to someone else in the cast".

The film was produced by Sam Slater and Paul Bernon of Burn Later Productions, along with Sev Ohanian. Bernon and Slater became involved after asking DuVall's agency if they had any film projects in need of financing, and Ohanian was brought to the project by Mel Eslyn, who served as an executive producer. DuVall said that the process of finding investors was fast and relatively easy, which she attributed to the film's very low budget. The film's financing was secured six months after DuVall had finished writing the script, and filming began three months later.

The film was shot in Savannah, Georgia, over the course of 18 days in the summer of 2015. It was filmed in particularly hot weather, which caused the cinematographer, Polly Morgan, to develop heat stroke. The house where the majority of filming took place repeatedly lost power, leaving the cast and crew without air conditioning and running water on set. DuVall later said that the heat and the problems it caused "probably helped add tension to the scenes".

Each scene was shot with two cameras simultaneously, with one focused on the speaking character and the other focused on those who were not speaking. The filmmakers chose not to have playback monitors on set in order to save time and money; DuVall said that this made it difficult to act and direct at the same time since she was unable to watch scenes that required her to be in front of the camera.

The film was scored by Sara Quin of Tegan and Sara, making her debut as a film composer. DuVall had collaborated with Tegan and Sara several times before as a director of their music videos. She wanted Quin to create a "non-traditional" film score, saying, "A big reason why I wanted to work with Sara on the score is because she hasn't done it before. I wanted something that didn't sound like the scores I am used to hearing."

Tegan and Sara also wrote and performed a song for the film, titled "Fade Out". When DuVall approached her about The Intervention, Sara Quin had already written a rough version of the song; she rewrote some of the lyrics to fit with the film. DuVall chose to only feature songs with female vocalists on the film's soundtrack.

== Release ==
The Intervention had its world premiere at the 2016 Sundance Film Festival on January 26, 2016, where Lynskey received a Special Jury Award for Individual Performance. Two days after the premiere, it was announced that Paramount Pictures had acquired worldwide distribution rights for around $2.5 million. The film screened at the Seattle International Film Festival on May 28, 2016, and served as the opening night film for Outfest on July 7, 2016. It was released in a limited release in theaters and on video on demand through iTunes on August 26, 2016. Its theatrical run lasted for a single week; it grossed $32,919 from 17 theaters.

== Reception ==
The Intervention received mostly positive reviews from critics. It currently holds a 78% rating on review aggregator Rotten Tomatoes, based on 51 reviews, with an average of 6.41/10. The website's critical consensus reads, "The Intervention's familiar plot is enlivened by complex character dynamics and a likable cast." On Metacritic, the film holds a rating of 57 out of 100, based on 16 critics.

Dennis Harvey of Variety gave a positive review, writing, "Clea DuVall's debut as writer-director breaks no new ground in themes or execution, but is pleasingly accomplished on all levels." IndieWire's Kate Erbland gave the film a B+ rating, describing it as "a sharp-tongued and smart observational comedy" and praising DuVall's "crisp and smart" direction. Robert Abele of the Los Angeles Times found the film "unfussy, dryly amusing and sincere", and praised the performances of Lynskey and Smulders. Moira Macdonald of The Seattle Times called the film "confident and accomplished" and compared it favorably to The Big Chill. In a review for Entertainment Weekly, Kevin P. Sullivan gave the film a B rating, writing, "The script wobbles between heavy-handed and touching, but the result is a pleasantly nostalgic throwback that's saved from its copy-cat tendencies by charismatic actors."

On the other hand, The Hollywood Reporter's Todd McCarthy found the film "bland and without consequence" and opined that DuVall ought to have brought on a co-writer to "create more distinctive characters and dialogue". Nigel M. Smith of The Guardian gave the film 2 out of 5 stars, criticizing DuVall's "misjudgment of tone" in writing it as a comedy rather than fully exploring the "messed up" characters. Writing for Slant Magazine, Diego Semerene called the film's premise unoriginal and formulaic, ultimately describing it as "intolerable".
