= The Big Ask (film) =

- Theatrical release poster
- Directed by: Thomas Beatty; Rebecca Fishman
- Written by: Thomas Beatty
- Produced by: Thomas Beatty; Jennifer Westin
- Starring: Gillian Jacobs; Zachary Knighton; David Krumholtz; Melanie Lynskey; Ahna O'Reilly; Jason Ritter; Dale Dickey; French Stewart; Ned Beatty
- Cinematography: Aaron Kovalchik
- Edited by: Eric Potter
- Music by: Julian Wass
- Production companies: Covert Productions; Sparkhouse Media
- Distributed by: Tribeca Film
- Release dates: June 1, 2013 (SIFF); May 20, 2014 (limited)
- Running time: 90 minutes
- Country: United States
- Language: English

Gillian Jacobs and Melanie Lynskey discussing The Big Ask (at the time called Teddy Bears) in 2013

The Big Ask (originally titled Teddy Bears) is a 2013 American independent black comedy-drama film. Directed by Thomas Beatty and Rebecca Fishman (from a script by Beatty), it stars Gillian Jacobs, Zachary Knighton, David Krumholtz, Melanie Lynskey, Ahna O'Reilly, and Jason Ritter. The film was released theatrically in the United States on May 20, 2014.

== Synopsis ==
Three couples head to the desert to support their friend, Andrew (Krumholtz), after the death of his mother. But there's fallout amidst the group when his intentions become clear: he wants to sleep with each of his best friends' girlfriends—at the same time.

== Cast ==
- Gillian Jacobs as Emily
- Zachary Knighton as Dave
- David Krumholtz as Andrew
- Melanie Lynskey as Hannah
- Ahna O'Reilly as Zoe
- Jason Ritter as Owen
- Dale Dickey as Lori
- French Stewart as Rich
- Ned Beatty as Old Man Carl

== Production ==
=== Writing ===
The film's concept arose from a "rocky" period in the relationship of writer/director Beatty and his wife, co-director Fishman.

=== Filming ===
Principal photography took place in and around Twentynine Palms, California—including Joshua Tree National Park—and lasted 17 days.

=== Editing ===
The first cut of the film was over three hours in length. "It was a long process", according to Beatty. "We had two movies [and] we cut a whole movie out".

== Release and reception ==
The Big Ask premiered at the Seattle International Film Festival on June 1, 2013 under its original title, Teddy Bears, which derived from a nickname given by one of the film's characters to the unusual-looking cacti growing at Joshua Tree. Regarding the title change—a decision imposed by distributor Tribeca Films—star David Krumholtz said, "I think [they] felt the [original] title [didn't] really tell you what the film was ... but the problem is [that people keep asking me] what I have coming out and I say "The Big Ask", and they think I'm saying "The Big Ass". So I keep getting, "You're in a movie called 'The Big Ass?'"

Ask began a limited theatrical release on May 20, 2014. It received a mixed reception from critics, with some feeling it wasted the potential of its unique premise; while others praised the film's writing and performances, especially Lynskey's. It holds a 58% approval rating on Rotten Tomatoes, based on 12 reviews.
