= Pike River (film) =

- Theatrical release poster
- Directed by: Robert Sarkies
- Written by: Fiona Samuel
- Produced by: Vicky Pope; Timothy White; Robert Sarkies
- Starring: Melanie Lynskey; Robyn Malcolm
- Cinematography: Gin Loane
- Edited by: Peter Roberts
- Music by: Karl Sölve Steven
- Production company: New Zealand Film Commission
- Distributed by: Madman Entertainment
- Release date: 7 June 2025 (Sydney Film Festival)
- Running time: 131 minutes
- Country: New Zealand
- Language: English
- Box office: US$936,676

Pike River is a 2025 New Zealand drama film. Directed by Robert Sarkies, it stars Melanie Lynskey and Robyn Malcolm.

== Premise ==
Based on the Pike River Mine disaster of 2010, the story follows the subsequent, years-long battle for justice led by Anna Osborne and Sonya Rockhouse, two friends whose respective husband and son—along with 27 other workers—were killed during an underground explosion.

== Cast ==
- Melanie Lynskey as Anna Osborne
- Robyn Malcolm as Sonya Rockhouse
- Lucy Lawless as Helen Kelly
- Erroll Shand as Pete Cahill
- Madeleine McCarthy as Alisha Osborne
- Ben Porter as Rob Osborne
- John Leigh as Milton Osborne
- Peter Tait as Rowdy Durbridge
- Jordan Mooney as Tony Sutorius
- Tim Gordon as Bernie Monk
- Elizabeth Hawthorne as Kath Monk
- Hamish McEwen as Daniel Rockhouse
- Richard Crouchley as Ben Rockhouse
- Jeff Kingsford-Brown as Neville Rockhouse
- Ian Mune as "Rocky" Rockhouse

== Production ==
Pike River was shot on location in Greymouth, New Zealand, between November and December 2023. Speaking to Variety in May 2024, producer Vicky Pope described the film as "Erin Brockovich meets Norma Rae – New Zealand's own version, gutsy and real", and said of the casting, "We are so thrilled about the powerhouse partnership of [Lynskey] and [Malcolm] ... two incredible actresses playing two incredible women".

== Release ==
The film premiered at the Sydney Film Festival on 7 June 2025, ahead of its theatrical release in New Zealand later in the year.

== Reception ==
=== Critical reception ===
On the review aggregator website Rotten Tomatoes, 88% of 17 critics' reviews are positive.

Writing for RogerEbert.com, Cortlyn Kelly commented, "Pike River excellently explores the nonlinear experience of grief and how, as a result, relationships can be rocky, going through hills and valleys", adding that the "magnificent performances from Melanie Lynskey and Robyn Malcolm" are strengthened by their "magnetic chemistry". In a positive review for The Guardian, Cath Clarke wrote, "The story is told with restraint, in meticulous detail [...] without any Erin Brockovich-type feelgood emotion, never losing sight of the heartbreak and devastation".

Richard Phillips of the Trotskyist website World Socialist Web Site criticised the film, claiming that director Robert Sarkies did not consult with all the Pike River miners' families during production. He also criticised it for failing to acknowledge the Sixth Labour Government's aborted re-entry of Pike River Mine in 2021.

=== Accolades ===
Pike River won six awards at the 2026 New Zealand Screen Awards on 19 November 2026. These included "Best Feature Film" (Vicky Pope and Timothy White), "Best Director - Drama Feature" (Robert Sarkies), "Best Editing - Drama Feature" (Peter Roberts), "Best Sound - Feature" (Nick Burton, Michael Hedges, Jordan Smith, Alexis Feodoroff, Luanda Barnes and Gareth Van Niekerk), "Best Original Score - Feature" (Karl Sölve Steven), and "Best Script - Feature" (Fiona Samuel).
