= Essex (disambiguation) =

Essex is the name of a county in England, named after the ancient Kingdom of Essex. A number of places and things have been named after it.

== People ==
- Essex (surname)
- Earl of Essex, the English Earls of Essex

== Places ==
=== Place names ===
==== In Canada ====
- Essex, Ontario
- Essex County, Ontario
- Essex (federal electoral district)
- Essex (provincial electoral district)
- Essex (Province of Canada electoral district)

==== In Ireland ====
- Essex Quay

==== In the United Kingdom ====
- Essex (UK Parliament constituency)

==== In the United States ====
- Essex, California
- Essex, Connecticut
- Essex, Illinois
- Essex, Iowa
- Essex, Maryland
- Essex, Massachusetts, a New England town
  - Essex (CDP), Massachusetts, the main village in the town
- Essex, Montana
- Essex, Missouri
- Essex, New York
- Essex, North Carolina
- Essex, Ohio
- Essex, Vermont
- Essex County, Massachusetts
- Essex County, New Jersey
- Essex County, New York
- Essex County, Vermont
- Essex County, Virginia
- Essex Junction, Vermont
- Essex Township, Kankakee County, Illinois
- Essex Township, Stark County, Illinois
- Essex Township, Michigan (in Clinton County)
- Essexville, Michigan (in Bay County)

=== Structures ===
- Essex Crossing, a Manhattan redevelopment project
- Essex Reef Light, was a light in Essex, Connecticut on the Connecticut River

=== Transportation-related ===
- Essex station (disambiguation), stations of the name
- Essex Street (disambiguation), streets of the same name.

== Art, entertainment, and media ==
- Essex (album), a 1994 album by Alison Moyet
- Essex Records, a record label
- The Essex, a 1960s American R&B vocal group

== Motor vehicles ==
- Essex (automobile) or Essex Motor Car, an affiliate of Hudson Motors, 1919–1932
- Ford Essex V4 engine
- Ford Essex V6 engine (disambiguation)

== Ships ==
- HMS Essex, five ships of the Royal Navy
- USS Essex, five ships of the US Navy
  - Essex class aircraft carrier, named for the lead ship
- Essex (ship), various civilian ships

=== Fictional ===
- HMS Essex, a fictional Royal Navy warship from the 2017 film Pirates of the Caribbean: Dead Men Tell No Tales

== Other uses ==
- Essex Property Trust, a publicly traded real estate investment trust that invests in apartments
- Essex (pig), a breed of domestic pig
- Essex, a brand of piano designed by Steinway & Sons
- Essex girl, a British stereotype
- Essex man, a British stereotype
- Essex Overseas Petroleum Corporation, a former oil trading company owned by David Thieme
- University of Essex
