= David Farragut =

United States Navy admiral (1801–1870)

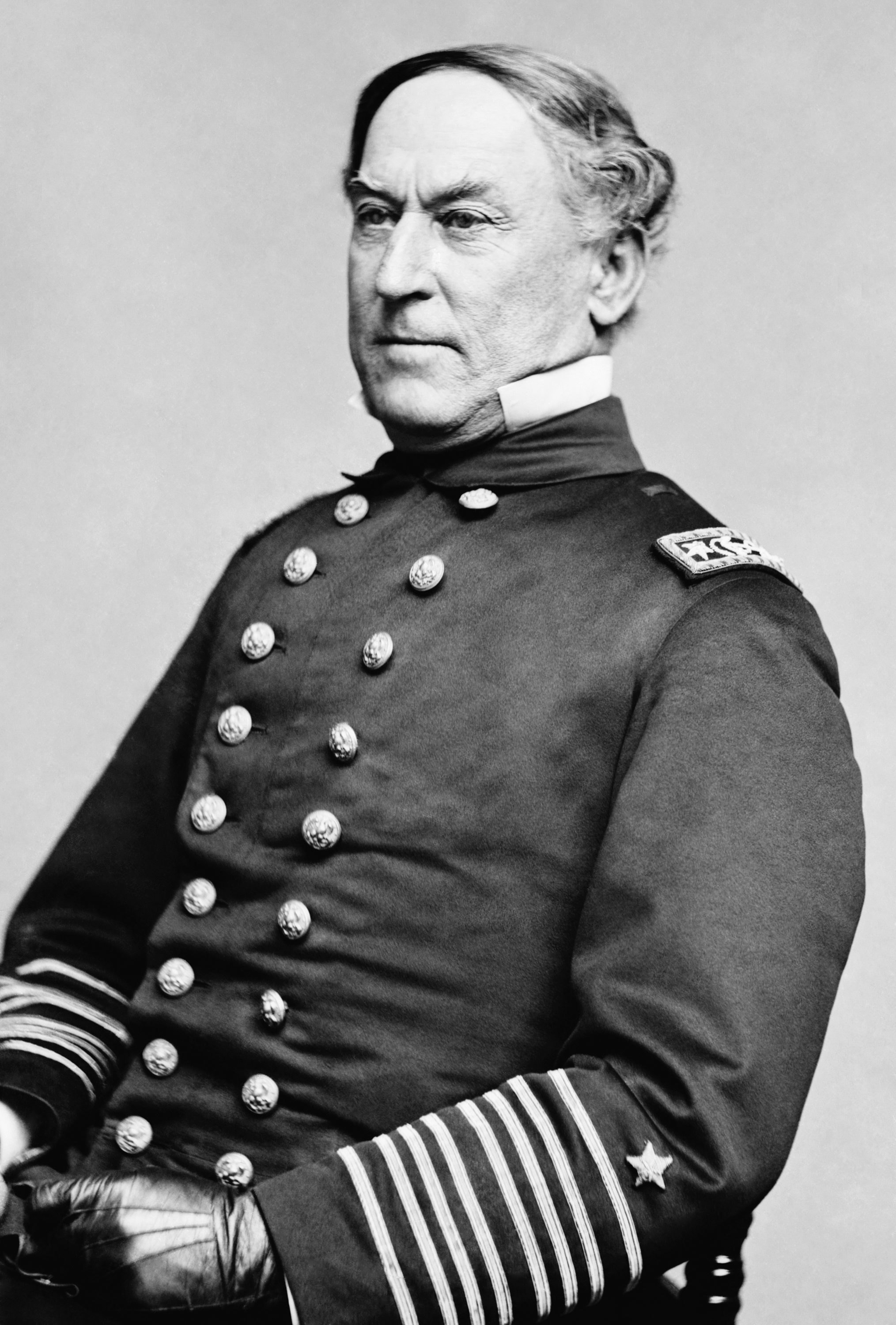
- Farragut as a rear admiral, c. 1862–1864
- Born: James Glasgow Farragut; July 5, 1801 near Farragut, Tennessee (at Lowe's Ferry)
- Died: August 14, 1870 (aged 69); Portsmouth Naval Shipyard
- Burial place: Woodlawn Cemetery, the Bronx
- Military career
- Allegiance: United States (Union)
- Branch: United States Navy (Union Navy)
- Service years: 1810–1870
- Rank: Admiral
- Conflicts: War of 1812; USS Essex vs. HMS Alert; Action off Charles Island; Nuku Hiva Campaign; Battle of Valparaiso (WIA) (POW); West Indies anti-piracy operations; Mexican–American War; American Civil War; Battle of Forts Jackson and St. Philip; Battle of New Orleans; Siege of Vicksburg; Siege of Port Hudson; Battle of Mobile Bay

Signature
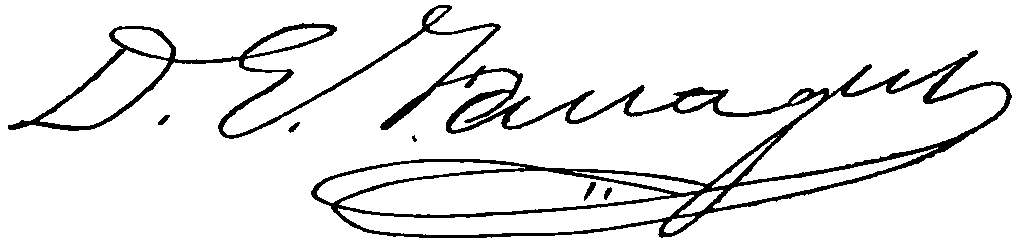

David Glasgow Farragut (/ˈfærəɡət/; also spelled Glascoe; July 5, 1801 – August 14, 1870) was a flag officer of the United States Navy during the American Civil War. He was the first rear admiral, vice admiral, and admiral in the United States Navy. He is remembered in U.S. Navy tradition for his bold order at the Battle of Mobile Bay, usually abbreviated to "Damn the torpedoes ... full speed ahead."

Farragut was born in Knoxville, Tennessee, and raised by naval officer David Porter after the death of his mother. When he was 11 years old, Farragut served in the War of 1812 under the command of his adoptive father. He received his first command in 1823 at age 22, and went on to participate in anti-piracy operations in the Caribbean Sea. He then served in the Mexican–American War under the command of Matthew C. Perry, participating in the blockade of Tuxpan. After the war, he oversaw the construction of the Mare Island Navy Yard (now Mare Island Naval Shipyard), which was the first U.S. Navy base established on the Pacific Ocean.

Farragut resided in Norfolk, Virginia, prior to the Civil War, but he was a Southern Unionist who strongly opposed Southern secession and remained loyal to the Union after the outbreak of the Civil War. He was assigned command of an attack on the important Confederate port city of New Orleans, defeating the Confederates at the Battle of Forts Jackson and St. Philip. He captured New Orleans in April 1862. He was promoted to rear admiral after the battle and helped extend Union control up along the Mississippi River, participating in the siege of Port Hudson. He then led a successful attack on Mobile Bay, home to the last major Confederate port on the Gulf of Mexico. Farragut was promoted to admiral following the end of the Civil War and remained on active duty until his death in 1870.

== Early life ==
Coat of Arms of David Farragut

James Glasgow Farragut was born in 1801 to George Farragut (born Jordi Farragut Mesquida, 1755–1817), a Spanish Balearic merchant captain from the Mediterranean island of Menorca, and his wife Elizabeth (née Shine, 1765–1808), of North Carolina Scotch-Irish American descent, at Lowe's Ferry on the Holston River in Tennessee. It was a few miles southeast of Campbell's Station, near Knoxville.

After serving in the Spanish merchant marine, George Farragut immigrated to North America in 1776 and served as a naval officer during the American Revolutionary War. He was first with the South Carolina Navy, then with the Continental Navy. George and Elizabeth moved west to Tennessee after his service in the Revolution, where he operated Lowe's Ferry and served as a cavalry officer in the Tennessee militia.

In 1805, George accepted a position at the U.S. port of New Orleans. He traveled there first and his family followed in a 1,700-mile (2,700 km) flatboat journey guided by hired rivermen. It was four-year-old James's first voyage. The family was still living in New Orleans when Elizabeth died of yellow fever. George Farragut made plans to place the young children with friends and family who could better care for them.

In 1808, after his mother's death, James agreed to live with United States Navy officer David Porter, whose father had served with George Farragut during the Revolution. In 1812, he adopted the name "David" in honor of his foster father, with whom he went to sea late in 1810. David Farragut grew up in a naval family, with foster brothers David Dixon Porter, a future Civil War admiral, and William D. Porter, who became a Commodore.

== Career ==
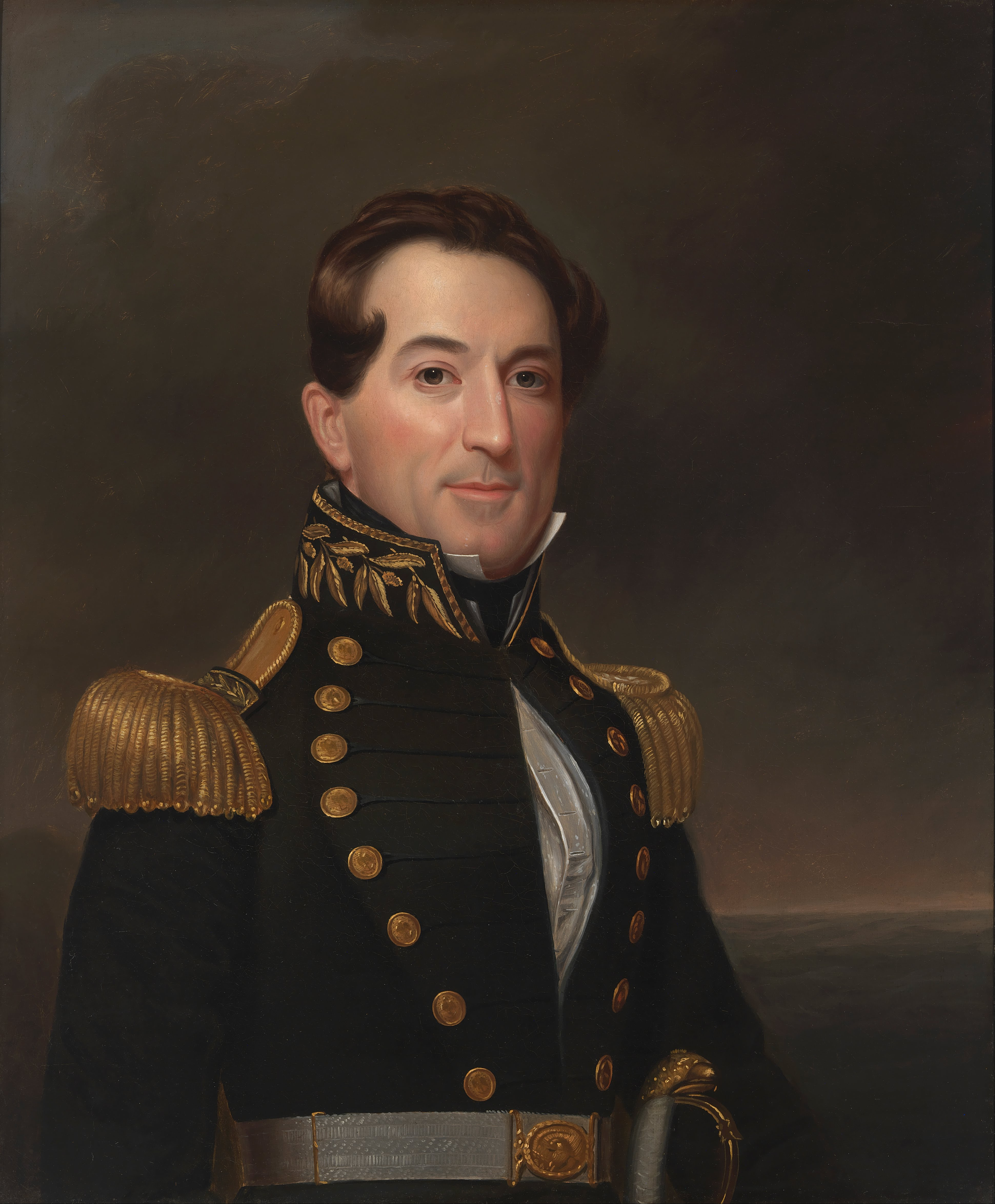
Farragut as he appears in the National Portrait Gallery in Washington, D.C.

Farragut's naval career began as a midshipman when he was nine years old, and continued for 60 years until his death at the age of 69. This included service in several wars, most notably during the American Civil War, where he gained fame for winning several decisive naval battles.

=== War of 1812 ===
Farragut's naval career began when he was added to the U.S. Navy's rolls with the rank of "boy" in the spring of 1810. Through the influence of his foster father, Farragut was warranted a midshipman in the U.S. Navy on December 17, 1810, at the age of nine. (Note: Some sources place the age at eleven.) A prize master by the age of 11, Farragut fought in the War of 1812, serving under Captain Porter, his foster father. While serving aboard the frigate USS Essex, Farragut participated in the capture of HMS Alert on August 13, 1812, He helped to establish America's first naval base and colony in the Pacific, named Fort Madison, during the ill-fated Nuku Hiva Campaign in the Marquesas Islands. At the same time, the Americans battled the hostile tribes on the islands with the help of their Te I'i allies.

Farragut was 11 years old when, during the War of 1812, he was given the assignment to bring a ship captured by the Essex safely to port. He was wounded and captured while serving on the Essex during the engagement at Valparaíso Bay, Chile, against the British on March 28, 1814.

=== West Indies ===
In 1823, Farragut was placed in command of USS Ferret, which was his first command of a U.S. naval vessel. He served in the Mosquito Fleet, a fleet of ships fitted out to fight pirates in the Caribbean Sea. After the Ferret was lost in a storm, Farragut appealed to Porter for new orders and was assigned as an officer on Greyhound, one of the smaller vessels, commanded by John Porter, brother of David Porter. On February 14, 1823, the fleet set sail for the West Indies where, for the next six months, they would drive the pirates off the sea, and rout them from their hiding places in among the islands. He finished the West Indies campaign as executive officer aboard the USS Experiment. Farragut was promoted to lieutenant in 1825.

=== Mexican–American War ===
In 1847, Farragut, now a commander, took command of the sloop-of-war USS Saratoga when she was recommissioned at Norfolk Navy Yard in Norfolk, Virginia. Assigned to the Home Squadron for service in the Mexican–American War, Saratoga departed Norfolk on March 29, 1847, bound for the Gulf of Mexico under Farragut's command and upon arriving off Veracruz, Mexico, on April 26, 1847, reported to the squadron's commander, Commodore Matthew C. Perry, for duty. On April 29, Perry ordered Farragut to sail Saratoga 150 nautical miles (170 mi; 280 km) to the north to blockade Tuxpan, where she operated from April 30 to July 12 before Farragut returned to Veracruz. About two weeks later, Farragut began a round-trip voyage to carry dispatches to Tabasco, returning to Veracruz on August 11, 1847. On September 1, 1847, Farragut and Saratoga returned to blockade duty off Tuxpan, remaining there for two months despite a yellow fever outbreak on board. Farragut then brought the ship back to Veracruz and, after a month there, got underway for the Pensacola Navy Yard in Pensacola, Florida, where Saratoga arrived on January 6, 1848, disembarked all of her seriously sick patients at the base hospital, and replenished her stores. On January 31, 1848, Farragut took the ship out of Pensacola bound for New York City, arriving there on February 19. Saratoga was decommissioned there on February 26, 1848.

=== Mare Island Navy Yard ===
In 1853, Secretary of the Navy James C. Dobbin selected Commander David G. Farragut to create Mare Island Navy Yard near San Francisco in San Pablo Bay. In August 1854, Farragut was called to Washington from his post as assistant inspector of ordnance at Norfolk, Virginia. President Franklin Pierce congratulated Farragut on his naval career and the task he was to undertake. On September 16, 1854, Commander Farragut arrived to oversee the building of the Mare Island Navy Yard at Vallejo, California, which became the port for ship repairs on the West Coast. Captain Farragut commissioned Mare Island on July 16, 1858. Farragut returned to a hero's welcome at Mare Island on August 11, 1859.

=== Civil War service ===
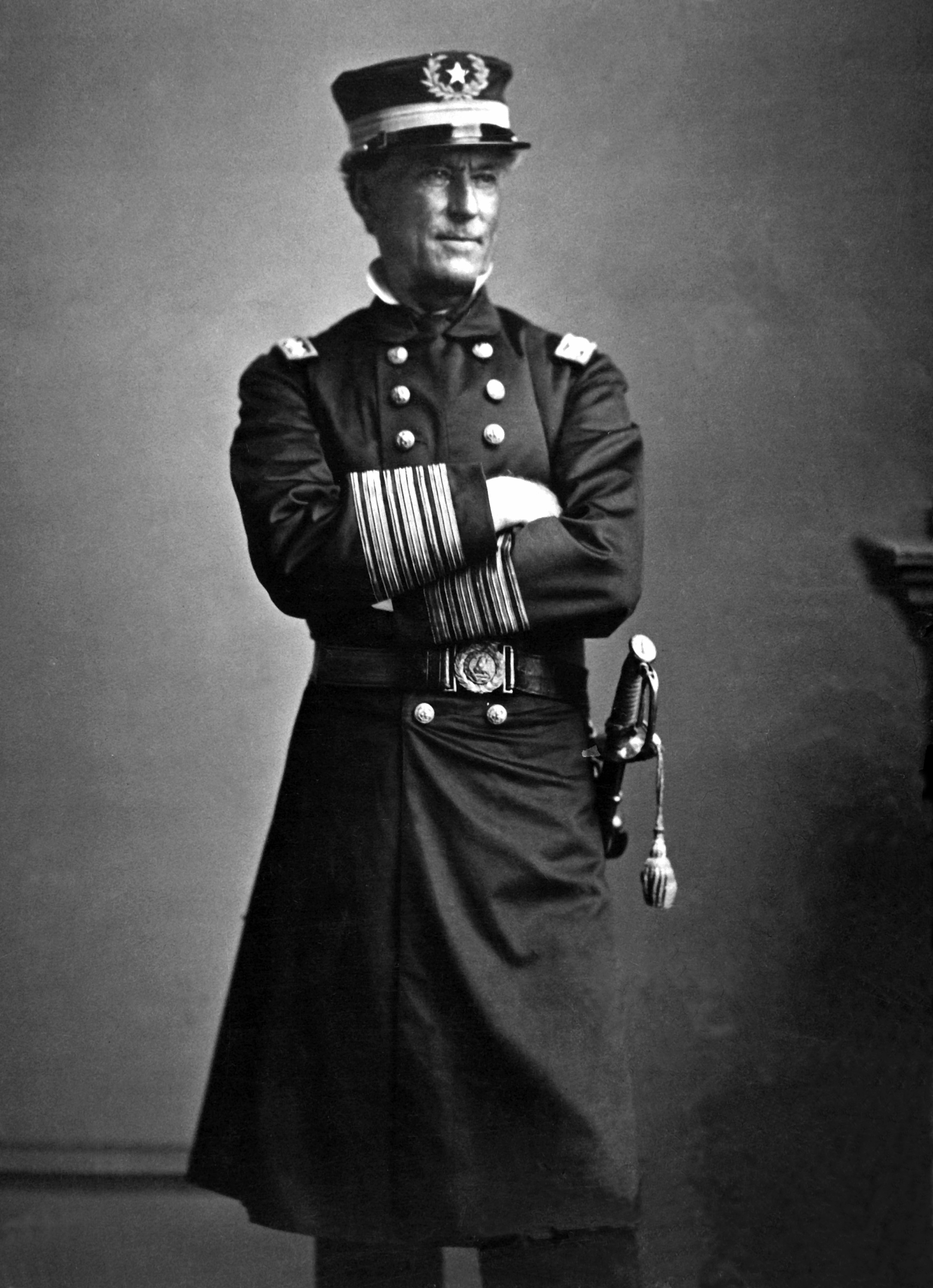
Rear Admiral David G. Farragut, c. 1863

Although he was a Southerner by birth and lived in the South prior to the American Civil War, Farragut made it clear to all who knew him that he regarded secession as treason. Just before the war's outbreak, Farragut moved with his Virginia-born wife to Hastings-on-Hudson, a small town just outside New York City.

He offered his services to the Union, and was initially given a seat on the Naval Retirement Board. Offered a command by his foster brother, David Dixon Porter, for a special assignment, he hesitated upon learning the target might be Norfolk. As he had friends and relatives living there, he was relieved to learn the target was changed to his former childhood home of New Orleans.

Farragut was appointed under secret instructions on February 3, 1862, to command the Gulf Blockading Squadron, sailing from Hampton Roads on the screw steamer USS Hartford, bearing 25 guns, which he made his flagship, accompanied by a fleet of 17 ships. He reached the mouth of the Mississippi River, near Confederate forts St. Philip and Jackson, situated opposite one another along the banks of the river, with a combined armament of more than 100 heavy guns and a complement of 700 men. Now aware of Farragut's approach, the Confederates had amassed a fleet of 16 gunboats just outside New Orleans.

On April 18, Farragut ordered the mortar boats, under the command of Porter, to commence bombardment on the two forts, inflicting considerable damage, but not enough to compel the Confederates to surrender. After two days of heavy bombardment, Farragut ran past forts Jackson and St. Philip and the Chalmette batteries to take the city and port of New Orleans on April 29, a decisive event in the war.

Congress honored him by creating the rank of rear admiral on July 16, 1862, a rank never before used in the U.S. Navy. Before this time, the American Navy had resisted the rank of admiral, preferring the term "flag officer", to distinguish the rank from the traditions of the European navies. Farragut was promoted to rear admiral along with 13 other officers – three others on the active list and ten on the retired list. Later that year, Farragut passed the batteries defending Vicksburg, Mississippi, but had no success there. A makeshift Confederate ironclad forced his flotilla of 38 ships to withdraw in July 1862.

While an aggressive commander, Farragut was not always cooperative. At the siege of Port Hudson, the plan was that Farragut's flotilla would pass by the guns of the Confederate stronghold with the help of a diversionary land attack by the Army of the Gulf, commanded by General Nathaniel Banks, to commence at 8:00 a.m. on March 15, 1863. Farragut unilaterally decided to move the timetable up to 9:00 p.m. on March 14, and initiated his run past the guns before Union ground forces were in position. The consequently uncoordinated attack allowed the Confederates to concentrate on Farragut's flotilla and inflict heavy damage to his warships.

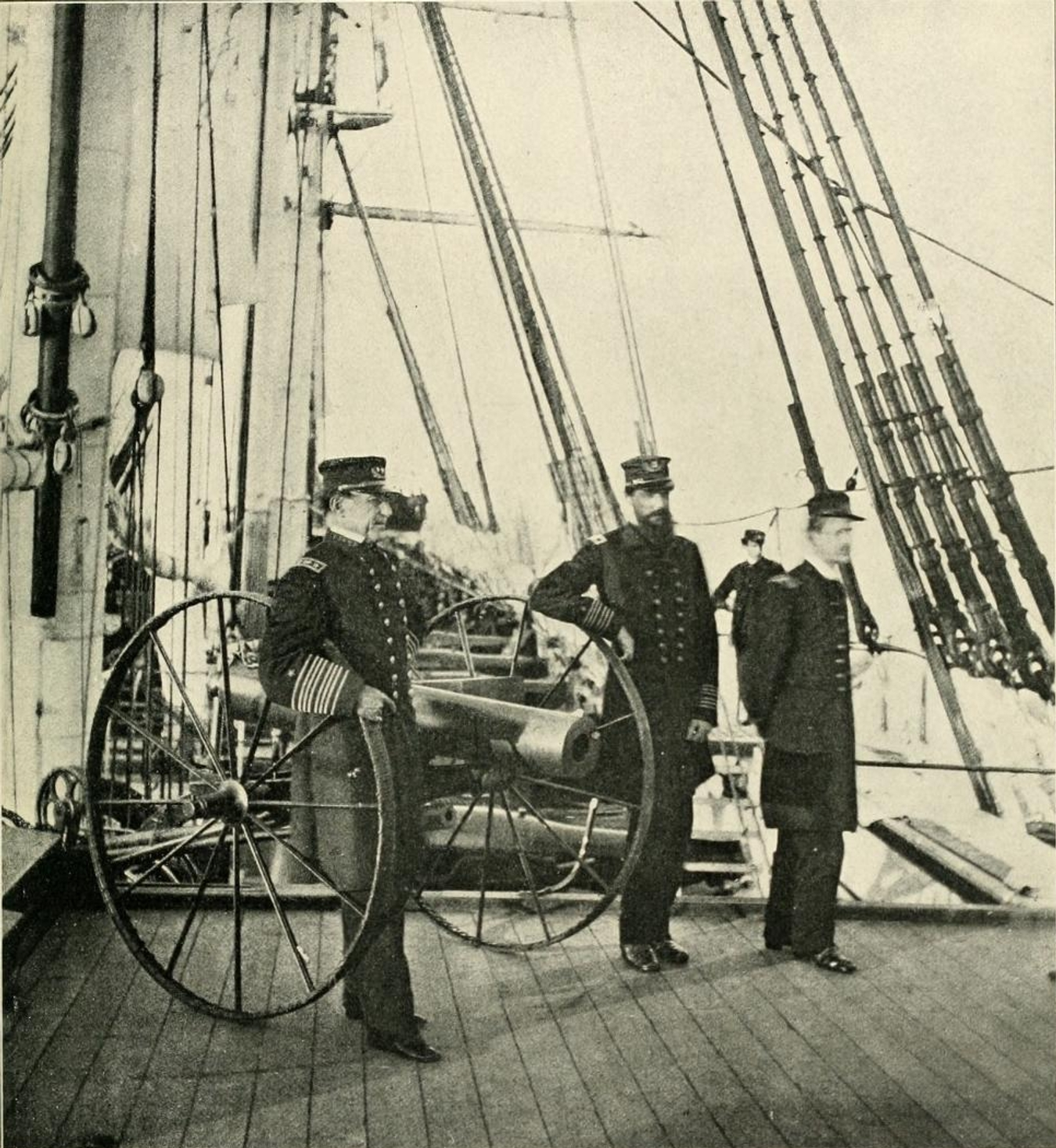
Farragut on board Hartford

Farragut's flotilla was forced to retreat with only two ships able to pass the heavy cannon of the Confederate bastion. After surviving the gauntlet, Farragut played no further part in the battle for Port Hudson, and General Banks was left to continue the siege without the advantage of naval support. The Union Army made two major attacks on the fort; both were repulsed with heavy losses. Farragut's flotilla was splintered, yet was able to blockade the mouth of the Red River with the two remaining warships; he could not efficiently patrol the section of the Mississippi between Port Hudson and Vicksburg. Farragut's decision proved costly to the Union Navy and the Union Army, which suffered its highest casualty rate of the war at Port Hudson.

Vicksburg surrendered on July 4, 1863, leaving Port Hudson as the last remaining Confederate stronghold on the Mississippi River. General Banks accepted the surrender of the Confederate garrison at Port Hudson on July 9, ending the longest siege in U.S. military history. Control of the Mississippi River was the centerpiece of the Union strategy to win the war, and, with the surrender of Port Hudson, the Confederacy was now cut in two.

On August 5, 1864, Farragut won a great victory in the Battle of Mobile Bay. Mobile, Alabama was then the Confederacy's last major open port on the Gulf of Mexico. The bay was heavily mined (tethered naval mines were then known as "torpedoes"). Farragut ordered his fleet to charge the bay. As the battle progressed, smoke blocked Farragut's view from his position on the USS Hartford. In a detailed account of the episode, Robert M. Browning reveals that, in order to see better, Farragut climbed the ship's rigging until he reached the futtock shrouds under the main top. Fearing for his safety, the crew lashed him to the mast and rigging.

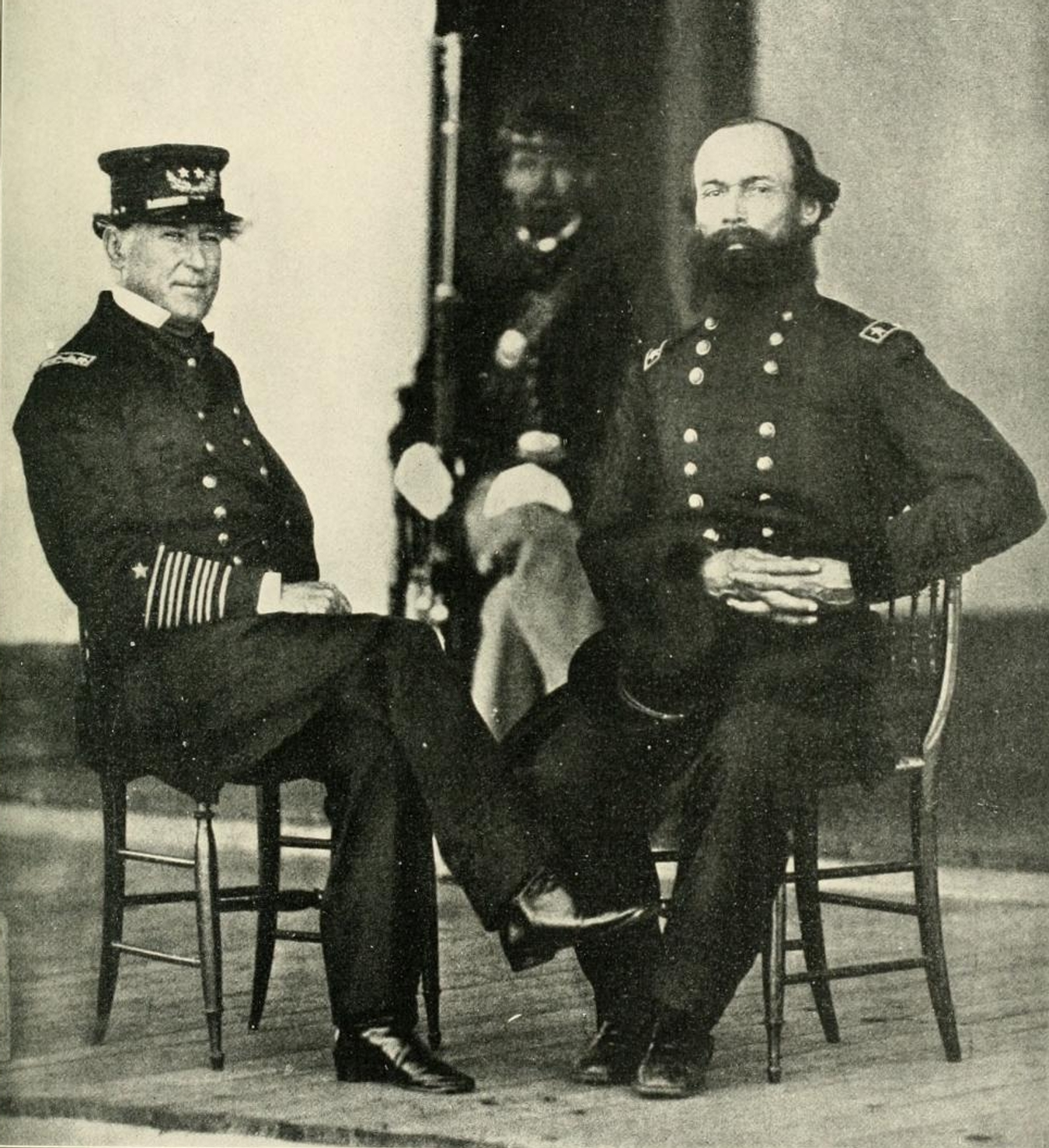
Rear admiral David Farragut and General Gordon Granger

When the monitor USS Tecumseh struck a mine and sank, the others began to pull back. "What's the trouble?" he shouted through a trumpet to USS Brooklyn. "Torpedoes", was the shouted reply. "Damn the torpedoes.", said Farragut, "Four bells, Captain Drayton, go ahead. Jouett, full speed." The bulk of the fleet succeeded in entering the bay. Farragut triumphed over the opposition of heavy batteries in Fort Morgan and Fort Gaines to defeat the squadron of Admiral Franklin Buchanan. On December 21, 1864, Lincoln promoted Farragut to vice admiral, which made him the senior ranking officer in the United States Navy.

=== Post-Civil War service ===
After the Civil War, Farragut was elected a companion of the first class of the New York Commandery of the Military Order of the Loyal Legion of the United States on March 18, 1866, and assigned insignia number 231. He served as the commander of the Commandery of New York from May 1866 until his death. Farragut was promoted to full admiral on July 25, 1866, becoming the first U.S. Navy officer to hold that rank. His last active service was in command of the European Squadron, from 1867 to 1868, with the screw frigate USS Franklin as his flagship. Farragut remained on active duty for life, an honor accorded to only seven other U.S. Navy officers after the Civil War.

== Death ==
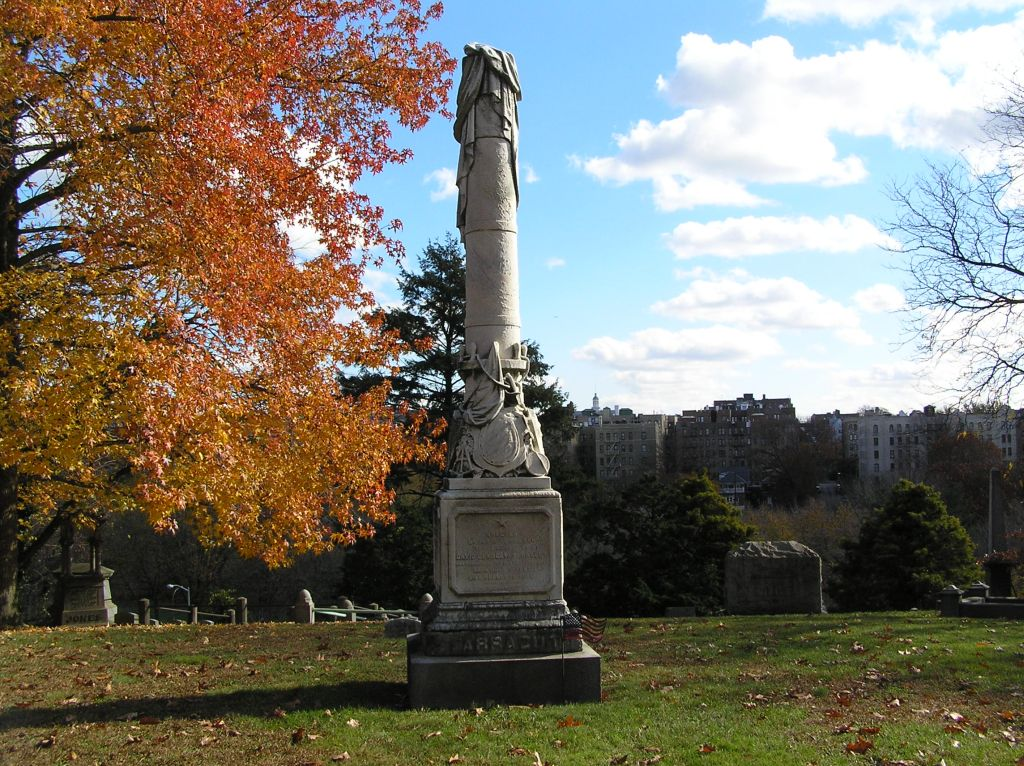
The monument of Admiral David Farragut in Woodlawn Cemetery in The Bronx, New York City

Farragut died from a heart attack at the age of 69 in Portsmouth, New Hampshire, while on vacation in the late summer of 1870. He had served almost sixty years in the navy. He is interred at Woodlawn Cemetery, in The Bronx, New York City. His gravesite is listed on the National Register of Historic Places, as is Woodlawn Cemetery itself.

== Personal life ==
Farragut married Susan Caroline Marchant on September 2, 1824, following an initial cruise as acting lieutenant commanding USS Ferret. She died on December 27, 1840, after 11 years of ill health. Farragut was noted for his kindly treatment of his wife during her illness. He married Virginia Dorcas Loyall on December 26, 1843, with whom he had one surviving son named Loyall Farragut, born October 12, 1844.

Farragut was a Freemason and a Scottish Rite freemason.

== Timeline of service ==
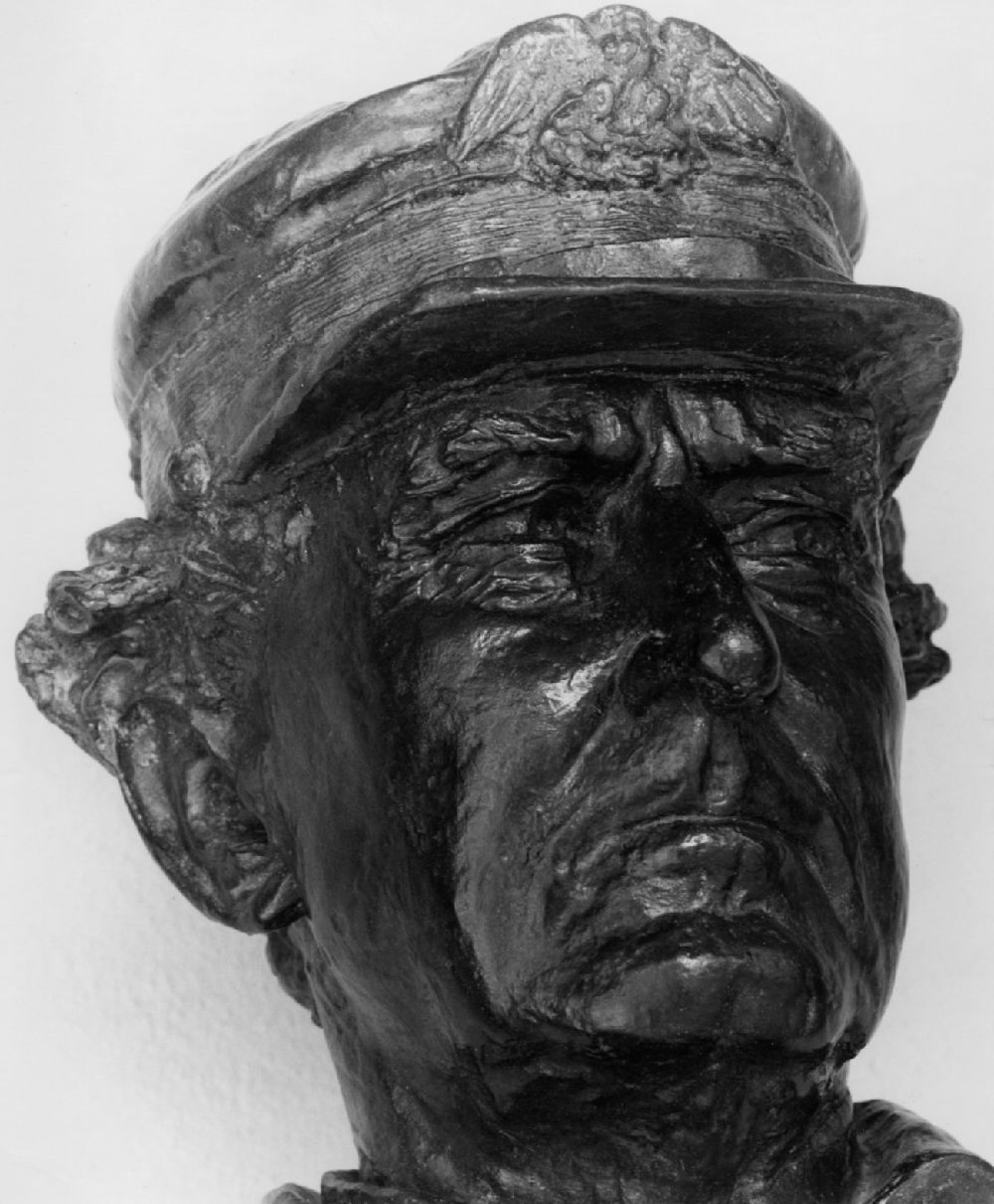
A bronze bust sculpture of David Glasgow Farragut by Augustus Saint-Gaudens

- Spring 1810, added to U.S. Navy rolls as boy seaman
- December 17, 1810, appointed midshipman at age nine.
- 1812, assigned to the frigate USS Essex.
- 1815–1817, served in the Mediterranean Sea aboard the ship of the line USS Independence and the frigate USS Macedonian.
- 1818, studied ashore for nine months at Tunis.
- 1819, served as a lieutenant on the schooner USS Shark.
- 1823, placed in command of the schooner USS Ferret.
- January 10, 1825, promoted to lieutenant on the frigate USS Brandywine.
- 1826–1838, served in subordinate capacities on various vessels.
- 1838, placed in command of the sloop-of-war USS Erie.
- September 8, 1841, promoted to the rank of commander.
- Mexican–American War, commanded the sloop-of-war USS Saratoga.
- 1848–1853, duty at Norfolk Navy Yard in Portsmouth, Virginia, as Assistant Inspector of Ordinance.
- September 1852 – August 1853, assigned to superintend the testing of the endurance of naval gun batteries at Old Point Comfort at Fort Monroe in Virginia.
- 1853–1854, duty at Washington, D.C.
- September 14, 1855, promoted to the rank of captain.
- 1854–1858, duty establishing Mare Island Navy Yard at San Francisco Bay in California.
- 1858–1859, commander of the screw sloop-of-war USS Brooklyn.
- 1860–1861, stationed at Norfolk Navy Yard.
- January 13, 1862, promoted to the rank of flag officer (equivalent to commodore).
- January 1862, commanded the screw sloop-of-war USS Hartford and the West Gulf Blockading Squadron of 17 vessels.
- April 1862, took command of occupied New Orleans, Louisiana.
- June 23, 1862, wounded near Vicksburg, Mississippi.
- July 16, 1862, promoted to rear admiral.
- March 15, 1863, commanded naval forces at the Battle of Port Hudson.
- May 1863, commanded the screw sloop-of-war USS Monongahela.
- May 1863, commanded the screw steamer USS Pensacola.
- July 1863, commanded the sidewheel paddle steamer USS Tennessee.
- August 5, 1864, Battle of Mobile Bay.
- September 5, 1864, offered command of the North Atlantic Blockading Squadron, but he declined because of family issues.
- December 21, 1864, promoted to vice admiral.
- April 1865, pallbearer for the funeral of Abraham Lincoln.
- July 25, 1866, promoted to admiral.
- June 1867 – 1868, commanded the European Squadron with the screw frigate USS Franklin as his flagship.
- August 14, 1870, died at Portsmouth Navy Yard in Kittery, Maine.

== Legacy ==
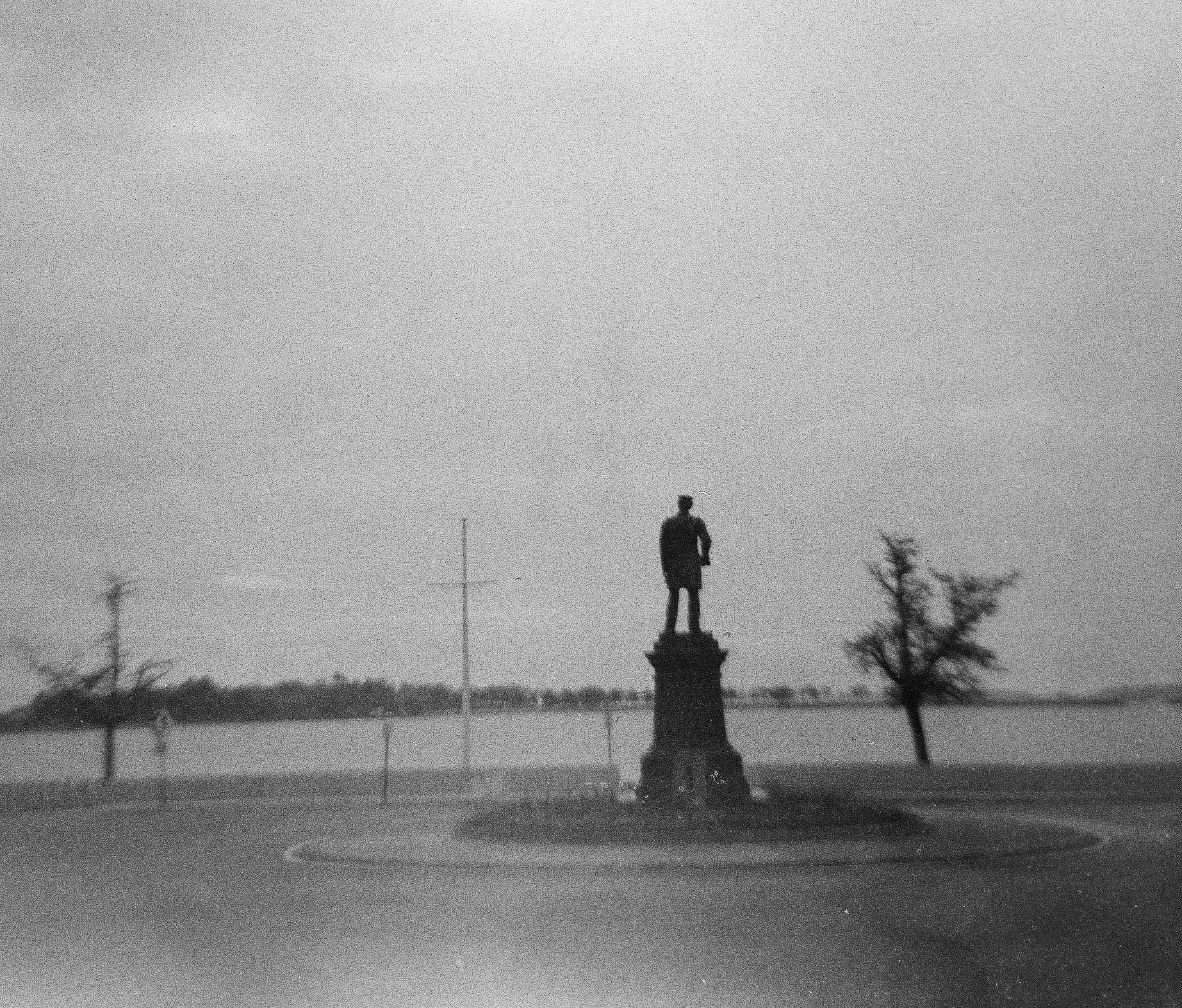
Statue of Admiral David Farragut overlooking Pleasure Bay in South Boston, Massachusetts

Campbell's Station, Tennessee, was only a few miles from Admiral Farragut's birthplace, and it was renamed Farragut, Tennessee, in his honor. Farragut Square in Washington, D.C., is named in his honor. A statue of him named Admiral David G. Farragut is in the center of Farragut Square. Washington Metro stations Farragut West and Farragut North also share his name. There is a statue of Admiral Farragut at the South Boston Marine Park adjacent to Castle Island. There is also an outdoor sculpture of him in Madison Square Park in Manhattan, where the Farragut section of the Borough of Brooklyn is named for him. A street in The Bronx, New York, is also named for him.

The Superintendent's residence at the United States Naval Academy was named Farragut House in May 2023, replacing the former name of Buchanan House which had been in honor of Confederate Admiral Buchanan who was defeated by Farragut at the Battle of Mobile Bay during the Civil War. Farragut Naval Training Station in Northern Idaho on Lake Pend Oreille was a World War II naval training center with over 293,000 sailors receiving basic training there. In 1966, the state of Idaho turned the land into Farragut State Park. Two separate classes of U.S. Navy destroyers have been named for Farragut: the Farragut class of 1934 and the Farragut class of 1958. Other U.S. Navy ships named Farragut include TB-11 of 1898, DD-300 of 1920, and DDG-99 of 2006.

Admiral Farragut Academy was founded in 1933 as an all-boys military boarding high school located in St. Petersburg, Florida. Today, the academy is a college preparatory school which serves students from kindergarten through 12th grade. Farragut Career Academy in Chicago, and Farragut High School in Farragut, Tennessee, are other high schools named in his honor.

Farragut has been honored more than once on US postage stamps. The first postage stamp (at left) was the one-dollar black issue of 1903. The Navy Issue of 1937 includes a three-cent purple stamp which depicts Admirals David Farragut (left) and David Porter, with a warship under sail displayed at center. The most recent postage issue honoring Farragut was released from Gettysburg, Pennsylvania, on June 29, 1995.

The Tennessee State Capitol Commission and Historical Commission voted on July 22, 2021, to move busts of Admiral Farragut, Nathan Bedford Forrest, and Admiral Albert Gleaves from the Tennessee Capitol to the Tennessee State Museum. The process of moving them officially began on July 23, 2021. Farragut's likeness is featured on the southern side of the Soldiers' and Sailors' Monument in Portland, Maine.

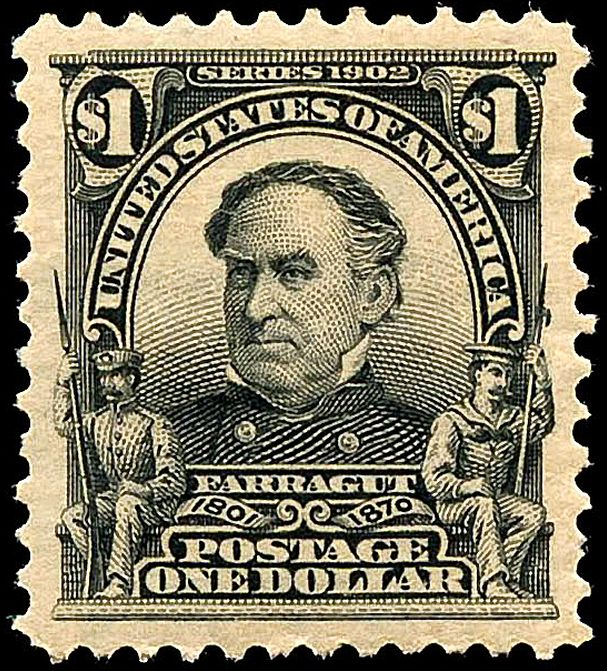
Issue of 1903
First U.S. postage stamp to honor Admiral Farragut

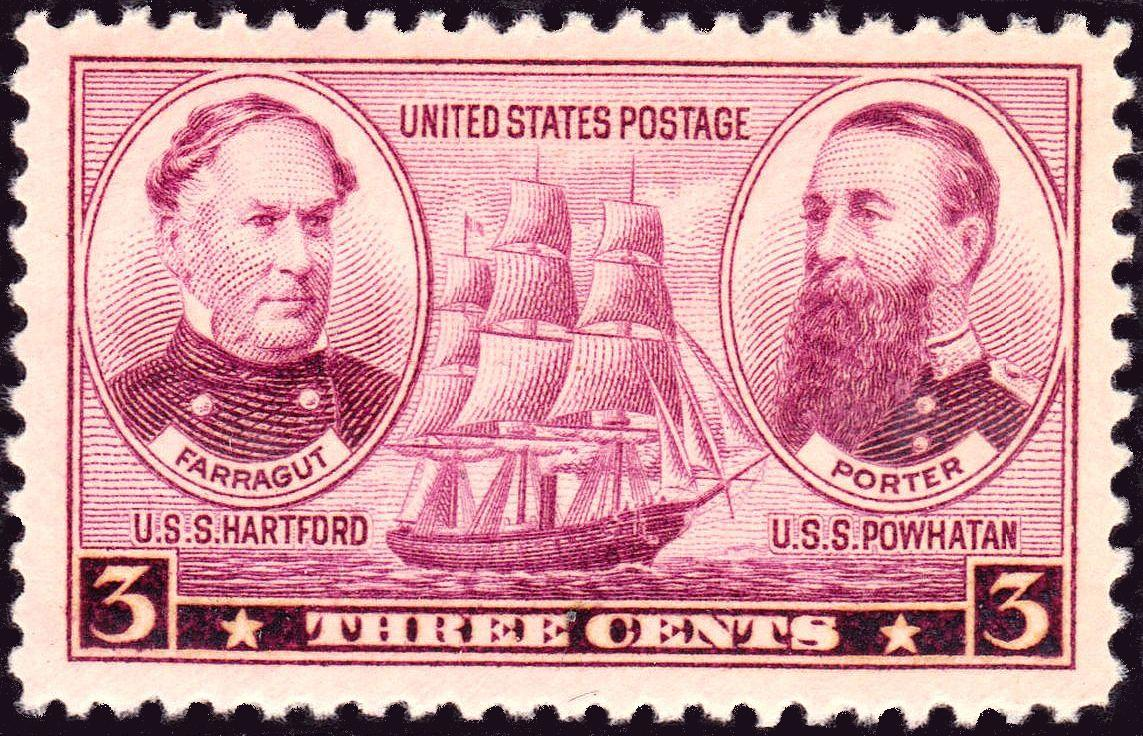
Navy Issue of 1937
Farragut honored along with Porter, his foster brother

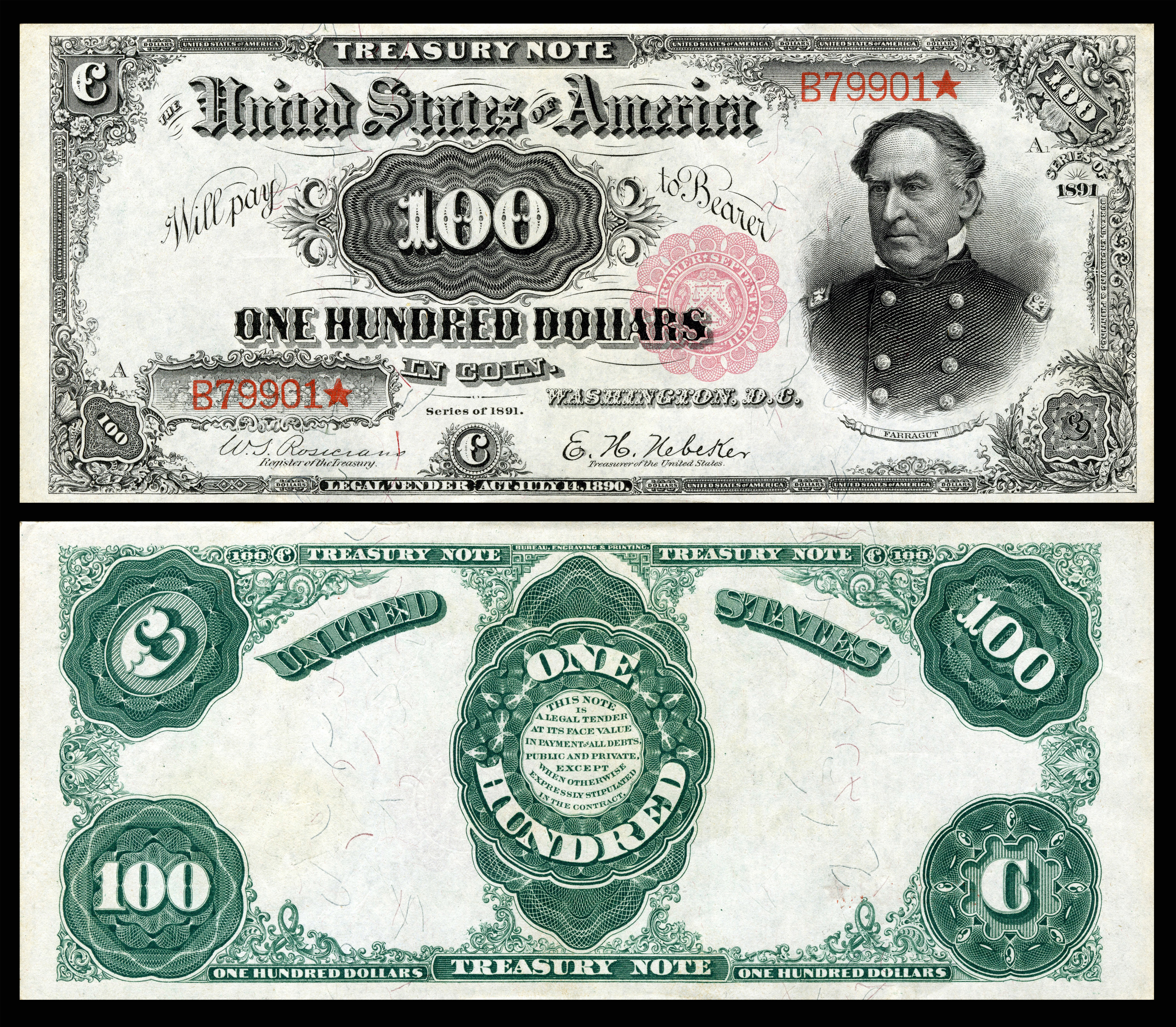
Memorialized on the 1891 $100 Treasury Note, and one of 53 people depicted on United States banknotes

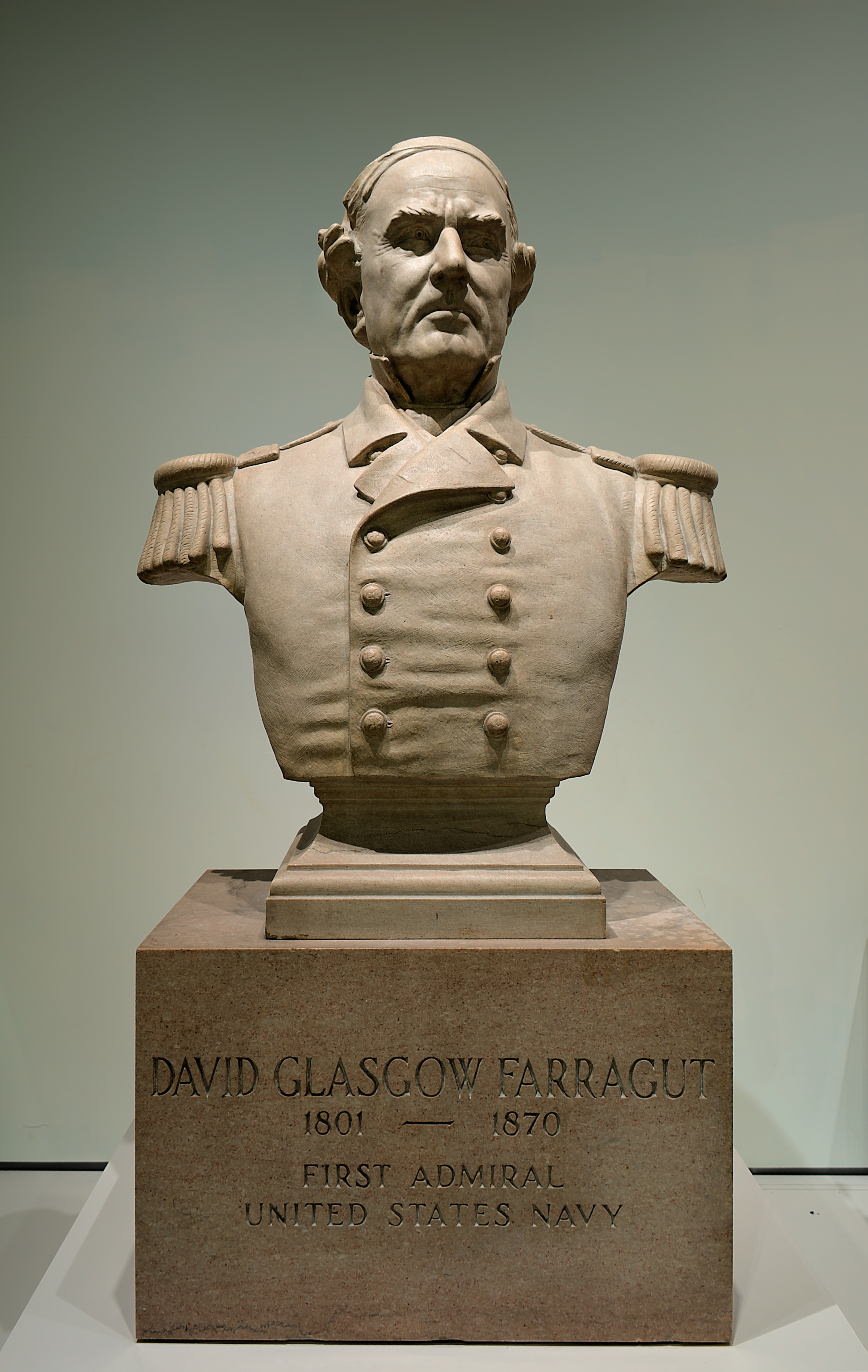
Bust of Farragut at the Tennessee State Museum
In memoriam

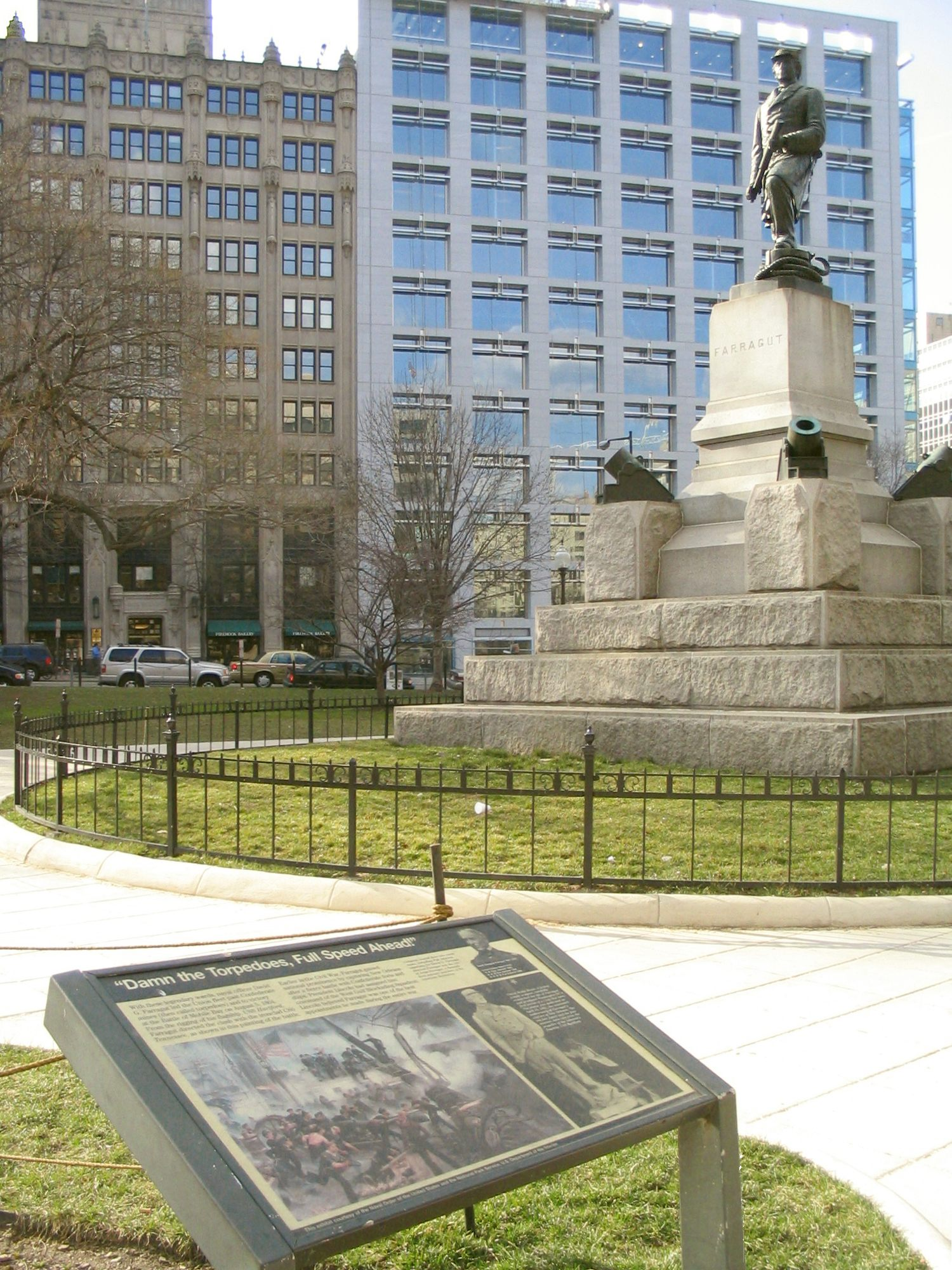
Admiral David G. Farragut (Ream statue), crafted in 1881 from the propeller of his flagship, stands in Farragut Square in downtown Washington, D.C. The National Park Service interpretive plaque in the foreground prominently quotes his famous order.

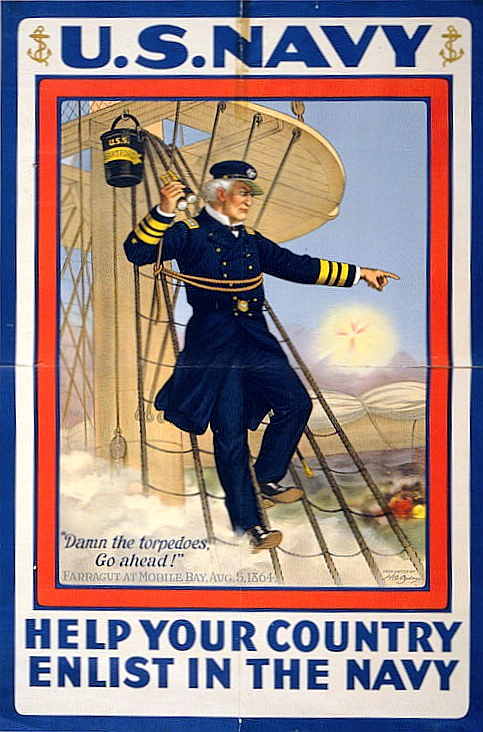
World War I poster with Admiral Farragut at Mobile Bay shouting out: "Damn the torpedoes, go ahead!"

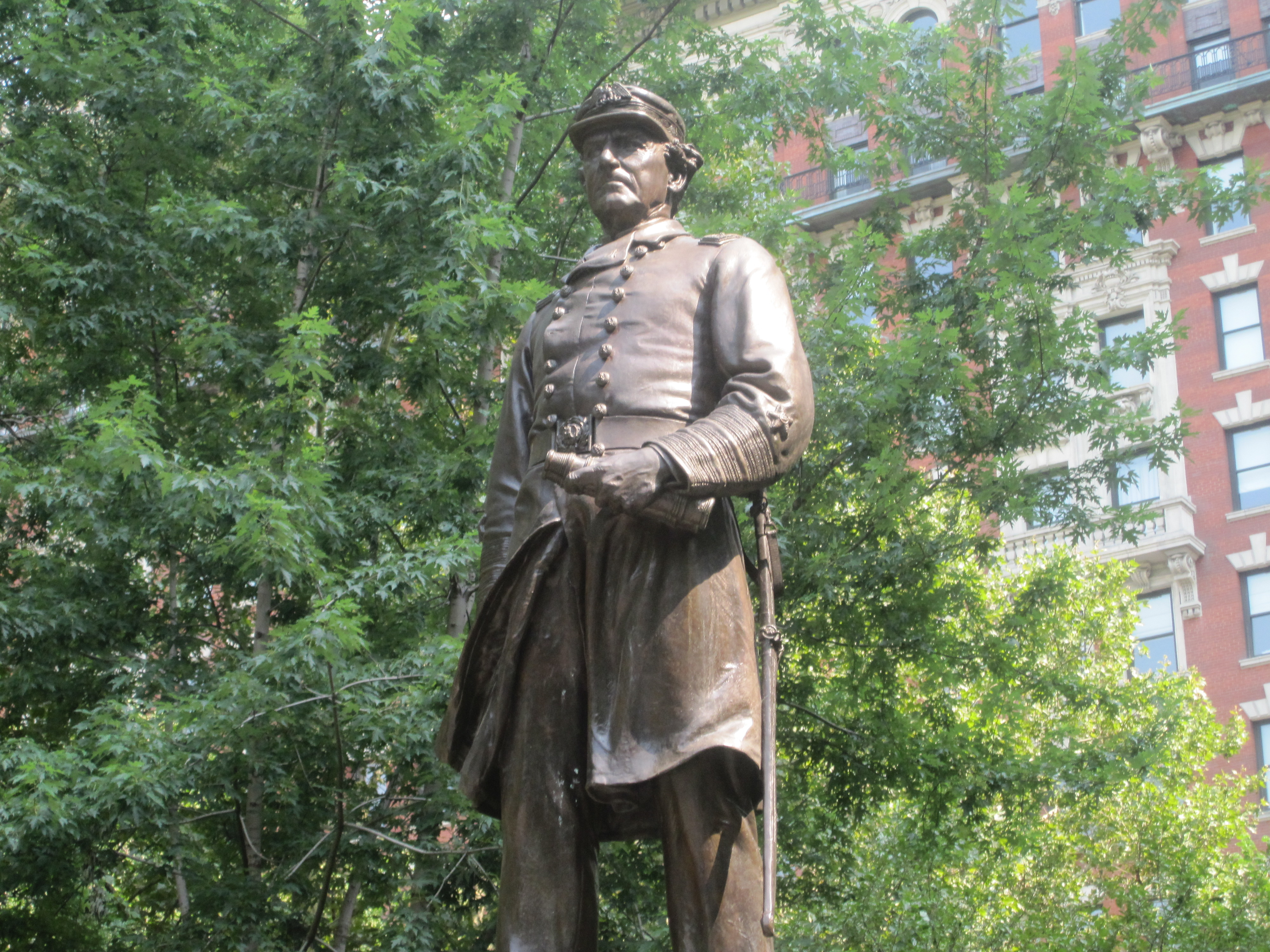
Farragut Monument at Madison Square Park off Fifth Avenue in New York City

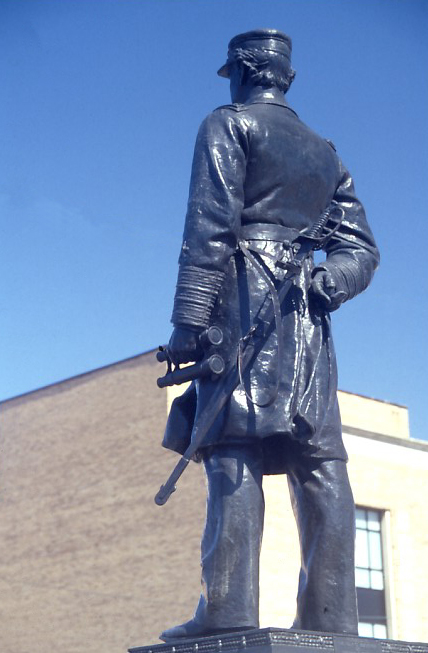
Muskegon, Michigan

Numerous places and things are named in remembrance of Admiral Farragut:

- Admiral Farragut Academy is a college preparatory school with naval training founded in 1933 by navy admirals in Pine Beach, New Jersey. In 1945 the current and now only campus opened in St. Petersburg, Florida. In 1946 it was designated by Congress as a Naval Honor School.
- Farragut, Tennessee, Admiral Farragut's hometown of Campbell's Station (see Battle of Campbell's Station), Tennessee, was renamed Farragut when it became incorporated in 1982. Admiral Farragut was actually born at Lowe's Ferry on the Holston (now Tennessee) River a few miles southeast of the town, but at that time Campbell's Station was the nearest settlement.
- Farragut Square in Washington, D.C. is named in his honor.
- Farragut High School was built at Admiral Farragut's home town of Campbell's Station (now Farragut) in 1904. Today Farragut High School, boasting nearly 2,500 students, is one of the largest schools in Tennessee. The school's colors are blue and white, and its sporting teams are known as "The Admirals".
- Farragut, a neighborhood in Brooklyn
- Farragut Field is a sports field at the United States Naval Academy.
- Farragut Career Academy in Chicago, Illinois is a high school in the Chicago Public Schools system that was founded in 1894; its sporting teams are also known as the Admirals. The school displays an oil painting of the admiral, presented to the school by the Farragut Post of the Grand Army of the Republic in 1896. NBA star Kevin Garnett attended Farragut Career Academy. Wheel of Fortune host Pat Sajak is also a prominent alum.
- Farragut, Iowa is a small farming town in southwestern Iowa. Admiral Farragut's famous slogan greets visitors from a billboard on the edge of town. The local school, Farragut Community High School, fielded varsity "Admiral" and JV "Sailor" teams until its closure in 2016. The school also houses memorabilia from the ships that have borne the Farragut name.
- Five U.S. Navy destroyers have been named USS Farragut, including two class leaders.
- In World War II, the United States Liberty ship SS David G. Farragut was named in his honor.
- Farragut Square, a park in Washington, D.C.; the square lends its name to two nearby Metro stations: Farragut North and Farragut West.
- Three U.S. postage stamps: the $1 stamp of 1903, the $0.03 stamp with Admiral David Porter in 1937 and a $0.32 stamp in 1995.
- 100-dollar Treasury notes, also called coin notes, of the Series 1890 and 1891, feature portraits of Farragut on the obverse. The 1890 Series note is called a $100 Watermelon Note by collectors, because the large zeroes on the reverse resemble the pattern on a watermelon.
- A stained glass window in the United States Naval Academy Chapel depicts Farragut in the rigging of USS Hartford at Mobile Bay.
- David Glasgow Farragut High School is the U.S. Department of Defense High School located on the Naval Station in Rota, Spain. Their sporting teams are also known as "The Admirals".
- Farragut Parkway in Hastings-on-Hudson, New York.
- Farragut Middle School in Hastings-on-Hudson, New York.
- David Farragut School in Philadelphia
- A grade school in Mayagüez, Puerto Rico.
- A grade school (PS 44) in the Bronx.
- Farragut State Park in Idaho, which was used as a naval base for basic training during World War II.
- A hotel in Menorca at Cala'n Forcat.
- A bust in full naval regalia on the top floor of the Tennessee State Capitol.
- Admiral Farragut condominium on waterway in Coral Gables, Florida.
- Farragut elementary school in Vallejo Ca. Located just outside the Mare Island Gate.
- A monument is located off Northshore Drive in Concord, Tennessee. The monument reads "BIRTHPLACE OF ADMIRAL FARRAGUT/BORN JULY 5, 1801... DEDICATED BY ADMIRAL DEWEY, MAY 15, 1900".
- The David Farragut School is an elementary school in Boston, Massachusetts
- The Farragut House bar–restaurant located in South Boston, Massachusetts.
- A larger than life statue near the beach in South Boston.
- Farragut Bay, Alaska, by Thomas, 1887 [Latitude: 57.11889 : Longitude: -133.23056]
- Farragut Inn at Touro University California located on the Mare Island Naval Shipyard.

Monuments

- Madison Square Park, New York City, by Augustus Saint Gaudens, 1881, replica in Cornish, New Hampshire, 1994
- Farragut Square, Washington, D.C., by Vinnie Ream, 1881
- Marine Park, Boston Massachusetts, by Henry Hudson Kitson, 1881
- Hackley Park, Muskegon, Michigan, by Charles Niehaus, 1900
- Farragut Ave, a street and naval base entrance in Bremerton, Washington
Contemporary uses, art and literature

== In popular culture ==
- A "Commodore Farragut", who is clearly based on David Farragut, appears in Jules Verne's 1870 novel Twenty Thousand Leagues Under the Seas.
- In the 1943 film The More the Merrier, Charles Coburn views the famous quote on a statue, and uses the phrase as a motto; it drives the plot forward.
- Farragut is played by actor Scott Brady in the feature film Yankee Buccaneer (1952)
- Among his last acting roles, Ronald Reagan played Farragut in the 1965 episode "The Battle of San Francisco Bay" of the syndicated western television series, Death Valley Days. The episode focuses on the 1856 San Francisco Vigilance Committee. June Dayton was cast in the episode as Farragut's second wife, Virginia.
- Farragut is mentioned in The Wild Wild West episode "The Night of the Kraken", although he does not appear. At the climax, the story's villains try to destroy Farragut's ship with a naval mine, but are foiled by the series' heroes.
- In her 2010 spoken-word debut, Olivia Hedrick released a track "How I love thee Mister Farragut"
- In the video game The Elder Scrolls 4: Oblivion, there is a Fort Farragut.
- There have been a number of spacecraft in Star Trek bearing the name USS Farragut as background or secondary character vessels. This includes a starship and entire starship class as mentioned in the Star Trek: Strange New Worlds series as one of the earliest assignment postings of James T Kirk. Other starships bearing the name Farragut include the Nebula-class starship that rescued the crew of the USS Enterprise-D at the end of Star Trek Generations. This ship was later mentioned as destroyed in the Star Trek: Deep Space Nine episode "Nor the Battle to the Strong." Another starship named USS Farragut of the Excelsior class was mentioned in the Deep Space Nine episode Chrysalis. A starship named USS Farragut was also mentioned in the 2009 Star Trek film as the initial assignment posting for then cadet Nyota Uhura.
- The science fiction Venturer Twelve series features an Admiral Farragut in command of Earth's Space Navy in the far future.
- In CBS Television Series, NCIS; Special Agent Timothy McGee (portrayed by Sean Murray); middle name is Farragut. McGee's character comes from a naval family and was named in honor of David Farragut.

Damn the torpedoes

- In season 4 episode 13 of M*A*S*H entitled "Soldier of the Month", Hawkeye asks the question, "What famous Civil War hero said, 'Damn the torpedoes! Full steam ahead!'?" Klinger replied, "Tugarraf", which is Farragut backwards.
- The album Damn the Torpedoes by Tom Petty and the Heartbreakers is named after David Farragut's famous quote.
- The album MDFMK by MDFMK contains a song entitled "Damn the Torpedoes".
- In the comedy film Galaxy Quest, Tim Allen's character says "Never give up! Never surrender! Damn the resonance cannons! Full speed ahead!"
- In the 1999 arcade racing game Hydro Thunder, there is a novice boat named "Damn the Torpedoes" in reference to the quote. It would later be featured in the game's 2010 sequel, Hydro Thunder Hurricane.

== See also ==
- Bibliography of Naval history of the American Civil War
- Bibliography of early American naval history
- Blockade runners of the American Civil War
- Naval battles of the American Civil War
- Seth Ledyard Phelps (Naval commander who also served in naval operations in the Western Rivers Fleet)
