= Essex station =

Essex station may refer to:

- Essex Station, Connecticut, former name of Centerbrook, Connecticut
- Essex station (MBTA), former name for Chinatown station of the MBTA, Boston, Massachusetts
- Essex station (Montana), an Amtrak station in Essex, Montana
- Essex Freight Station, a disused station in Centerbrook, Connecticut
- Essex railway station (Ontario), a train station in Essex, Ontario, Canada

== See also ==
- Essex (disambiguation)
- Essex Junction station, Vermont
- Essex Road railway station, Greater London
- Essex Street (disambiguation)
