= Essex (ship) =

Essex is the name of several ships:

- For East Indiamen, see Essex (East Indiaman)
- For Royal Navy ships, see HMS Essex
- For US Navy ships, see USS Essex.
  - Essex Junior was the British whaler Atlantic that Captain David Porter, of the American frigate Essex, captured off the Galapagos Islands on 29 April 1813, renamed, and used as a tender. The Royal Navy recaptured Essex Junior, and used her as a cartel. The Americans then seized her when she brought her passengers to New York.

Four American ships that have worked as whalers (whaling ships) have borne the name Essex:

- Essex (1789 whaler), was launched in Hampton, New Hampshire, and made at least two whaling voyages.
- Essex (1799 whaleship), was launched in Amesbury, Massachusetts, and made seven recorded whaling voyages; she is most famous for the last, which ended when a whale rammed and sank her in November 1820.
- Essex (1820 whaler), was launched at Amesbury, Massachusetts, and made some eight recorded whaling voyages before she was condemned at Montevideo in January 1843.
- Essex (1821 whaler), was launched at Saybrook, Connecticut, and made one recorded whaling voyage.

Many merchant vessels have also borne the name:

- Essex (1808 ship), of 30229/94 tons (bm), was built in 1808 in the U.S. She was condemned in the Prize Court on 20 May 1809 for trading with the enemy. Peter Everitt Maestaer then purchased her and retained her name. She was deleted from the register at Cape Town on 12 July 1832 after having been sold for breaking up.
- Essex (1810 ship), of 5542/94 tons (bm) was launched on 13 October 1810 by John Brockbank & Nephew, Lancaster, for J. Wildman & Co. She sailed under two letters of marque. The first was issued on 28 October 1811 to Robert Muirhead, master, for Essex, ship, of 554 tons. It gave her armament as twenty 12-pounder guns. The second was issued on 16 October 1813 to Gabriel Ford, master, for Essex, ship, of 554 tons. This time her armament was described as twelve 9 and 12-pounder guns.
- Essex, a 329-ton sailing ship that the New Zealand Company chartered to bring immigrants to New Plymouth in 1843
- PS Essex, a Great Eastern Railway passenger steamship launched in 1896
