= Essex Farm =

Essex Farm may refer to:

- Essex Farm, previous name of Caldicott, historic house in Somerset County, Maryland, on the National Register of Historic Places
- Essex Farm Cemetery, World War I burial ground near Ypres, Belgium
- Essex County Home and Farm, historic almshouse and infirmary in Essex County, New York, on the National Register of Historic Places

== See also ==
- Essex (disambiguation)
