= John Hare (British Army officer) =

Governor of Cape of Good Hope and British Army Officer

John Hare KH CB KSV
- Born: 1782
- Died: 10 December 1846 (aged 63–64)
- Burial place: St James Church
- Military career
- Allegiance: (Kingdom of Great Britain) 1798–1801 (United Kingdom) 1801–1846
- Service years: 1798–1846
- Rank: Major General
- Unit: 27 Regiment of Foot
- Commands: Gallant Brigade
- Conflicts: Anglo-Russian Invasion of Holland; Battle of Bergen; Battle of Alkmaar; Peninsular War; Battle of Salamanca (1812); Battle of Vitoria (1813); Siege of San Sebastián (1813); Battle of Toulouse (1814); Hundred Days; Battle of Quatre-Bras; Battle of Waterloo; Xhosa Wars
- Awards: Companion of the Order of the Bath (CB); Knight of the Royal Guelphic Order (KH); Order of Saint Vladimir (4th Class)
- Other work: Lieutenant Governor of the Eastern Province, Cape of Good Hope (1839–1846)

Major-General John Hare (1782–1846) was a British Army officer of Irish descent who fought during the Napoleonic Wars and was later made the Lieutenant Governor of Eastern Division of the Cape of Good Hope. He also served in Holland and in the Xhosa Wars.

== Early military career ==
Hare joined the service as an ensign in the Tarbet Fencibles in 1798, he joined the 69th Regiment of Foot when he volunteered to become a regular with more 300 men. In 1799 Hare participated in amphibious landings in the Helder Campaign under the Duke of York, the following year he was commissioned as a Lieutenant in May. In 1800 Hare served under Sir Ralph Abercromby in the expedition to Egypt, aimed at expelling French forces. He was deployed to Naples, Sicily, and Calabria, supporting British interests against Napoleonic forces. Hare was transferred in the 27th Regiment of Foot promoted to a captain on 9 September 1805 and a major on 17 June 1813.

== Battle of Waterloo ==
His regiment had just returned from active service in America. He had participated in the Battle of Quatre Bras, where his regiment's colour was captured and his commanding officer Lieutenant Colonel Charles Morice was killed in a French cavalry charge, after his death Hare assumed the command of the regiment. Out of 698 men, his regiment lost 480 at the Battle of Waterloo, having been almost blown to pieces when standing in square above the sandpit on the Charleroi road, Hare was also slightly Injured in action.

== Later career ==
On 30 July 1818, Hare was bought the promotion of a Lieutenant-Colonel, he was appointed Lieutenant Governor of the Eastern Division of the Cape of Good Hope on 1 December 1839. The 27th served under him against the action of Boers. He died at sea while returning to England, on board the Essex East Indiaman, on 10 December 1846, aged 64 years.
