= USS Farragut =

USS Farragut may refer to the following ships of the United States Navy:

- USS Farragut (TB-11), a torpedo boat, commissioned on 5 June 1899
- USS Farragut (DD-300) was a Clemson-class destroyer commissioned on 4 June 1920
- USS Farragut (DD-348), the lead ship of her class of destroyers, was commissioned on 18 June 1934
- USS Farragut (DDG-37), again the lead ship of her class of destroyers, was commissioned on 10 December 1960
- USS Farragut (DDG-99) is a Flight IIa Arleigh Burke-class guided missile destroyer, commissioned on 10 June 2006
