= Essex (surname) =

Essex is an Anglo-Saxon locational surname, for someone from Essex, England. Notable people with the surname include:

- David Essex (born 1947), English actor, singer-songwriter, and musician
- Frankie Essex, TV personality on reality show The Only Way is Essex
- Jimmy Essex, English actor, dancer and singer
- Joey Essex (born 1990), TV personality on reality show The Only Way is Essex
- Karen Essex, American novelist, screenwriter, and journalist
- Mark Essex (1949–1973), American spree killer
- Trai Essex (born 1982), American professional football player
- Mrs Rock (died after 1779), English actor also known as Miss Essex
- Nadia Essex (born 1981), TV personality
- Robyn Essex, member of the Kansas House of Representatives

Fictional characters:

- Nathaniel Essex, the true identity of Mister Sinister, a Marvel comics supervillain
