= Essex (East Indiaman) =

A number of ships with the name Essex served the British East India Company (EIC) as East Indiamen:

- Essex (1716 EIC ship) — of 320 tons (bm), launched on the Thames in 1716; made four voyages for the EIC before she was sold.
- Essex (1744 EIC ship) — of 570 tons (bm), launched by Brondson & Wells, Deptford, on 17 April 1744, in November 1780; she made four voyages for the EIC until 17 September 1755 when she was sold at Lloyd's Coffee House to breakers who promptly stripped her and broke her up.
- Essex (1758 ship) — of 632 tons (bm), launched by Graves, Limehouse, on 3 August 1758; made four voyages for the EIC before she was sold for breaking up in 1770. She participated in the attack in 1762 that resulted in the British occupation of Manila
- Essex (1780 EIC ship) made six voyages for the EIC and was sold in 1798 to be hulked or broken up. She was present at the battle of Porto Praya and participated in the action of 10 September 1782.
- Essex (1803 EIC ship) was launched on 7 February 1803 by Perry, Blackwell as an East Indiaman. She made seven voyages for the British East India Company (EIC) until on 20 August 1821 her register was cancelled as she had been demolished. She was reputed to have had the greatest spread of sail of any East Indiaman.

== See also ==
- Essex (ship)
- HMS Essex
