= USS Essex vs HMS Alert =

- Part of the War of 1812
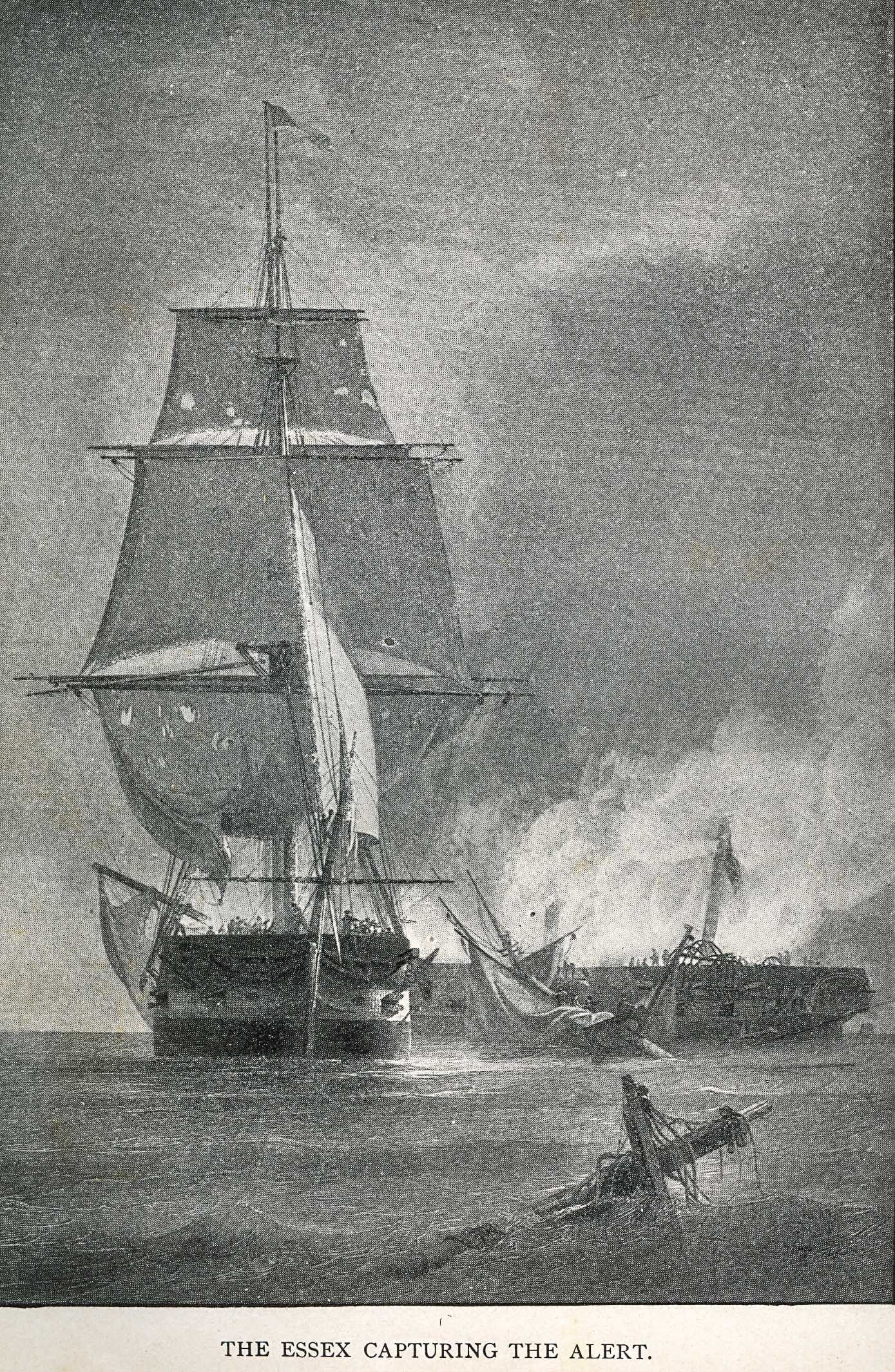
- USS Essex captures the crippled HMS Alert
Date	13 August 1812
Location	Atlantic
Result	American victory

Belligerents
United States	United Kingdom

Commanders and leaders
(United States Navy) David Porter	(United Kingdom of Great Britain and Ireland) T.L.P. Laugharne (surrendered)

Strength
36-gun Frigate Essex	20-gun Sloop Alert

Casualties and losses
None	Alert and cargo captured

A naval engagement between USS Essex and HMS Alert took place on 13 August 1812, in which the light frigate, USS Essex, 32 (commanded by Capt. David Porter, USN) encountered and captured the British sloop Alert, 20 (Captain T.L.P. Laugharne). With "so trifling a skirmish" Porter later said, Alert became the first American capture of the war.

The duel itself lasted a mere eight minutes, during which Essex fired only one broadside. Porter kept his gunports closed making Laugharne believe that Essex was a merchantman. This gave confidence to Laugharne in maneuvering his ship within pistol shot range of Essex, which in turn ran out her carronades and devastated Alert.

In keeping with the chivalrous practice of the times, Porter then allowed Laugharne to sail his ship to Newfoundland so he could disembark his crew, after which he was honor-bound to surrender the Alert to American authorities in New York.

Alert remained in United States service until 1829.

A shipment of 3rd pattern Brown Bess sea service muskets was found aboard Alert, which went towards arming the American Marines at the Washington and Boston Navy Yards. They were preferred for their larger caliber, longer bayonets, and shorter barrels.
