= USS Farragut (DD-300) =

Clemson-class destroyer

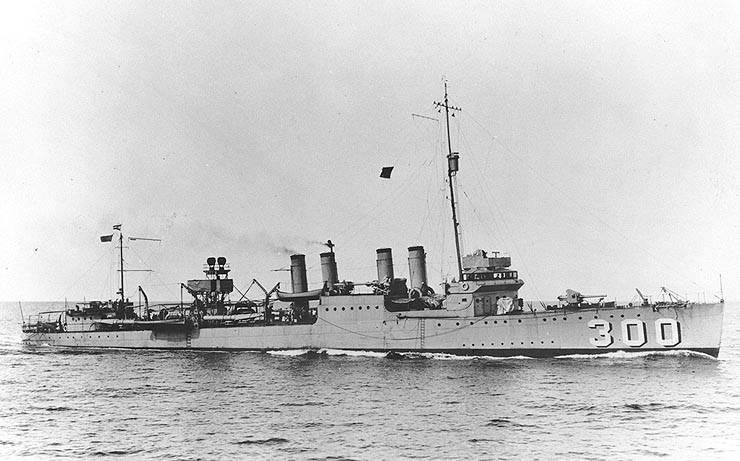
- USS Farragut (DD-300)

History

United States
- Namesake: David Farragut
- Builder: Bethlehem Shipbuilding Corporation, Union Iron Works, San Francisco
- Laid down: 4 July 1918
- Launched: 21 November 1918
- Sponsored by: Marie Charlier Potts
- Commissioned: 4 June 1920
- Decommissioned: 1 April 1930
- Stricken: 22 July 1930
- Fate: Sold for scrap, 31 October 1930

General characteristics
- Class & type: Clemson-class destroyer
- Displacement: 1,290 long tons (1,311 t) (standard); 1,389 long tons (1,411 t) (deep load)
- Length: 314 ft 4 in (95.8 m)
- Beam: 30 ft 11 in (9.42 m)
- Draught: 10 ft 3 in (3.1 m)
- Installed power: 27,000 shp (20,000 kW); 4 water-tube boilers
- Propulsion: 2 shafts, 2 steam turbines
- Speed: 35 knots (65 km/h; 40 mph) (design)
- Range: 2,500 nautical miles (4,600 km; 2,900 mi) at 20 knots (37 km/h; 23 mph) (design)
- Complement: 6 officers, 108 enlisted men
- Armament: 4 × single 4-inch (102 mm) guns; 2 × single 1-pounder AA guns or; 2 × single 3-inch (76 mm) guns; 4 × triple 21 inch (533 mm) torpedo tubes; 2 × depth charge rails

USS Farragut (DD-300) was a Clemson-class destroyer built for the United States Navy during World War I.

== Description ==
The Clemson class was a repeat of the preceding Wickes class although more fuel capacity was added. The ships displaced 1,290 long tons (1,311 t) at standard load and 1,389 long tons (1,411 t) at deep load. They had an overall length of 314 feet 4 inches (95.8 m), a beam of 30 feet 11 inches (9.4 m) and a draught of 10 feet 3 inches (3.1 m). They had a crew of 6 officers and 108 enlisted men.

Performance differed radically between the ships of the class, often due to poor workmanship. The Clemson class was powered by two steam turbines, each driving one propeller shaft, using steam provided by four water-tube boilers. The turbines were designed to produce a total of 27,000 shaft horsepower (20,000 kW) intended to reach a speed of 35 knots (65 km/h; 40 mph). The ships carried a maximum of 371 long tons (377 t) of fuel oil which was intended gave them a range of 2,500 nautical miles (4,600 km; 2,900 mi) at 20 knots (37 km/h; 23 mph).

The ships were armed with four 4-inch (102 mm) guns in single mounts and were fitted with two 1-pounder guns for anti-aircraft defense. In many ships a shortage of 1-pounders caused them to be replaced by 3-inch (76 mm) guns. Their primary weapon, though, was their torpedo battery of a dozen 21 inch (533 mm) torpedo tubes in four triple mounts. They also carried a pair of depth charge rails. A "Y-gun" depth charge thrower was added to many ships.

== Construction and career ==
Farragut, named for Admiral David Farragut, was laid down by the Union Iron Works Plant of the Bethlehem Shipbuilding Corporation in San Francisco, California on 4 July 1918.

It was sponsored by Marie Charlier Potts, wife of Templin Morris Potts, and launched on 21 November 1918. On 4 June 1920, it was commissioned.

Farragut arrived at San Diego, California 3 July 1920, and was at once placed in reserve until 31 March 1922. Then she took up a regular training schedule along the west coast, from the Panama Canal Zone to Oregon. On 27 July 1923, at Seattle, Washington, she took part in a review taken by President Warren G. Harding, on his way home from a visit to Alaska. Returning to San Diego, she, with eight other ships, grounded on a foggy night on Honda Point, 8 September, in the Honda Point Disaster. Farragut and one other ship were able to get clear with only minor damage, while the others remained stranded on the rocky shore.

In both 1924 and 1927, Farragut sailed into the Caribbean for fleet concentrations for maneuvers, in 1927 continuing north to visit New York, Newport, Rhode Island, and Norfolk, Virginia. Her first visit to the Hawaiian Islands was in the summer of 1925, during which she acted as station ship during the flight of seaplanes from the west coast to Hawaii. Again in the spring of 1928 Farragut exercised in the Hawaiians.

USS Farragut was decommissioned at San Diego on 1 April 1930, stricken from the Naval Vessel Register on 22 July 1930 and sold for scrap on 31 October 1930 in accordance with the London Naval Treaty.
