= PS Essex =

Passenger ship built for the Great Eastern Railway

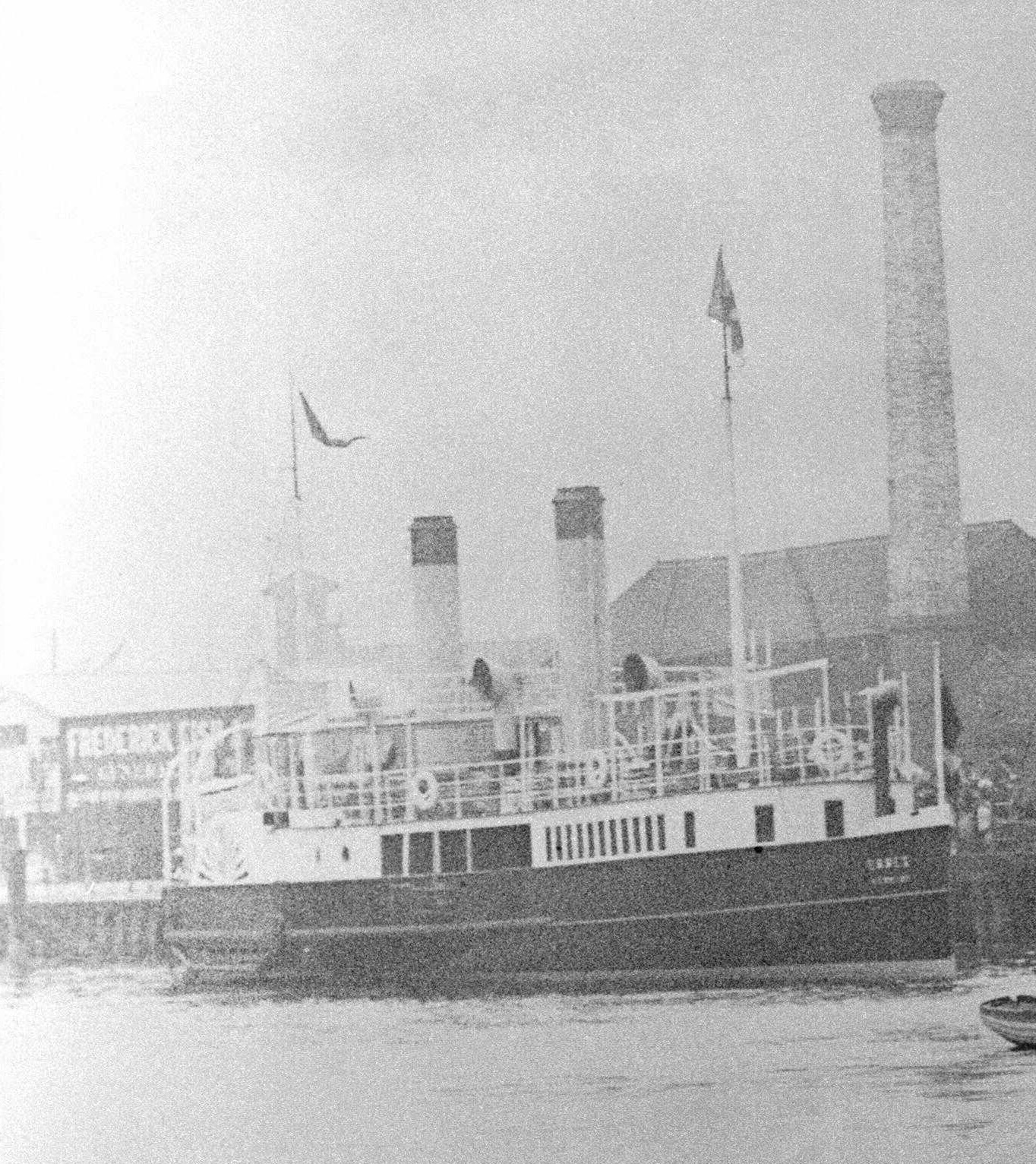
- PS Essex at New Cut, Ipswich, in May 1904

History
- Name: 1896–1918: Essex; 1918–????: Acropolis
- Operator: 1896–1913: Great Eastern Railway; 1913–1914: Joseph Constant; 1914–1916: Henry Cooner, Westcliff; 1916–1918: Goole and Hull Steam Packet Company; 1918–????: Hellenic Mediterranean Black Sea Company, Pireaus
- Port of registry: United Kingdom
- Builder: Earle's Shipbuilding, Hull
- Launched: 8 June 1896

General characteristics
- Tonnage: 297 GRT
- Length: 175.5 ft (53.5 m)
- Beam: 23.1 ft (7.0 m)
- Depth: 7 ft (2.1 m)

PS Essex was a passenger vessel built for the Great Eastern Railway in 1896.

== History ==
The ship was built by Earle's Shipbuilding in Hull for the Great Eastern Railway and launched on 8 June 1896. She was christened by Miss K. Howard, daughter of Captain D. Howard, the Great Eastern Railway Company marine superintendent. She was launched with engines and boilers on board, and steam up.

Essex was used on local services and coastal excursions. In 1913 she was sold to Joseph Constant who sold Essex in 1914 to Henry Cooner, Westcliff. She was acquired by the Goole and Hull Steam Packet Company who held onto the ship until 1918 when she was sold again to the Hellenic Mediterranean Black Sea Company and renamed Acropolis.

Acropolis sailed from Hull on 10 May 1919 for Gibraltar and was reported as foundering on 16 May off Finisterre. However, this report was later contradicted as she only left Corunna on 22 May 1919.
