= Mrs Rock =

British actor

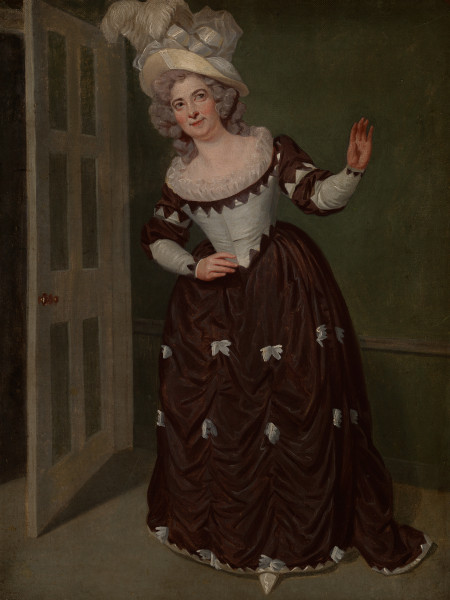
- by Samuel De Wilde
- Born: Miss Essex
- Died: 1779 or after
- Other name: Mrs Edward Anthony Rock
- Occupation: actor
- Known for: playing chambermaids
- Spouse: Edward Anthony Rock

Mrs Rock or Mrs Edward Anthony Rock or Miss Essex (died 1779 or after) was a British actress. She played at the best theatres in London in minor roles. Her reviews record her poor acting, but there is a portrait of her (in a role she is thought never to have played) in the Garrick Club.

== Life ==
Miss Essex first appeared in The Contract at the Haymarket Theatre in 1779.

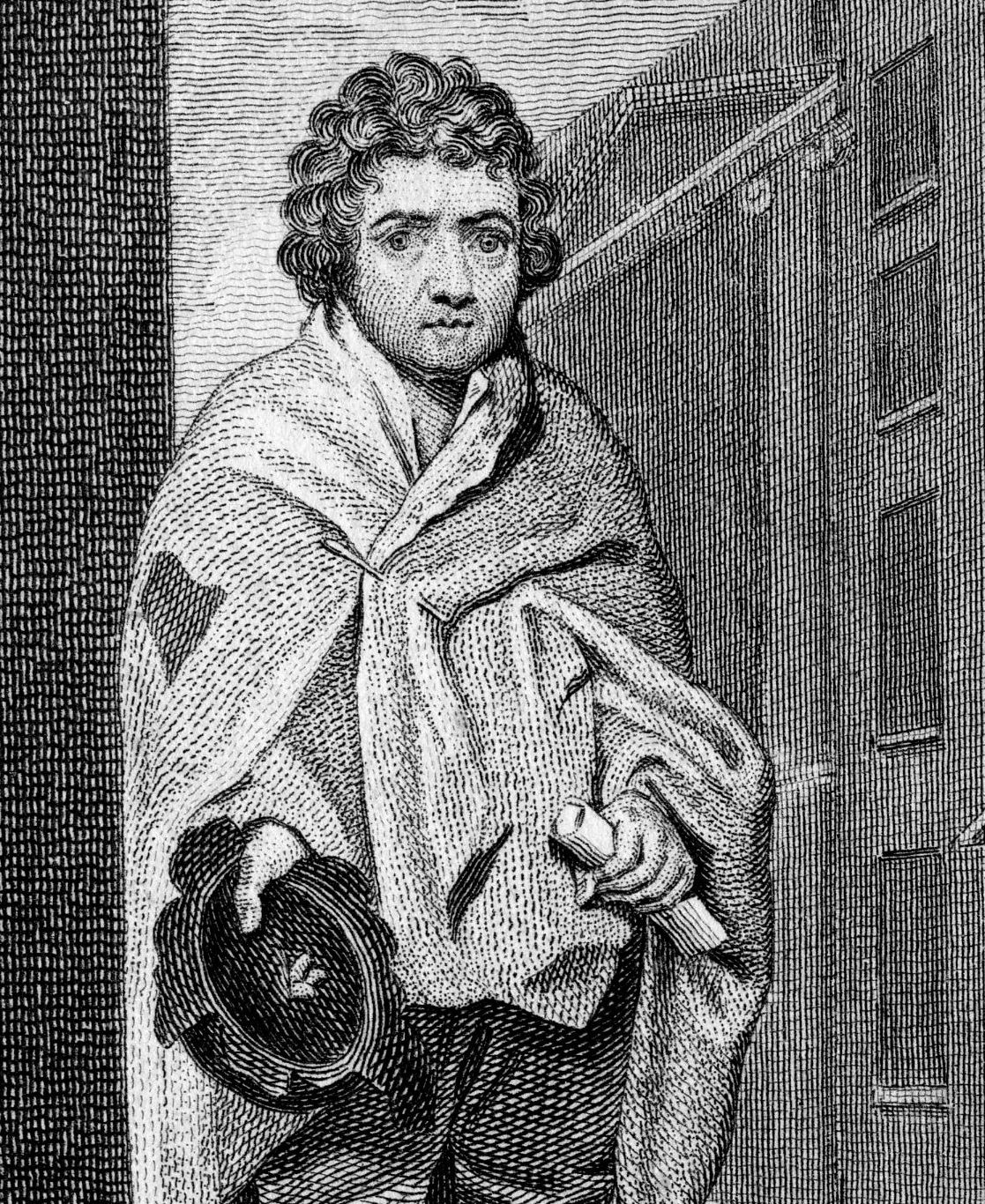
Edward Anthony Rock appearing in 1792

In December 1787 she appeared at the Covent Garden Theatre after a long period playing in the provinces. She was now married to Edward Anthony Fox and using his name. Her salary was 75 shillings a week whilst her husband was earning only 30 shillings a week. She took the role as Columbine in the pantomime on Boxing Day. She was known for getting poor reviews. The following season her salary was reduced to thirty shillings a week.

On 16 July 1790 she appeared in She Would and She Would Not or The Kind Imposter by Colley Cibber at Covent Garden. There is a painting of her playing Viletta in this play by Samuel De Wilde, however the Garrick Club note that she never played the role (in London) although she did appear in the role of Rosa but for one night only. The painting was engraved by J.Thornthwaite and published the following year.

She is presumed to have died in 1793 as she was not mentioned again although her husband went on to appear until 1815.
