= HMS Essex =

HMS Essex may refer to one of these ships of the British Royal Navy named after the county of Essex:

- English ship Essex (1653), a 60-gun ship launched by the Commonwealth of England in 1653 and renamed HMS Essex in 1660; captured by the Dutch in 1666.
- HMS Essex (1679), a 70-gun third-rate ship launched in 1679 and wrecked at the Battle of Quiberon Bay in 1759
- HMS Essex (1760), a 64-gun third-rate ship launched in 1760 and sold in 1799
- HMS Essex (1814), an American sailing frigate originally named USS Essex, captured by the British in 1814, used as a prison ship from 1823, and sold in 1837
- HMS Essex (1901), an armoured cruiser launched in 1901 and sold in 1921

== See also ==
- Essex (ship) for other ships named Essex.
