= Essex station (Ontario) =

Railway station in Ontario, Canada

Essex
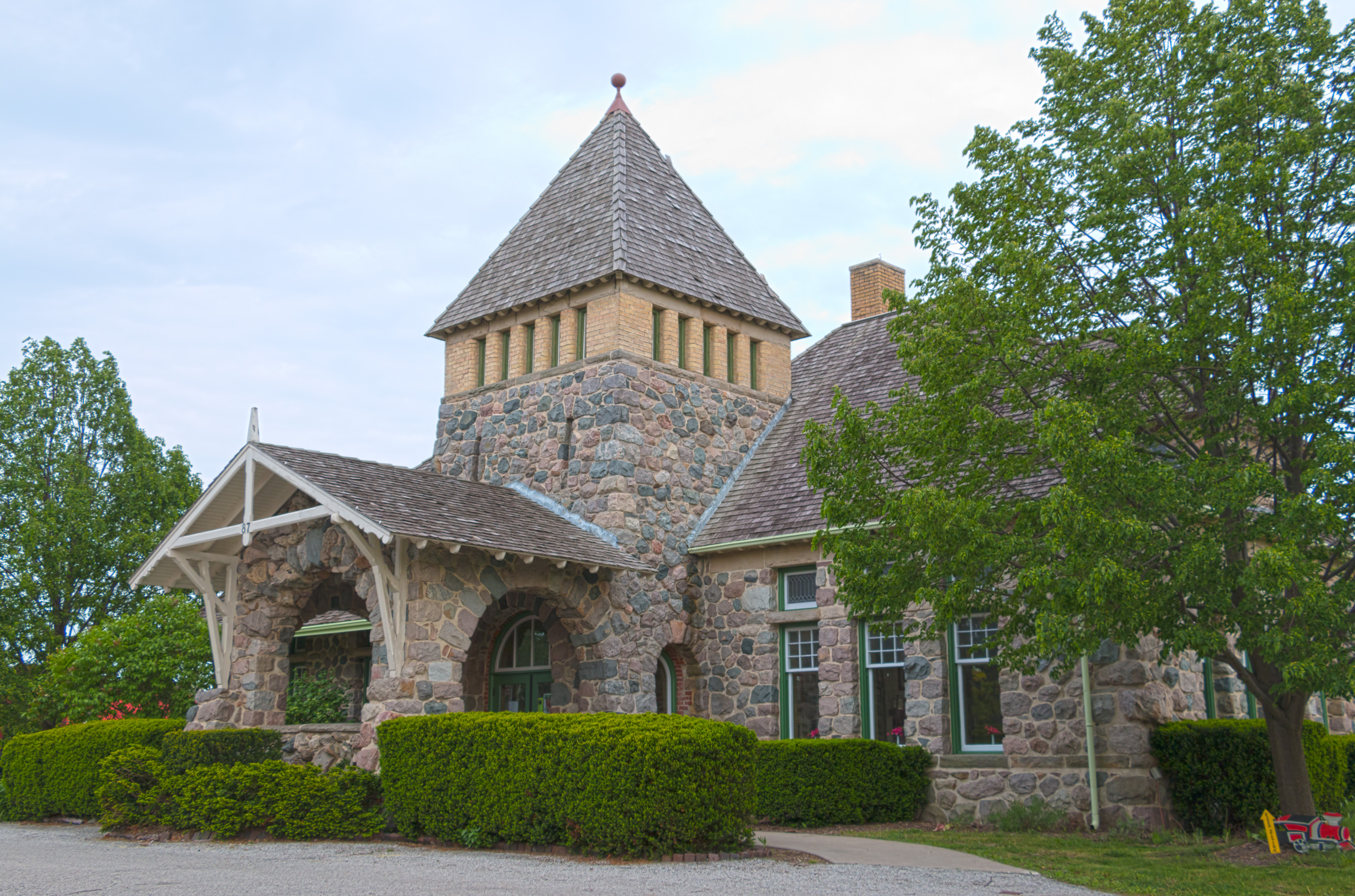
- The restored station in May 2016

General information
- Location: Essex, Ontario; Canada
- Coordinates: 42.17629°N 82.82119°W

History
- Opened: 1887; 139 years ago

Services
Preceding station	New York Central Railroad	Following station
Maidstone toward Chicago	Michigan Central Railroad Main Line	Woodslee toward Buffalo
Location

Essex railway station (a.k.a. Old Michigan Central Station) is a railway station building in Essex, Ontario, Canada, constructed by the Michigan Central Railroad in 1887, and is now operated by a local heritage group, Heritage Essex Inc.
