= HMS Alert (1804) =

UK (1804–1812) and US naval sloop (1812–1829)

History

United Kingdom
- Name: Oxford
- Owner: Champion & Co, London
- Builder: Howdon Pans Newcastle-on-Tyne
- Launched: 1803
- Fate: Sold May 1804

United Kingdom
- Name: HMS Alert
- Acquired: 1804 by purchase
- Captured: 13 August 1812

United States
- Name: USS Alert
- Acquired: 1812 by capture
- Fate: Broken up 1829

General characteristics
- Type: Ship sloop
- Tons burthen: 325, or 390, or 393 (bm)
- Length: Overall:105 ft 0 in (32.0 m); Keel:85 ft 10 1/2 in (26.2 m)
- Beam: 29 ft 4 in (8.9 m)
- Propulsion: Sail
- Complement: Royal Navy:80; US Navy:100
- Armament: Collier:4 × 6-pounder guns; Royal Navy:2 × 9-pounder guns + 16 × 18-pounder carronades; US Navy:2 × 12-pounder guns + 18 × 32-pounder carronades

HMS Alert was the collier Oxford, launched at Howdon in 1803 that the Royal Navy purchased in 1804 and renamed HMS Alert. She had a mundane career in the Royal Navy escorting convoys until in 1812, shortly after the outbreak of the War of 1812, she had the misfortune to encounter the frigate USS Essex, which captured Alert. The US Navy used Alert as a storeship and a receiving ship until it had her broken up in 1829.

== Collier ==
Oxford entered the Register of Shipping (RS) in 1804 with Middleton, master, F.Hurry, owner, and trade Newcastle–London. She was a collier, carrying coal from Newcastle-on-Tyne to various ports in the British Isles.

== Royal Navy ==
The Royal Navy purchased Oxford in May 1804, for £6805, and renamed her Alert. Perry & Co., Blackwall, fitted her between 27 May and 8 June. She then underwent further fitting at Woolwich between 8 June and 9 August. Her refitting for naval service cost a further £3730.

Commander Donald Mackay commissioned Alert in June. The next month Commander James Johnstone replaced Mackay and sailed Alert for the North Seas and the Downs.

Commander Robert Williams assumed command in October 1805, with Commander John Bushby succeeding him in 1807. Commander Williams returned to Alert in 1808.

Commander Alexander Renney assumed command in March 1809. He sailed her to Newfoundland on 3 May 1809 and on 18 March 1810. In November 1811, Commander George Trollope replace Renny.

Commander Thomas Lamb Poldue Laugharne assumed command of Alert in January 1812. On 5 April, he sailed for Newfoundland.

=== Capture ===
Laugharne and Alert were cruising from Newfoundland searching for the American sloop USS Hornet when on 13 August they sighted a vessel at 41°0′N 32°24′W. They sailed towards the vessel and prepared to engage. When they got closer the vessel raised the American flag. Alert opened fire, but realizing that the American vessel was a frigate then sought to disengage. They were unable to escape the frigate, which fired on them. Outgunned and outnumbered, Laugharne was forced to strike; Alert had had three men wounded. Alert was the first British warship to surrender to the United States Navy during the War of 1812.

=== Cartel ===
Essex was already carrying a large number of prisoners, crew from merchantmen she had captured earlier. Furthermore, Porter had depleted his crew to provide prize crews. After Porter disarmed Alert, he and Laugharne agreed that Alert would carry all Porter's prisoners, naval and mercantile, to Canada to be exchanged for American prisoners of the British, and that she would then proceed to an American port with those freed prisoners. At St. John's, Newfoundland, Admiral Sir John Duckworth, then the senior officer of the Royal Navy in those waters, objected that Alert was not a true cartel as she had not departed from an American port. He argued that allowing ships dispatched at sea to be considered cartels would be tantamount to granting all prizes immunity from recapture and would give them ultimate safe conduct to a port friendly to the captor.

However, in this instance, Duckworth felt himself honor-bound to respect Porter's conditions. Captain Laugharne and a small crew embarked some 200 American prisoners of war and sailed for New York where she delivered them safely in the early autumn. Alert was condemned by the New York Admiralty Court and sold to the United States Navy.

=== Courtmartial ===
A court martial was held at Halifax on 8 October to inquire into the circumstances of the loss of Alert. The court martial honourably acquitted Laugharne, the purser, and the master. It found the first lieutenant, Andrew Duncan, guilty of disobedience of orders and of not supporting his captain; it ordered him dismissed the service. The court martial board acquitted the remaining officers and men but expressed its disapprobation because they had all gone aft to plead with Laugharne to strike.

== US Navy ==
The US Navy found Alert unfit for cruising and so instead used her as a storeship at the New York Navy Yard. In 1818 it began to use her as a receiving ship. She remained a receiving ship until 1829 when the Navy had her broken up at the Norfolk Navy Yard.
