= Ford Essex V6 engine =

Ford Motor Company has produced two different V6 piston engines which have been commonly referred to as Essex:

- Ford Essex V6 engine (UK), A 60° V6, 2.5, 3.0, or 3.1 L
- Ford Essex V6 engine (Canadian), A 90° V6, 3.8-4.2 L
