= USS Essex (1799) =

1799 American sailing frigate

Essex
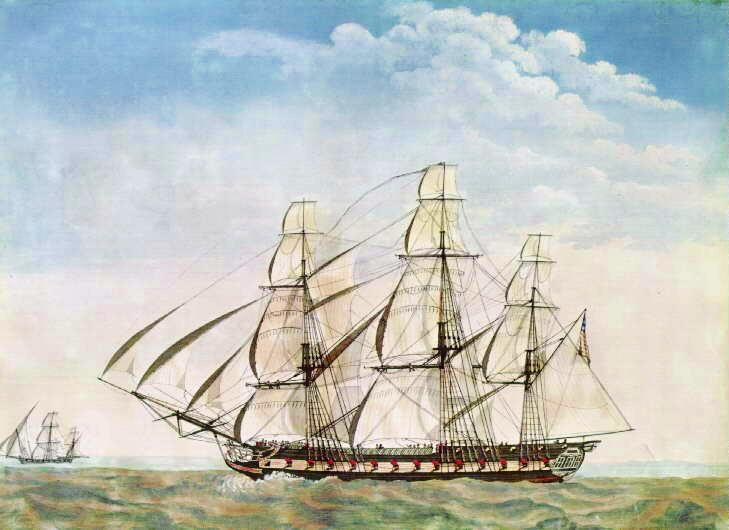
- USS Essex

History

America
- Name: USS Essex
- Namesake: Essex County, Massachusetts
- Builder: Enos Briggs, Salem, Massachusetts
- Cost: $139,362
- Laid down: 1798
- Launched: 30 September 1799
- Commissioned: 17 December 1799
- Captured: 28 March 1814

United Kingdom
- Name: HMS Essex
- Acquired: 28 March 1814
- Fate: Sold at Public Auction, 6 June 1837

General characteristics
- Type: Fifth-rate Frigate
- Displacement: 850 long tons (864 t)
- Tons burthen: 89722/94(bm)
- Length: Overall: 138 ft 7 in (42.2 m); Keel:117 ft 2 7/8 in (35.7 m)
- Beam: 37 ft 3 1/2 in (11.4 m)
- Draft: 12 ft 3 in (3.7 m)
- Depth of hold: 11 ft 9 in (3.6 m)
- Propulsion: Sail
- Sail plan: Full-rigged ship
- Speed: 11.4 knots (21.1 km/h; 13.1 mph)

General characteristics American service
- Complement: 262 1 January, 1802
- Armament: 40 × 32-pounder carronades + 6 × 12-pounder guns

General characteristics British service
- Complement: 315 officers and enlisted
- Armament: Upper deck: 26 × 18-pounder guns; QD: 12 × 32-pounder carronades; Fc: 2 × 9-pounder guns + 2 × 32-pounder carronades

Service record
- Commanders: Edward Preble (1799–1801); William Bainbridge (1801–1802); James Barron (1804); John Smith (1809-1810); David Porter (1812–1814)
- Operations: Quasi-War; First Barbary War; Battle of Derne; War of 1812; USS Essex vs HMS Alert; Action off George Island; Battle of Valaparaiso

The first USS Essex of the United States Navy was a 36-gun or 32-gun sailing frigate that participated in the Quasi-War with France, the First Barbary War, and in the War of 1812. The British captured her in 1814 and she then served as HMS Essex until sold at public auction on 6 June 1837.

== Service history ==
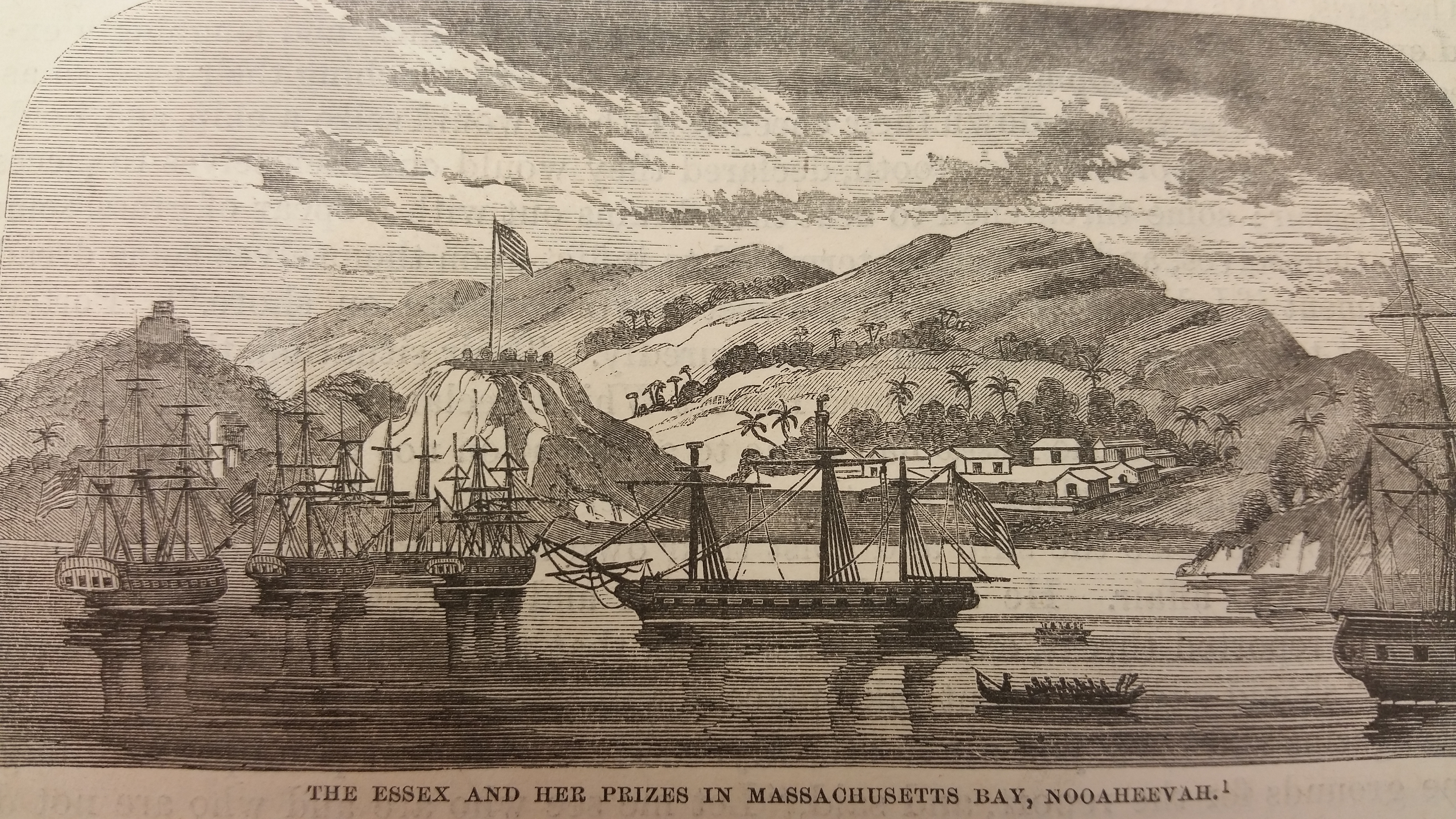
USS Essex with her prizes

The frigate was built by Enos Briggs, Salem, Massachusetts, at a cost of $139,362 subscribed by the people of Salem and Essex County, to a design by James Hackett. Essex was armed with mostly short-range carronades that could not hope to match the range of 18- and 24-pounder naval guns. She was launched on 30 September 1799. On 17 December 1799 she was presented to the United States Navy and accepted by Captain Edward Preble.

Quasi War: On 22 December she departed Salem, Massachusetts for Newport, Rhode Island. On 28 December she joined USS Congress at Newport. On 6 January 1800, Essex, under the command of Captain Preble, departed Newport, Rhode Island, in company with USS Congress to escort a convoy of merchant ships to Batavia, Dutch East Indies.

Congress was dismasted only a few days out, Essex was obliged to continue her voyage alone. Sometime in early-mid February, Essex became the first US Naval ship to cross the Equator, being 16 deg. south of the Equator by the 14th. On 11 March she sighted the Cape of Good Hope and anchored at Cape Town. Due to poor quality of masts and rigging, similar to those problems suffered by USS Congress, she spent a week effecting repairs. On 24 March a heavy gale hit Cape Town capsizing and sinking her launch, the crew was saved with difficulty by HMS Diomede's barge. She departed Cape Town 28 March. She was the first US man-of-war to double the Cape of Good Hope, both in March and in August 1800 prior to successfully completing her convoy mission in November. On 6 May, 1800 she encountered a former American ship that had been captured, condemned for sale in Court and had a French Captain who claimed the ship was now Dutch owned. The next day Essex took control of the ship and entered the Sunda Strait. On 16 May she arrived at Batavia, Dutch East Indies. On 16 June she departed Batavia escorting a convoy back to the U. S. After spending a few days in Mew Bay, Java she departed the Sunda Strait on 1 July. She passed the Cape of Good Hope on 27 August. On 10 September she arrived at Saint Helena Island (15°55′S 06°18′W). St. Helena was the designated rendezvous point for her convoy of returning merchant ships if they got scattered in storms rounding Cape Horn, which they had. All were accounted for by 26 September and they departed. On 11 October they passed St. Paul's Rocks. Returned to New York City 28 November, mooring the next day.

=== First Barbary War ===
She departed New York City for Hampton Roads before 14 May to rendezvous with the squadron. On the same day the Bashaw of Tripoli declared War on the United States. Captain William Bainbridge commanded Essex on her second cruise, receiving command from Capt. Preble on 29 May, 1801, whereon she sailed for the Mediterranean with the squadron of Commodore Richard Dale clearing the Cape on 2 June. Dispatched to protect American trade and seamen against depredations by the Barbary pirates, the squadron arrived at Gibraltar on 1 July 1801. She departed Gibraltar on 4 July escorting merchantmen "Hope" and "Grand Turk", Grand Turk transporting U.S. Government gifts to the Bey of Tunis. She spent the ensuing year convoying American merchantmen and blockading Tripolitan ships in their ports. She departed Gibraltar for the U. S. on 16 June, 1802. Arriving off Sandy Hook on 23 July she received Orders to proceed to Washington, she went on to New York for provisions. While there, on 25 July a near mutiny occurred among the crew who wanted to get off at New York instead of going to Washington, 18 crew were put in irons. Departed New York 29 July. She returned to Washington, D. C. 9 or 10 August, 1802 and was placed "in ordinary". Following repairs at the Washington Navy Yard in 1802 she was placed in ordinary. Recommissioned 2 April, 1804. Captain James Barron was ordered to take command in a letter dated 11 April, 1804 from the Secretary of the Navy. She departed Washington on 27 May. She arrived at Hampton Roads on 14 June. She passed the Capes on % July and arrived at Gibraltar on 13 August. She participated in the Battle of Derne on 27 April 1805, and remained in those waters until the conclusion of peace terms in 1806. On 29 May, 1805 Capt. Barron was Ordered to take command of USS President and was replaced as Captain by Capt. Cox. On 30 July she was with the U.S. fleet at Tunis. On 22 August, 1805 Stewart exchanged commands with Capt. Hugh Campbell of USS Constellation.

Returning to the Washington Navy Yard in July, she was placed in ordinary until February 1809, when she was recommissioned for sporadic use in patrolling American waters and a single cruise to Europe.

=== War of 1812 ===
When war was declared against Britain on 18 June 1812, Essex, commanded by Captain David Porter, made a successful cruise to the southward. On 11 July near Bermuda she fell in with seven British transports (Silverside being one) and by moonlight engaged and took one of them as a prize. On 13 August she encountered and captured the sloop HMS Alert after an engagement. By September, when she returned to New York, Essex had taken ten prizes. The youngest member of the Essex crew was 10-year-old midshipman David Glasgow Farragut, who would become the first admiral of the US Navy. Farragut, who was Captain Porter's foster son, remained with the ship for the next two years.

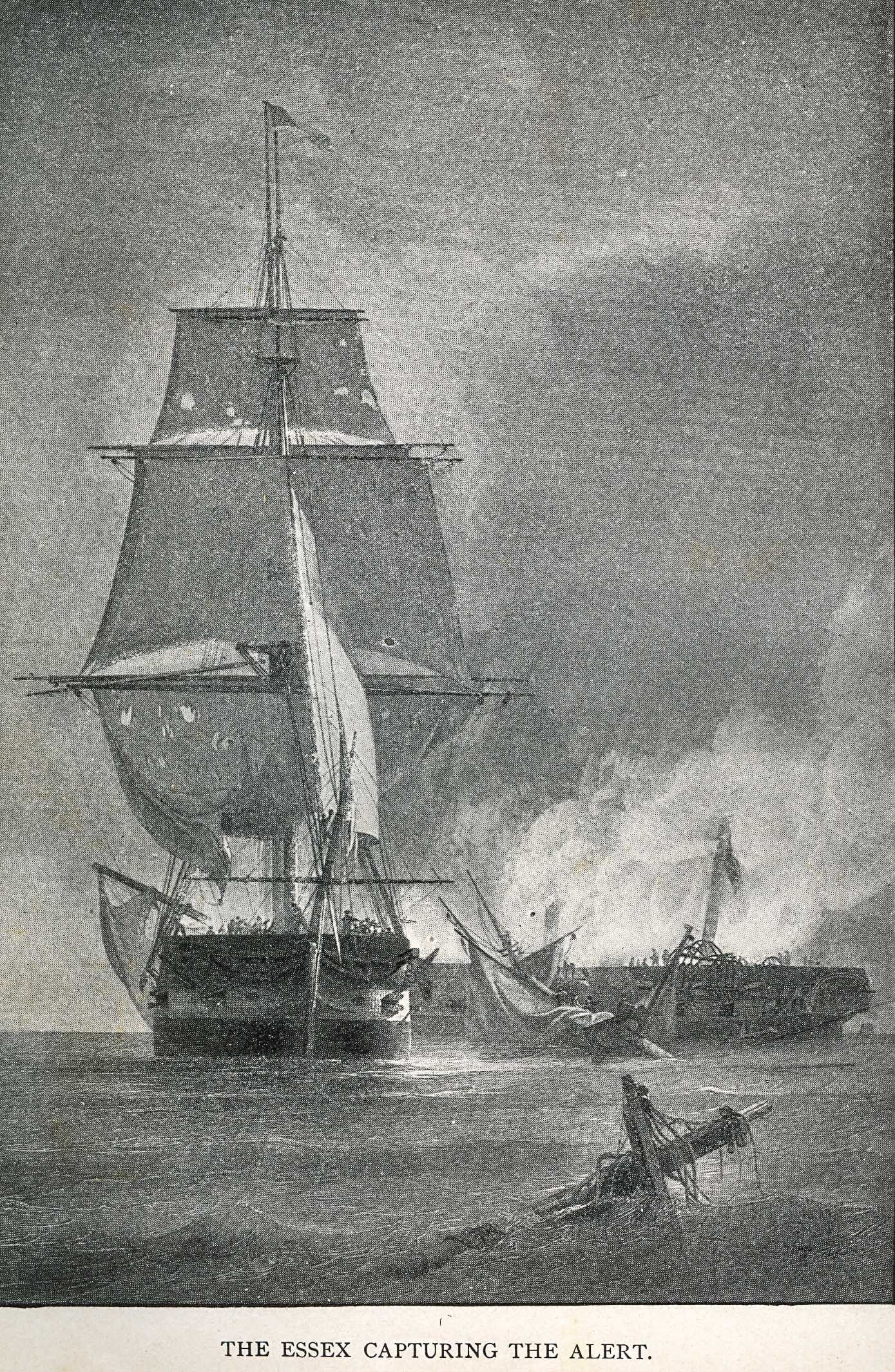
Essex capturing Alert.

Essex sailed in South Atlantic waters and along the coast of Brazil until January 1813. On 11 December 1812 she captured the Post Office Packet Service packet Nocton as Nocton was returning to England from Rio de Janeiro. The Americans removed the specie that she was carrying (about £16,000) and some of her crew. (Note: HMS Belvidera recaptured Nocton on 5 January 1813. Nocton underwent some refitting at Bermuda and returned to Falmouth on 15 March.)

Essex then sailed to the Pacific where she decimated the British whaling fleet there. Although her crew suffered greatly from a shortage of provisions and heavy gales while rounding Cape Horn, she anchored safely at Valparaíso, Chile, on 14 March, having seized the whaling schooner Elizabeth, and the Peruvian man-of-war Nereyda along the way. Nereyda had captured two American whalers, Walker and Barclay, only to have the British whaler and privateer Nimrod take Walker. Nereyda had sent Barclay to Callao, where Porter was able to capture her before she could enter port. He sent a disarmed Nereyda back to the Peruvian authorities as a gesture of good will. He searched for Nimrod and Walker, but was unable to find them. (Note: Barclay, Gideon Randall, master, completed her voyage, returning to New Bedford in March 1814 with 1800 barrels of whale oil. Built in 1793, she continued to hunt whales through 1857, and was finally broken up in 1859.) At Valparaiso Essex landed the crew members that she had taken off Nocton.

In the next five months, Essex captured thirteen British whalers, including Essex Junior, (ex-Atlantic) which cruised in company with her captor; Porter put his executive officer, John Downes, in command of Essex Junior. The two ships and nine of their prizes put in at the island of Nuku Hiva in the Marquesas Islands on 25 October 1813 for repairs. While they were there, their crews became involved in a local dispute that resulted in the Nuku Hiva Campaign, which temporarily established the United States' first colony and naval base in the Pacific Ocean. Essex and Essex Junior departed Nuku Hiva in mid-December 1813.

In January 1814, Essex sailed into neutral waters at Valparaíso, only to be trapped there for six weeks by the British frigate HMS Phoebe (36 guns), under Captain James Hillyar, and the sloop-of-war HMS Cherub (18 guns) commanded by Thomas Tucker. On 28 March 1814, Porter determined to gain the open sea, fearing the arrival of British reinforcements. Upon rounding the point, Essex lost her main top-mast to foul weather and was brought to action just north of Valparaíso.

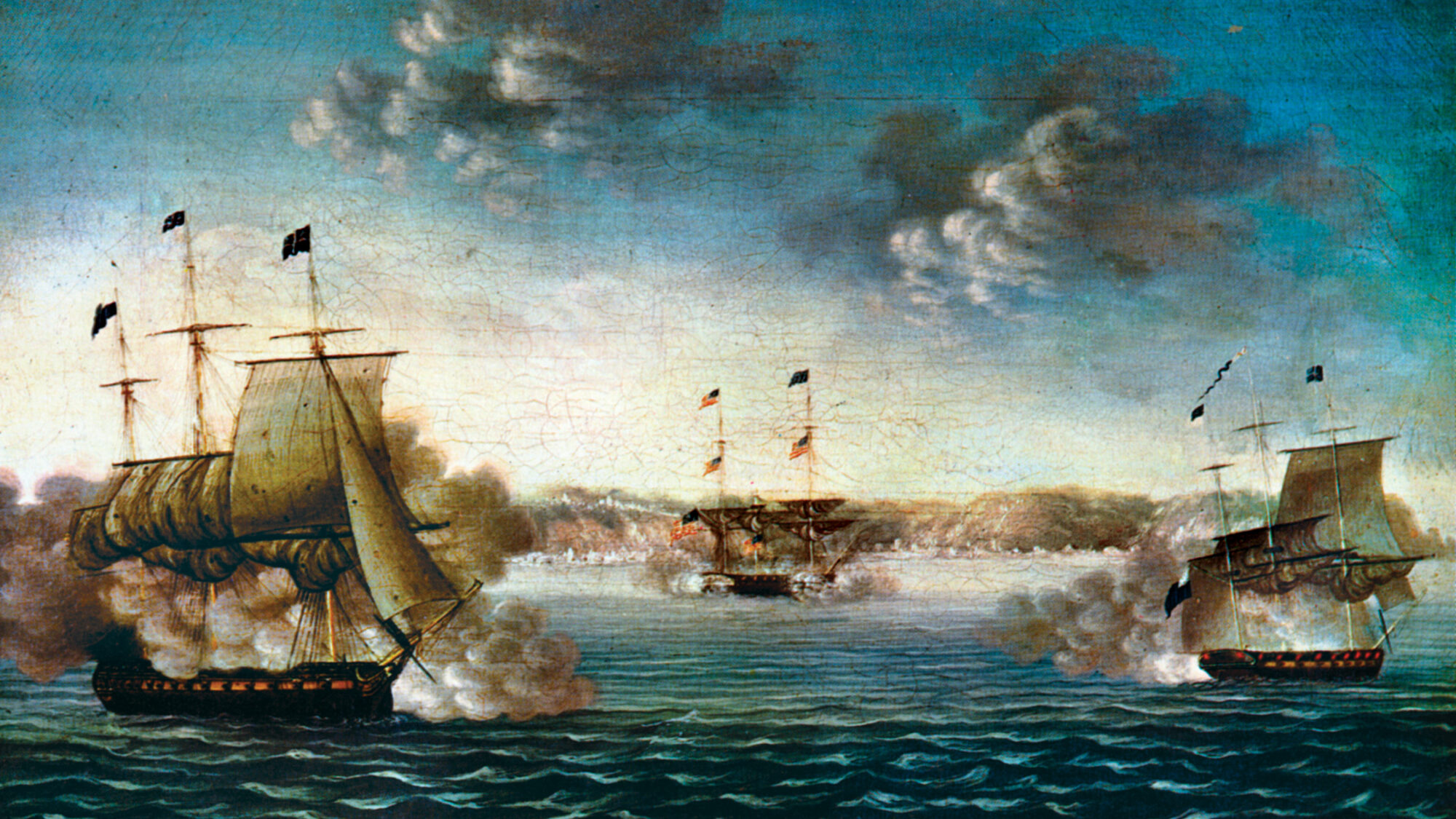
c. 1819 painting of Essex (center) at the Battle of Valparaíso

Despite Porter's complaints to the US Navy on several occasions, Essex was armed almost entirely with powerful but short-range 32-pounder carronades that gave Phoebe, armed with long 18-pounders, a decisive advantage at long range. For 2 1/2 hours, Phoebe and Cherub bombarded Essex from long range, where Essex could only resist with her few long 12-pounders. Fires twice erupted aboard Essex, at which point about fifty men abandoned the ship and swam for shore, only half of them landing; the British saved sixteen. Eventually, the hopeless situation forced Porter to surrender. Essex had suffered 58 dead and 31 missing of her crew of 214. The British lost four men dead and seven wounded on Phoebe, and one dead and three wounded on Cherub. (Note: A first-class share of a portion of the prize money for Essex was worth £619 17s; a sixth-class share, that of an ordinary seaman, was worth £7 13s 6d. The second distribution occurred on 24 October 1815 for which the value of a first-class share was worth £299 2s 9d; a sixth-class share was worth £3 2s. A first-class share of the final distribution was worth £153 6s 6d; a sixth-class share was worth £3 2s.)

The then Lieutenant William Bolton Finch was said to have served with distinction on the Essex between 1812 and 1814.

== British service and fate ==
Because Essex was stored and provisioned for six months, and capable of sailing to Europe without "the slightest cause for alarm", Captain Hillyar placed Lieutenant C. Pearson in command of her for the voyage to England, supported by acting lieutenant Allen Francis Gardiner. Essex arrived in England in November. There, the Admiralty had her repaired and taken into the Royal Navy as HMS Essex.

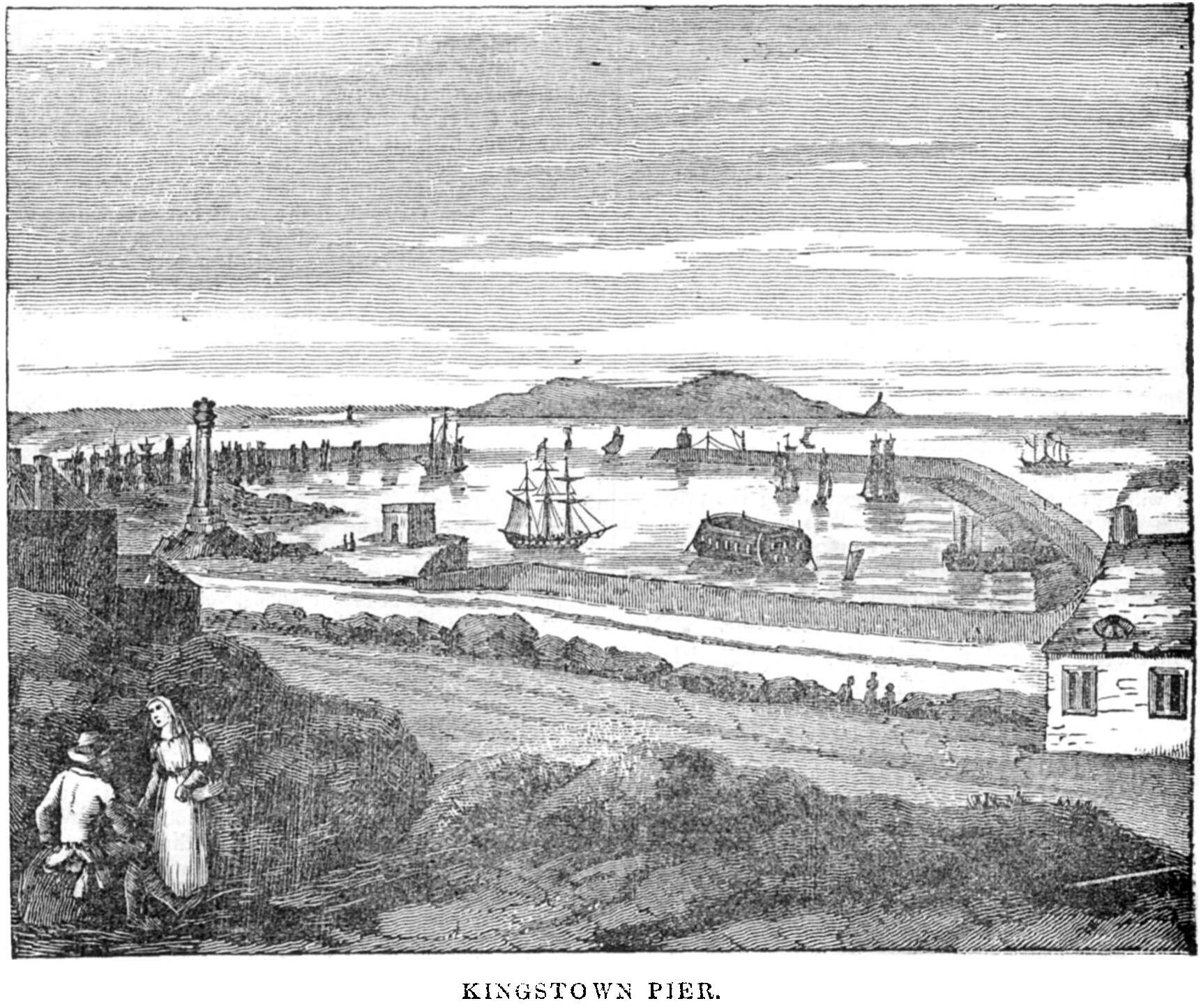
In service as a prison ship at Kingstown, 1834, Dublin Penny Journal

The Royal Navy never fitted her for sea, but re-classed her as a 42-gun ship. She served as a troopship on 7 July 1819. She was hulked at Cork to serve as a prison ship in Ireland in October 1823, and between 1824 and 1834 served in this capacity at Kingstown. On 6 June 1837 she was sold at public auction for £1,230.

During early 21st century resurfacing work on the east pier of Dún Laoghaire harbour, Essex's permanent mooring anchor was discovered embedded in the pier.

== In literature and popular culture ==
Herman Melville wrote about Essex in "Sketch Fifth" in The Encantadas, focusing on an incident off the Galápagos Islands with an elusive British ship. The story was first published in 1854 in Putnam's Magazine.

Patrick O'Brian adapted the story of Essex's attack on British whalers for his novel The Far Side of the World.

The 1950 American film Tripoli is a fictionalized account of the Battle of Derne, and USS Essex is shown in it.

== See also ==
- List of ships captured in the 19th century
- Bibliography of early American naval history
