= Essex Street (disambiguation) =

Essex Street may refer to:

- Essex Street, London
- Essex Street, Manhattan, New York City
- Essex Street station (NJ Transit), Hackensack, New Jersey
- Essex Street station (Hudson–Bergen Light Rail), Jersey City, New Jersey
- Delancey Street/Essex Street station, New York City subway

== See also ==
- Essex Street Chapel
- Essex Street Market
