= Yeagle =

Yeagle is a surname. Notable people with the surname include:

- Bill Yeagle (born 1938), former American football player and coach
- Dean Yeagle (born 1947), American animator and cartoonist
- Philip Yeagle, American biologist
