= Mark Tapio Kines =

American film director

Kines on the set of Claustrophobia (2002)

Mark Tapio Kines (born 1970, Danvers, Massachusetts) is an American film director, writer, producer and owner of Los Angeles–based Cassava Films. Kines is perhaps best known for being the first filmmaker to employ crowdfunding to partially finance a film.

== Biography ==
Kines grew up in Cupertino, California. In 1989, he began studying film and experimental animation at California Institute of the Arts and graduated in 1992 with a BFA in film, with emphasis in experimental animation. After graduating, Kines moved to Los Angeles and began working full-time as a graphic designer, including a four-year stint at Paramount Pictures in Hollywood where he worked as art director for the official Star Trek and Entertainment Tonight websites.

== Foreign Correspondents and the dawn of crowdfunding ==
In 1996 Kines began writing what would become his first feature film, Foreign Correspondents. The film went into production in 1997, was released in 1999, and received distribution in 2001. The film was shot on 35mm and had a $500,000 budget.

The film stars Melanie Lynskey, Wil Wheaton, Corin Nemec and Yelena Danova and is split into two entirely separate stories, the first entitled "Dear Jenny" and the second "Love, Trevor."

After principal photography was completed, Kines and his producer did not have the money to finish the film. Kines then designed a website for the film, which raised over $125,000 in investments and donations during 1998. Kines was thus the first filmmaker in history to utilize crowdfunding to help finance a feature.

Foreign Correspondents was shown at several film festivals across the world and received mostly positive reviews. It was distributed independently on DVD by Kines and his producer.

== Claustrophobia ==
In January 2002 Kines began writing Claustrophobia. It had only three main speaking roles, which were given to Melanie Lynskey, Sheeri Rappaport, and Mary Lynn Rajskub. Judith O'Dea (who had starred in the classic zombie film Night of the Living Dead) also appeared in a small, non-speaking role.

The film was distributed in North America in 2004 by Lionsgate Home Entertainment, who changed the title to Serial Slayer.

== The Closest Thing to Time Travel ==
In late 2005, Kines entered a pitch in a one-minute film competition sponsored by stock photo company Getty Images. His pitch, a bittersweet sci fi-tinged tone poem entitled The Closest Thing to Time Travel, was selected as one of only 30 pitches (out of over 240 entries) to be turned into short films using Getty stock footage material. In early 2006 Kines finished his film, and when the competition was open to the public for final voting, The Closest Thing to Time Travel won Kines the Grand Prize of $10,000 and trips to New York City, Chicago, and Bozeman, Montana, where Kines was a speaker at HATCHfest.

== Other work ==
In 2005, Kines began working as a freelance copywriter, creating trivia-based content for the Blu-ray releases of several major studio films, and for the well-received end credit sequence for the 2010 comedy The Other Guys.

Kines wrote and/or directed several short films after The Closest Thing to Time Travel, including Portrait of a Pensive Lady (2008), Party Pooper (2008), and Ron and Nancy (2010).

In 2013, Kines authored and hosted an online screenwriting course on Lynda.com, later owned by LinkedIn Learning.

In 2015, Kines crowdfunded a short film called 20 Matches, which he wrote, produced, and directed. It was screened at several major film festivals in 2016, including Seattle International Film Festival, Nashville Film Festival, Bucheon International Fantastic Film Festival, Ashland Independent Film Festival and Sarasota Film Festival. His next short, 2019's Words to Live by, screened at very few festivals and stalled his filmmaking career.

In 2022, Kines launched a personal project called L.A. Street Names, a website and social media account where he researches and writes about the origins of street names across Los Angeles County. It is an ongoing project, with over 1,500 street names published as of January 2023.

== Filmography ==
- Foreign Correspondents (1999)
- Claustrophobia (2003)
