= Jakob Skrzypa =

Canadian comedy writer, director, and producer

Jakob Skrzypa is a Canadian comedy writer, director, and producer known for The Historical History of Canada, Vampire Zombies... from Space! and Your Money's No Good Here.

== Filmography ==
Year	Title	Type	Role	Notes
2026	The Historical History of Canada	Web Series	Director, Writer, Producer, Editor	Produced by New Metric Media (Shoresy, Letterkenny)
2024	Vampire Zombies... from Space!	Feature	Writer, Producer, Editor	Available on Amazon Prime, AppleTV, Tubi
2023	Your Money's No Good Here	Short	Director, Writer, Producer, Editor	Fantasia (World Premiere) Toronto After Dark (Won, Best Canadian Short - Silver)

== Television Work ==
Year	Title	Season	Role	Network
2026	The Challenge: Cutthroat	42	Producer	Paramount+
2025	The Snake	1	Producer	FOX
2024	The Challenge: Battle of the Eras	40	Producer	MTV
2023	The Challenge USA	2	Producer	CBS
2023	Vanderpump Villa	1	Producer	Hulu
2022	The Challenge: World Championship	1	Producer	Paramount+
2022	The Challenge USA	1	Producer	CBS
2021	The Challenge: All-Stars	3	Producer	MTV
2018	Survivor: Edge of Extinction	38	Dream Team	CBS
2018	Survivor: David vs. Goliath	37	Dream Team	CBS
2016	Decker: Mindwipe	6	Production Assistant	Adult Swim
2016	Decker: Unclassified	5	Production Assistant	Adult Swim
2016	Nathan For You	4	Production Assistant	Comedy Central

== Sketches & Early Work ==
====== Fun Uncle ======
From 2013 - 2020 Jakob served as one half of sketch comedy duo Fun Uncle alongside frequent collaborator Luke Mitchell. Together the duo wrote, directed, edited, and produced 40+ sketches and shorts which were featured in the Windsor International Film Festival, Toronto Lost Episode Festival and appeared on Funny or Die.

== Other Appearances ==
Jakob has appeared as a guest on episode Found Footage Festival's VCR Party Live, a cameo role in Lloyd Kaufman's Shakespeare's Shitstorm, and a blink-and-you-miss-it background appearance in S4E07 of Nathan for You.
