= The Letter People =

Children's literacy program

The Letter People is an American children’s literacy program built around 26 anthropomorphic characters that represent the letters of the alphabet. Conceived in the mid-1960s by teachers Elayne Reiss-Weimann and Rita Friedman, the classroom materials were commercialized by New Dimensions in Education, Inc. beginning in 1968 and adopted in thousands of schools. The program’s early offerings, including Alpha One (grades 1–2) and Alpha Time (kindergarten), used stories, songs, filmstrips, and inflatable “Huggables” to teach letter–sound correspondence and early reading skills.

The Alpha Time program later expanded to television with a 60-episode, 15-minute series produced at KETC in St. Louis, which premiered on March 13, 1974 and later aired widely on public-television and educational stations. The original program and show drew attention for their gendered cast (consonants as “Mister,” vowels as “Miss”), which prompted debate and subsequent content adjustments in the 1970s.

Ownership changed in 1990 to Abrams & Co., which substantially revised the characters and curriculum in 1996 and later integrated the property into the DIG Pre-K program after Abrams merged into Abrams Learning Trends. In 2019, Excelligence Learning Corporation acquired the program and folded it into its Frog Street subsidiary; Frog Street later discontinued DIG Pre-K, ending new production associated with The Letter People.

== Original program ==
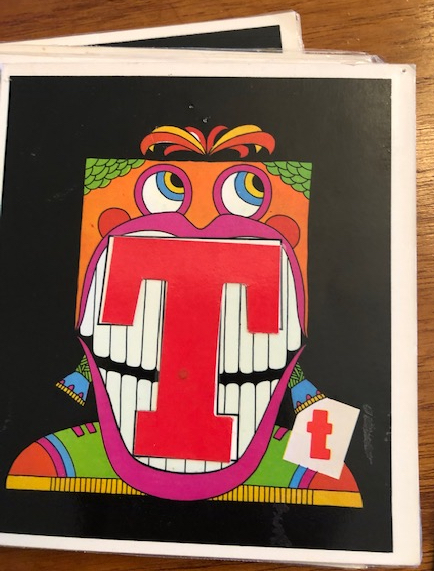
A greeting card from the Alpha One program that shows the 1968 version of Mister T and his Tall Teeth

Elayne Reiss-Weimann and Rita Friedman, two teachers from George Miller Elementary in Nanuet, New York, created the concept of Letter People. In 1964, first-grade teacher Reiss-Weimann formed the original idea for the Letter People. She had struggled daily to draw the attention of her 24 students (who were typical first-graders, eager and rambunctious) in a distraction-fond hallway classroom at the overcrowded school. Weimann collaborated with an early childhood coordinator, Rita Friedman, to create an educational program that revolved around 26 anthropomorphic characters, each representing a letter of the alphabet, to teach beginning readers how to "decode" or "sound out" the consonants and vowels that form words. They embodied the basic rules of phonics into stories about this clan of make-believe pictograms called the Letter People.

Each letter of the alphabet had a distinct characteristic to help children learn not only the letter but the sound the letter represents in the written word. For example, Mister M has a munching mouth, Mister N has a noisy nose and Mister T has tall teeth. The characters were painted on large, two-dimensional portrait cards. Each character was given an engaging personality to help the teacher bring her or him alive in the classroom, and each character had a song (or a poem at the time) to help children recall the distinguishing feature and sound. With the help of the Letter People, children remained on-task, learned more quickly, and retained what they learned. From the beginning, the children viewed the Letter People like real people and not just letters of the alphabet, phonics devices, or toys. On one occasion, when the Letter People had to be shipped to another school, the children insisted that holes would be placed in the boxes so that the Letter People could breathe as they traveled.

Weimann and Friedman later sold the idea in 1968 to the newly founded New Dimensions in Education, Inc. (based in Plainview, New York, and later in Norwalk, Connecticut) which, in turn, copyrighted and published The Letter People educational products in April 1969. NDE developed the concept into classroom programs: Alpha One in 1968, and Alpha Time in 1972. Subsequently, NDE entered into a licensing agreement with Arista, granting Arista the exclusive rights to distribute The Letter People materials in schools and libraries, while NDE retained control over the home and trade markets.

Both program's basic concept was simple: Each letter of the English alphabet was represented by a unique character with traits derived from itself. The consonants were males (as the Letter Boys) and the vowels were females (as the Letter Girls, whom there could be no word without). Reiss-Weimann and Friedman also wrote two series of books about the characters, Read-to-Me (1972–1978) and Fables from the Letter People (1988–1989). Liz Callen illustrated all the books of the latter series. Each Letter Person also had an accompanying song (available on cassette, eight track, and vinyl record), and inflatable vinyl effigies in two sizes 12 to 14 in (300 to 360 mm) or 30 in (760 mm) a.k.a. "life-size") known as "Huggables". Other merchandise included filmstrips, flash cards, giant picture cards, board games, puzzles, other educational vinyl records, and coloring sheets. Educators who adopted the program were trained in its implementation, and The Letter People was soon picked up by over 37,000 schools across the US.

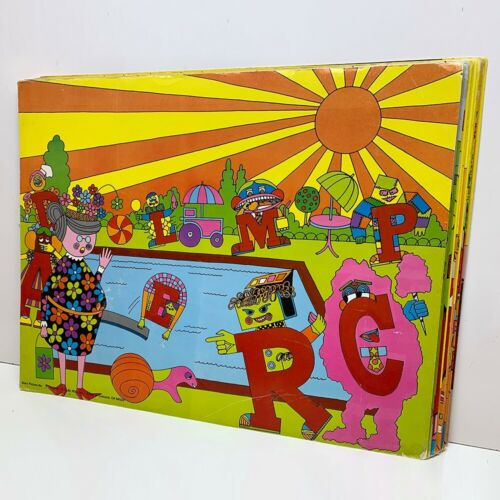
One of many giant picture cards used to teach various scenarios with the Letter People characters

=== Alpha One ===
Alpha One, also known as Alpha One: Breaking the Code, was a first and second grade program introduced in 1968, and revised in 1974, that was designed to teach children to read and write sentences containing words containing three syllables in length and to develop within the child a sense of his own success and fun in learning to read by using the Letter People characters. Alpha One's game-like approach capitalized upon the child's sense of fun and imagination to develop interest in learning to read and spell. Learning letter symbols and sounds, mastering rules of word formation, and reading and writing are byproducts of the interaction between the child and his 26 "Letter People" friends, his participation in creative and dramatic play, his enjoyment of activities associated with specially developed filmstrips and recorded stories and rhymes, and his programmed success in a variety of visual and auditory discrimination "Letter People" games. This program is the precursor to the Alpha Time program.

==== Contents of the Alpha One Kit ====
Nearly all of the following materials have been described in conjunction with explaining the games and activities used during Alpha One lessons. In addition, teachers could also buy more materials through the NDE catalog along with the base program. The contents of the base Alpha One Kit are listed below with explanation:

- Letter People and Symbol Cards: A collection of 26 durable placards (14” x 16”) each featuring a Letter Person illustration, along with four symbol charts to support phonetic decoding.
- Story Pictures and Easel: Large illustrated story scenes (19" x 24") used to visualize the stories; the accompanying easel was built to display both the scenes and the Letter People characters.
- Letter Meeting Greeting Packets and Alphabet Sheets: Each packet contained 35 greeting cards per letter, supporting the introductory activities for each Letter Person.
- Chatterbooks: A set of 35 student activity booklets designed for phonics, spelling, and word recognition exercises.
- Puppets and Stage: Provided with rhymed scripts, the puppets and stage encouraged dramatic play and reading aloud.
- Chalkboards: Reusable individual slates given to students to practice writing and decoding skills.
- Chatter Album: A 12", 33 1/3 rpm vinyl record that reinforced vowel sounds and foundational phonics lessons.
- Filmstrips: Humorous animated segments designed to reinforce sound-symbol association and character traits.
- Duplicating Masters: A collection of 50 reproducible worksheets for student assessment and take-home review to share with families.
- Professional Guide: A step-by-step instructional manual for teachers with structured lesson plans for each unit.
- Alpha Wagon: A mobile storage unit designed to hold and transport all components of the program conveniently.

=== Alpha Time ===
Alpha Time, also known as Alpha Time: Beginning Reading, was a kindergarten program introduced in 1971, and revised in 1976 and 1980 that was meant to help children develop oral communication; dramatic play; oral/aural discrimination; visual discrimination and letter identification; and social living through the use of the Letter People. In Alpha Time, kindergarteners were introduced to the child-sized vinyl characters commonly known as the Huggables", which were large enough for small children to hug (though there were smaller-sized Huggables as well), instead of the 2D picture cards used in the 1st and 2nd grade Alpha One program. Alpha Time was meant to be used before Alpha One to introduce children to these basic concepts.

==== Contents of the Alpha Time Kit ====
- 144 Picture Squares: Illustrated cards linked to the sounds of Letter People characters, used in sorting, matching, counting, and visual/auditory discrimination activities.
- Five 12” RPM Disc Recordings: Audio materials that reinforced phonics and storytelling through music and narration.
- 27 Puzzles: Interlocking puzzles that increased in difficulty and helped children connect letters to sounds and images, supporting both phonetic awareness and fine motor development.
- 162 Duplicating Masters: Illustrated reproducible worksheets used for daily practice and parent engagement. Each included teacher notes and letters home that explained the learning process.
- Six Filmstrips: Colorful short films designed to reinforce key concepts and facilitate group discussion about shapes, sizes, locations, and numbers.
- Four "Read to Me" Books: Illustrated stories about four of the Letter People, intended for classroom read-alouds or paired with recordings for independent listening.
- 420 Picture Books: Seventy copies each of six different picture readers, reflecting familiar classroom situations to ensure accessibility for children of all backgrounds.
- The Huggables: Inflatable vinyl versions of the Letter People characters, available in two sizes (12–14 inches and 30 inches), designed for physical interaction and dramatic play.
- 16 Giant Picture Cards: Large illustrations of daily experiences or class-told stories, used to promote oral communication, storytelling, and comprehension through role play.
- 2 Board Games: Colorful educational games that increased in complexity as more characters were introduced. These supported phonemic awareness, memory, and following directions.
- 4 Decks of Playing Cards: Used in conjunction with the board games to provide additional opportunities for matching and letter-sound practice.
- Professional Guide: A teacher’s manual with structured, adaptable daily lesson plans, including an “On Their Own” section suggesting independent enrichment or reinforcement activities.

=== Reception and criticism ===
==== Gender controversy ====
The original Letter People program faced significant criticism in the early 1970s for its gendered portrayal of the alphabet, with vowels depicted as female ("Miss A," "Miss E," etc.) and consonants as male ("Mister B," "Mister C," etc.). Feminist groups and educators objected to how female characters were often portrayed as weak, emotional, or dependent on male characters, while male characters were depicted as strong and active.

In 1972, Suffolk Women's Liberation, led by kindergarten teacher Lois Rodriguez, protested the program as "blatantly sexist," citing examples like a poem where a consonant declares, "A girl's no good for work or play." The group met with publisher Dr. Bernard Kauderer of New Dimensions in Education, who defended the program's emphasis on cooperation but acknowledged some content could be revised. The Suffolk County Human Rights Commission investigated the complaints, with commissioner W. Burghardt Turner questioning whether the program reinforced children's biases rather than challenging them.

While some educators and students defended the program - including first-graders who wrote letters pleading to keep their "letter people" - critics like educator Thelma Taub argued that "reading can be fun without the stereotypes." In response to the criticism, publisher Ruth Lerner agreed to modify some content, such as reducing the number of crying female vowels, but maintained the gendered structure was essential to the program. Additionally, some vowel characters who received particularly pointed criticism, including Miss I (originally "Itchy Itch") and Miss O (originally "Obstinate"), were later revised to become the "Incredible Inventor" and "Optimistic Optimist" respectively after the television series' run.

== Television series ==
The Letter People
- Country of origin: United States
- No. of episodes: 60

Production
- Running time: 15 minutes

Original release
- Network: PBS
- Release: March 13, 1974 – 1976

lan J. Pratt, Ph.D., a director and vice-president of NDE, Inc. approached KETC-TV, a PBS affiliate in St. Louis, Missouri, about creating a TV series based on the escapades of the Letter People. After five pilot programs were produced, Dr. Pratt approached the Council of Great City Schools (the 20 largest school districts in the US). Eventually, with the cooperation of the superintendents of the Council, NDE, and KETC-TV, a joint venture commenced. The series was originally planned to comprise 120 15-minute episodes, but only 60 were produced. Despite this, it became extremely popular nationwide among children who were learning to read. To ensure phonetic and linguistic accuracy in the television production process, Ruth Lerner from NDE served as the Editorial Supervisor. Pratt was the Curriculum Consultant for the TV series. Tom McDonough of KETC-TV was the series' writer-director. While thousands of children were learning about the Letter People in school, thousands of others were being exposed to them through the television series based on the program. The show was extremely popular with children, and it quickly spread to over 105 other television stations across the country, via syndication, mainly to PBS and educational stations. The television series premiered on March 13, 1974.

The filming of "Meet Mr. Q".

The Letter People (relatively primitive puppets) undertake various adventures in Letter People Land, a dark, featureless place populated by strange people and creatures. Episodes usually focus on introducing new Letter People or new sounds formed by combining two Letter People together (such as /CH/ or /OU/). Other episodes take the Letter People to more exotic (though still featureless) locales such as outer space (eventually, the show would include more standard scenery, like cityscapes, meadows, Miss O's opera house, etc.), while a few highlight the characters' conflicts over various sounds (such as Mister C fighting Mister K for his sound). Another common feature of the show is the Catching Game, which is a game show hosted by Monty Swell (who is a character based on Monty Hall) where the Letter People must form words by positioning themselves correctly side-by-side.

=== Opening and closing sequence ===
A little dog is minding his own business when various figures (including a female figure carrying a bunch of helium balloons) enter the gates of Letter People Land as the song plays:

Come and meet the Letter People
Come and visit the family
Words are made of Letter People
A, B, C, D, follow me

=== Episode guide ===
No.	Episode title	Director	Writer	Original airdate
1	Meet Mister M	Thomas K. McDonough	Thomas K. McDonough	March 13, 1974
2	Meet Mister T	Thomas K. McDonough	Thomas K. McDonough	1974
3	Meet Mister F	Thomas K. McDonough	Thomas K. McDonough	1974
4	Meet Mister H	Thomas K. McDonough	Thomas K. McDonough	1974
5	Meet Mister N	Thomas K. McDonough	Thomas K. McDonough	1974
6	Meet Mister B	Thomas K. McDonough	Thomas K. McDonough	1974
7	Meet Miss A	Thomas K. McDonough	Thomas K. McDonough	1974
8	What's the Catch?	Thomas K. McDonough	Thomas K. McDonough	1974
9	The Tryout	Thomas K. McDonough	Thomas K. McDonough	1974
10	The Catching Game	Thomas K. McDonough	Thomas K. McDonough	1974
11	Meet Mister Z	Thomas K. McDonough	William F. Bailey	1974
12	Meet Mister P	Gary Twitchell	Thomas K. McDonough	1974
13	Meet Mister S	Thomas K. McDonough	Thomas K. McDonough and William F. Bailey	1974
14	Meet Miss E	Thomas K. McDonough	William F. Bailey	1974
15	Meet Miss I	Gary Twitchell	William F. Bailey	1974
16	Meet Miss O	Gary Twitchell	William F. Bailey	1974
17	Meet Miss U	Thomas K. McDonough	William F. Bailey	1974
18	Meet Mister V	Thomas K. McDonough	Thomas K. McDonough	1974
19	Meet Mister L	Gary Twitchell	William F. Bailey	1974
20	The Story of Mister V; The Story of Mister S	Gary Twitchell	William F. Bailey	1974
21	The Squoosh	Thomas K. McDonough	William F. Bailey	1974
22	Meet Mister D	Gary Twitchell	Gayle Waxman	1974
23	Meet Mister G	Thomas K. McDonough	Gayle Waxman	1974
24	Meet Mister C	Thomas K. McDonough	Harry John Luecke	1974
25	Meet Mister K	Thomas K. McDonough	William F. Bailey	1974
26	The Story of Mister C and Mister K; Soft C	Thomas K. McDonough	William F. Bailey	1974
27	Meet Mister W	Thomas K. McDonough	Gayle Waxman	1974
28	Long Vowel Sounds	Thomas K. McDonough	William F. Bailey	1974
29	Cooperation (Silent E)	Thomas K. McDonough	Gayle Waxman	1974
30	Adjacent Vowels (Two Vowels Standing Side-by-Side)	Thomas K. McDonough	Gayle Waxman	1974
31	Review I	Jeffrey Jones	Jeffrey Jones	1975
32	Review II	Jeffrey Jones	Jeffrey Jones	1975
33	Review III	Jeffrey Jones	Thomas K. McDonough	1975
34	Review IV	Jeffrey Jones	Thomas K. McDonough	1975
35	Meet Mister Y	Thomas K. McDonough	William F. Bailey	1975
36	Y as a Consonant and a Vowel	Thomas K. McDonough	William F. Bailey	1975
37	Meet Mister J	Thomas K. McDonough	William F. Bailey and Patrick Clear	1975
38	Soft G	Thomas K. McDonough	Thomas K. McDonough	1975
39	Meet Mister R	Thomas K. McDonough	Gayle Waxman, Patrick Clear and Thomas K. McDonough	1975
40	Star Trip, part I (AR)	Jeffrey Jones	Ron Cohen	1975
41	Star Trip, part II (OR)	Jeffrey Jones	Ron Cohen	1975
42	Star Trip, part III (ER, IR, UR)	Jeffrey Jones	Ron Cohen	1975
43	Review V	Thomas K. McDonough	Thomas K. McDonough	1975
44	Meet Mister X	Thomas K. McDonough	Thomas K. McDonough and James Scott	1975
45	Meet Mister Q	Thomas K. McDonough	James Scott	1975
46	The Word Machine (Runaway Words)	Jeffrey Jones	Ralph St. William	1975
47	Chewy Cherry Choo-Choo (CH)	Thomas K. McDonough	Thomas K. McDonough	1975
48	The Thing (TH)	Jeffrey Jones	Ralph St. William	1975
49	WH and SH	Jeffrey Jones	Thomas K. McDonough	1975
50	Review VI	Thomas K. McDonough	Thomas K. McDonough	1975
51	The -ING Sound, part I	Jeffrey Jones	Ralph St. William	1975
52	The -ING Sound, part II	Jeffrey Jones	Ralph St. William	1975
53	Words in Parts, part I	Thomas K. McDonough	Ralph St. William	1975
54	Words in Parts, part II	Thomas K. McDonough	Ralph St. William	1975
55	OU and OW	Jeffrey Jones	Ralph DiGuglielmo	1976
56	OI and OY	Thomas K. McDonough	Ralph DiGuglielmo	1976
57	Double O (OO)	Thomas K. McDonough	Ralph DiGuglielmo	1976
58	AU and AW	Jeffrey Jones	Ralph DiGuglielmo	1976
59	Sentences, part I	Jeffrey Jones	Jeffrey Jones	1976
60	Sentences, part II	Thomas K. McDonough	Thomas K. McDonough	1976

=== Availability ===
The show continued to air reruns on PBS stations until late 1994. NDE released the show's episodes on a 5-tape VHS set of Letter People "Learning Advantage Videos" as part of the Letter People curriculum in 1995; on the other hand, fans have preserved the episodes on many VHS recordings taped off of TV while the show was still on the air, and various DVDs having the episodes preserved can be found from time to time on auction sites such as eBay. The entire series has been preserved online.

== Revised ==
In 1990, Abrams & Co. Publishers Inc. (founded in 1989) of Austin, Texas, bought the rights to The Letter People from the previous owner, Norwalk, Connecticut-based New Dimensions in Education, Inc. At first, the company slightly revised the program, such as adding lowercase letters to the back of each Letter Person (previously they had been placed on each character somewhat randomly), but in 1996, they gave the program a major update, completely redesigning the look of the characters (however, some Letter People keep half of their designs from their original counterparts) and the associated materials, and also made sweeping changes to many of the Letter People, especially over half of their genders themselves, most obviously equalizing the proportion of male to female characters (vowels are now distinguished by their ability to light up via "LetterLights", which appear as yellow suns on their right shoulders). The male characters' names changed from "Mister" to "Mr.", and the female characters' names changed from "Miss" to "Ms.". Most of the characters' associated characteristics were changed as well, such as all references to "junk food" being swapped for non-food-related characteristics (Mr. D's "delicious donuts" were exchanged for "dazzling dance", for example) and any Letter Person that Abrams deemed as expressing negative images being changed to be more positive (Mr. H's horrible hair became happy hair instead, Mr. R's Ripping RubberBands became Rainbow Ribbons, and Mr. X was no longer all wrong and became different, albeit still mixed-up).

New Letter People storybooks were written, many with simple rebus and decodable words. In 2002, a newer "Read-to-Me" book series was also written, with an eye toward teaching conflict resolution and problem-solving skills, and features a variety of genres including storybook, mystery, biography, poetry, and nonfiction.

The program is divided into three levels with increasing emphasis on phonics: Let's Begin with the Letter People for preschool, Land of the Letter People for kindergarten, and Lives of the Letter People for first grade. The program has been taught to about 35 million children.

Though the program is generally well received by educators, some have criticized its strong focus on phonics at the expense of other literacy-building techniques.

In 2008, after Abrams & Co. Publishers, Inc. was acquired by Learning Trends and merged into Abrams Learning Trends, The Letter People program, along with other Abrams & Co. Publishers properties, eventually became incorporated into the DIG Pre-K curriculum.

In the early 2010s, four new Letter People characters were added to the program in order to teach children Spanish. The four characters are Srta. Ch, Sr. Ll, Srta. Ñ and Sr. Rr.

In May 2019, Abrams Learning Trends, along with its properties including The Letter People characters, was acquired by Excelligence Learning Corporation and became incorporated into a subsidiary of Frog Street Press, thus causing Abrams Learning Trends to cease operations as an individual company. As of September 21, 2020, The Letter People had no more new content made but the franchise continued to be kept alive as a learning unit of the DIG Pre-K program, with the hand puppets, certain educational materials, a CD with the songs, and most of the big books of the Letter People (all only available for purchase as part of the DIG Pre-K program) having been available on Frog Street Enterprises' online store until early 2024. All discontinued material such as worksheets, flashcards, the Huggables, and other books of the Letter People are still available second-hand from time to time through other online stores such as eBay.

As of February 1, 2024, Frog Street Press discontinued the DIG Pre-K program, ending the life of the Letter People.

== The Number Workers ==
Along with the original program of The Letter People, its mathematics-equivalent program The Number Workers was also created. The Number Workers are referred to as the numerical cousins of the Letter People from a planet called "Number Workers World" and were created to help children learn not only about numbers, their sounds and how many there are in each number, but also symbols, mathematics, time, addition, and measurement. They range from numbers 1–9 with the odd numbers being males (as the Number Boys) and the even numbers being females (as the Number Girls). Each Number Person carries a number of objects to teach children how many there are to represent the number (such as Mister 1 having "only one of everything: a one-legged table, a one-legged chair, one microscope, one test tube and one clock with one hand"), and also represents the job they employ: Mister 1 as a scientist, Miss 2 as a doctor, Mister 3 as a pilot, Miss 4 as a construction worker, Mister 5 as a sports player, Miss 6 as a shape stacker, Mister 7 as an ice-cream salesman, Miss 8 as a photographer and Mister 9 as a magician. (Note that the Number Workers are called "Number People" even though they are never referred to the Number People in the official program.)

Unlike The Letter People, The Number Workers (and its later revamped version "The Number People") was lesser-known and had very few products, including an Alpha Math workbook (Number World Book), flashcards, giant picture cards, a teacher's guide, and a vinyl-containing accompanying songs for each Number Worker.

== The Number People ==
When The Letter People program was revamped in 1996, The Number Workers program was also revamped along with it and was renamed "The Number People". This version features five males (Mr. 0, Mr. 2, Mr. 4, Mr. 5 and Mr. 9) and six females (Ms. 1, Ms. 3, Ms. 6, Ms. 7, Ms. 8 and Ms. 10), with two new numbers introduced, which are 0 and 10. Each Number Person has the numeral placed to the top-right corner of his/her uniform, while a number word was also added to the back of each Number Person. A Spanish-language version was also available to teach the Spanish names of the numbers.

== Place where the Letter People live ==
In the original 1968 program, the place where the Letter People live was originally a fictional town called "Letter People Land" but, when the program was revised in 1990, it was renamed the "Land of the Letter People". As the newly revised program in 1996 utilized the newer version of the characters and town structures, the name of the Letter People's residence still remained the same.

== List of Letter People ==
Original Program (1968)	Characteristic	Revised Program (1996)	Characteristic
Miss A	A'choo	Ms. A	A'choo
Mister B	Beautiful Buttons	Mr. B	Beautiful Buttons
Mister C	Cotton Candy	Mr. C	Colossal Cap
Mister D	Delicious Doughnuts	Mr. D	Dazzling Dance
Miss E	Exercise	Ms. E	Exercise Energy
Mister F	Funny Feet	Mr. F	Funny Feet
Mister G	Gooey Gum	Mr. G	Gooey Gum
Mister H	Horrible Hair	Mr. H	Happy Hair
Miss I*	Itchy Itch (originally)/Incredible Inventor	Ms. I	Impossible Inches
Mister J	Jumbled Junk	Mr. J	Jingle Jingle Jacket
Mister K	Kicking/Kind Kick	Mr. K	Kaboom Kick
Mister L	Lemon Lollipops	Mr. L	Longest Laugh
Mister M	Munching Mouth	Mr. M	Munching Mouth
Mister N	Noisy Nose	Mr. N	Noisy Nose
Miss O*	Obstinate (originally)/Optimistic Optimist	Ms. O	Opposite
Mister P	Pointy Patches	Mr. P	Pointy Patches
Mister Q	Quiet	Mr. Q*	Quiet Questions (originally); Questions
Mister R	(Ripping) Rubber Bands	Mr. R	Rainbow Ribbons
Mister S	Super Socks	Mr. S	Super Socks
Mister T	Tall Teeth	Mr. T	Tall Teeth
Miss U	Upsy-Daisy Umbrella	Ms. U	Unusual Umbrella
Mister V	Violet Velvet Vest	Mr. V	Vegetable Vest
Mister W	Wonderful Wink	Mr. W	Wonderful Words
Mister X	Mixed-Up/All Wrong	Mr. X	Different
Mister Y	Yawning	Mr. Y	Yodeling Yawn
Mister Z	Zipping Zippers	Mr. Z	Zipping Zippers

- Note: The characteristic of Miss I and Miss O changed shortly before The Letter People television series ended its run.
- Note: The characteristic of Mr. Q changed from "Quiet Questions" to just "Questions" to teach children that keeping your questions "quiet" will not answer them.

== Books ==
=== Read-to-Me (1972–1978) ===
- A – Ăćhoo^
- B – A Buttonmat for Beautiful Buttons^
- C – The Cotton Candy Caper^
- D – A Dozen Delicious Donuts*
- E – The Exercise Expert^
- F – Fantastic Funny Feet^
- G – Gooey Gum is Not For Chewing^
- H – Hat Helpers Hullabaloo^
- I – The Incredible Inventor^
- J – Jingling Jangling Joggers^
- K – The Longest Kick
- L – Lovely Lemon Lollies*
- M – Meet Me at the Market*
- N – The Noisy Nose Nanny^
- O – The Optimistic Optimist^
- P – Popping Pointy Patches^
- Q – To Be or Not To Be...Quiet^
- R – The Rubberband Roundup^
- S – The Super Sock Sensation^
- T – The Tale of Tall Toothbrush^
- U – A Most Unusual Umbrella^
- V – Vanishing Vests*
- W – Wonderful Winks and Weather Wishes^
- X – The Inimitable Mr. X
- Y – The Yawn-Maker^
- Z – Zipping Zippers Save the Zoo

^Unknown illustrator

*illustrated by James Razzi

=== Fables of the Letter People (1988–1989) ===
- A – The Ăćhoo Confusion
- B – Buttonyms for Safety
- C – The Cotton Candy Creature
- D – The Dictionary Doughnut Shop
- E – Exercise Entertainment
- F – Fantastic Friendship
- G – The Gooey Gumball Game
- H – The Hat House Hotel
- I – Inchy, the Incredible Invention
- J – Mr. J's Junkyard
- K – The Kazoo Kicker
- L – Lemonberry Lollipops
- M – Munching Magic
- N – Say No and Fly Away!
- O – Ostrich Express
- P – Parking Pandemonium
- Q – The Best Quiet Meter
- R – The Rubber Band Runner Champion
- S – Super Socks for Courage
- T – Tall Toothbrush Retires
- U – You Forget Too
- V – Valuable Volunteers
- W – The Worry Machine
- X – Mr. X's Mix-Ups
- Y – Yawn-Maker Wanted
- Z – Zip Codes

=== Let's Begin with the Letter People (1997–2000) ===
- A – The Apple Pie Man (written by Lynell Johnson; illustrated by Lane Yerkes)
- B – Mr. B's Buttons (written by Kathleen M. Fischer; illustrated by Barbara Yeagle)
- C – Come Out and Play (written by Cathy Torrisi; illistrated by Barbara Yeagle)
- D – Dinosaurs Dance! (written by Kathleen M. Fischer; illustrated by Dean Yeagle)
- E – What Does Everybody Need? (written by Lynell Johnson; illustrated by Lane Yerkes)
- F – Follow My Funny Feet (written by Lynell Johnson; illustrated by Lane Yerkes)
- G – Gubble, Bubble! (written by Irv Dweir; illustrated by Meg Ross)
- H – Where is Mr. H? (written by Lynell Johnson; illustrated by Meg Ross)
- I – If It Is... (written by Lynell Johnson; illustrated by Lane Yerkes)
- J – Just Listen (written by Kathleen M. Fischer; illustrated by Lane Yerkes)
- K – Ms. K's Kitchen (written by Lynell Johnson: illustrated by Meg Ross)
- L – Laugh with Me! (written by Irv Dweir; illustrated by Meg Ross)
- M – How Much Lunch? (written by Elayne Reiss-Weimann; illustrated by Meg Ross)
- N – What's My Name (written by Kathleen M. Fischer; illustrated by Lane Yerkes)
- O – Opposite! (written by Lynell Johnson; illustrated by Lane Yerkes)
- P – Pointy Patches Are for Me! (written by Cathy Torrisi; illustrated by Darcy Bell-Myers)
- Q – Questions, Questions (written by Alison G. Schmerler; illustrated by Dean Yeagle)
- R – What Is Red? (written by Kathleen M. Fischer; illustrated by Darcy Bell-Myers)
- S – Super Socks (written by Lynell Johnson; illustrated by Meg Ross)
- T – One Wonderful Smile (written by Kathleen M. Fischer; illustrated by Darcy Bell-Myers)
- U – Up, Up, Up and Away! (written by Lynell Johnson; illustrated by Lane Yerkes)
- V – This is the Way (written by Kathleen M. Fischer; illustrated by Barbara Yeagle)
- W – How's the Weather? (written by Lynell Johnson; illustrated by Lane Yerkes)
- X – My Upside-Down World (written by Kathleen M. Fischer; illustrated by Darcy Bell-Myers)
- Y – Yellow Yarn Yo-Yo (written by Kathleen M. Fischer; illustrated by Lane Yerkes)
- Z – Zip to the Zoo (written by Kathleen M. Hollenbeck; illustrated by Lane Yerkes)

=== Mini-Books (1999) ===
All books written by Lynell Johnson (but attributed to the Letter People) and illustrated by Thomas Sperling

- 1 - The Letter People (Ms. W)
- 2 - My Friends (LetterLight A)
- 3 - My Pals (LetterLight E)
- 4 - Letter People Rhymes (LetterLight I)
- 5 - My Friends and I (LetterLight O)
- 6 - The Last Letter People (LetterLight U)
- 7 - My Plan (LetterLight A)
- 8 - The Pan and the Man (LetterLight A and Mr. N)
- 9 - The Cat and the Rat (LetterLight A and Ms. T)
- 10 - A Cat on My Lap (Ms. P)
- 11 - Watch My Friends (LetterLight A)
- 12 - Mad, Sad and Glad (LetterLight I)
- 13 - Birthday Buttons (Mr. B)
- 14 - Jack and Jill (Ms. L)
- 15 - Big (Mr. G)
- 16 - Fun in the Sun (Ms. F)
- 17 - I Wish, We Wish (Ms. S and Mr. H)
- 18 - The Thing (Ms. T and Mr. H)
- 19 - Fun in the Tub (Mr. B)
- 20 - Tops and Pots (Ms. S)
- 21 - Mr. C's Backpack (Mr. C and Ms. K)
- 22 - Quack, Quack (Mr. Q)
- 23 - How Many Boxes? (Mr. X)
- 24 - Football Fun (Ms. S)
- 25 - A Gift for Mr. G (Mr. N and Mr. D)
- 26 - The Man and the Chimp (Mr. C and Mr. H)
- 27 - The Egg (LetterLight E)
- 28 - What I Like To Do (LetterLight I)
- 29 - That's Fine With Me (LetterLight I)
- 30 - What and Where (Mr. Q and LetterLight U)
- 31 - My Bike Ride (LetterLight I)
- 32 - It's Time (Mr. N)
- 33 - What I Like to Do (LetterLight A)
- 34 - A Nice Place (Mr. N)
- 35 - In the Pail (Ms. P)
- 36 - What We Like to Do (LetterLight E)
- 37 - Mr. N Calls 9-1-1 (LetterLight O)
- 38 - I Wanted Waffles (Ms. W)
- 39 - Fun in the Snow (Ms. W)
- 40 - The Boat Ride (Mr. B)
- 41 - Mr. H and the Honey Tree (LetterLight E)
- 42 - Ms. P's Sheep (LetterLight E)
- 43 - A Real Feast (LetterLight E)
- 44 - The Cute Cub (LetterLight U)
- 45 - Time to Fly (LetterLight U)
- 46 - At the Park (Ms. W)
- 47 - My Sport Report (Mr. B)
- 48 - When I Was Sick (Mr. N)
- 49 - A Cool Night (Mr. M)
- 50 - A True Story (Ms. W)
- 51 - The King and Queen (LetterLight and Ms. W)
- 52 - A Mouse in the House (LetterLight O and LetterLight U)
- 53 - Ms. Y's New Toy (LetterLight O)
- 54 - Art at Dawn (LetterLight A and Ms. W)

=== Take-Home Books (2000) ===
- All – Look At Us! (written by Cynthia Cappetta; illustrated by Barbara Yeagle)
- A – I See You and Me (written by Cynthia Cappetta; illustrated by Pattie Silver)
- B – I Made a Face (written by Cathy Torrisi; illustrated by Pattie Silver)
- B – Bugs at Camp (written by Beth Lyons; illustrated by Barbara Yeagle)
- C – My Cap (written by Cynthia Cappetta; illustrated by Lane Yerkes)
- D – My Dinosaur (written by Fran Lehr; illustrated by Thomas Sperling)
- D – Tap and Dip (illustrated by Dean Yeagle)
- E – Piglet Gets Wet (written by Beth Lyons; illustrated by Barbara Yeagle)
- F – I Like the Forest (written by Cathy Torrisi; illustrated by Barbara Yeagle)
- G – The Grab Bag (illustrated by Thomas Sperling)
- H – My House (written by Cathy Torrisi; illustrated by Dean Yeagle)
- I – I Measure (written by Patricia W. Abrams; illustrated by Thomas Sperling)
- I – Is It a Fit? (illustrated by Dean Yeagle)
- J – Jog and Jump (written by Patricia W. Abrams; illustrated by Thomas Sperling)
- K – Stop That Dog! (written by Fran Lehr; illustrated by Dean Yeagle)
- L – I See My Shadow (written by Colleen Barile; illustrated by Dean Yeagle)
- L – Fun in the Sun (written by Cathy Torrisi; illustrated by Darcy Bell-Myers)
- M – I Like to Munch (written by Cathy Torrisi; illustrated by Dean Yeagle)
- N – I Made Noise (written by Cathy Torrisi; illustrated by Thomas Sperling)
- O – Hop in the Mud (written by Beth Lyons; illustrated by Barbara Yeagle)
- P – The Farm (written by Cathy Torrisi; illustrated by Barbara Yeagle)
- Q – A Quiz (written by Kathleen Duffy; illustrated by Thomas Sperling)
- R – I Win! (illustrated by Pattie Silver)
- S – I See Rain (written by Cynthia Cappetta; illustrated by Dean Yeagle)
- S – At Bat (written by Beth Lyons; illustrated by Dean Yeagle)
- T – Friends (written by Cathy Torrisi; illustrated by Pattie Silver)
- U – In the Tub (written by Cathy Torrisi; illustrated by Dean Yeagle)
- U – Up and Down (illustrated by Barbara Yeagle)
- V – In the Van (illustrated by Barbara Yeagle)
- V – My Vest (illustrated by Pattie Silver)
- W – I Have Fun (illustrated by Barbara Yeagle)
- X – What A Mix Up! (written by Elayne Reiss-Weimann and Kathleen M. Fischer; illustrated by Darcy Bell-Myers)
- X – Am I Like Max? (written by Cynthia Cappetta; illustrated by Pattie Silver)
- Y – Did You Nap Yet? (written by Cathy Torrisi; illustrated by Dean Yeagle)
- Z – I Like Zippers (written by Elayne Reiss-Weimann; illustrated by Darcy Bell-Myers)

=== Read-to-Me (2002–2003) ===
- A – Who Will Help Ms. A? (written by Cathy Torrisi; illustrated by Crista K. Moehl
- B – Beautiful Buttons: A Biography on Mr. B (written by Cathy Torrisi; illustrated by Pattie Silver)
- C – The Clue (written by Amy O'Neil; illustrated by Crista K. Moehl)
- D – The Dinosaur Detective (written by Cathy Torrisi; illustrated by Thomas Sperling and Marcy R. Laska)
- E – Is It an Earthquake (written by Sallianne Norelli; illustrated by Dean Yeagle)
- F – The Fib (written by Sallianne Norelli; illustrated by Maggie Swanson and Rick Wetzel)
- G – Where Does the Garbage Go? (written by Cathy Torrisi; illustrated by Pattie Silver)
- H – The Right Day for a Haircut (written by Elayne Reiss-Weimann; illustrated by Darcy Bell-Myers)
- I – Incredible Insects: A Poetry ANThology (compiled by Mr. I; illustrated by Thomas Sperling and Margaret C. Ianniello)
- J – The Jazz Jamboree (written by Sallianne Norelli and Amy O'Neil; illustrated by Barbara Yeagle)
- K – KABOOM! (written by Kendall Martin, Elayne Reiss-Weimann and Rita Friedman; illustrated by Pattie Silver)
- L – Ha! Ha! Ha! (written by Alison G. Schmerler; illustrated by Dean Yeagle)
- M – The More the Merrier! (written by Sallianne Norelli; illustrated by William H. Peckmann and Luciano DiGeronimo)
- N – Not Now, Mr. N! (written by Cathy Torrisi; illustrated by Barbara Yeagle)
- O – The Opposite Obstacle Course (written by Sallianne Norelli; illustrated by Rick Wetzel)
- P – The Perfect Pet (written by Ginny Stiles; illustrated by Maggie Swanson and Rick Wetzel)
- Q – I'm Glad I Asked (written by Amy O'Neil; illustrated by Pattie Silver)
- R – Real Friends (written by Elayne Reiss-Weimann and Rita Friedman; illustrated by Barbara Yeagle)
- S – A Super Day for Sailing (written by Colleen Barile; illustrated by Bruce van Patter)
- T – Time for a Taxi (written by Ginny Stiles; illustrated by Darcy Bell-Myers)
- U – There's No Space Like Home (written by Amy O'Neil; illustrated by Bruce van Patter)
- V – Ms. V's Vacation (written by Patricia W. Abrams; illustrated by Darcy Bell-Myers)
- W – Weather Watch (written by Colleen Barile; illustrated by Dean Yeagle)
- X – I'm Different (written by Elayne Reiss-Weimann; illustrated by Dean Yeagle)
- Y – Just for You (written by Amy O'Neil; illustrated by Pattie Silver)
- Z – Who's New at the Zoo (written by Elayne Reiss-Weimann; illustrated by Rick Wetzel)

== Credits ==
=== Original program (1968) ===
==== Creative Team ====
- Elayne Reiss-Weimann and Rita Friedman – Creators
- Elizabeth Callen – illustrations
- Sharon Kovesdy – illustrations
- James Razzi – illustrations
- Barbara Yeagle – illustrations
- Ruth Lerner Perle – editorial Supervision
- Joe René and Jacquelyn Reinach – Music and Lyrics, Producers

==== Songs (1972) ====
- Paul Evans – Mister F, Mister N, Mister S

=== Television series (1974) ===
==== Creative Team ====
- Thomas K. McDonough – producer, director, writer
- Jeffrey Jones – producer, director, Writer
- Don Jeffries – executive producer
- Gary Twitchell – director
- William F. Bailey – director, writer
- King Hall – Head Puppeteer, Set Designer, Puppet Designer
- Tom Ray – Assistant Head Puppeteer, Puppet Designer
- Alan Pratt, Ph.D. – Curriculum Consultant
- Ruth Lerner Perle – editorial Supervisor
- Gayle Waxman – writer
- Harry John Luecke – writer
- Patrick Clear – writer
- Ron Cohen – writer
- James Scott – writer
- Ralph St. William – writer
- Ralph DiGuglielmo – writer
- Peter Bretz – Technical Producer
- John Muench – Technical Producer
- Filmgrafik International – Animation
- Vic Atkinson Productions – Animation
- Computer Image Corp. – Animation
- M-K Inc. – Animation
- Joe René and Jacquelyn Reinach – Music and Lyrics
- Clayton Frohman – Theme Song and "The Squoosh"
- Miles Goodman – Music
- Tom Tichenor – Puppet Designer
- Art FitzSimmons – Photography

==== Puppeteers and Voices ====
- King Hall – Mister M, Nardo (sometimes), Various
- Tom Ray – Mister W, Various
- Patrick Clear – Mister H, Mister J, Mister R, Nardo, Various
- Lynn Cohen – Miss I, Various
- John Cothran – Mister N, Mister L, Various
- Allan Trautman – Mister C (voice), Mister K, Various
- Gregg Berger – Mister Z, Mister T, Mister V, Various
- Don Boevingloh – Monty Swell, Various
- Cheryl Brown – Various
- Jane Deeken – Miss O, Various
- Pam Dunn – Various
- John Erickson – Mister C, Various
- David Herzog – Mister T (sometimes), Various
- Bert Hinchman – Various
- Bob Kramer – Mister F, Various
- Nancy Swett – Miss A, Various
- Genevieve Bierman – Miss U, Various (voice)
- Sally Eaton – Various (voice)
- Shelley Heeley – Various (voice)
- Joneal Joplin – Mister S, Mister G, Various (voice)
- Barbara Marentette – Miss A (sometimes), Various (voice)
- Nancy Margulies – Miss U (sometimes), Miss E (voice), Miss A (sometimes)
- Thomas K. McDonough – Sam Gump, Various (voice)
- Bob Miller – Mister B, Mister D, Various (voice)
- James Scott – Mister P, Various (voice)
- Willy Shaw – Mister Q, Various (voice)
- Gail Simmons – Various (voice)
- Simon O'Connor – Mister X, Various (voice)
- Ken Monroe – Mister C (sometimes), Various (voice)
- Dick Teneau – Mister Y (sometimes), Various (voice)
- Gayle Waxman – Various (voice)

=== Revised program (1996) ===
==== Creative Team ====
- Irv Dweir – director, Music and Lyrics
- Joe René and Jacquelyn Reinach – Music and Lyrics
- Lynell Johnson – Lyrics
- Margaret C. Ianniello and Jennifer LaBrie – Graphic Design
- Meg Ross – illustrations
- Thomas Sperling – illustrations
- Lane Yerkes – illustrations
- Barbara Yeagle – illustrations
- Dean Yeagle – illustrations
- Darcy Bell-Myers – illustrations
- Pattie Silver – illustrations

==== Voices ====
- Yvonne Lewis – Ms. A
- Lenny Roberts – Mr. B/Mr. M/Mr. N
- Ron Marshall – Mr. C/Cockatoo/Giraffe
- Angel Elon – Mr. D (original)
- Bert Dovo – Mr. D
- Doris Eugenio – Ms. E
- Michelle Lewis – Ms. F (original)
- Jackie Presti – Ms. F
- Darryl Tookes – Mr. G
- Al Dana – Mr. H
- Paul Evans – Mr. I
- Holli Ross – Ms. J
- Damaris Carbaugh – Ms. K/Ms. S (original)
- Myriam Valle – Ms. L
- Shawn Elliott – Mr. O
- Florence M. Warner – Ms. P
- Paul Rolnick – Mr. Q
- Marlon Saunders – Mr. R/Mr. Z
- Emily Bindiger – Ms. S/Ms. Y
- Ellen Woloshin – Ms. T
- Annette Sanders – Ms. U/Caterpillar/Horse
- Vivian C. Cherry – Ms. V
- Robin Small – Ms. W
- Marty Nelson – Mr. X

==== Strategy Tapes ====
- Annette Sanders – Ms. W
- Lenny Roberts – Mr. N/Mr. R
- Marlon Saunders – Mr. M
- Michelle Lewis – Ms. F/Ms. T
- Kathleen M. Fischer – Ms. P
- Stew Merritt – Mr. R (in "Catch a Rime")
- Paul Evans – Mr. I
- Katreese Barnes – Ms. A
- Doris Eugenio – Ms. S
- Al Dana – Mr. H
- Paul Rolnick – Mr. C
- Holli Ross – Ms. U
- Georgia Jones – Ms. E
- Bert Dovo – Mr. O
- Emily Bindiger – Ms. Y

== In popular media ==
=== Literature ===
- The May 30, 1970 issue of Billboard magazine has an article about the acquisition of American Artist Corp. by NDE.
- The March 29, 1971 issue of Time magazine has an article about NDE and the Letter People.
- The May 12, 1972 issue of Life magazine has a section about the Letter People called "The Huggables".

=== Films ===
- In the 1974 film It's Alive, the "Huggables" are shown when Frank, the main character, visits the school.
- A 2025 documentary titled Everything I Need to Know I Learned from The Letter People, directed by Jason Paul Collum, covered the history of the Letter People along with its creator, Elayne Reiss-Weimann, and publisher, Dr. Bernard Kauderer.

== See also ==
- Hooked on Phonics
- Sesame Street
- Little People (toys)
