= Miss E =

Miss E may refer to:

- A character in The Letter People, American literary program
- Miss E... So Addictive, 2001 hip-hop album by Missy Elliott
