= Claustrophobia (2003 film) =

- Promotional artwork
- Directed by: Mark Tapio Kines
- Written by: Mark Tapio Kines
- Produced by: Mark Tapio Kines; Julia Stemock
- Starring: Melanie Lynskey; Sheeri Rappaport; Mary Lynn Rajskub; Will Collyer; Judith O'Dea
- Cinematography: Bevan Crothers
- Edited by: Marc Wade
- Music by: Christopher Farrell
- Distributed by: Lions Gate Entertainment
- Release date: June 18, 2003
- Running time: 79 minutes
- Country: United States
- Language: English

Claustrophobia (retitled Serial Slayer for home video release) is a 2003 American horror-thriller film. Written and directed by Mark Tapio Kines, it stars Melanie Lynskey, Sheeri Rappaport, Mary Lynn Rajskub, Will Collyer, and Judith O'Dea. The film was shot entirely in daylight, an unusual departure for the horror genre. It was released to DVD by Lionsgate on December 14, 2004.

== Plot ==
In a quiet neighborhood just outside Oakland, California, the locals are held hostage by fear when a serial killer armed with a crossbow begins to stalk and kill residents from their rooftops.

== Cast ==
- Melanie Lynskey as Lauren
- Sheeri Rappaport as Gina
- Mary Lynn Rajskub as Grace
- Will Collyer as Man in Black
- Judith O'Dea as Alena Gray

== Production ==
=== Casting ===
Owing to its single location and small budget, Claustrophobia has just three main speaking roles. Having previously worked together on his debut feature, Foreign Correspondents, Kines invited Melanie Lynskey to star in the film. The search then began for the two remaining leads, with Sheeri Rappaport and Mary Lynn Rajskub being brought on board soon thereafter. Judith O'Dea, star of the 1968 horror film Night of the Living Dead, was subsequently cast in a small role.

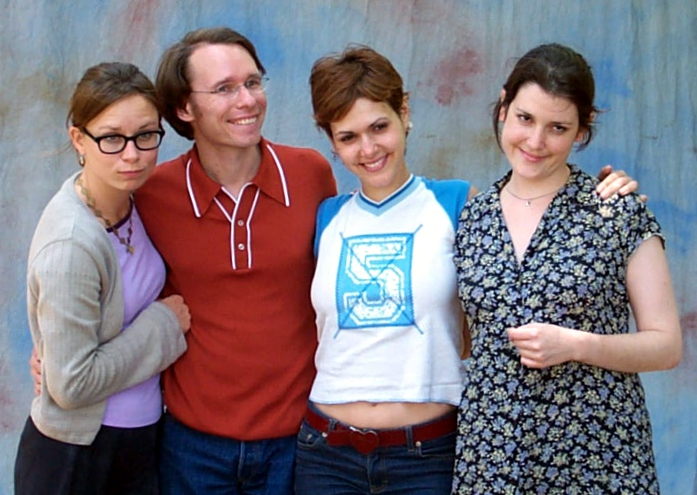
Mary Lynn Rajskub, Mark Tapio Kines, Sheeri Rappaport and Melanie Lynskey on the set of Claustrophobia.

=== Filming ===
Following a brief rehearsal period with the main three actresses, principal photography commenced on June 3, 2002, and wrapped just nine days later. Most of the film was shot inside the Los Angeles home of a former classmate of Kines.

== Post-production ==
It was determined during the editing process that the film was going to be several minutes shorter than originally planned. Kines then wrote a prologue and epilogue to the story—casting Judith O'Dea for the prologue—and shot an additional day-and-a-half of footage at the end of 2002.

Christopher Farrell, who previously scored Foreign Correspondents, provided the film's music. The opening titles were created by William Lebeda, whose work includes The Village and Drag Me to Hell. Claustrophobia was fully completed on May 31, 2003, 364 days after the start of shooting.

== Release and reception ==
Following its premiere in Los Angeles on June 18, 2003, Claustrophobia was released to home video in the United States and Canada—under its new title of Serial Slayer—on December 14, 2004. Speaking of Lionsgate's decision to retitle the film, Kines admitted, "I'm very frustrated. It was a totally lame and insulting decision on [their] part".

Dread Central called film "a complete and utter waste of time, money (both yours if you rent it and whatever small amount the filmmakers spent on making it), and crossbow bolts, which I'm sure could've been put to better use hunting innocent woodland creatures or something". In a more positive appraisal, Fangoria's Michael Gingold commended the film for doing "something different and, given current horror trends, risky: generating fear from a story that takes place entirely during a sunny day". He noted that "Kines and the actresses nicely sketch the trio's contrasting and conflicting personalities before they realize that their lives are in jeopardy, and then build palpable tension as they try to figure a way out of their predicament", adding that the film gave a realistic depiction of women under pressure: "This [feels like] what ordinary people might do if a maniac was [really] stomping around on their roof".
