= October Moon =

2005 film directed by Jason Paul Collum

- 2005 poster
- Directed by: Jason Paul Collum
- Written by: Jason Paul Collum
- Produced by: Jason Paul Collum
- Starring: Judith O'Dea; Brinke Stevens; Sean Michael Lambrecht; Jeff Dylan Graham; Jerod Howard
- Cinematography: Red Clark II
- Edited by: Red Clark II; Dennis Petersen
- Music by: Red Clark II; Sean Michael Lambrecht; Jamey Sewell
- Distributed by: Tempe Entertainment
- Release date: September 29, 2005
- Running time: 112 minutes
- Country: United States
- Language: English
- Budget: $13,000

October Moon is a 2005 independent horror film directed by Jason Paul Collum and starring Judith O'Dea, Brinke Stevens, Sean Michael Lambrecht, Jeff Dylan Graham, Tina Ona Paukstelis, Darcey Vanderhoef and Jerod Howard.

== Plot ==
October is an LGBTQ+ horror film. The plot concerns a male homosexual relationship. The story for the film is based around how a straight man becomes obsessed with his gay boss. He finds himself isolated from his fiancée and his family as his obsession grows, eventually leading him into a violent rage.

== Production ==
After a limited theatrical run beginning September 29, 2005, the movie was distributed on DVD by Tempe Entertainment on Valentine's Day, February 14, 2006. The DVD release was an immediate success for the company, and remained their #1 Best Selling Title in 2006, 2008, 2009 and 2010. October Moon premiered on On Demand in March 2008. It was jointly produced by B+Boy Productions, LLC and Tempe Entertainment. October Moon and its sequel were released as a double-feature on DVD and Blu-ray in September 2021 through MakeFlix for the original film's 15th Anniversary. Both discs contained the cast/crew reunion documentary Poison Pumpkins (directed by Red Clarke II), a new photo gallery, and the 2005 making-of documentary Well Isn't that Queer?.

== Cast ==
- Judith O'Dea as Mrs. Hamilton, Elliot's Mom
- Brinke Stevens as Nancy
- Sean Michael Lambrecht as Corin Buckman
- Jeff Dylan Graham as Jake
- Jerod Howard as Elliot
- Tina Ona Paukstelis as Marti
- Darcey Vanderhoef as Maggie
- Michael Lecce as Johnny
- Chad J. Morrell as Sean / Chantal
- Joel Duffrin as Josie Lynn
- John Grzegorczyk as Detective / Man In Hat
- Ashley J. Anderson as Farmer Red
- Ariauna Albright as Operator (voice)
- James Hauser as Redneck #1
- Jeffrey Wayne Stevens as Jim, In Maintenance

== Sequels ==
The sequel October Moon 2: November Son premiered in a limited theatrical run on July 10, 2008. The entire original cast returned, plus new cast members Debbie Rochon, Robyn Griggs and recording artist Sacha Sacket. The story followed a new mysterious young gay man (Sacket) who seems to bring danger into the lives of the surviving characters from the original film. October Moon 2 was released to DVD on April 14, 2009, by Ariztical Entertainment under the title November Son. Financial disputes between Ariztical and production company B+Boy Productions, LLC. returned the rights to B+Boy, who licensed the title to Tempe Entertainment for re-release on February 15, 2011, under its original title October Moon 2: November Son with original artwork by Paul Girard.

A third film in the trilogy was planned, but as of 2025 had still not been officially announced. However, in an October 2025 live podcast on MakeFlix, Collum revealed he had begun work on the script and had contacted many of the original cast members about reprising their roles.
