= Vampire Zombies... from Space! =

2024 comedy horror film

Vampire Zombies... from Space! is a 2024 Canadian independent comedy film that was written by Jakob Skrzypa, Alex Forman, and Mike Stasko, the latter of whom directed the film. Based on the original concept and story by Jakob Skrzypa and Alex Forman.

The film is a parody of 1950s horror and sci-fi B-movies which blends satire, crude humour, and slapstick with practical effects, miniatures and classic horror tropes. The film centres around an ensemble cast of comedically cliché characters trying to defend a small American town from Dracula, and his army of vampire zombies.

The film features appearances by actors including Judith O'Dea, Lloyd Kaufman, Simon Reynolds and puppeteer David Liebe Hart.

== Cast ==
- Andrew Bee as Chief Ed Clarke
- Rashaun Baldeo as Officer James Wallace
- Jessica Antovski as Mary MacDowell
- Oliver Georgiou as Wayne
- Craig Gloster as Dracula
- Robert Kemeny as Dylan
- Erik Helle as Roy MacDowell
- Simon Reynolds as Col. Harlan Talbit
- Judith O'Dea as Vampira
- David Liebe Hart as Nosferatu
- Martin Ouellette as Coppola's Dracula
- Lloyd Kaufman as Public Masturbator
- Mark Lefebvre as Mayor John Douglas
- Bridget Opfer as Jackie Douglas
- Jakob Skrzypa as Hankey
- Alex Forman as Elmo
- Tyler Colley as Dink
- Curtis Coleman as Officer Chuck
- Anthony Bonnano as Officer Daniels
- Catherine Valle-Taylor as Bernice MacDowell
- Nick Shields as Dr. Spice
- Gavin Michael Booth as Vampire Guard
- Ed Hooft as Raht Gumms
- Bob Mero as Ed's Wood & Hardware Store Clerk
- Jim Walls as Commander Nikki
- Ron McDermott as Commander Clipper
- Cheri Scratch as Phyllis
- Carl Idzinski as Officer Durward
- Charlotte Bondy as Susan MacDowell
- Shane Nelson as Charlie
- Aidan Coutts as Pete
- Deb Laing as Mrs. Alfonzo
- Andrew Barber (voice) as Old-Timey Radio Announcer
- Michael C. Gwynne (voice) as K-TIT Radio Announcer

== Production ==
Vampire Zombies... from Space! was first conceived in 2010 by Jakob Skrzypa, who wrote and began to shoot an early version of the film while he was a high school student at Cardinal Carter Catholic Secondary School.

Skrzypa, a fan of Mel Brooks, was inspired to write the script after seeing Ed Wood's Plan 9 from Outer Space, and decided to create a parody of b-horror films. Only a few scenes remain from the 2010 version, shot on Mini-DV tapes, because most of the footage was accidentally deleted by the film's cameraman. The original script was also considered lost.

In 2017, Skrzypa found a hard copy of the 2010 script, which he brought to his writing partner Alex Forman to review. The two re-wrote the script throughout 2017 – 2018. Skrzypa and Forman's new version retained much of the 2010 source material, while drawing inspiration from South Park, Monty Python, the films of Robert Rodriguez, The Blob, and Forbidden Planet.

The 2018 script was brought to University of Windsor professor Mike Stasko, who joined the project as director and producer. Stasko co-wrote the final draft with Skrzypa and Forman, and the plan was to shoot the film summer 2020. This plan was interrupted by the COVID-19 pandemic.

=== Filming ===
The film was shot primarily in Windsor, Ontario, and Essex, Ontario, Canada in the summer of 2022. Stasko directed, Skrzypa and Forman produced alongside Stasko, Ted Bezaire, and Gerry Lattmann of The Dot Film co. Ken Amlin served as director of photography, with production design by Greg Maxwell, costumes by Emily Eansor, make-up by Stephanie Johnston, hair by Angela Bell, and special effects by Mitchell Branget and Sebastien Gaspar-Woods. Tyler Colley acted as picture car supervisor, miniatures were made by Aaron Fauteux and Brian Krabbenbos.

The production relied heavily on local actors and community support, with some scenes requiring over 100 extras, and 15–20 period correct vehicles. Large portions of the finished film were shot in 2023 as second unit directed by Skrzypa.

Filming locations in the Windsor-Essex region include the Low-Martin mansion. The historic Essex Railway Station and The Canadian Transportation Museum & Heritage Village, where the Jack Miner House, and the village jail were used.

=== Post-production ===
The film was edited by Skrzypa and Stasko. The film incorporates homages to earlier works that inspired its creators. It features and modifies footage from the public domain works Night of the Living Dead, The Brain That Wouldn't Die, Wings, White Zombie, and War of the Colossal Beast, alongside various pieces of stock and archival footage.

Skrzypa and Forman provided all voices for background and crowd scenes, often simply saying the words "chatter", "whisper" and "mutter" on repeat. The sound design also includes audio elements sourced from Skrzypa and Forman's earlier works (largely from sketches they made with Luke Mitchell under the Fun Uncle banner). Additionally the mix features sound effects from Star Wars, Spaceballs, and Monty Python's The Meaning of Life.

The film's final sound mix was done at Toronto's Image & Sound. Suede Productions provided digital VFX, colour grade, and final output. The film's trailer was conceived, written and cut by Jakob Skrzypa.

== Release ==
The film had its world premiere on October 4, 2024, at the Eerie Horror Festival, and remained on the festival circuit through November 2025. The festival run included: a sold-out 1,500 person screening at the Windsor International Film Festival, Mexico's Mórbido Fest, Belgium's Brussels International Fantastic Film Festival, Brazil's Fantaspoa, Calgary Underground Film Festival, Toronto's Canadian Film Festival, San Francisco Independent Film Festival, The New York City Horror Festival, Argentina's Buenos Aires Rojo Sangre, The Moscow International Film Festival, and the South African Horrorfest, where it was awarded best film by guest juror Gala Avary, producer and co-host of Quentin Tarantino and Roger Avary's Video Archives Podcast.
