= Little Witches =

- Theatrical release poster
- Directed by: Jane Simpson
- Written by: Brian DiMuccio; Dino Vindeni
- Produced by: Donald P. Borchers
- Starring: Mimi Rose; Sheeri Rappaport
- Cinematography: Ron Turowski
- Edited by: Kristina Trirogoff
- Music by: Nicolás Rivera
- Production companies: Le Monde Entertainment; Planet Productions
- Distributed by: Two Moon Releasing (United States); Aliance Atlantis (Canada)
- Release date: December 23, 1996
- Running time: 90 minutes
- Countries: United States; Canada
- Language: English

Little Witches is a 1996 Canadian-American horror film directed by Jane Simpson and written by Brian DiMuccio and Dino Vindeni. It has a similar plot to The Craft and released in the same year, though Little Witches had a much smaller budget.

== Plot ==
Faith Ferguson (Mimi Rose) is a relatively shy but intelligent teenager who is heartbroken when her mother informs her that she must spend Easter break at her Catholic girls' school as opposed to coming home. She's roomed with the rebellious Jamie (Sheeri Rappaport), who initially scandalizes Faith with her wild antics. Despite her initial misgivings, Faith finds herself bonding slightly with Jamie and the four other teen misfits that had to remain behind - Erica, Gina, Nicole, and Kelsey. The group is soon intrigued when construction work on the school's church uncovers a Satanic temple containing the mummified remains of several schoolgirls believed to have gone missing almost a hundred years ago.

The girls venture into the temple one night while everyone is asleep and they discover an ancient book written in Latin. Faith is fluent in Latin and translates the book, which outlines a spell that will summon a demon from the pits of hell. Jamie and some of the other girls are eager to practice the spell, but Faith is reticent due to the spell requiring a virgin sacrifice - especially after learning that the schoolgirls were murdered by a guardian devoted to keeping the spell from being cast. This reluctance, along with her interactions with a handsome construction worker named Daniel (Tommy Stork), helps alienate her from Jamie, who was somewhat attracted to him. Things grow more tense when the teens return to the hidden room and discover that there is still a guardian around, as the room was covered in graffiti that warned them that summoning the demon would lead to their deaths. Because Faith has refused to help translate the rest of the book, Jamie decides to play a cruel trick on her by inviting Daniel to their room and making it appear as if he was trying to rape her.

The girls' young schoolteacher, Sister Sherilyn (Jennifer Rubin), provides Faith with some guidance and has her bring meals to Mother Clodah (Zelda Rubinstein), a strange nun bearing a distinctive birthmark on her face. This ends up being to Faith's benefit, as she manages to avoid falling under one of Jamie's spells by praying with Mother Clodah. Unfortunately the encounter also ends with Mother Clodah's death due to Jamie poisoning her meal, believing Mother Clodah to be the guardian. Jamie, who has taught herself to read Latin due to Faith's refusal to translate, proceeds with the spell as planned. The movie implies that the teens will use Faith as a sacrifice due to her virginal nature, but Jamie ends up using Daniel instead after she learns that he is also a virgin. Horrified that they are moving forward with the spell, Faith receives help from Sister Sherilyn, who reveals that she is the guardian. They manage to stop the ceremony in time to save Daniel, but at the cost of the lives of Jamie and all of the other girls involved with the spell.

== Cast ==
- Mimi Rose (credited as Mimi Reichmeister) as Faith Ferguson
- Sheeri Rappaport as Jamie
- Jennifer Rubin as Sister Sherilyn
- Jack Nance as Father Michael
- Zelda Rubinstein as Mother Clodah
- Eric Pierpoint as Sheriff Gordon
- Clea DuVall as Kelsey (DuVall's film debut)
- Tommy Stork as Daniel

== Reception ==
Reception for Little Witches was largely negative, with a Rovi reviewer panning the film. The Chicago Sun-Times commented that the film was full of cliches, while The Kansas City Star named it one of the "worst videos of 1996". JoBlo praised the acting for Rappaport while panning the film overall.

== See also ==
- List of films about witchcraft
