= Danny McCray =

American football player (born 1988)

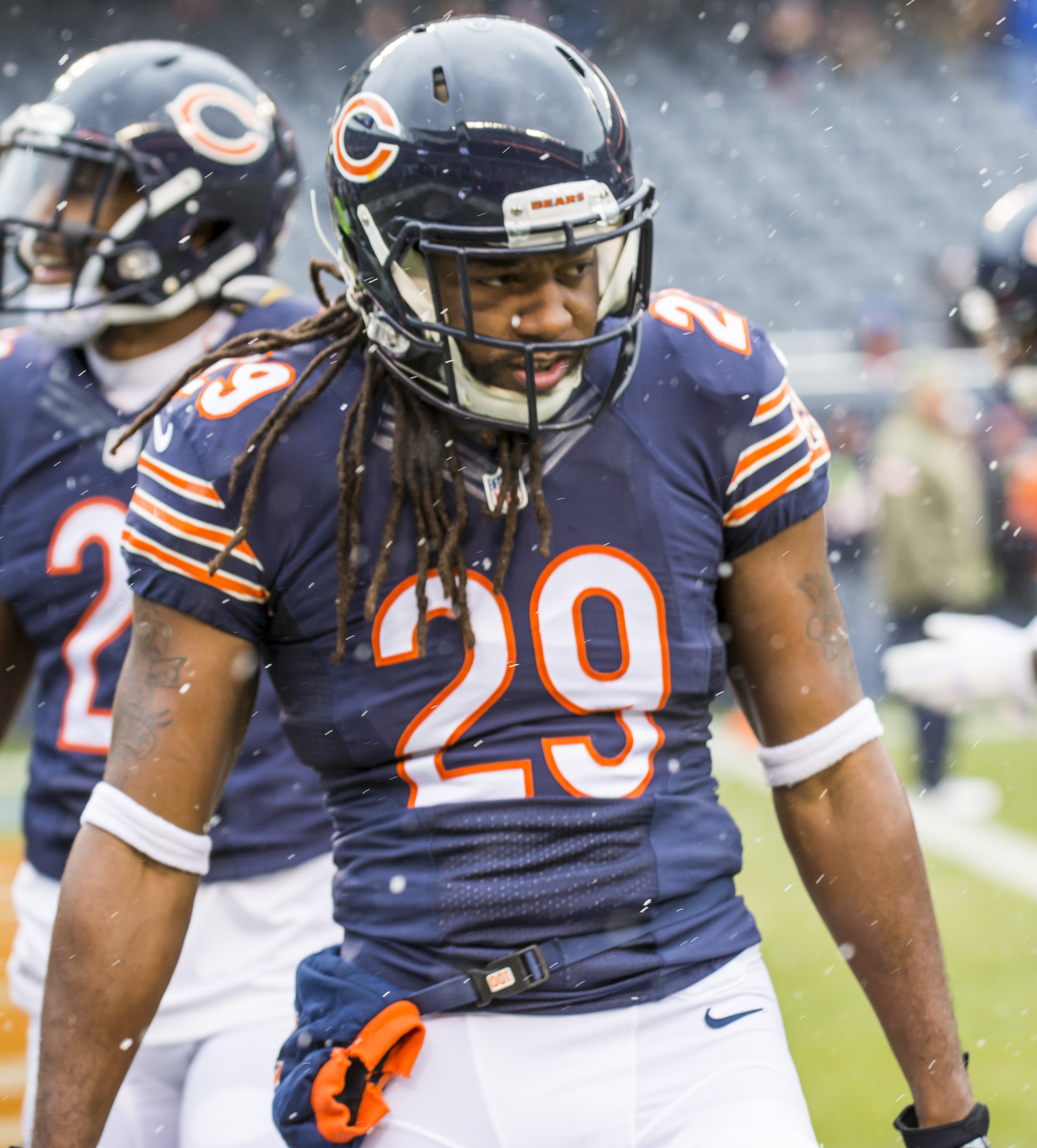
- McCray with the Chicago Bears in 2014

No. 29, 40
- Position: Safety

Personal information
- Born: March 10, 1988 (age 38); Houston, Texas, U.S.
- Listed height: 6 ft 1 in (1.85 m)
- Listed weight: 215 lb (98 kg)

Career information
- High school: Westfield (Houston)
- College: LSU
- NFL draft: 2010: undrafted

Career history
- Dallas Cowboys (2010–2013); Chicago Bears (2014); Dallas Cowboys (2015)

Awards and highlights
- BCS national champion (2007)

Career NFL statistics
- Total tackles: 146
- Sacks: 1
- Forced fumbles: 1
- Fumble recoveries: 1
- Interceptions: 2
- Stats at Pro Football Reference

Danny DeWayne McCray (born March 10, 1988) is an American former professional football player who was a safety and special teamer in the National Football League (NFL). He was signed by the Dallas Cowboys as an undrafted free agent in 2010. He played college football for the LSU Tigers. He also played for the Chicago Bears. In 2021, he competed as a contestant on season 41 of Survivor, where he placed sixth overall. He also competed on the first season of The Challenge: USA, and later on The Challenge: World Championship.

== Early life ==
McCray attended Westfield High School and in 2004 helped the football team to a second-place finish at the Class 5A state championship. He earned first-team all-district honors as a senior in 2005.

He went on to play at Louisiana State University (LSU) contributing mostly in special teams and as a backup both at safety and linebacker. For his career, he played in 52 games with 13 starts and recorded 196 tackles, including seven tackles for losses and three sacks.

== Professional career ==
Pre-draft measurables
Height	Weight	40-yard dash	10-yard split	20-yard split	20-yard shuttle	Three-cone drill	Vertical jump	Broad jump	Bench press
6 ft 0 3/4 in (1.85 m)	214 lb (97 kg)	4.45 s	1.62 s	2.63 s	4.36 s	6.70 s	34.0 in (0.86 m)	9 ft 9 in (2.97 m)	23 reps
All values from Pro Day

=== Dallas Cowboys (first stint) ===
McCray was signed by the Dallas Cowboys in 2010 as an undrafted free agent, based on the recommendation of special teams coach Joe DeCamillis. The team assigned him uniform #40, previously worn by special teams star Bill Bates. As a rookie, he had 28 special teams tackles, the third-most in team history since 1988 and the most by any Cowboys player since Jim Schwantz's team-record 32 in 1996.

The next year, he led the team again in special teams tackles (19), becoming the first Cowboys player to do it consecutively since Bates did it in 1989–1990. He also emerged as the unit leader, becoming a team captain by his third year.

After two seasons of playing in defensive packages as a hybrid linebacker and safety, in 2012 he got his first career start at strong safety against the Chicago Bears, replacing Barry Church who suffered a season-ending Achilles tendon injury. Although he started ten games and finished second on the team in tackles (87), as the season wore on, he struggled in pass coverage and his special teams play suffered dropping to second in tackles (18), eventually losing his starting position and playing time in the last two games of the season.

In 2013, after the Cowboys improved their depth at safety, he accepted a reduced salary to remain with the team and avoid being waived. McCray didn’t see as much time on the defense as he did in the previous year, with the intention of focusing on special teams. New special teams coordinator Rich Bisaccia changed his role, which affected his tackle production, finishing sixth on the team with eight.

=== Chicago Bears ===
On March 18, 2014, McCray signed a one-year contract with the Chicago Bears, reuniting with special teams assistant Joe DeCamillis. He ranked fourth on the team with ten special teams tackles and his best game came against the New York Jets, registering ten tackles on defense.

=== Dallas Cowboys (second stint) ===
On May 14, 2015, McCray was re-signed by the Cowboys. In the second game against the Philadelphia Eagles, he blocked a punt that was returned for a touchdown. He posted four special teams tackles but wasn't retained after the season.

== NFL career statistics ==
Legend
**Bold**	Career high

Year	Team	Games		Tackles					Interceptions					Fumbles			
Year	Team	GP	GS	Cmb	Solo	Ast	Sck	TFL	Int	Yds	TD	Lng	PD	FF	FR	Yds	TD
2010	DAL	**16**	0	22	16	6	0.0	0	**1**	0	0	0	1	0	0	0	0
2011	DAL	14	0	18	15	3	**1.0**	**1**	0	0	0	0	0	**1**	0	0	0
2012	DAL	15	**10**	**71**	**50**	**21**	0.0	**1**	**1**	0	0	0	**2**	0	0	0	0
2013	DAL	15	0	8	7	1	0.0	0	0	0	0	0	0	0	0	0	0
2014	CHI	15	0	24	17	7	0.0	0	0	0	0	0	0	0	**1**	0	0
2015	DAL	**16**	0	3	2	1	0.0	0	0	0	0	0	0	0	0	0	0
		91	10	146	107	39	1.0	2	2	0	0	0	3	1	1	0	0

== Survivor ==
In 2020, McCray was cast on the 41st season of the American reality competition series Survivor. Due to the COVID-19 pandemic, production of the season was delayed until 2021. When production resumed, McCray and 17 other contestants were flown to Fiji to participate in season 41 of the show.

Initially, McCray was placed on the Luvu tribe. After the merge, he formed an alliance with fellow Luvu alum Deshawn Radden, former Ua tribe member Shan Smith, and former Yase tribe member Liana Wallace. The alliance was tight at first, but on Day 19, McCray and Radden decided to vote Smith out of the game. The next day, McCray began reflecting on the auto-accident death of his father exactly 25 years earlier. According to McCray, his time in Fiji being on Survivor is what enabled him to finally let go of all the negativity he had suffered as a result of his father's death.

On Day 21, the three remaining in McCray's alliance wanted to target Ricard Foyé, but the rest of the tribe decided to eliminate Wallace. After Foyé won immunity on Day 23, McCray and Radden suddenly became the targets. That night, the first vote ended in a tie between the two. Upon the second vote, McCray was unanimously voted out, making him the sixth member of the jury.

At the final Tribal Council on Day 26, McCray voted for Radden to win the game, but he was the only juror to do so, as Erika Casupanan earned the other seven jury votes to win Sole Survivor.

== The Challenge ==
In 2022, McCray competed on the CBS series The Challenge: USA where he finished as the male winner of the season, taking home $245,500. As a result of winning, McCray also competed on the series The Challenge: World Championship on Paramount+, where he was paired with The Challenge veteran, Tori Deal, and placed second.

== Filmography ==
=== Television ===
Year	Title	Role	Notes
2021	Survivor 41	Contestant	13th eliminated
2022	The Challenge: USA	Contestant (season 1)	Winner
2023	The Challenge: World Championship	Contestant with Tori Deal	Runner-up

Preceded by First	Winner of The Challenge: USA; The Challenge: USA season 1	Succeeded by Chris Underwood; Desi Williams
