= Seeing Other People (film) =

2004 film by Wallace Wolodarsky

- Directed by: Wallace Wolodarsky
- Written by: Maya Forbes; Wallace Wolodarsky
- Produced by: Gavin Polone
- Starring: Jay Mohr; Julianne Nicholson; Josh Charles; Andy Richter; Lauren Graham; Bryan Cranston; Matthew Davis; Jill Ritchie
- Cinematography: Mark Doering-Powell
- Edited by: Stewart Schill
- Music by: Alan Elliott
- Distributed by: Shaw Organisation; Lantern Lane Entertainment
- Release date: May 7, 2004
- Running time: 90 minutes
- Country: United States
- Language: English
- Box office: $87,713 (USA)

Seeing Other People is a 2004 American comedy film directed by Wallace Wolodarsky, who co-wrote the screenplay with Maya Forbes. The film stars Jay Mohr and Julianne Nicholson as a couple who decide to see other people two months before their wedding.

== Plot ==
Ed and Alice are in love, but not passionate, ripping-clothes-off in love. They do laundry on Saturday, and do small things that make each other happy. At their engagement party, Alice sees a friend hook up with a server and comes to the conclusion that she would like to try more sexual partners before she settles down for the rest of her life.

Ed, initially resistant to the idea of seeing other people, decides to go along with it. Alice takes the lead by making out with a friend's contractor, Donald. When she tells Ed, he is shocked, but incredibly turned on. They have some of the best sex they have had in years. Ed attempts to have sex with an actress at work, but cannot perform. Alice finally psyches herself up to having sex with Donald at his house. She leaves satisfied but hurriedly, while Donald clearly has fallen for her.

That night, Alice tells Ed that she had sex with Donald. Ed never thought she would actually go that far. Upset, he leaves. He tries to hook up with different girls at a house party with his friend Carl, but none of his attempts goes well. He returns home to find Alice trying to call off the whole deal. Ed tells her that she is right and that he overreacted, but he says that they should continue the deal until she is completely satisfied so they have no regrets.

The next day, Ed succeeds in having sex with the actress. When he tells Alice, he expects her to be jealous, but instead she is turned on. They again have sex and believe things to be going well. Having sex outside their relationship is improving their sex life. Carl observes a woman (Penelope) in a stereo store who is being pressured by an overzealous sales clerk. He helps install a new system for Penelope and her son Jake. Jake is angry at his mother because of her recent divorce.

Ed has a date at a restaurant and turns out to be seated next to Alice and Donald; it is uncomfortable. Later, waiting for their cars, Ed and Alice talk. Ed is upset that Alice is seeing Donald, and she is upset that Ed has slept with so many women. Ed says they are supposed to be sleeping with other people, but she is just sleeping with one, as if it is a relationship. She says it is hard to sleep with other people with him living in the house. Ed agrees to move out.

Alice is growing tired of Donald because he is needy. Ed is getting tired of meaningless sex. He eventually starts dating a woman named Sandy and grows to like her more and more.

Breaking it off with Donald after finding out that he dates other women, Alice tries to get back with Ed. Ed, however, has feelings for Sandy at this point, but she is not quite what she seems. After a failed three-way in which the third girl straps on a dildo, Sandy suggests they try crack cocaine.

In a self-destructive impulse, Alice tries to sleep with her sister's husband Peter. Her sister is having an affair with Ed's friend Lou. She shows up and all is revealed. Alice misses how comfortable and happy she used to be.

Ed ends up stranded when Sandy runs off with his car after stealing a bag of crack. He walks all night and arrives at Alice's house just as everyone else is leaving. He pulls out a book of stamps that he bought weeks ago because he knew it to be one of the small things she loves. They sit side by side, not entirely sure where they go from here.

== Main cast ==
- Jay Mohr as Ed
- Julianne Nicholson as Alice
- Lauren Graham as Claire
- Bryan Cranston as Peter
- Josh Charles as Lou
- Andy Richter as Carl
- Helen Slater as Penelope
- Alex Borstein as Tracy
- Nicole Marie Lenz as Miranda
- Mimi Rogers as Elise
- Matthew Davis as Donald
- Jonathan Davis as Ricky
- Jill Ritchie as Sandy
- Niki J. Crawford as Venita
- Dylan McLaughlin as Jake
- Lew Schneider as Marty
- Shanna Moakler as Kasey
- Mike Faiola as Tim
- Sheeri Rappaport as Naomi
