= Tom Tichenor =

Thomas Hager Tichenor (February 10, 1923 — November 18, 1992) was an American puppeteer, most noted for creating the original puppets for the Broadway musical Carnival!.

== Early life ==
Tichenor was born in Decatur, Alabama, and initially raised by his Aunt Ruby in Smyrna, Tennessee. His family later moved with Tom to Nashville. At the age of 15, Tichenor staged a marionette production of Puss in Boots at the Nashville Public Library, which began his lifelong association with the library.

Tichenor graduated from Hume-Fogg High School in Nashville in 1940, along with classmate (and class salutatorian) Bettie Page. He joined the US Army in 1943, and at the end of World War II came back to Nashville. There he continued his puppetry work with Nashville Public Library, performing marionette shows and story times. Tichenor also launched a 15-minute children's radio show on WSM called Wormwood Forest, which was sent live to NBC for national broadcast. Tichenor wrote the show, and played several characters. In 1949, Walt Disney (as himself and as Mickey Mouse) and Clarence Nash (as Donald Duck) made special appearances on the show.

== Puppetry and books ==
Tichenor also expanded into television, with puppetry shows on both WSM in Nashville and WKNO in Memphis. In 1959, Tichenor became the first local Bozo the Clown for WSM. 1959 also saw the publication of his first book, Folk Plays for Puppets You Can Make (Abingdon Press, 1959). He would go on to write two other informational books: Tom Tichenor’s Puppets (Abingdon Press, 1971) and Christmas Tree Crafts (J.B. Lippincott Company, 1975.) He also authored three books for children: Smart Bear (Abingdon Press, 1970), Sir Patches and the Dragon (Aurora Publishers, 1971) and Neat-O the Supermarket Mouse (Abingdon, 1981).

== New York ==
At the encouragement of an actor friend, Tichenor traveled to New York City in 1960 to audition his puppets for the upcoming Broadway production of Carnival!. Tichenor auditioned for director Gower Champion, writer Helen Deutsch, and casting director Michael Shurtleff. They found the “provincial simplicity” of Tichenor's work perfect for the show, and hired him. Tichenor was tasked with designing and building the show's central puppets, and also with training actor Jerry Orbach in puppetry. The show was a hit, and Tichenor's puppets appeared on the May 5, 1961 cover of Life magazine along with star Anna Maria Alberghetti.

While in New York, Tichenor got involved with television, appearing with Paul Tripp on WNBC in Birthday House in 1963. Tichenor appeared as Strawtop, a pantomime scarecrow, and also performed many puppet characters. When Birthday House ended in 1967, Tichenor returned home to Nashville.

== Back to Nashville ==
Back in Nashville, Tichenor resumed his relationship with the public library, but still found other outlets for his puppetry. In 1969 his characters appeared on ABC TV’s The Mysterious Magical Miracle Box. In 1974 he served as a puppeteer and designer for The Letter People, a television series originating from KETC in St. Louis. Tichenor continued his library work until his retirement in 1988. He died in 1992 in Murfreesboro, Tennessee and is buried in Nashville National Cemetery.

Tichenor's legacy is carried on by Wishing Chair Productions, the Nashville Public Library's resident puppet troupe.
