= Sheeri Rappaport =

American actress

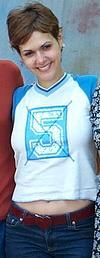
- Sheeri Rappaport on the set of Claustrophobia
- Occupation: Actress
- Years active: 1993–2012

Sheeri Rappaport is an American actress. She is most famous for portraying lab technician Mandy Webster on CSI: Crime Scene Investigation.

Rappaport made her television debut with a guest role on Clarissa Explains It All. She portrayed the Amazon Otere on Xena: Warrior Princess, and also made guest appearances on 7th Heaven, The Drew Carey Show, The District and Strong Medicine. She also appeared in the films Claustrophobia, Seeing Other People, and The United States of Leland.

Apart from CSI, Rappaport also portrayed Officer Mary Franco in seasons 7 and 8 of NYPD Blue. Other roles include a manipulative Catholic schoolgirl in the 1996 teen horror film Little Witches, and as Lois Lane in the Blayne Weaver film, Losing Lois Lane.

== Filmography ==
=== Film ===
| Year | Title | Role | Notes |
|---|---|---|---|
| 1996 | Little Witches | Jamie | |
| 2002 | Parting Gifts | Gina | Short Film |
| 2002 | Speakeasy | Party Mother | |
| 2003 | The United States of Leland | Second Officer | |
| 2003 | Claustrophobia | Gina | |
| 2004 | Larceny | Rhonda | |
| 2004 | Seeing Other People | Naomi | |
| 2004 | Clean | Lola | Short Film |
| 2004 | Losing Lois Lane | Lois Lane | Short Film |
| 2004 | Last Night | Susanna | Short Film |
| 2004 | The Vision | Zoe | Short Film |
| 2011 | 6 Month Rule | Kristi | |

=== Television ===
| Year | Title | Role | Notes |
|---|---|---|---|
| 1993 | Clarissa Explains It All | Piper Henderson | Episode: "Piper Comes to Visit" |
| 1994 | CBS Schoolbreak Special | Liz | Episode: "My Summer as a Girl" |
| 1996 | Beverly Hills, 90210 | Sherry | Episode: "Bleeding Hearts" |
| 1996 | For My Daughter's Honor | Missy Ross | TV Movie |
| 1997 | Two Small Voices | Amy | TV Movie |
| 1998 | 7th Heaven | Connie Gannon | 2 Episodes |
| 1998 | Xena: Warrior Princess | Otere | 2 Episodes |
| 1998 | Malcolm & Eddie | Allison | Episode: "That's What Friends Aren't For" |
| 2000–2001 | NYPD Blue | Officer Mary Franco | 13 Episodes |
| 2000–2012 | CSI: Crime Scene Investigation | Mandy Webster | 38 Episodes |
| 2003 | Boomtown | Janice Edwards | Episode: "Lost Child" |
| 2003 | The District | Lorraine | 2 Episodes |
| 2004 | The Drew Carey Show | Anabelle / Annabelle | 3 Episodes |
| 2005 | Strong Medicine | Melissa Nauls | Episode: "We Wish You a Merry Cryst-Meth" |
