= Jason Paul Collum =

American film maker (born 1973)

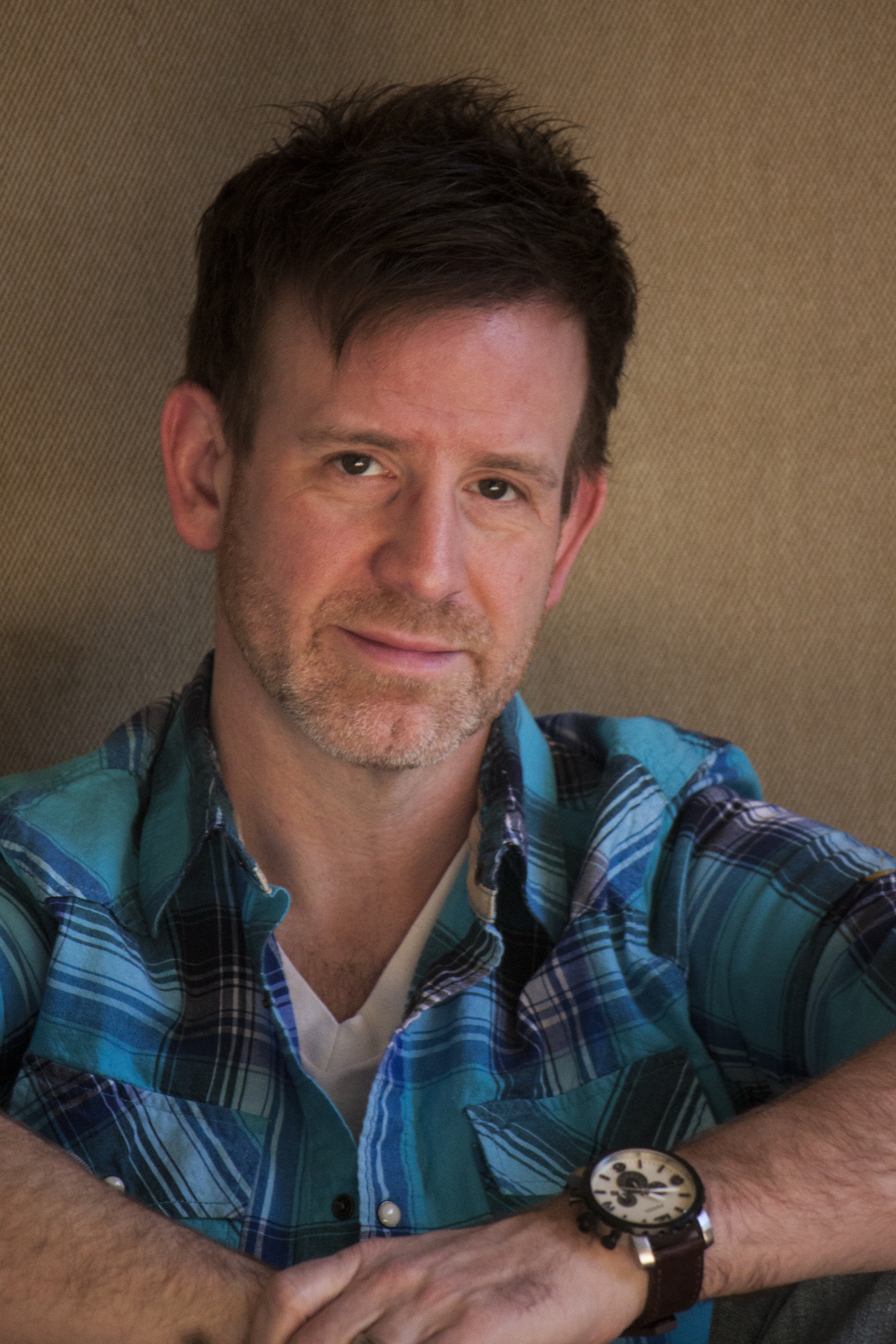
Image (unused) was taken to accompany an article for the April/May 2013 issue of The Advocate.

Jason Paul Collum (July 15, 1973) is an American film maker. Collum has written and directed multiple films in the horror film genre, and has earned a reputation as the “gay horror guy". He has written articles for several horror magazines, and made a documentary on the Slumber Party Massacre franchise by Roger Corman. He has worked on several projects with B-movie filmmakers David DeCoteau and J. R. Bookwalter. Collum is also the author of the books, Assault of the Killer Bs: Interviews With 20 Cult Film Actresses, They Made How Many?! (Mostly) American Horror Franchises of the 20th Century, the children's self-esteem book Heads Up (so you can see the world), and Basements: A Short Tale of Terror.

== Early life and education ==
Collum was born in Brookfield, Wisconsin, and raised in Racine, Wisconsin. Collum claims he was a lonely child growing up and entertained himself by watching TV; at age 12 he began watching horror films and became obsessed with them. When he was a junior in high school, he used a camcorder and made his first short film called Dead Women Don’t Wear Shoes (1990). He graduated from the private Roman Catholic St. Catherine's High School in 1991, and graduated with a major in English from the University of Wisconsin–Parkside in 1996. He earned a post-baccalaureate degree in Early Childhood Education in 2014 from the University of Wisconsin - Milwaukee.

== Career ==
After graduating from college, he moved to California, where he started writing full-length scripts. He developed contacts in the film industry after meeting Brinke Stevens, which led him to being introduced to J. R. Bookwalter and David DeCoteau. He worked with director David DeCoteau on the movies The Brotherhood I and II and Final Stab, and producer/writer J. R. Bookwalter on the film Hell Asylum and the TV show Bad Movie Police. His stay in California was short, as within four years he was offered an editorial position at Femme Fatales and Cinefantastique magazines in Chicago. After the Chicago offices closed he eventually moved back to Wisconsin, where he continued making movies.

Horror allows you to suspend reality. You get to tackle true subjects in otherworldly ways. Underlying psychological themes. I find it to be so much more creative. It’s also just how my brain is wired.

— Jason Paul Collum

His 2005 film October Moon was based on actual events in his life, and was filmed in Racine and Kenosha counties. Every character in the film is based on someone he knew, and the lead character was based on his father, who had come out as gay, despite being married to his mother. The film was developed from several people’s fact-based experiences. Film critic Louis Fowler described the film as "Gaytal Attraction". His movie October Moon and its sequel, October Moon 2: November Son was the first gay-themed horror franchise in history.

In 2010, Collum co-wrote and directed the documentary Sleepless Nights: Revisiting the Slumber Party Massacres, about the Slumber Party Massacre movie trilogy by Roger Corman. Collum talked with directors, actors, and various crew members of the three movies to discuss what it was like filming the scenes that required nudity, sex and violence, and what they thought about working for Corman.

Collum has written for Femme Fatales, Fangoria, Instinct, Exploitation Nation and Cinefantastique magazines, and is author of the books Assault of the Killer Bs: Interviews With 20 Cult Film Actresses, and Basements: A Short Tale of Terror. The April/May 2013 issue of The Advocate listed him as one of their "40 under 40" most intriguing artists to watch.

In 2019, Amazon Prime pulled [two] of Collum's movies from their service with no advance notice, and with no path to re-examine their decision, according to filmmaker Derrick Carey. "These are movies that consistently had many views and to this day get him fan mail, as they are touchstones of the indie horror scene", said Carey.

Released on July 28, 2023, Collum's film guide They Made How Many?! (Mostly) American Horror Franchises of the 20th Century is a culmination of every horror franchise launched from the year 1900 to 1999. However, Collum states on page 2 "I truly tried to include every franchise I could...[but] after two years of research, I am still coming across sequels I never knew existed. So I cannot claim this book to be a complete guide – just as accurate as I know." The 654-page book also includes interviews with over 30 actors and crew of several of the sequels listed. By its third day of release, July 31, 2023, the title had climbed on Amazon's list of book sales from #109,927 up to #40,262. It was the #1 New release in Amazon's Historical Studies section and rose to #8 on its Best-Selling Horror Movies section. The book's cover is created by artist John Konecny and features hand-drawn villainous characters from popular sequels like "Ricky" from Silent Night, Deadly Night 3: Better Watch Out!, Mary Lou Maloney from Hello Mary Lou: Prom Night II, the Driller Killer from Slumber Party Massacre II, Eleanor from Howling IV: The Original Nightmare, Julie Walker from Return of the Living Dead 3, Blade from the Puppet Master franchise, and the lead Ghoulie from Ghoulies III: Ghoulies Go to College. The rest of the cover features a grid with the titles of popular franchises and a roman numeral of their most recent sequel. A second edition, updated with an additional 50 titles and 2 more actor interviews, was released on August 15, 2024.

Based on his own childhood, Collum wrote his first children's book Heads Up (so you can see the world), released purposefully on February 29, 2024. The idea germinated when Collum took a walk along the beach in 2023 and realized that 45 minutes into his journey he had not seen any of it – he'd kept his head down for the entire walk. It was a trait he'd begun in elementary school to avoid eye-contact with school bullies and anyone else he feared might make fun of him. He unintentionally continues this trait to present day simply from habit. The story focuses on the conflicts and fears of childhood and expresses to readers ways to lift their heads and self-confidence up.

== Select filmography ==
Year	Title	Notes	Refs
1990	Dead Women Don't Wear Shoes	Short: Written and directed by Collum	
1995	Mark of the Devil 666: The Moralist	Written and directed by Collum	
1996	5 Dark Souls	Written and directed by Collum	
1998	5 Dark Souls, Part II: Roots of Evil	Written and directed by Collum	
2000	Julia Wept	Written and directed by Collum; The title character is named after his sister Julia	
2003	5 Dark Souls, Part III: Retribution	Written and directed by Collum	
2003	Something to Scream About	Documentary: Written and directed by Collum	
2005	October Moon	Written and directed by Collum	
2005	Well Isn't That Queer?: The Making of October Moon	Short: Documentary written and directed by Collum	
2008	October Moon 2: November Son	Written and directed by Collum	
2010	Sleepless Nights: Revisiting the Slumber Party Massacres	Documentary about The Slumber Party Massacre horror film franchise.	
2011	Shy of Normal: Tales of New Life Experiences	Directed by Collum	
2011	Screaming in High Heels: The Rise & Fall of the Scream Queen Era	Documentary: Written and directed by Collum	
2017	I Collum as I See 'Em: My Camcorder to Digital Career	Short: Biography, directed by Andrew Gibbs	(Note: see IMDb credits)
2017	Safe Inside	Written and directed by Collum	
2019	Inside the Red Room	TV series	
2020	Screaming in High Heels: The Reunion	Documentary: Written and directed by Collum	
2022	Mark of the Devil 777: The Moralist, Part 2	Written and directed by Collum	
2025	Safe Inside 2	Written and directed by Collum	
2025	Everything I Need to Know I Learned from The Letter People	Documentary: Written, produced, and directed by Collum	
