= Bill Yeagle =

American football player and coach (born 1938)

Biographical details
- Born: 1938 (age 87–88)

Playing career
- 1959–1962: Tampa
- 1963–1964: Orlando Broncos
- Positions: Defensive back, tight end

Coaching career (HC unless noted)
- 1968–1978: Wisconsin–Eau Claire (DB)
- 1979–1981: Salisbury State

Head coaching record
- Overall: 18–11–1

Bill Yeagle (born 1938) is an American former football player and coach. He served as the head football coach at Salisbury State College—now known as Salisbury University—in Salisbury, Maryland from 1979 to 1981, compiling a record of 18–11–1. Yeagle played college football at the University of Tampa. He was an assistant football coach at the University of Wisconsin–Eau Claire for 11 years prior to being hired at Salisbury State.
