= The Challenge: USA season 1 =

1st season of the reality television series

The Challenge: USA
- Season 1
- Presented by: T. J. Lavin
- No. of contestants: 28
- Winners: Danny McCray; Sarah Lacina
- Location: Buenos Aires & Patagonia, Argentina
- No. of episodes: 12

Release
- Original network: CBS
- Original release: July 6 – September 22, 2022

Season chronology
- Next → Season 2

The first season of The Challenge: USA premiered on CBS on July 6, 2022. The season featured twenty-eight cast members from Big Brother, Love Island, Survivor, and The Amazing Race competing for a monetary prize.

== Format ==
The Challenge: USA consists of a daily challenge, winner's selection and an elimination round. For the first seven episodes, players compete as male/female pairs which change for each cycle of the game.

- Daily Challenge: Players compete in a main challenge in male/female teams of two. The last-place team is automatically sent to the elimination round. The winners earn $5,000 each for their bank account and the power to select a second team to compete in the elimination against the last-place team.
- Eliminations ("The Arena"): The last-place team from the daily challenge compete in an elimination round against the team selected by the winners of the daily challenge. The losers are eliminated while the winners remain in the game and split all the money from their opponent's bank accounts.

From episode 8, the game changed to an individual format, and elimination rounds were designated to one gender. Players compete in daily challenges individually, where the last-place player of the designated gender is automatically sent to the elimination round to compete against the same-gender player later selected by the winners. The winner remains in the game and receives all the money in their opponent's bank account while the loser is eliminated.

Twists

- Bank Accounts: Each player starts the game with $1,000 in their bank account. To be eligible to compete in the Final Challenge, players must accumulate at least $5,000. They can earn money for their account by winning daily challenges or eliminations.
- The Algorithm: From episode two to episode seven, an algorithm assigns players a new partner of the opposite gender for the next cycle of the game. Players must be assigned a new partner they haven't previously been paired with, and cannot have the same partner twice in a row if they have already partnered with each eligible remaining player. The Algorithm also selects teams for day one of the Final Challenge.

== Contestants ==
Male contestants	Original season	Finish
Danny McCray	Survivor 41	Winner (Note: Cayla, Domenick, Justine and Tyson withdrew from the Final Leg of the Final Challenge. As the only two to reach the finish, Danny and Sarah were declared the winners of the season.)
Domenick Abbate	Survivor: Ghost Island	Runner-up
Tyson Apostol	Survivor: Tocantins	Runner-up
Enzo Palumbo	Big Brother 12	Fourth place (Note: Enzo withdrew from the Final Challenge during Checkpoint #1; Desi was disqualified as a result of being Enzo's partner.)
Ben Driebergen	Survivor: Heroes vs. Healers vs. Hustlers	Fifth place (Note: Ben was medically removed from the competition immediately before the Final Challenge after suffering a shoulder injury.)
David Alexander	Big Brother 21	Episode 10
Leo Temory	The Amazing Race 23	Episode 8
Kyland Young	Big Brother 23	Episode 7
Derek Xiao	Big Brother 23	Episode 6
Melvin "Cinco" Holland Jr.	Love Island 3	Episode 5
Xavier Prather	Big Brother 23	Episode 4
James Wallington	The Amazing Race 32	Episode 3
Cashel Barnett	Love Island 1	Episode 2
Javonny Vega	Love Island 3	Episode 1

Female contestants	Original season	Finish
Sarah Lacina	Survivor: Cagayan	Winner
Cayla Platt	The Amazing Race 33	Runner-up
Justine Ndiba	Love Island 2	Runner-up
Angela Rummans	Big Brother 20	Fourth place (Note: Angela was disqualified from the Final Challenge at the end of Checkpoint #4 after not attempting to complete the checkpoint, in a bid to conserve her energy.)
Desi Williams	Survivor: Heroes vs. Healers vs. Hustlers	Fifth place
Alyssa Lopez	Big Brother 23	Episode 11
Cashay Proudfoot	Love Island 3	Episode 9
Kyra Green	Love Island 1	Episode 7
Shannon St. Clair	Love Island 3	Episode 6
Azah Awasum	Big Brother 23	Episode 5
Shan Smith	Survivor 41	Episode 4
Tasha Fox	Survivor: Cagayan	Episode 3
Tiffany Mitchell	Big Brother 23	Episode 2
Cely Vazquez	Love Island 2	Episode 1

== Gameplay ==
=== Challenge games ===
- Down To Do the Math: Played two teams at a time, teams rappel down the side of a 22-story building, solve a series of math operations assigned to them along the way and answer once they reach the ground. If teams answer incorrectly three times, they must climb the stairs to the top of the building and rappel again. The team with the fastest time wins while the team with the slowest time is automatically sent to the Arena.
  - Winners: Angela & Tyson
- Yeah Buoy: Played two teams at a time, teams must swim to a ladder, climb up and jump onto a spinning buoy. They can then take five letter tiles attached to the buoy at once, return them to shore and place them on a board to form as many words as possible, repeating this process for 20 minutes. The team with the most words formed wins while the team with the fewest words is automatically sent to the Arena.
  - Winners: Justine & Tyson
- Hang On Man: Teams run across a carpark to collect 12 pieces and build a staircase to the top a container. Once built, one team member balances on a narrow plank holding a rod across their back. Like hangman, the other team member takes letter tiles from the container to a puzzle board as their guess to a hidden phrase. After each incorrect guess, they must clip a 10-pound sandbag onto the rod their partner is holding. Teams are eliminated from the challenge if the team member on the plank falls off or drops the rod. The first team to guess their phrase and transport a final sandbag back to their container wins while the first team to drop their rod or fall of the plank is automatically sent to the Arena.
  - Winners: Angela & Kyland
- Falling Off the Knowledge: Played in three heats, teams begin suspended on a ledge off the side of a building. After being asked a question with multiple answers, such as naming zodiac signs, one team at a time must give one of the possible answers. If teams answer incorrectly or with a previously given answer, their ledge opens and drops them 150 feet. The last team standing in each heat advance to the winner's round while the first team to answer incorrectly in each heat must compete in an additional loser's round. The last team standing in the winner's round wins while the first team to answer incorrectly in the loser's round is automatically sent to the Arena.
  - Winners: Alyssa & Kyland
- Barreled Treasure: Teams swim 150 yards from a barge to their buoy with a number code printed on it, memorize the code and swim another 75 yards to a ship. On the ship, they must search among one hundred barrels for two with the same code on the lid, and return the puzzle pieces inside to the barge after finding each barrel. If teams open an incorrect barrel, they must swim back to their buoy before returning to the ship to continue searching. Once they return both sets of puzzle pieces, the first team to solve the puzzle wins while the last team is automatically sent to the Arena.
  - Winners: Cashay & Tyson
- Containment: Played one team at a time. Team members swim and climb a ladder to opposite sides of a shipping container course suspended above water. They must count the amounts of four symbols printed on the first container, cross a net onto a second container then use a rope to swing to a platform at the middle of the course. Once both team members reach the platform, they must take their team's keys, return to shore, and place them in a board to release a card. Teams then multiply the number of each of the symbols they counted by its value listed on the card and add the four totals together to get their final answer. Teams must complete the course again if they answer incorrectly or fall off before reaching the platform. The team with the fastest time wins while the team with the slowest time is automatically sent to the Arena. If multiple teams are unable to complete the challenge, the last-place team is determined by how far they progressed in the course.
  - Winners: David & Desi
- Wreck-Reational Driving: Teams begin in a car with four balls attached to the outside. Throughout the challenge, one team member must drive the car blindfolded, being directed by their partner, and try to pop their opponent's balls while avoiding having their own balls popped. Teams are eliminated from the challenge if all their balls get popped, or are unable to drive any further after wrecking their car. The last team standing wins while the first team eliminated is automatically sent to the Arena.
  - Winners: Cayla & Domenick
- Having A Blast: Played one or two players at a time, players jump from a Zodiac boat into a soap-covered floating runway being pulled by a tugboat. They must then take a key from a station at one end of the runway and plug it into a safe at the other end, repeating this process for four keys. After inserting all four keys, players must return the flag inside the safe back to the station. During the challenge, one or two other contestants can spray water at them, and players are disqualified if they fall off the runway. The male and female player with the fastest time wins while the male player with the slowest time is automatically sent to the Arena.
  - Winners: Angela & Ben
- Collect Four: Each player begins with a six-by-five board. Throughout the challenge, they must search the Estadio Juan Domingo Perón for their colored tokens, and can either place the tokens on their board to try and line up four tokens in a row or flip the tokens over and place them on an opponent’s board to block them. The first male and female players to line up four tokens on their board wins while the first female to have their board completely blocked and be unable to line up four tokens is automatically sent to the Arena.
  - Winners: Danny & Desi
- Code Crossing: Two players at a time begin harnessed at the end of a speeding truck. They must place pegs into slots on the side of the truck and use them to reach the front and pull a cord. Before the challenge, each player could also select six slots to already have a peg placed. There is a three-minute time limit before players time out and players are disqualified if they fall off the truck. If multiple players are unable to complete the challenge, the winning and losing players are determined by distance travelled. The male and female player with the fastest time, or furthest distance, wins while the male player with the shortest distance crossed is automatically sent to the Arena.
  - Winners: Angela & Ben
- Getting Tired: Players swim 500 metres (1,600 feet) across a lake before running to an abandoned military complex. They can then retrieve different items from around the complex and bring them to their station at a drop-off zone one kilometre (0.62 mi) away. Tokens are worth 1 point while blue, yellow, orange, red and pink tires are worth 3, 5, 7, 10 and 20 points respectively. The harder an item is to obtain, the more points it is worth. Players repeat this process for two hours, and may only carry one item at a time. The male and female player with the most points at the end of two hours wins while the female player with the fewest points is automatically sent to the Arena. (Note: Domenick and Tyson both scored 52 points in the "Getting Tired" challenge. As there was no tiebreaker, they were both declared the male winners, splitting the $5,000 for their bank accounts.)
  - Winners: Domenick, Sarah & Tyson

=== Arena games ===
- Knot So Fast: Teams have 20 minutes to create as many knots as they can using a 250-foot rope within a pyramid structure. After those 20 minutes are up, teams switch positions and must untie their opponent's knots. The first team to untie their opponent's knots and place the rope inside their circle wins.
  - Played by: Azah & Kyland vs. Cely & Javonny
- Knowledge Is Powered: Teams pedal stationary bikes connected to a power station to illuminate six lights. After each second light is lit, 12 symbols briefly display on a screen which teams must memorize and replicate on their board. The first team to light up all six lights and correctly replicate all three sets of symbols wins.
  - Played by: Cashel & Tiffany vs. Cayla & James
- Plug and Play: One team member enters a container filled with water to release 14 submerged blocks and pass them to their partner, who stacks the blocks to build a tower. Throughout the elimination, the water slowly drains out of the container and teams are disqualified if the water drops below a marked line. The first team to build their tower wins.
  - Played by: Cashay & Domenick vs. James & Tasha
- Smash In Puzzle Out: Teams break through glass panes enclosed in a narrow tunnel to reach a set of puzzle pieces at the end. They must then retrieve the pieces, one by one, and solve the puzzle. Each pane must also be broken by a specific team member and teams are assigned a five-second penalty for each pane broken by the wrong player. The first team to solve the puzzle wins.
  - Played by: David & Justine vs. Shan & Xavier
- A Dark Turn: While tied together, teams enter a dark container to find a stack of varying sized film reels. Using their sense of touch, they must identify the order the reels are stacked in and replicate the stack outside. The first team to correctly replicate the stack wins.
  - Played by: Azah & Cinco vs. Leo & Sarah
- Spelling Eeb: Teams begin with stack of 60 tires. Each team member is asked to spell a word backwards. If they are incorrect, five tires are removed from their opponent’s stack. Afterwards, teams must transfer and restack their tires on a platform at the opposite end of the Arena, and each team member can only carry one tire at a time. The first team to restack all their tires wins.
  - Played by: Derek & Shannon vs. Enzo & Justine
- Ball & Chain: Teams must open six panels at the top of a tall wall to reveal six trivia questions. They must search among several medicine balls wrapped in chains for six with the answers on them, and place them on the wall above their respective question. The first team to correctly answer all six questions wins.
  - Played by: Alyssa & Leo vs. Kyland & Kyra
- Hall Brawl: Players must run through a narrow hallway past their opponent and ring a bell. The player who rings the bell first twice wins.
  - Played by: Enzo vs. Leo
- In a Roll: Each player begins inside a giant steel wheel connected to a 300-foot rope with a ball at the end. They must spin the wheel to unravel the rope and pull the ball towards them. The first player to pull the ball towards their wheel twice wins.
  - Played by: Cashay vs. Sarah
- Balls In: Played across five rounds. Each round, players play both offense and defense. The offense player attempts to deposit a ball into a goal at the center of a ring while the defense player attempts to stop them by blocking them and knocking the ball out of bounds. Players then switch positions before the end of the round. The player with the most goals scored at the end of the final round wins.
  - Played by: David vs. Enzo
- Pole Wrestle: Players begin at the center of the Arena with both hands on a metal pole. The first player to wrestle the pole out of their opponent's hands twice wins.
  - Played by: Alyssa vs. Angela

=== Final Challenge ===
The remaining contestants were flown to Patagonia for the Final Challenge, where they would race up Cerro López mountain. Players complete a series of checkpoints in male-female pairs, and individually for the Final Leg, to earn points based on their placements. The pairs were decided by the Algorithm; however, due to uneven numbers after Ben's medical disqualification, each female player would have to complete one checkpoint individually. The male and female players with the most points at the end of the Final Challenge are declared the winners of the season. To take home the money they currently possess in their bank account, players must finish the Final Challenge. If, at any point, a teammate quits, their partner is also out and both players' bank accounts are reduced to $0.

The first pair or individual to complete each checkpoint receives 5 points each; second receives 4 points; third receives 3 points; fourth receives 2 points; fifth receives 1 point. After each checkpoint, the Algorithm determines new pairs for the next checkpoint.

Day one

- Checkpoint #1: Teams or individuals must swim 500 metres (1,600 feet) from a barge to shore and solve a slide puzzle.
  - Eliminated: Desi & Enzo
- Checkpoint #2: Teams or individuals must consume a plate of raw onion and garlic cloves. They must then proceed down a path, finding a series of math operations printed on barrels along the way, and answer once they reach the end.
- Checkpoint #3: Teams or individuals memorize ten numbers before bringing a decoding wheel their station the end of the path. There, they must sum the ten numbers to determine the orientation to place the wheel, then match the numbers to letters and determine a ten-letter word.
- Checkpoint #4 and Overnight Stage: Teams or individuals must use a wheelbarrow to transfer a pile of dirt into a designated area. An unaired aspect of the checkpoint also required teams or individuals to find a combination underneath the dirt, pile the dirt back at its original location to reach two hanging black bags and release them using the combination. For teams, one team member may sleep in a tent while their partner is completing the checkpoint; the female player competing alone is given a smaller pile of dirt to transfer. After finishing, teams or individuals spend the rest of the night in a tent.
  - Eliminated: Angela

Day two

- Final Leg: The leg is worth "double points" where the first player to finish receives ten points, second receives eight points and third receives six points. As individuals, players complete a ten-mile race to the peak of Cerro López where the finish is located. Along the way, they must also solve a hexagonal puzzle and a Sudoku puzzle. The male and female players with the most points at the end are declared the winners of USA and split the unclaimed money from the $500,000 grand prize, which includes the bank account money of finalists who withdrew or were disqualified from the Final Challenge.
  - Results
    - Winners: Danny ($245,500) and Sarah ($254,500)
    - Eliminated: Cayla, Domenick, Justine & Tyson

== Game summary ==
Episode		Winners	Arena contestants		Arena game	Arena outcome	
No.	Challenge	Winners	Last place	Winners' pick	Arena game	Winner(s)	Eliminated
1	Down To Do the Math	Angela & Tyson	Azah & Kyland	Cely & Javonny	Knot So Fast	Azah & Kyland	Cely & Javonny
2	Yeah Buoy	Justine & Tyson	Cayla & James	Cashel & Tiffany	Knowledge Is Powered	Cayla & James	Cashel & Tiffany
3	Hang On Man	Angela & Kyland	James & Tasha	Cashay & Domenick	Plug and Play	Cashay & Domenick	James & Tasha
4	Falling Off the Knowledge	Alyssa & Kyland	David & Justine	Shan & Xavier	Smash In Puzzle Out	David & Justine	Shan & Xavier
5	Barreled Treasure	Cashay & Tyson	Azah & Cinco	Leo & Sarah	A Dark Turn	Leo & Sarah	Azah & Cinco
6	Containment	David & Desi	Enzo & Justine	Derek & Shannon	Spelling Eeb	Enzo & Justine	Derek & Shannon
7	Wreck-Reational Driving	Cayla & Domenick	Alyssa & Leo	Kyland & Kyra	Ball & Chain	Alyssa & Leo	Kyland & Kyra
8	Having A Blast	Angela	Enzo	Leo	Hall Brawl	Enzo	Leo
8	Having A Blast	Ben	Enzo	Leo	Hall Brawl	Enzo	Leo
9	Collect Four	Danny	Sarah	Cashay	In a Roll	Sarah	Cashay
9	Collect Four	Desi	Sarah	Cashay	In a Roll	Sarah	Cashay
10	Code Crossing	Angela	David	Enzo	Balls In	Enzo	David
10	Code Crossing	Ben	David	Enzo	Balls In	Enzo	David
11	Getting Tired	Domenick & Tyson	Angela	Alyssa	Pole Wrestle	Angela	Alyssa
11	Getting Tired	Sarah	Angela	Alyssa	Pole Wrestle	Angela	Alyssa
12	Final Challenge	Danny	2nd & 3rd: Domenick & Tyson, 4th: Enzo, 5th: Ben				
12	Final Challenge	Sarah	2nd & 3rd: Cayla & Justine, 4th: Angela, 5th: Desi				

== Episode progress ==
Contestants	Episodes											
Contestants	1	2	3	4	5	6	7	8	9	10	11	Finale
Danny	SAFE	SAFE	SAFE	SAFE	SAFE	SAFE	SAFE	SAFE	WIN	SAFE	SAFE	WINNER
Sarah	SAFE	SAFE	SAFE	SAFE	ELIM	SAFE	SAFE	SAFE	ELIM	SAFE	WIN	WINNER
Cayla	SAFE	ELIM	SAFE	SAFE	SAFE	SAFE	WIN	SAFE	SAFE	SAFE	SAFE	SECOND
Domenick	SAFE	SAFE	ELIM	SAFE	SAFE	SAFE	WIN	SAFE	SAFE	SAFE	WIN	SECOND
Justine	SAFE	WIN	SAFE	ELIM	SAFE	ELIM	SAFE	SAFE	SAFE	SAFE	SAFE	SECOND
Tyson	WIN	WIN	SAFE	SAFE	WIN	SAFE	SAFE	SAFE	SAFE	SAFE	WIN	SECOND
Angela	WIN	SAFE	WIN	SAFE	SAFE	SAFE	SAFE	WIN	SAFE	WIN	ELIM	FOURTH
Desi	SAFE	SAFE	SAFE	SAFE	SAFE	WIN	SAFE	SAFE	WIN	SAFE	SAFE	FIFTH
Enzo	SAFE	SAFE	SAFE	SAFE	SAFE	ELIM	SAFE	ELIM	SAFE	ELIM	SAFE	FOURTH
Ben	SAFE	SAFE	SAFE	SAFE	SAFE	SAFE	SAFE	WIN	SAFE	WIN	SAFE	FIFTH
Alyssa	SAFE	SAFE	SAFE	WIN	SAFE	SAFE	ELIM	SAFE	SAFE	SAFE	OUT	
David	SAFE	SAFE	SAFE	ELIM	SAFE	WIN	SAFE	SAFE	SAFE	OUT		
Cashay	SAFE	SAFE	ELIM	SAFE	WIN	SAFE	SAFE	SAFE	OUT			
Leo	SAFE	SAFE	SAFE	SAFE	ELIM	SAFE	ELIM	OUT				
Kyland	ELIM	SAFE	WIN	WIN	SAFE	SAFE	OUT					
Kyra	SAFE	SAFE	SAFE	SAFE	SAFE	SAFE	OUT					
Derek	SAFE	SAFE	SAFE	SAFE	SAFE	OUT						
Shannon	SAFE	SAFE	SAFE	SAFE	SAFE	OUT						
Azah	ELIM	SAFE	SAFE	SAFE	OUT							
Cinco	SAFE	SAFE	SAFE	SAFE	OUT							
Shan	SAFE	SAFE	SAFE	OUT								
Xavier	SAFE	SAFE	SAFE	OUT								
James	SAFE	ELIM	OUT									
Tasha	SAFE	SAFE	OUT									
Cashel	SAFE	OUT										
Tiffany	SAFE	OUT										
Cely	OUT											
Javonny	OUT											

== Bank progress ==
Bank accounts at the end of each episode
Contestants	Episodes											
Contestants	1	2	3	4	5	6	7	8	9	10	11	Finale
Danny	$1,000	$1,000	$1,000	$1,000	$1,000	$1,000	$1,000	$1,000	$6,000	$6,000	$6,000	$245,500
Sarah	$1,000	$1,000	$1,000	$1,000	$2,500	$2,500	$2,500	$2,500	$10,000	$10,000	$15,000	$254,500
Cayla	$1,000	$2,000	$2,000	$2,000	$2,000	$2,000	$7,000	$7,000	$7,000	$7,000	$7,000	$0
Domenick	$1,000	$1,000	$2,500	$2,500	$2,500	$2,500	$7,500	$7,500	$7,500	$7,500	$10,000	$0
Justine	$1,000	$6,000	$6,000	$7,000	$7,000	$8,000	$8,000	$8,000	$8,000	$8,000	$8,000	$0
Tyson	$6,000	$11,000	$11,000	$11,000	$16,000	$16,000	$16,000	$16,000	$16,000	$16,000	$18,500	$0
Angela	$6,000	$6,000	$11,000	$11,000	$11,000	$11,000	$11,000	$16,000	$16,000	$21,000	$33,500	$0
Desi	$1,000	$1,000	$1,000	$1,000	$1,000	$6,000	$6,000	$6,000	$11,000	$11,000	$11,000	$0
Enzo	$1,000	$1,000	$1,000	$1,000	$1,000	$2,000	$2,000	$11,000	$11,000	$18,000	$18,000	$0
Ben	$1,000	$1,000	$1,000	$1,000	$1,000	$1,000	$1,000	$6,000	$6,000	$11,000	$11,000	$0
Alyssa	$1,000	$1,000	$1,000	$6,000	$6,000	$6,000	$12,500	$12,500	$12,500	$12,500	$0	
David	$1,000	$1,000	$1,000	$2,000	$2,000	$7,000	$7,000	$7,000	$7,000	$0		
Cashay	$1,000	$1,000	$2,500	$2,500	$7,500	$7,500	$7,500	$7,500	$0			
Leo	$1,000	$1,000	$1,000	$1,000	$2,500	$2,500	$9,000	$0				
Kyland	$2,000	$2,000	$7,000	$12,000	$12,000	$12,000	$0					
Kyra	$1,000	$1,000	$1,000	$1,000	$1,000	$1,000	$0					
Derek	$1,000	$1,000	$1,000	$1,000	$1,000	$0						
Shannon	$1,000	$1,000	$1,000	$1,000	$1,000	$0						
Azah	$2,000	$2,000	$2,000	$2,000	$0							
Cinco	$1,000	$1,000	$1,000	$1,000	$0							
Shan	$1,000	$1,000	$1,000	$0								
Xavier	$1,000	$1,000	$1,000	$0								
James	$1,000	$2,000	$0									
Tasha	$1,000	$1,000	$0									
Cashel	$1,000	$0										
Tiffany	$1,000	$0										
Cely	$0											
Javonny	$0											

Competition
The contestant won the Final Challenge.
The contestant withdrew from the Final Challenge.
The contestant was disqualified from the Final Challenge.
The contestant was removed from the competition for medical reasons.
The contestant won the daily challenge and earned $5,000 for their bank account.
The contestant was not selected for the Arena.
The contestant won the elimination in the Arena and received their opponent's bank account money.
The contestant lost in the Arena and was eliminated.

== Team progress ==
For the first episode, players chose their own teams prior to the "Down to Do the Math" challenge. From episode two to episode seven, and the Final Challenge, teams were decided by the Algorithm. From episode eight, players competed as individuals.

Contestants	Episodes															
Contestants	1	2	3	4	5	6	7	8	9	10	11	Finale				
Danny	Shan	Desi	Azah	Kyra	Angela	Alyssa	Justine	Individual; Game				Cayla	Angela	Sarah	Justine	Individual; Game
Sarah	Enzo	Kyland	Cinco	Derek	Leo	Ben	Tyson	Individual; Game				—N/a	Tyson	Danny	Domenick	Individual; Game
Cayla	David	James	Xavier	Tyson	Derek	Leo	Domenick	Individual; Game				Danny	—N/a	Domenick	Tyson	Individual; Game
Domenick	Justine	Shannon	Cashay	Angela	Desi	Angela	Cayla	Individual; Game				Angela	Justine	Cayla	Sarah	Individual; Game
Justine	Domenick	Tyson	Leo	David	Ben	Enzo	Danny	Individual; Game				Tyson	Domenick	—N/a	Danny	Individual; Game
Tyson	Angela	Justine	Alyssa	Cayla	Cashay	Kyra	Sarah	Individual; Game				Justine	Sarah	Angela	Cayla	Individual; Game
Angela	Tyson	Leo	Kyland	Domenick	Danny	Domenick	Enzo	Individual; Game				Domenick	Danny	Tyson	—N/a	
Desi	Cinco	Danny	Enzo	Leo	Domenick	David	Ben	Individual; Game				Enzo				
Enzo	Sarah	Alyssa	Desi	Cashay	Kyra	Justine	Angela	Individual; Game				Desi				
Ben	Alyssa	Shan	Kyra	Azah	Justine	Sarah	Desi	Individual; Game								
Alyssa	Ben	Enzo	Tyson	Kyland	David	Danny	Leo	Individual; Game								
David	Cayla	Kyra	Shannon	Justine	Alyssa	Desi	Cashay	Individual; Game								
Cashay	Derek	Cinco	Domenick	Enzo	Tyson	Kyland	David	Individual; Game								
Leo	Tiffany	Angela	Justine	Desi	Sarah	Cayla	Alyssa	Individual; Game								
Kyland	Azah	Sarah	Angela	Alyssa	Shannon	Cashay	Kyra									
Kyra	Cashel	David	Ben	Danny	Enzo	Tyson	Kyland									
Derek	Cashay	Tasha	Shan	Sarah	Cayla	Shannon										
Shannon	James	Domenick	David	Cinco	Kyland	Derek										
Azah	Kyland	Xavier	Danny	Ben	Cinco											
Cinco	Desi	Cashay	Sarah	Shannon	Azah											
Shan	Danny	Ben	Derek	Xavier												
Xavier	Tasha	Azah	Cayla	Shan												
James	Shannon	Cayla	Tasha													
Tasha	Xavier	Derek	James													
Cashel	Kyra	Tiffany														
Tiffany	Leo	Cashel														
Cely	Javonny															
Javonny	Cely															

== Episodes ==
No. overall	No. in season	Title	Original release date	Prod. code	U.S. viewers (millions)
1	1	"The United States of Challenge"	July 6, 2022	101	2.33
2	2	"Oh Say Can You See Tiffany"	July 13, 2022	102	2.20
3	3	"Declarations of Independence"	July 20, 2022	103	2.13
4	4	"Liberty and Justice For All"	July 27, 2022	104	2.18
5	5	"In Tyson We Trust"	August 3, 2022	105	2.08
6	6	"A Civil War"	August 10, 2022	106	2.19
7	7	"State of the Unions"	August 17, 2022	107	2.19
8	8	"Independence Day"	August 24, 2022	108	2.10
9	9	"Nevertheless She Persisted"	August 31, 2022	109	1.94
10	10	"Pledges of Allegiance"	September 7, 2022	110	2.11
11	11	"Home of the Brave"	September 14, 2022	111	1.76
12	12	"Home of the Brave"	September 14, 2022	112	1.76
