= Judith O'Dea =

American actress (born 1945)

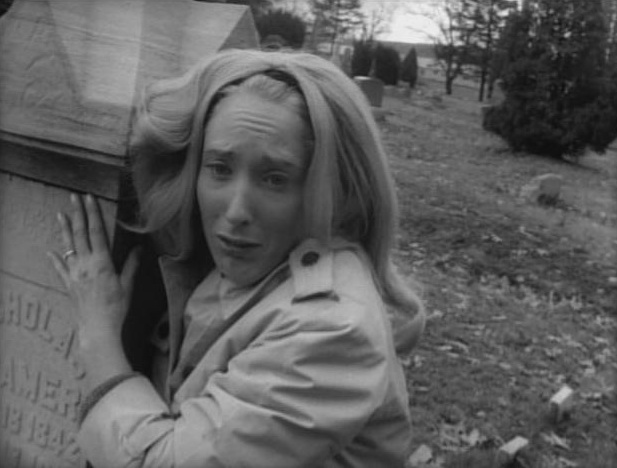
- O'Dea in Night of the Living Dead (1968)
- Born: April 20, 1945 (age 81); Pittsburgh, Pennsylvania, U.S.
- Occupation: Actress
- Years active: 1967-present

Judith O'Dea (born April 20, 1945) is an American actress. She portrayed Barbra in the 1968 George A. Romero classic horror film Night of the Living Dead and Vampira in the 2024 cult comedy Vampire Zombies... from Space!

== Career ==
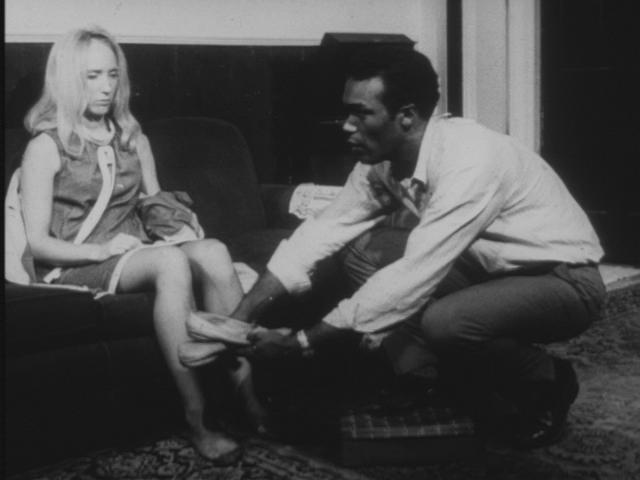
O'Dea as the catatonic and helpless Barbra in Night of the Living Dead, seen here with Duane Jones

In addition to her signature role, O'Dea has appeared in the television movie The Pirate in the 1970s. She later took a break from acting to focus on raising her family.

In the 2000s, O'Dea returned to acting in several indie horror films, including Claustrophobia, October Moon, October Moon 2: November Son and Women's Studies. She also returned to the Barbra role for Night of the Living Dead: Genesis., plus the 2017 film Safe Inside and its 2025 sequel Safe Inside 2.

In 2024 O'Dea appeared in the Canadian comedy Vampire Zombies... from Space!, a parody of and homage to horror and sci-fi films of the 1950s. O'Dea portrayed Vampira, a role which earned her a nomination for Best Supporting Performance at Atlanta's Buried Alive Film Festival, and a Best Ensemble win from Canada's Terror in the Bay Film Festival.

She owns and operates O'Dea Communications, a firm that deals in oral-communications training.

== Filmography ==
Year	Film	Role	Notes
1968	Night of the Living Dead	Barbra	
1978	The Pirate	Annie	TV movie
2003	Claustrophobia	Alena Gray	
2005	October Moon	Mrs. Hamilton	
2008	October Moon 2: November Son	Emily Hamilton	aka November Son
2009	Timo Rose's Beast	Boomer's Mother	
2010	Women's Studies	Senator Gayle Hamlin	
2011	Shy of Normal: Tales of New Life Experiences	Actress on TV	
2014	Hole in the Wall	Augusta Gein	
2014	They Came from the Ether	Miss Clara	
2015	Abandoned Dead	Doctor Pamela Myers	
2017	Safe Inside	Crystal Lake	
2024	Vampire Zombies... from Space!	Vampira	Won: "Best Ensemble" (Terror in the Bay Film Festival) Nom: "Best Supporting Performance" (Buried Alive Film Festival)
2025	Safe Inside 2	Crystal Lake	
