= Foreign Correspondents (film) =

- DVD cover
- Directed by: Mark Tapio Kines
- Written by: Mark Tapio Kines
- Produced by: Julia Stemock
- Starring: Melanie Lynskey; Wil Wheaton; Corin Nemec; Yelena Danova
- Cinematography: Scott Spears
- Edited by: Jay Woelfel
- Music by: Christopher Farrell
- Production companies: Cassava Films; Greenstem Productions
- Distributed by: Creative Light Entertainment; Greenstem Enterprises
- Release dates: 1999 (festival circuit); September 17, 2001 (U.S. home video)
- Running time: 102 minutes
- Country: United States
- Language: English
- Budget: $500,000

Foreign Correspondents is a 1999 American drama portmanteau film. Written and directed by Mark Tapio Kines in his directorial debut, it stars Melanie Lynskey, Wil Wheaton, Corin Nemec, and Yelena Danova.

The film drew attention for being the first ever to utilize crowdfunding as a means of attaining its budget. It premiered in February 1999 and played at the Chicago Alt.Film Fest that same year, receiving the Jury Award for Best Screenplay, as well as a Best Actress nomination for Lynskey. It was released to home video in 2001.

== Premise ==
When postcards meant for the previous tenant begin arriving at the apartment of lonely young receptionist Melody, she finds herself sucked into a mysterious relationship she's no business being part of. Meanwhile, in a different stretch of Los Angeles, Englishman Trevor has flown in to meet his penpal—a Bosnian refugee on the verge of being sent back to her war-ravaged homeland—but the visit takes a dramatic turn when he discovers the real reason his friend has asked him to come.

== Cast ==
- Melanie Lynskey as Melody
- Wil Wheaton as Jonas
- Corin Nemec as Trevor
- Yelena Danova as Mira
- Steve Valentine as Ian
- Blaire Baron as Rachel
- Douglas Coler as Nils
- Lisa LoCicero as Christina
- Alice Cunningham as Mary
- Guy Lewis as Michael
- James Michael Tyler as Randy
- Lillian Adams as Sonya
- Earl Schuman as Sam
- Richard Moll as Man in Bookstore

== Production ==
Mark Tapio Kines originally envisioned the film as a 50-minute short with one single, self-contained narrative, but decided to expand it to feature length by joining together a pair of loosely connected vignettes, titled "Dear Jenny" and "Love, Trevor", respectively. Following completion of his script, Kines reached out to Melanie Lynskey—who was living in New Zealand and hadn't played a lead role since Heavenly Creatures two years prior—to offer her the part of Melody, after reading online that she was eager to work in America. Kines employed crowdfunding—a strategy considered to be a "breakthrough" at the time—to raise the film's budget, which grew from an initial $40,000 to a final $500,000. Filming took place in Los Angeles in 1997, with principal photography wrapping on August 11.

== Release and reception ==
After playing at various festivals around the world, the film was distributed independently on video and DVD by Kines in 2001. It was later made available for streaming on Netflix.

In a mixed review, the Chicago Reader criticised the film's logic and lack of emotional resonance, but felt that Lynskey's work was strong, while saying of Kines, "[his] visual sense and attention to details are fairly adroit, and his graceful fades and camera movement suggest a gnawing mystery and a languorous desolation that almost compensate for the plot holes". While believing it to be "semi-touching", Film Threat felt Correspondents "would have been better as two shorts", adding that the connective stories have "no solid relationship". They were more enthusiastic about the performances, praising Wheaton and Nemec, and describing Lynskey as "perfect".
