= Philip Yeagle =

American biologist

Philip L. Yeagle is an American biologist, focusing in critical problems of membrane protein structure. Dr. Yeagle was a professor at University of Connecticut. In 2007, Yeagle was appointed dean of Rutgers University's Faculty of Arts and Sciences in Newark. He is an Elected Fellow of the American Association for the Advancement of Science.
