= Dean Yeagle =

American animator and cartoonist (born 1947)

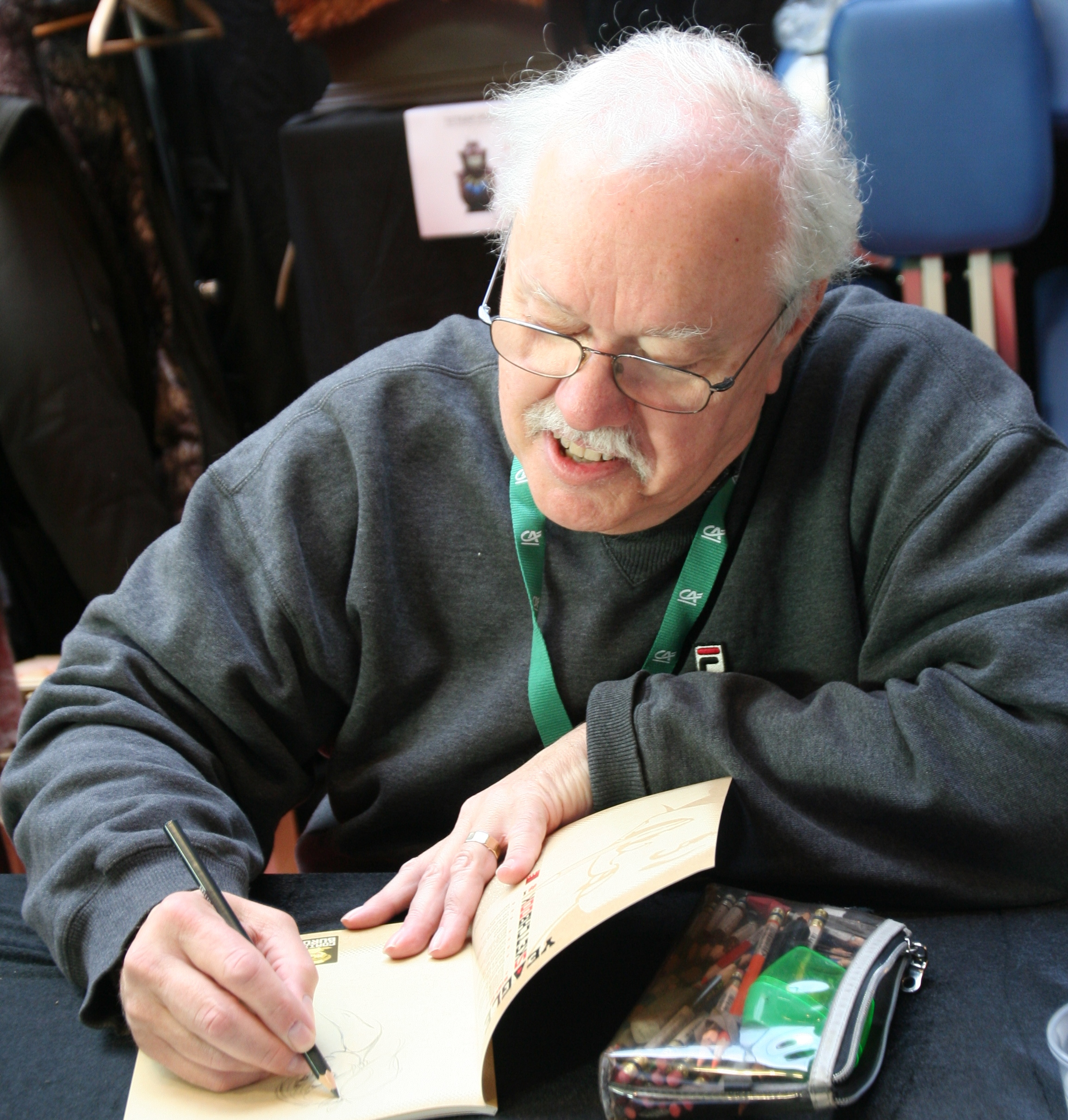
- Dean Yeagle in Quai des Bulles, Saint-Malo comics festival, 2012
- Born: July 27, 1947 (age 79)
- Occupation: Cartoonist

Dean Eric Yeagle (born July 27, 1947) is an American animator and cartoonist, born in the United States, known for his character Mandy, which has appeared in the pages of Playboy magazine.

== Early life ==
As a young Disney fan, Yeagle set his sights on becoming an animator for Disney around the age of 10. During this time he often drew Disney characters, but later began to develop his own. After graduating from high school, Yeagle went to art school, leaving after a year.

== Career ==
Yeagle began his animation career in a small studio in Philadelphia with a summer job, giving him his first taste of the industry. He served four years in the Navy during the Vietnam era, and later worked for Jack Zander (who once animated Tom and Jerry cartoons for MGM) in Zander's Animation Parlour, New York.

Seven years after starting at Zander's Animation Parlour, Yeagle began freelancing, working for most of the New York animation studios before starting his own, Caged Beagle Productions, in 1986 with Nancy Beiman. Caged Beagle produces TV commercials, CD-ROMs, sub-contracts or consults on features and character design.

Yeagle has worked as a designer, animator and director, and he was nominated by the National Cartoonist Society (NCS) for the 2003 Gag Award for his work in Playboy Magazine.

Yeagle's clients have included Blue Sky Studios, Broderbund, Dannon, Grey Advertising, Hanna-Barbera, Holt, Rinehart and Winston, ImaginEngine, Kraft, Marvel Comics, Nestle, Playboy Enterprises, Procter & Gamble, Random House, Saatchi & Saatchi, Walt Disney Productions, Warner Bros. and Western Publishing.
