= Clea DuVall =

American actress (born 1977)

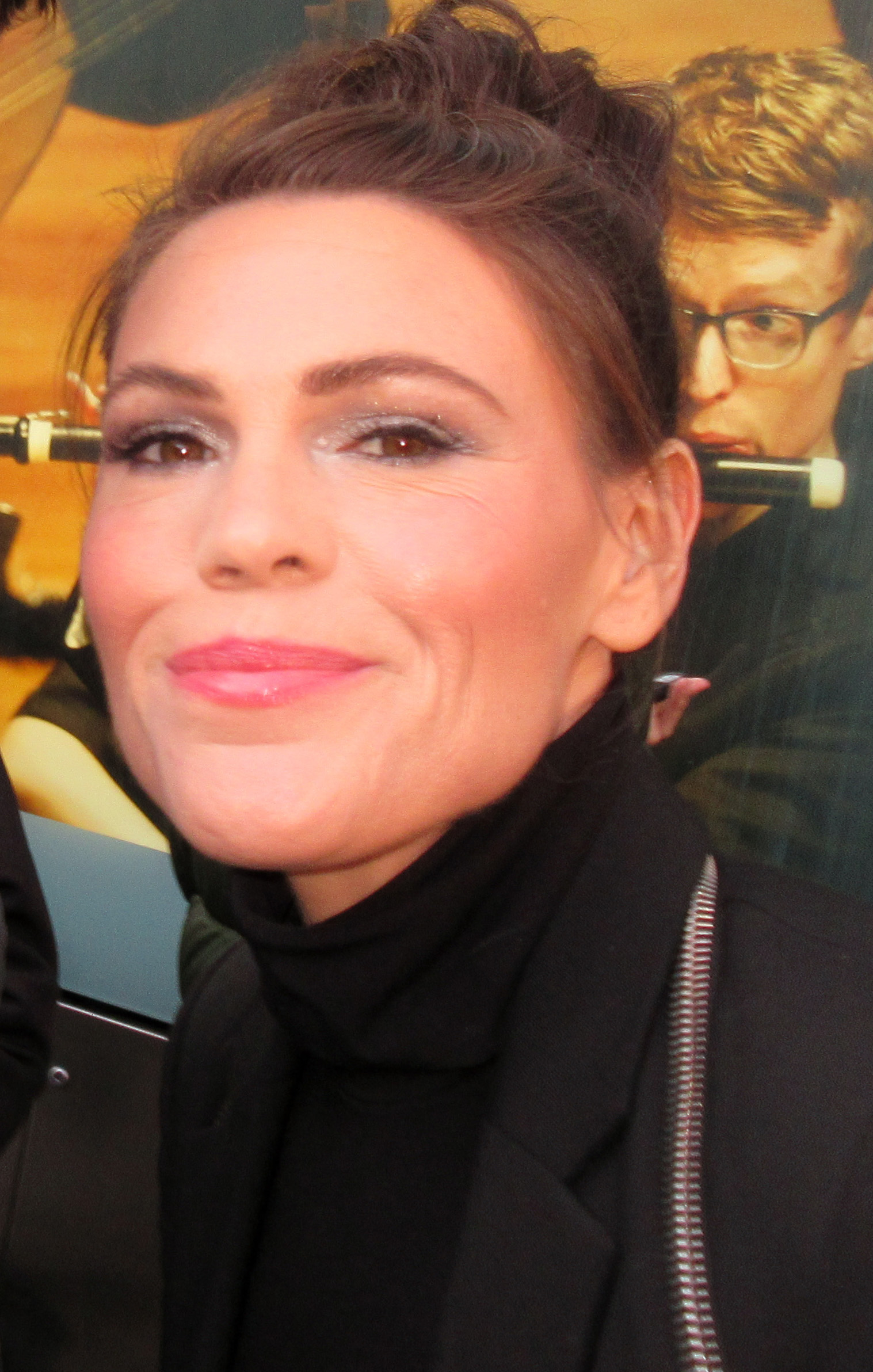
- DuVall in 2019
- Born: Clea Helen D'Etienne DuVall; September 25, 1977 (age 49); Los Angeles, California, U.S.
- Occupations: Actress; director; producer; writer
- Years active: 1996–present

Clea Helen D'Etienne DuVall (born September 25, 1977) is an American actress, director, producer, and screenwriter. She rose to prominence in the late 1990s with supporting roles in The Faculty (1998), But I'm a Cheerleader, and Girl, Interrupted (both 1999). Subsequent film credits include Ghosts of Mars (2001), Identity, 21 Grams (both 2003), The Grudge (2004), Zodiac (2007), and Argo (2012).

On television, DuVall has appeared in recurring and regular roles on series such as Carnivàle (2003–2005), Heroes (2006–2007), American Horror Story (2012–2013), The Lizzie Borden Chronicles (2015), Better Call Saul (2015–2017), Veep (2016–2019), and The Handmaid's Tale (2018–2022). She also voiced Elsa in the animated sitcom HouseBroken (2021–2023), which she co-created.

DuVall's directorial work includes the comedy features The Intervention (2016) and Happiest Season (2020). She also created, wrote, and executive produced the coming-of-age drama series High School (2022).

== Early life ==
DuVall was born and raised in Los Angeles, California. Her forename derives from the novel Clea by Lawrence Durrell. She worked in a coffee shop as a teenager and studied at the Los Angeles County High School for the Arts.

== Career ==
=== 1996–2000: Career beginnings ===
DuVall made her screen debut in the low-budget horror film Little Witches (1996). This was followed by small parts in several independent features, as well as guest appearances on ER and Buffy the Vampire Slayer (both 1997). Her breakthrough came in 1998 when she starred in Robert Rodriguez's sci-fi horror film The Faculty, receiving positive reviews for her portrayal of Stokely "Stokes" Mitchell, a goth high school student. Also that year, she had a supporting role in the teen comedy Can't Hardly Wait, which later developed a cult following.

DuVall had roles in several films released in 1999, including the biographical drama Girl, Interrupted, where she appeared as compulsive liar Georgina Tuskin; teen romantic comedy She's All That, which opened atop the U.S. box office; and the independent features Wildflowers and But I'm a Cheerleader. The latter, a satirical comedy in which she played a lesbian undergoing conversion therapy, is often cited as a favorite among fans of LGBTQ cinema. For her work in Wildflowers, a drama about a 17-year-old intent on finding her birth mother, DuVall received rave reviews, with Barry Johnson noting in his appraisal for The Austin Chronicle, "[she] has those deep, round, chestnut eyes that convey years of experience with a solitary glance ... [she] always seems to capture that unique blend of wisdom and naiveté ... [here she] takes center stage in an impressive, nuanced performance that makes use of [her] magnetic screen presence".

=== 2001–2015: Film and television roles ===
DuVall played supporting roles in a variety of features throughout the early 2000s, such as Ghosts of Mars (2001), a space Western directed by John Carpenter; ensemble drama Thirteen Conversations About One Thing (2001); The Laramie Project (2002), a documentary-style dramatisation of the murder of Matthew Shepard; coming-of-age sports drama The Slaughter Rule (2002); the James Mangold–directed mystery thriller Identity (2003); and the psychological crime drama 21 Grams (2003), the critically acclaimed English-language debut of Alejandro González Iñárritu.

DuVall appeared as a series regular on the HBO drama series Carnivàle from 2003 to 2005, with the Los Angeles Times pointing out that her portrayal of tarot card reader Sophie was "especially good". She also starred in the television film Helter Skelter (2004) during that period, earning a Satellite Award nomination for her portrayal of real-life cult member Linda Kasabian; and in the hit horror film The Grudge (2004), which grossed US$187 million at the box office. Subsequent credits included guest appearances on CSI (2005), Lie to Me (2009), Numb3rs, Bones, and Law & Order (all 2010), as well as key parts in films such as David Fincher's Zodiac (2007) and the recurring role of Audrey Hanson on the NBC sci-fi series Heroes (2006–2007).

Following appearances in Anamorph (2007) and Passengers (2008) and a small part in the legal drama Conviction (2010), DuVall co-starred in Ben Affleck's Argo (2012), a political thriller based on the Iran hostage crisis of 1979–1981. For her portrayal of Cora Amburn-Lijek, one of the six American diplomats rescued from Iran in 1980, DuVall was awarded—alongside her co-stars—the SAG Award for Outstanding Performance by a Cast in a Motion Picture. Also in 2012, she appeared in the recurring role of Wendy Peyser on the second season of the FX anthology series American Horror Story. Writing for Slate, Alyssa Rosenberg said of her work in the latter projects, "Where DuVall often played strong, even aggressive characters in the past, in both American Horror Story and Argo, she's turned in good performances by playing deeply vulnerable people trying to be strong in threatening circumstances".

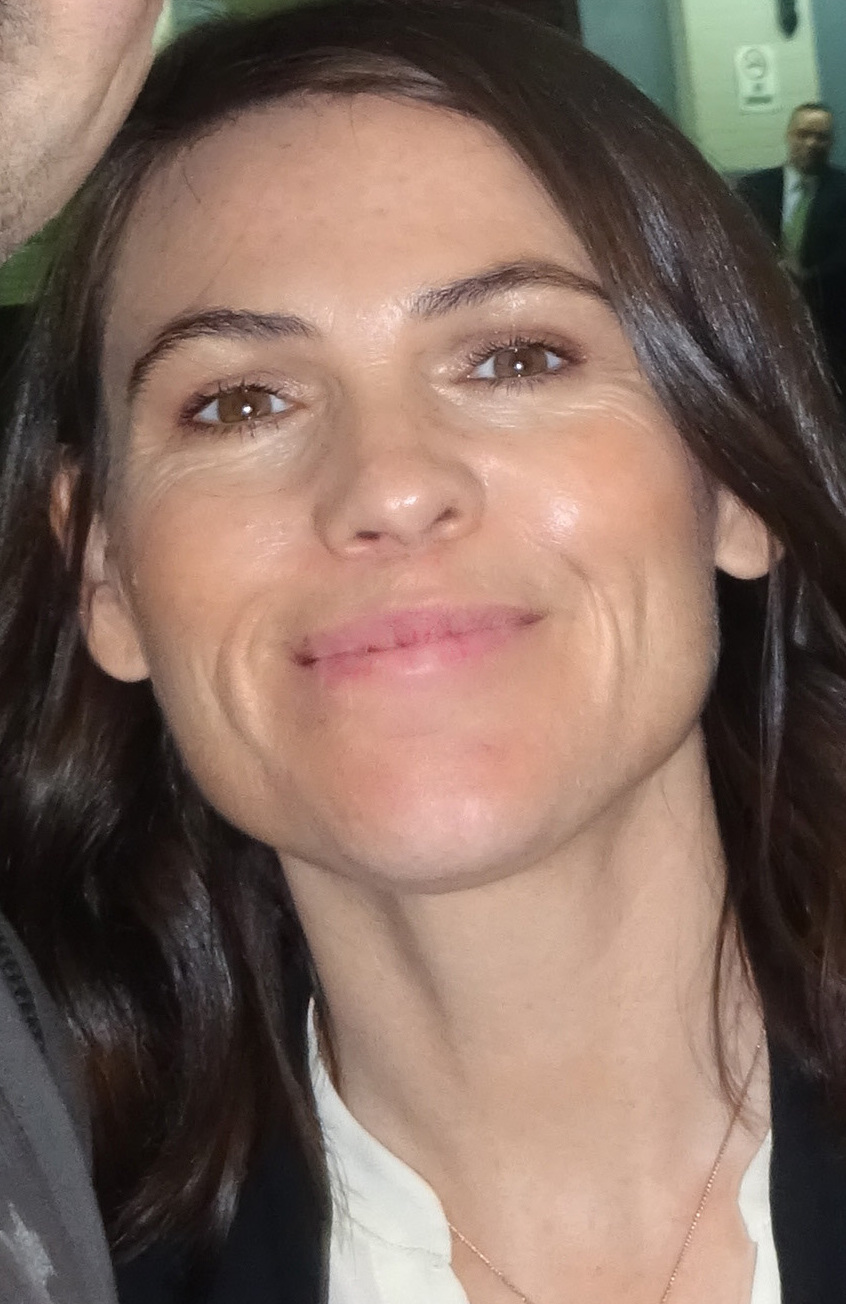
DuVall in 2016

DuVall starred as Emma Borden, sister of Lizzie Borden—played by Christina Ricci—in the Lifetime television film Lizzie Borden Took an Ax (2014), reprising the role for the limited series The Lizzie Borden Chronicles the following year. The show received mixed reviews, but critics praised the performances of Ricci and DuVall; writing for The Hollywood Reporter, Keith Uhlich said the actresses "have a delectable rapport not too far removed from Bette Davis and Joan Crawford at their hag-horror peak in What Ever Happened to Baby Jane?".

=== Since 2016: Directorial debut and subsequent work ===
DuVall made her feature directorial debut with The Intervention (2016), which she also wrote, starred in, and produced. Acquired by Paramount Pictures after its premiere at the 2016 Sundance Film Festival, the comedy-drama was positively reviewed; Andy Webster of The New York Times noted that "DuVall juggles the emotional dynamics with fluid editing and light comic touches". That same year, she starred in the independent features Zen Dogs and Heaven's Floor, and guest-starred in three episodes of AMC's Better Call Saul.

Between 2016 and 2019, DuVall played Marjorie Palmiotti on HBO's political satire series Veep, for which she was twice nominated—alongside her co-stars—for the SAG Award for Outstanding Performance by an Ensemble in a Comedy Series, winning in 2018. She also starred in the independent dramedy All About Nina (2018) and portrayed Sylvia in five episodes of the dystopian Hulu series The Handmaid's Tale (2018–2022), with Judy Berman of Time calling it "the best work of [DuVall's career]".

DuVall wrote and directed the 2020 romcom Happiest Season, which premiered on Hulu to a positive critical reception, later winning the 2021 GLAAD Media Award for Outstanding Film. Her next project—as creator, writer, director, and executive producer—was the coming-of-age drama series High School, which ran for a single season on Amazon Freevee. Rolling Stone named it one of the best shows of 2022, writing in their review, "[DuVall captures] the thrilling, horrifying, profoundly uncomfortable experience of adolescence". She earned additional praise that year for her portrayal of Malvina "Tommy" Thompson, personal aide to Eleanor Roosevelt, in the Showtime drama series The First Lady.

DuVall's performance in a 2023 episode of the Peacock murder mystery series Poker Face was particularly well received. She returned to direct an episode of the show in 2025.

In February 2026, DuVall was cast as a member of the Seraphites in the third season of the HBO post-apocalyptic drama series The Last of Us.

== Personal life ==
DuVall is a lesbian. She privately came out to close relatives and friends when she was 16, and publicly came out in 2016. DuVall has said that she was "very closeted" while making But I'm a Cheerleader. She is close friends with Melanie Lynskey and Natasha Lyonne, with whom she worked on Cheerleader and The Intervention. DuVall is married to Mia Weier and lives in Los Angeles.

== Filmography ==
=== Film ===
Year	Title	Role	Notes
1996	Little Witches	Kelsey	
1997	The Alarmist	Suzy	
1997	Niagara, Niagara	Convenience store clerk	
1998	How to Make the Cruelest Month	Bell Bryant	
1998	Girl	Gillian	
1998	Can't Hardly Wait	Jana	
1998	The Faculty	Stokely "Stokes" Mitchell	
1999	A Slipping-Down Life	Nurse	
1999	She's All That	Misty	
1999	Wildflowers	Cally	
1999	Sleeping Beauties	Clea	Short film
1999	The Astronaut's Wife	Nan	
1999	But I'm a Cheerleader	Graham Eaton	
1999	Girl, Interrupted	Georgina Tuskin	
2000	Committed	Mimi	
2001	See Jane Run	Jane Whittaker	
2001	Ghosts of Mars	Bashira Kincaid	
2001	Thirteen Conversations About One Thing	Bea	
2001	How to Make a Monster	Laura Wheeler	
2002	The Slaughter Rule	Skyla Sisco	
2003	Identity	Ginny Isiana	
2003	21 Grams	Claudia	
2004	The Grudge	Jennifer Williams	
2005	Two Weeks	Katrina	
2006	Champions	Billy	
2007	Zodiac	Linda Del Buono	
2007	Ten Inch Hero	Jen	
2007	Itty Bitty Titty Committee	Singer	
2007	Anamorph	Sandy Strickland	
2008	Passengers	Shannon	
2009	The Killing Room	Kerry Isalano	
2010	Conviction	Brenda Marsh	
2012	Argo	Cora Amburn-Lijek	
2013	Armed Response	Lena	Also executive producer
2014	Jackie & Ryan	Virginia	
2014	Zen Dog	Marlene Meeks	
2015	Ma/ddy	Dana	
2015	Addicted to Fresno	Regina	
2016	The Intervention	Jessie	Also writer, director, and executive producer
2016	Heaven's Floor	Julia	
2018	All About Nina	Paula	
2020	Happiest Season	—N/a	Co-writer and director only
2025	Swiped	Charlotte	

=== Television ===
Year	Title	Role	Notes
1996	Dangerous Minds	Nina	Episode: "Evolution"
1997	ER	Katy Reed	2 episodes
1997	Crisis Center	Laura Thomas	Episode: "Where Truth Lies"
1997	Buffy the Vampire Slayer	Marcie Ross	Episode: "Out of Mind, Out of Sight"
1997	On the Edge of Innocence	Ann	Television film
1997	The Defenders: Payback	Jessica Lane	Television film
2000	Popular	Wanda Rickets	2 episodes
2001	The Fugitive	Lynette Hennessy	2 episodes
2001	How to Make a Monster	Laura	Television film
2002	The Laramie Project	Amanda Gronich	Television film
2003–2005	Carnivàle	Sofie Agnesh Bojakshiya	Main role
2004	Helter Skelter	Linda Kasabian	Television film
2005	CSI: Crime Scene Investigation	Abigail Spencer	Episode: "Shooting Stars"
2005	Fathers and Sons	Laura	Television film; uncredited
2006–2007	Heroes	Audrey Hanson	Recurring role
2008	Grey's Anatomy	Jennifer Robinson	2 episodes
2008	Law & Order: Special Victims Unit	Mia Latimer	Episode: "Persona"
2008	The Watch	Cassie	Television film
2009	Virtuality	Sue Parsons	Television film
2009	Saving Grace	Maura Darrell	Episode: "Looks Like a Lesbian Attack to Me"
2009	Lie to Me	Michelle Russell	Episode: "Blinded"
2010	Private Practice	Natasha	Episode: "Fear of Flying"
2010	Bones	McKenna Grant	Episode: "The Bones on the Blue Line"
2010	Numb3rs	Melanie Bailey	Episode: "Devil Girl"
2010	Law & Order	Amanda Green	Episode: "The Taxman Cometh"
2010–2011	The Event	Maya	3 episodes
2011	CSI: Miami	Lyla Moore	Episode: "About Face"
2011	And Baby Will Fall	Melinda White	Television film
2012–2013	American Horror Story: Asylum	Wendy Peyser	5 episodes
2014	The Newsroom	Lilly Hart	2 episodes
2014	Lizzie Borden Took an Ax	Emma Borden	Television film
2015	The Lizzie Borden Chronicles	Emma Borden	Main role
2015–2017	Better Call Saul	Lara Cruz	3 episodes
2016	Brooklyn Animal Control	Madeleine Holmlund	Unsold pilot
2016	New Girl	Camilla	Episode: "Wig"
2016–2019	Veep	Marjorie Palmiotti	Recurring role (seasons 5–6); main role (season 7)
2018	Take My Wife	Audience Member	Episode #2.3
2018	The Romanoffs	Patricia Callahan	Episode: "End of the Line"
2018–2022	The Handmaid's Tale	Sylvia	5 episodes
2019	Broad City	Lesley Marnel	3 episodes
2019	Looking for Alaska	—N/a	Director only; episode: "I'll Show You That It Won't Shoot"
2021–2023	HouseBroken	Elsa (voice)	Also co-creator, executive producer, and writer
2021	Q-Force	(voice)	2 episodes
2022	The First Lady	Malvina "Tommy" Thompson	Recurring role
2022	High School	—N/a	Creator, director, and writer only
2023	Poker Face	Emily Cale	Episode: "The Hook"
2025	Poker Face	—N/a	Director only; episode: "The Big Pump"
2026	The Comeback	Peri	Episode: "Valerie's Home Alone"
2027	The Last of Us	Seraphite	Guest (season 3)

== Accolades ==
Year	Association	Category	Nominated work	Result	Ref.
1999	Blockbuster Entertainment Awards	Favorite Female Newcomer	The Faculty	Nominated	
1999	Fangoria Chainsaw Awards	Best Supporting Actress	The Faculty	Nominated	
1999	Teen Choice Awards	Breakout Performance (Film)	The Faculty	Nominated	
2003	Florida Film Critics Circle	Best Ensemble (shared with the cast)	Thirteen Conversations About One Thing	Won	
2004	Satellite Awards	Best Actress – Miniseries or Television Film	Helter Skelter	Nominated	
2005	Women's Image Network Awards	Best Actress in a Drama Series	Carnivàle	Nominated	
2012	Hollywood Film Awards	Ensemble of the Year (shared with the cast)	Argo	Won	
2012	Palm Springs International Film Festival	Best Ensemble Cast (shared with the cast)	Argo	Won	
2012	San Diego Film Critics Society	Best Ensemble Performance (shared with the cast)	Argo	Nominated	
2013	Screen Actors Guild Awards	Outstanding Performance by a Cast in a Motion Picture (shared with the cast)	Argo	Won	
2016	Sundance Film Festival	Grand Jury Prize	The Intervention	Nominated	
2017	Screen Actors Guild Awards	Outstanding Performance by an Ensemble in a Comedy Series (shared with the cast)	Veep	Nominated	
2018	Screen Actors Guild Awards	Outstanding Performance by an Ensemble in a Comedy Series (shared with the cast)	Veep	Won	
2021	GLAAD Media Awards	Outstanding Film – Wide Release	Happiest Season	Won	
2023	Gotham Awards	Breakthrough Series – Short Form (shared with the producers)	High School	Nominated	

== See also ==
- List of female film and television directors
- List of lesbian filmmakers
- List of LGBT-related films directed by women
