= Christina Ricci =

American actress (born 1980)

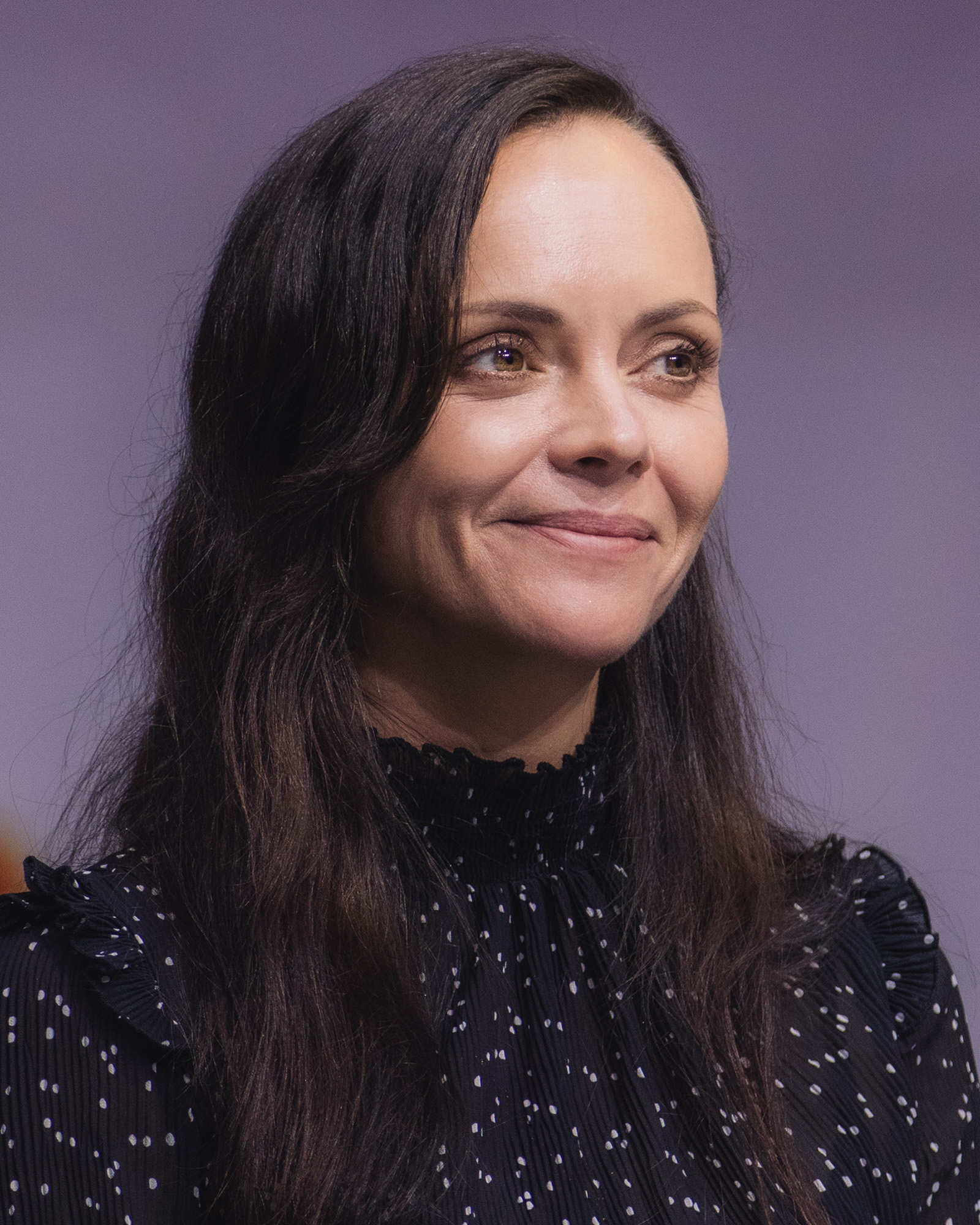
- Ricci in 2024
- Born: February 12, 1980 (age 46); Santa Monica, California, U.S.
- Occupations: Actress; producer
- Years active: 1989–present
- Spouses: James Heerdegen (m. 2013; div. 2021) Mark Hampton (m. 2021)
- Children: 2

Christina Ricci (/ˈriːtʃi/ REE-chee; born February 12, 1980) is an American actress. Known for playing unusual characters with a dark edge, Ricci works mostly in independent productions, but she has also appeared in numerous box-office hits. She is the recipient of Golden Globe, Screen Actors Guild, and Primetime Emmy Award nominations.

Ricci made her film debut at age ten in Mermaids (1990), which was followed by a breakout role as Wednesday Addams in The Addams Family (1991) and its 1993 sequel. Subsequent roles in Casper and Now and Then (both 1995) established her as a teen idol. In her late teens, she moved into adult-oriented projects such as The Ice Storm (1997), Buffalo '66, The Opposite of Sex, Pecker (all 1998), 200 Cigarettes, and Sleepy Hollow (both 1999). Her other credits include The Man Who Cried (2000), Prozac Nation (2001), Pumpkin (2002), Anything Else, Monster (both 2003), Cursed (2005), Penelope (2006), Black Snake Moan (2006), Speed Racer (2008), Bel Ami (2012), and The Matrix Resurrections (2021).

On television, Ricci played Liza Bump on the final season of Ally McBeal (2002) and had a guest role on Grey's Anatomy in 2006, for which she received an Emmy Award nomination. She also starred on Pan Am (2011–2012), produced and starred in the series The Lizzie Borden Chronicles (2015) and Z: The Beginning of Everything (2017), and appeared as Marilyn Thornhill on the first and second seasons of Wednesday (2022–present). Ricci has played Misty Quigley on Yellowjackets since 2021, receiving nominations for the Primetime Emmy Award and Golden Globe Award for Best Supporting Actress. She voiced Catwoman / Selina Kyle in the animated series Batman: Caped Crusader (2024).

In 2010, Ricci made her Broadway debut in the Donald Margulies play Time Stands Still. She is the national spokesperson for the Rape, Abuse & Incest National Network (RAINN).

== Early life and education ==
Ricci was born in Santa Monica, California on February 12, 1980, the youngest of four children of Sarah Murdoch and Ralph Ricci. Her father had a varied career, including jobs as a gym teacher, lawyer, drug counselor, and primal scream therapist. Ricci has referred to her father as a "failed cult leader." Her mother worked as a Ford Agency model during the 1960s and later became a real estate agent. Regarding her surname, Ricci has stated that she has Italian, Irish, and Scottish ancestry.

Ricci's family moved to Montclair, New Jersey, where she attended Edgemont Elementary School, Glenfield Middle School, Montclair High School, and Morristown–Beard School. She later attended the Professional Children's School in New York City. Ricci's parents separated when she was a preteen. In interviews she has been vocal about her childhood, particularly her parents' divorce and her turbulent relationship with her father.

== Career ==
=== 1990–1996: Discovery, child stardom and teen stardom ===
At the age of eight, Ricci was discovered by a local theater critic when she starred in a school production of The Twelve Days of Christmas. Another child was originally cast in the part, but Ricci devised a plan to secure the role for herself: she taunted her rival so much that he punched her. When she told on him, he lost the part. She later recalled, "I've always been a really ambitious person. I guess that's the first time it really reared its ugly head". Soon thereafter, she featured in a pair of spoof commercials on Saturday Night Live. The first of these featured Ricci at a birthday party in which biomedical waste fell out of a burst piñata, parodying the real-life dumping of waste in the rivers of the East Coast. This gained Ricci her SAG-AFTRA card.

Ricci's film debut was in Mermaids (1990), where she played Kate Flax. She also appeared in the music video for "The Shoop Shoop Song", which featured on the film's soundtrack. She portrayed the morbidly precocious Wednesday Addams in the following year's The Addams Family, Barry Sonnenfeld's big-budget adaptation of the cartoon of the same name, and reprised the role for its 1993 follow-up, Addams Family Values. Both films were financially profitable, grossing over US$300 million between them. Critics singled out Ricci's performance as a particular highlight of Values, with Variety believing she brought "a depth to her character well beyond her years".

Ricci took on her first leading role when she headlined Casper, a supernatural comedy based on the Harvey Comics cartoon character. The film received a mixed critical reception, but was the eighth highest-grossing release of 1995. That same year, she starred in the children's adventure movie Gold Diggers: The Secret of Bear Mountain and played tomboy Roberta in the coming-of-age drama Now and Then. The latter is often cited as the "female alternative" to Stand by Me and has gained a sizeable cult following since its release. Ricci then played a supporting role in Bastard Out of Carolina (1996), the directorial debut of Anjelica Huston, whom she previously worked with on the Addams Family movies. Based on the semi-autobiographical novel by Dorothy Allison, the film received acclaim for its sensitive handling of disturbing themes.

=== 1997–2004: Transition to adult roles ===
In 1997, Ricci starred in the Disney remake of That Darn Cat, which was a moderate success at the box office. Later that year, she made a shift into "legitimate adult roles" with her portrayal of the troubled, sexually curious Wendy Hood in Ang Lee's The Ice Storm, a drama about dysfunctional family relationships. The part was originally given to Natalie Portman, who pulled out when her parents decided that the material was too provocative. In his review for Rolling Stone, Peter Travers wrote, "The sight of the [film's] young stars ... fiddling with each other may shock '90s prudes, but Lee handles these moments with dry wit and compassion ... The adolescent members of the cast do their characters proud, with Ricci a particular standout. Her wonderfully funny and touching performance, capturing the defiance and confusion that come with puberty, is the film's crowning glory".

Ricci made a brief appearance in Terry Gilliam's offbeat road movie, Fear and Loathing in Las Vegas (1998). That same year, she had starring roles in three features: firstly, Buffalo '66, with Roger Ebert describing her portrayal of abductee Layla as "astonishing". Next up was John Waters' satirical comedy Pecker, where she played a hard-nosed laundromat worker, followed by Don Roos' dark comedy-drama The Opposite of Sex, where she headlined as the acid-tongued, manipulative Dede. For the latter, Ricci garnered critical acclaim and was nominated for the 1999 Golden Globe Award for Best Actress. In his review of The Opposite of Sex for Variety, Todd McCarthy described Ricci's portrayal of Dede as "deadly funny" and felt that she delivered her dialogue with "the skill of a prospective Bette Davis". Several years later, Entertainment Weekly singled out her performance as one of the biggest "Oscar snubs" of all time.

In 1999, Ricci headlined the Tim Burton gothic horror film Sleepy Hollow, which reunited her with Fear and Loathing in Las Vegas co-star Johnny Depp, receiving the Saturn Award for Best Actress for her portrayal of Katrina Van Tassel. She appeared as the guest host of Saturday Night Live in December that same year, performing parodies of Britney Spears and the Olsen twins. The episode drew attention due to Ricci unintentionally punching Ana Gasteyer in the face during one of the sketches. Other film appearances around this time included the New Year's Eve-set ensemble comedy 200 Cigarettes (1999); supernatural horror film Bless the Child (2000), where she played the drug-addicted Cheri; and The Man Who Cried (2000), in which she co-starred as a Jewish girl fleeing Soviet Russia. Critic Elvis Mitchell described her as "transfixing" in Cried, while Rolling Stone felt that her "dark-eyed loveliness" conveyed a "lifetime of sadness". In 2001, Ricci headlined Prozac Nation, an independent drama based on Elizabeth Wurtzel's best-selling memoir. The film—Ricci's first outing as a producer—received mixed reviews, but critics agreed that Ricci was the highlight, with Ed Gonzalez of Slant Magazine describing her as "splendid".

Ricci's next role was in The Laramie Project, a drama based on the murder of Matthew Shepard. The 2002 film, which premiered on HBO, received positive reviews from critics; TV Guide's Matt Roush praised the performances of the cast, while noting that the film's examination of homophobia could "enlighten" viewers. Later that year, she co-starred in the comedic British thriller Miranda and guest-starred on the fifth and final season of Ally McBeal, appearing as attorney Liza Bump in seven episodes. Meanwhile, she produced and starred in Pumpkin (2002), a black comedy about the relationship between a disabled young man and a sorority girl. In his review for The Chicago Sun-Times, Roger Ebert wrote, "Pumpkin is alive, and takes chances, and uses the wicked blade of satire in order to show up the complacent political correctness of other movies in [its genre]. It refuses to play it safe. And there is courage in the performances—for example ... the way Ricci sails fearlessly into the risky material".

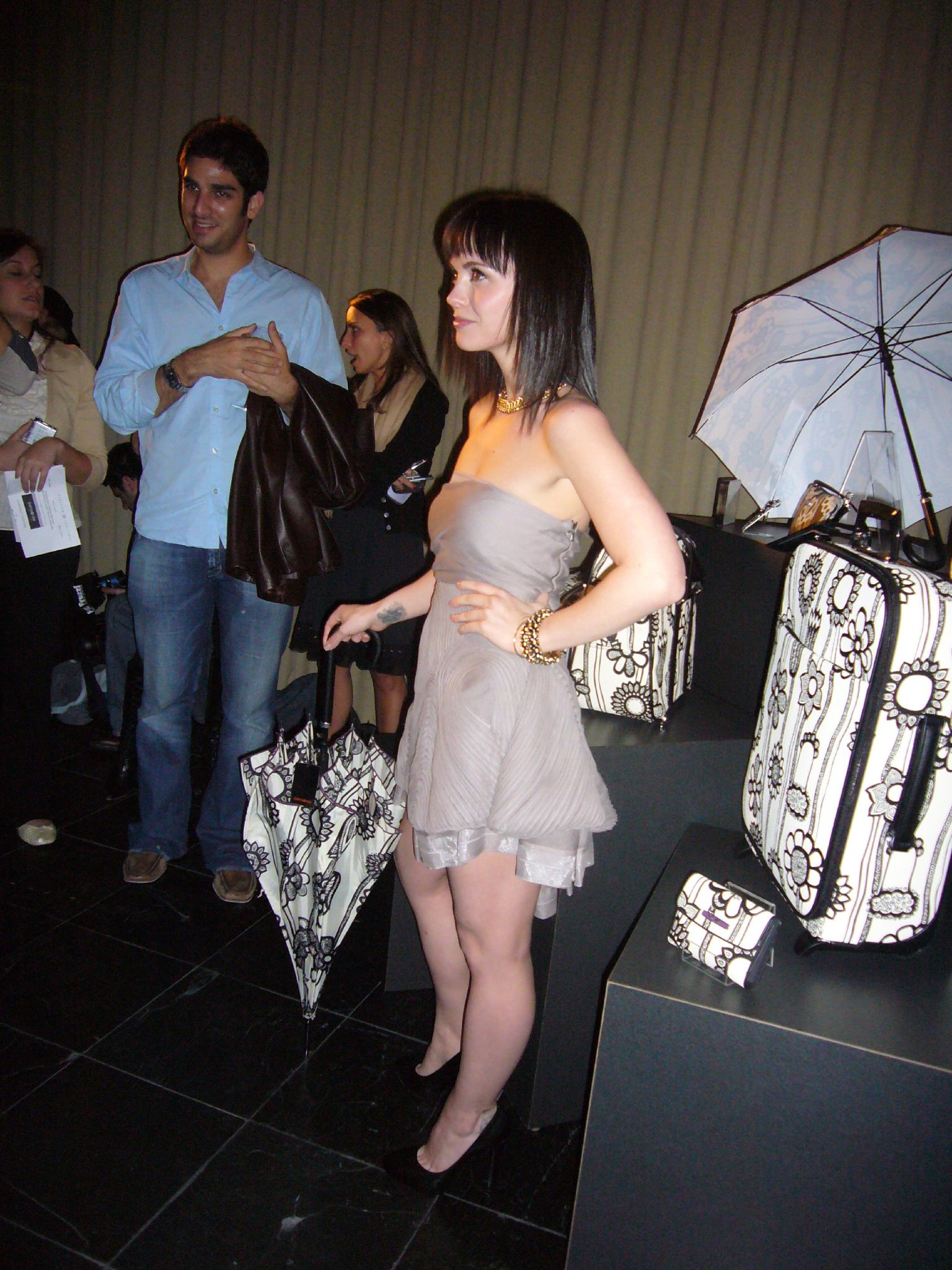
Ricci at the Gramercy Park Hotel, 2007

In 2003, Ricci took on the roles of a young amnesiac wandering through England on foot in the British horror film The Gathering; the former girlfriend of an up-and-coming movie star in Adam Goldberg's I Love Your Work; and that of a vain, vindictive love interest in Woody Allen's Anything Else. In his review of the latter, A. O. Scott of The New York Times described the film as an "antiromantic comedy" and said that Ricci played her role with "feral, neurotic glee".

Next, Ricci co-starred in the biographical crime drama Monster (2003). Her character—Selby Wall—was a fictionalized version of Tyria Moore, the real-life girlfriend of serial killer Aileen Wuornos, played by Charlize Theron. Speaking of her decision to take the part, Ricci said it posed a challenge as it "goes completely against who I am [as a person]". She described the filming experience as "dark and depressing". The film was directed by Patty Jenkins and received rave reviews upon its release, with most critics directing their attention toward Theron, who went on to receive an Academy Award for her portrayal of Wuornos. She acknowledged Ricci during her acceptance speech, calling her the film's "unsung hero". Of Ricci's performance, Roger Ebert said:

[She] finds the correct note for Selby Wall – so correct some critics have mistaken it for bad acting, when in fact it is sublime acting in its portrayal of a bad actor. She plays Selby as clueless, dim, in over her head, picking up cues from moment to moment, cobbling her behavior out of notions borrowed from bad movies, old songs, and barroom romances. Selby must have walked into a gay bar for the first time only a few weeks ago, and studied desperately to figure out how to present herself. Selby and Aileen are often trying to improvise the next line they think the other wants to hear.

=== 2005–2017: Film, television, and theatre roles ===
In 2005, Ricci provided vocals for "Hell Yes", a track from the album Guero by American singer-songwriter Beck. Also that year, she headlined the Wes Craven horror film Cursed, which gained notoriety for its troubled production history. The following year, she appeared as a paramedic in two episodes of Grey's Anatomy, for which she was nominated for an Emmy Award in the category of Outstanding Guest Actress in a Drama Series. Next, she played the title character in Penelope (2006), a rom-com based on the legends of pig-faced women. The role required Ricci to wear a prosthetic nose: "We had a couple different noses that they tested at one point ... this really hideous, awfully unattractive snout [and] then there was this really cute Miss Piggy snout ... we ended up meeting somewhere in the middle". Empire called the film a "lovely fairy tale", while Andrea Gronvall of The Chicago Reader felt it was "a worthy vehicle" for Ricci. Similarly, David Rooney of Variety felt that Ricci gave "the fanciful script more grounding than it might otherwise have had", and critic Eric D. Snider said it was "fun to see her in the most light-hearted role she's played since... well, almost ever".

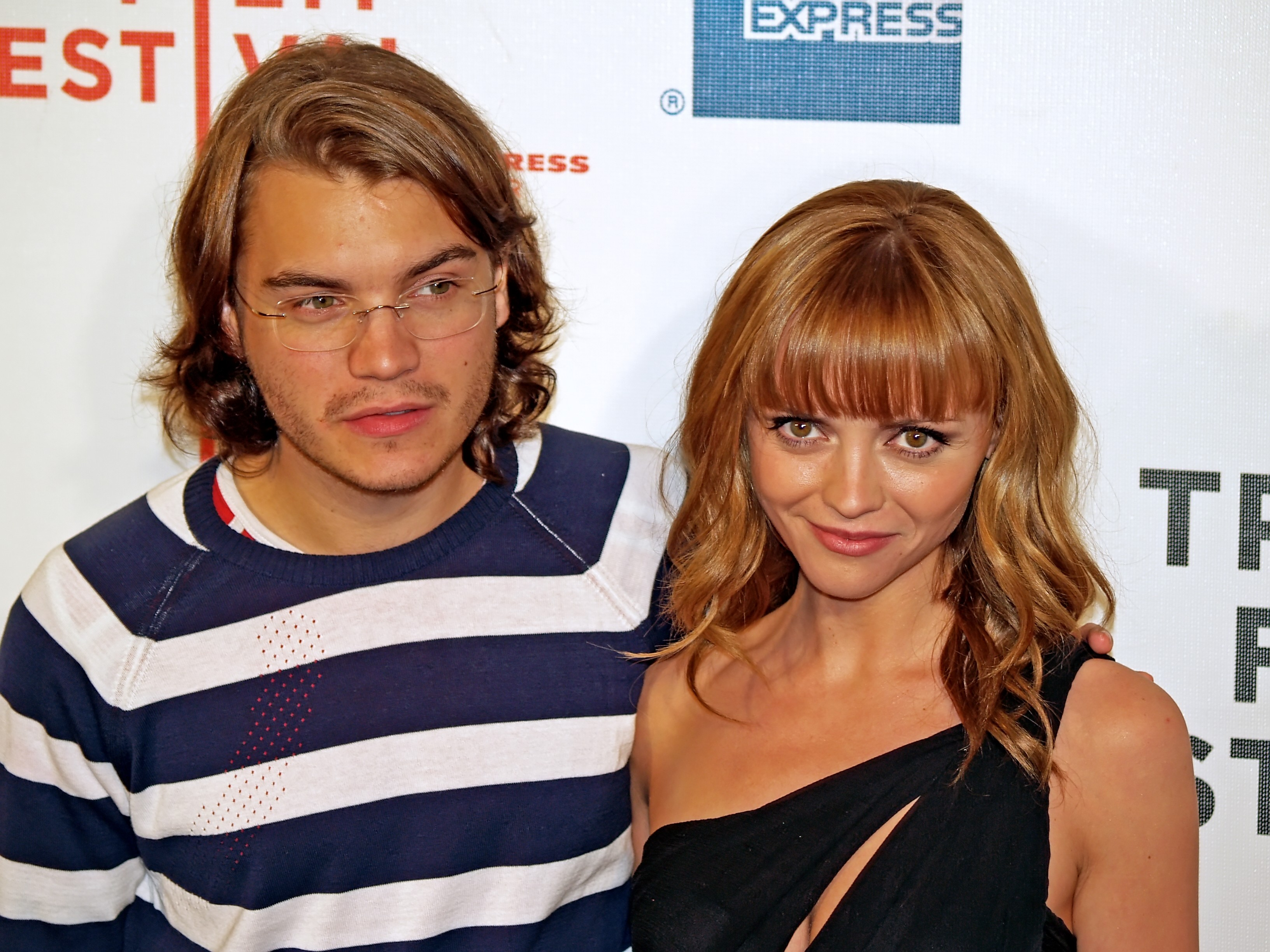
Ricci with Emile Hirsch at the premiere of Speed Racer (2008)

Ricci's portrayal of nymphomaniac Rae Doole in the 2006 drama Black Snake Moan was particularly well received. She lost a significant amount of weight in preparation for the role, in order to make her character look "unhealthy". The film was deemed controversial because of its dark and exploitative themes, but critics felt that Ricci was impressive; writing for Film Comment, Nathan Lee described her performance as "fearless, specific, and blazingly committed", adding, "She's the white-hot focal point of [director] Brewer's loud, brash, encompassing vision". Ricci appeared alongside Jackson for the second time in another 2006 film, Home of the Brave, an ensemble drama following the lives of four soldiers in Iraq and their return to the United States.

Ricci co-starred as love interest Trixie in Speed Racer (2008), a US$120 million adaptation of the Japanese manga series of the same name. Directed by the Wachowskis, it received mixed reviews upon release and was a financial failure; some critics later reappraised it as a masterpiece. That same year, she appeared in a segment of the anthology drama New York, I Love You, directed by Shunji Iwai.

In 2009, Ricci appeared in three episodes of TNT's Saving Grace during its second season, as a detective who teams up with the show's main character. Also that year, she co-starred in the psychological thriller After.Life, with Fangoria stating that she embodied her character—a teacher who dies in a car accident—"in compelling fashion". Next, Ricci made her Broadway debut in Donald Margulies' play Time Stands Still. Her first public performance was on September 23, 2010, at the Cort Theatre. Though she admitted to suffering from extreme bouts of stage fright during the show's four-month run, The New York Times described her portrayal of Mandy as "confident" and "appealing".

Ricci played a kindhearted waitress in Bucky Larson: Born to Be a Star (2011), a comedy written by Adam Sandler. The film was universally panned by critics. Writing for Variety, Andrew Barker called it "one of the most astonishingly unfunny films of this or any other year", but commended Ricci, who he felt gave her role "more than it deserves". From 2011 to 2012, she starred as stewardess Maggie Ryan on the ABC drama series Pan Am, which was set in the 1960s and based on the airline of the same name. The series garnered generally positive reviews, but, due to a decline in viewing figures during its initial run of 14 episodes, the producers decided not to proceed with a second season. In April 2012, Ricci returned to the stage, playing Hermia in an off-Broadway revival of Shakespeare's A Midsummer Night's Dream.

Next, Ricci adopted a British accent when she co-starred as a promiscuous young housewife in Bel Ami (2012), a period drama based on the 1885 novel of the same name. Roger Ebert said in his review, "The surprise for me is Christina Ricci [who] flowers here in warm ripeness. Her character makes the mistake of actually loving Georges. This involves pure acting skill on her part, since Pattinson gives her so little to work with". She headlined the Australian film Around The Block the same year, playing an American drama teacher who befriends an Aboriginal boy during the 2004 Redfern riots. Variety's Joe Leydon described the independent drama as "well-intended yet cliche-ridden", but felt that Ricci brought "allure" to her role. She subsequently provided voices for the animated films The Smurfs 2 (2013) and The Hero of Color City (2014).

In 2014, Ricci played the title character in Lizzie Borden Took an Ax, a Lifetime film inspired by the true story of Borden, who was tried and acquitted of the murders of her father and stepmother in 1892. She reprised the role in 2015 for The Lizzie Borden Chronicles, which she also produced. The eight-part series was met with generally positive reviews; Jane Borden of Vanity Fair called it "playful, wicked brain candy", adding that "Ricci was born to play [a] 19th-century ax murderer". Writing for The New York Times, Neil Genzlinger described her as "gleeful and ruthless", while Keith Uhlich of The Hollywood Reporter felt that she and co-star Clea DuVall had "a delectable rapport not too far removed from Bette Davis and Joan Crawford at their hag-horror peak in What Ever Happened to Baby Jane?", adding, "There's a winking self-consciousness to [Ricci's] portrayal of Lizzie that works to the character's advantage; she's like an out-of-time avenging angel, a feminist icon (before there were words to describe it) lashing out at patriarchy the only way she knows how". Ricci went on to receive a nomination for the 2016 Screen Actors Guild Award for Outstanding Performance by an Actress in a Miniseries.

In the independent ensemble drama Mothers and Daughters (2016), Ricci played a woman who receives life-changing news from an estranged relative. Her next project was the 2017 Amazon Video miniseries Z: The Beginning of Everything, in which she starred as a fictionalized version of American socialite Zelda Fitzgerald. She also served as a producer on the series, which, she later acknowledged, is how she got the part: "I can tell you that in my experience, I have never, ever been cast in a role like this and I would never get this part normally ... I'm just not seen in that way. There are categories that people fall into … and I was never a romantic lead. Basically, you couldn't get five people in a room to agree that I should be a romantic lead. I could get one person, but there's always more than one person whose opinion matters". Writing for RogerEbert.com, Matt Fagerholm said of Ricci's performance:

Few challenges faced by child actors are more daunting than the ability to rise above precocious type-casting … Ricci has [subsequently] found success … yet [she] remains a largely undervalued actress … The good news about [this series] is that it's arguably [her] finest showcase since 2003's Monster, where her excellent work was dwarfed by that of [co-star] Charlize Theron. Though this series also casts Ricci as the less-famous half of a notorious coupling, the actress gets the title role this time around, and she tackles it with exuberant zest.

=== 2018–present: Film work and Yellowjackets ===
In the 2018 psychological thriller Distorted, Ricci starred as a woman suffering from bipolar disorder. The film received a mixed reception from critics, who cited Ricci's performance as a highlight. Her next film projects were The Matrix Resurrections (2021), in which she re-teamed with the Wachowskis to play a colleague of Thomas Anderson, and the 2022 supernatural thriller Monstrous, where she starred as a mother trying to protect her son from evil forces in 1950s California. In their review of the latter, Screen Rant said of Ricci, "The key to this film's success rests on [her] shoulders … She can play into the darling quaint lifestyle of a 50s woman and then let out a shrill scream of fear and terror that can put most scream queens to shame. But her natural gift is her ability to act with her eyes; a single glance, a slight twitch, or a dead-on stare do more to communicate [her character's] feelings and situation than any piece of dialogue in the script. To that end, Monstrous utilizes [her] talents brilliantly".

For her portrayal of Misty Quigley on the Showtime series Yellowjackets (2021–present), Ricci was nominated for the 2022 Primetime Emmy Award for Outstanding Supporting Actress in a Drama Series. Following the lives of four women who survived a plane crash when they were teenagers, the show has received rave reviews from critics. Commenting on Ricci's performance, Digital Spy's Gabriella Geisinger called it "nuanced and dynamic", adding that it "winds sadness and strength together with ease and is as captivating as it is bananas". On playing Misty, a sadistic healthcare worker and societal "outsider", Ricci said, "People really do connect with that need [she] has that motivates everything, which is to be accepted, to be a part of the group … But what's interesting about this character and what I think these writers do so adeptly is, they show you how badly she wants to be there, and then they show you the reason why she deserves to be kicked out … [also] after years and years of being stepped on and dismissed and not accepted … [she is] very much at a point where she's like, 'Well, no one's ever going to give it to me. So I'm going to fucking take it'".

In March 2022, it was announced that Ricci had been cast in the Tim Burton-directed Netflix series Wednesday, detailing the school years of Wednesday Addams, who Ricci played previously in the 1990s. Ricci appeared as series regular Marilyn Thornhill, a teacher at Nevermore Academy. Speaking of her involvement with the project, she said, "I knew there would be comparison between the old [Addams Family] movies and Wednesday. That's a natural inclination. But the 'who was a better Wednesday?' thing is unreal. I loved being Wednesday. I'm very proud of that role … [but] I also think [series star] Jenna Ortega is amazing. She is so brave, so cool, and really doing the part justice. Wednesday is her part now". A substantial ratings success when it premiered in November 2022, the show received critical acclaim, with Collider saying of Ricci, "[she] plays [Thornhill] so well you can't help but be glued to her every move when she's on-screen". She returned to the role during the show's second season in 2025.

Ricci starred as DC Comics supervillain Harley Quinn in the seven-part podcast series Harley Quinn and The Joker: Sound Mind, released by Spotify in January 2023. In August the same year, she played a frightened homeowner whose bedroom is haunted by a "Doja Devil" in the music video for "Demons", a song by American rapper Doja Cat. Charisma Madarang of Rolling Stone described the video as "stunning", noting its homages to various classic horror films. Next, Ricci starred as a trigger-happy wife in the action comedy feature Guns Up (2025). Her performance was well received, with Film Threat saying of her chemistry with co-star Kevin James, "[They] play off each other very well [and] come across as a loving but frustrated couple. Individually, both actors' natural charisma and comedic timing are on full display". In January 2026, it was announced that she would star and serve as an executive producer in the Peacock series The Astrology House.

== Acting style and reception ==
Ricci has no formal acting training. "People explained things to me in very simple ways when I was a child on set", she said in 2012. "Then as I got older I started understanding things in more complicated ways and [created] my own mind games, methods and rules in my head". She later explained, "It's such a weird, completely internal [thing]. Every actor works in a different way … [Personally] I just take the script and I figure out a way to deliver what needs to be delivered".

Ricci earned a reputation as a goth in the 1990s through her work in the Addams Family films and other portrayals of "dark, quirky" characters. Tim Burton once described her as having an "ambiguous quality": "She looks at you and you get a definite feeling, but you're not quite sure what that feeling is".

Ricci told a journalist in 2022 that casting directors were often reluctant to place her in certain projects when she was younger: "At that time, I did a lot of indies because, in mainstream movies, there was still a lot of leading-lady standards that I didn't fall into". She told NME that same year: "My agents [used to say], 'We have to be so careful you don't become a character actress. If we're not careful, you're going to end up just like Jennifer Jason Leigh'. I was like, [but] 'I like her'. They were so afraid of me not being a leading lady, of me not being sexually attractive to people".

== Personal life ==
Ricci has been open about her past struggles with anxiety and anorexia.

She has eight tattoos: a lion on her right shoulder blade (a reference to The Lion, the Witch and the Wardrobe, a favorite novel of hers as a child); an Edward Gorey figure on the inside of her right wrist; a pair of praying hands on her left hip (this tattoo was originally a bat); the name "Jack" on her right thigh for a deceased pet; a sparrow on her right breast; and a mermaid on her left ankle. She also has the words "Move or Bleed" on the left side of her rib cage, as well as a bouquet of sweet peas on her lower back.

Ricci is listed in several art publications as one of artist Mark Ryden's muses. Her image has appeared in several of his oil paintings and sketches.

=== Relationships and family ===
Ricci began dating comedian and actor Owen Benjamin in 2008 after they met on the set of the film All's Faire in Love. They became engaged in March 2009, but ended the engagement two months later.

In February 2013, Ricci announced her engagement to dolly grip James Heerdegen, whom she met while working on the series Pan Am in 2012. They married on October 26, 2013, in Manhattan. They have a son, born in August 2014. On July 2, 2020, Ricci filed for divorce. In her divorce filing, Ricci stated that she was subjected to "severe physical and emotional abuse" by Heerdegen and that "many of these acts of abuse" took place in front of their son. The Los Angeles Police Department had previously responded to a call at Ricci and Heerdegen's Woodland Hills home on June 25, 2020. Heerdegen was not arrested, but Ricci was granted an emergency protective order against Heerdegen the day before she filed for divorce. The order prohibited any contact between the couple. In January 2021, Ricci was granted a Domestic Abuse Restraining Order against Heerdegen. In April 2021, Ricci was granted full custody of their son, while Heerdegen was given visitation rights.

In October 2021, Ricci announced her marriage to hairstylist Mark Hampton. Their daughter was born in December 2021.

=== Activism ===
Ricci has been the national spokesperson for the Rape, Abuse & Incest National Network (RAINN) since April 25, 2007. She wrote an article for The Huffington Post in 2009, where she spoke about how her work with the organisation had affected her: "[Victims] tell me of the struggles they face every day", she said, "and the hurdles they've had to overcome."

Due to public backlash after PETA named Ricci on their "Worst Dressed" list in 2006 for wearing reindeer fur on the cover of W, Ricci announced that she would stop wearing animal fur altogether. In response, PETA removed her from the list.

== Filmography ==
=== Film ===
Christina Ricci' film credits
Year	Title	Role	Notes
1990	Mermaids	Kate Flax	
1991	The Hard Way	Bonnie	
1991	The Addams Family	Wednesday Addams	
1993	The Cemetery Club	Jessica	
1993	Addams Family Values	Wednesday Addams	
1995	Casper	Kathleen "Kat" Harvey	
1995	Now and Then	Roberta Martin	
1995	Gold Diggers: The Secret of Bear Mountain	Beth Easton	
1996	Bastard Out of Carolina	Dee Dee	
1996	The Last of the High Kings	Erin	
1997	Little Red Riding Hood	Little Red Riding Hood	Short film
1997	That Darn Cat	Patti Randall	
1997	The Ice Storm	Wendy Hood	
1998	The Opposite of Sex	Dede Truitt	
1998	Buffalo '66	Layla	
1998	Fear and Loathing in Las Vegas	Lucy	
1998	Small Soldiers	Gwendy Doll	Voice
1998	Pecker	Shelley	
1998	I Woke Up Early the Day I Died	Teenage Hooker	
1998	Desert Blue	Ely Jackson	
1999	200 Cigarettes	Val	
1999	No Vacancy	Lillian	
1999	Sleepy Hollow	Katrina Van Tassel	
2000	Bless the Child	Cheri Post	
2000	The Man Who Cried	Suzie	
2001	All Over the Guy	Rayna Wyckoff	
2001	Prozac Nation	Elizabeth Wurtzel	
2002	Pumpkin	Carolyn McDuffy	Also producer
2002	Miranda	Miranda	
2003	The Gathering	Cassie Grant	
2003	Anything Else	Amanda Chase	
2003	I Love Your Work	Shana	
2003	Monster	Selby Wall	
2005	Cursed	Ellie Myers	
2006	Penelope	Penelope Wilhern	
2006	Black Snake Moan	Rae Doole	
2006	Home of the Brave	Sarah Schivino	
2008	Speed Racer	Trixie	
2008	New York, I Love You	Camille	Segment: "Shunji Iwai"
2009	All's Faire in Love	Kate	
2009	After.Life	Anna Taylor	
2010	Alpha and Omega	Lilly	Voice
2011	California Romanza	Lena	Short film
2011	Bucky Larson: Born to Be a Star	Kathy McGee	
2012	Bel Ami	Clotilde de Marelle	
2012	War Flowers	Sarabeth Ellis	
2013	The Smurfs 2	Vexy	Voice
2013	Around the Block	Dino Chalmers	
2014	The Hero of Color City	Yellow	Voice
2016	Mothers and Daughters	Rebecca	
2017	Teen Titans: The Judas Contract	Terra	Voice
2018	Distorted	Lauren Curran	
2020	10 Things We Should Do Before We Break Up	Abigail	
2020	Percy	Rebecca Salcau	
2020	Here After	Scarlett	
2021	The Matrix Resurrections	Gwyn de Vere	
2022	Monstrous	Laura	
2024	Child Star	Herself	
2024	Sonic the Hedgehog 3	Kathleen "Kat" Harvey	Archive footage from Casper
2025	Guns Up	Alice Hayes	
2026	The Dresden Sun	Dr. Dresden Corliss	
2027	Unplugged †	Kit / Ivana Viktimn	Voice; in production

=== Television ===
Christina Ricci' television credits
Year	Title	Role	Notes
1990	H.E.L.P.	Olivia	Episode: "Are You There, Alpha Centauri?"
1996	The Simpsons	Erin (voice)	Episode: "Summer of 4 Ft. 2"
1998	Bug City	Herself (host)	Main role; 13 episodes
1999	Saturday Night Live	Herself (host)	Episode: "Christina Ricci/Beck"
2002	The Laramie Project	Romaine Patterson	Television film
2002	Malcolm in the Middle	Kelly Jacobson	Episode: "Company Picnic: Part 1"
2002	Ally McBeal	Liza Bump	7 episodes
2005	Joey	Mary Teresa	Episode: "Joey and the Fancy Sister"
2006	Grey's Anatomy	Hannah Davies	Episodes: "It's the End of the World", "As We Know It"
2009	Saving Grace	Offcr. Abby Charles	3 episodes
2011–2012	Pan Am	Margaret "Maggie" Ryan	Main role; 14 episodes
2012	The Good Wife	Therese Dodd	Episode: "Anatomy of a Joke"
2014	Lizzie Borden Took an Ax	Lizzie Borden	Television film
2015	The Lizzie Borden Chronicles	Lizzie Borden	Main role and executive producer; 8 episodes
2017	Z: The Beginning of Everything	Zelda Fitzgerald	Main role and executive producer; 10 episodes
2019	Escaping the Madhouse: The Nellie Bly Story	Nellie Bly	Television film
2020	50 States of Fright	Bitsy	Episode: "Red Rum"
2021	Rick and Morty	Princess Poñeta / Kathy Ireland (voice)	Episode: "Rickdependence Spray"
2021–present	Yellowjackets	Adult Misty Quigley	Main role; 29 episodes
2022; 2025	Wednesday	Marilyn Thornhill / Laurel Gates	Main role (Season 1); Guest (Season 2); 10 episodes
2024	Batman: Caped Crusader	Catwoman / Selina Kyle (voice)	Episode: "Kiss of the Catwoman"
2026	RuPaul's Drag Race All Stars	Herself (Guest Judge)	Season 11, Episode 3

Key
†	Denotes works that have not yet been released

=== Other works ===
Music

- 2005: "Hell Yes" – Beck

Music video

- 1990: "The Shoop Shoop Song (It's in His Kiss)" – Cher
- 1991: "Addams Groove" – MC Hammer
- 1993: "Addams Family (Whoomp!)" – Tag Team
- 2000: "Natural Blues" – Moby
- 2023: "Demons" – Doja Cat

Video game

- 2008: The Legend of Spyro: Dawn of the Dragon as Cynder
- 2008: Speed Racer: The Videogame as Trixie

Audiobook

- 2005: Gossip Girl – Narrator
- 2005: Gossip Girl: You Know You Love Me – Narrator
- 2012: Little Women – Narrator

Scripted podcast

- 2023: Harley Quinn and The Joker: Sound Mind as Harleen Quinzel

== Awards and nominations ==
Selected accolades for Christina Ricci
Year	Association	Category	Nominated work	Result	Ref.
1990	Young Artist Awards	Best Young Supporting Actress	Mermaids	Won	
1991	Fangoria Chainsaw Awards	Best Young Supporting Actress	The Addams Family	Won	
1992	Chicago Film Critics Association	Most Promising Actress	The Addams Family	Nominated	
1993	Saturn Awards	Best Performance by a Younger Actor	The Addams Family	Nominated	
1994	Saturn Awards	Best Performance by a Younger Actor	Addams Family Values	Nominated	
1995	YoungStar Awards	Best Young Actress in a Comedy Film	Casper	Won	
1995	ShoWest Convention	Star of the Year	Herself	Won	
1996	Saturn Awards	Best Performance by a Younger Actor	Casper	Won	
1997	Online Film & Television Association	Best Supporting Actress in a Motion Picture or Miniseries	Bastard Out of Carolina	Nominated	
1998	Chlotrudis Awards	Best Supporting Actress	The Ice Storm	Nominated	
1998	National Board of Review	Best Supporting Actress	Buffalo '66	Won	
1998	Nickelodeon Kids' Choice Awards	Favorite Movie Actress	That Darn Cat	Nominated	
1998	Online Film & Television Association	Best Supporting Actress	The Ice Storm	Nominated	
1998	Seattle International Film Festival	Best Actress	The Opposite of Sex	Won	
1998	YoungStar Awards	Best Young Actress in a Drama Film	The Ice Storm	Nominated	
1998	YoungStar Awards	Best Young Actress in a Comedy Film	The Opposite of Sex	Won	
1999	American Comedy Awards	Funniest Actress in a Motion Picture	The Opposite of Sex	Nominated	
1999	Chlotrudis Awards	Best Actress	The Opposite of Sex	Nominated	
1999	Florida Film Critics Circle	Best Supporting Actress	Buffalo '66	Won	
1999	Golden Globe Awards	Best Actress – Motion Picture Comedy or Musical	The Opposite of Sex	Nominated	
1999	Independent Spirit Awards	Best Female Lead	The Opposite of Sex	Nominated	
1999	Online Film & Television Association	Best Actress – Comedy/Musical	The Opposite of Sex	Won	
1999	Satellite Awards	Best Actress – Motion Picture	The Opposite of Sex	Won	
1999	Toronto Film Critics Association	Best Performance – Female	The Opposite of Sex	Nominated	
2000	B-Movie Film Festival	Best Celebrity Cameo	I Woke Up Early the Day I Died	Won	
2000	Blockbuster Entertainment Awards	Favorite Actress – Horror	Sleepy Hollow	Won	
2000	Saturn Awards	Best Actress	Sleepy Hollow	Won	
2001	Blockbuster Entertainment Awards	Favorite Supporting Actress – Suspense	Bless the Child	Won	
2002	Teen Choice Awards	Choice Actress – Comedy	Pumpkin	Nominated	
2004	Las Vegas Film Critics Society	Best Supporting Actress	Monster	Nominated	
2004	MTV Movie Awards	Best Kiss (shared with Charlize Theron)	Monster	Nominated	
2006	Online Film & Television Association	Best Guest Actress in a Drama Series	Grey's Anatomy	Nominated	
2006	Primetime Emmy Awards	Outstanding Guest Actress in a Drama Series	Grey's Anatomy	Nominated	
2008	Teen Choice Awards	Choice Actress – Action/Adventure	Speed Racer	Nominated	
2016	Screen Actors Guild Awards	Outstanding Actress in a Miniseries or Television Movie	The Lizzie Borden Chronicles	Nominated	
2020	Women's Image Network Awards	Outstanding Actress – Made for Television Movie/Miniseries	Escaping the Madhouse: The Nellie Bly Story	Nominated	
2022	Dorian Awards	Best Supporting TV Performance	Yellowjackets	Nominated	
2022	Fantaspoa International Fantastic Film Festival	Best Actress	Monstrous	Won	
2022	Gold Derby Awards	Supporting Actress – Drama	Yellowjackets	Nominated	
2022	Hollywood Critics Association	Best Supporting Actress in a Series – Drama	Yellowjackets	Nominated	
2022	Online Film & Television Association	Best Supporting Actress in a Drama Series	Yellowjackets	Nominated	
2022	Primetime Emmy Awards	Outstanding Supporting Actress in a Drama Series	Yellowjackets	Nominated	
2023	Critics' Choice Super Awards	Best Actress in a Horror Series	Wednesday	Nominated	
2023	MTV Movie Awards	Best Performance in a Show	Yellowjackets	Nominated	
2023	Hollywood Critics Association	Best Supporting Actress in a Series – Drama	Yellowjackets	Nominated	
2023	Hollywood Critics Association	Best Supporting Actress in a Series – Comedy	Wednesday	Won	
2024	Golden Globe Awards	Best Supporting Actress – Series, Miniseries or Television Film	Yellowjackets	Nominated	
2024	Critics' Choice Television Awards	Best Supporting Actress in a Drama Series	Yellowjackets	Nominated	
2024	Satellite Awards	Best Supporting Actress – Series, Miniseries or Television Film	Yellowjackets	Won	
2025	Hollywood Walk of Fame	Motion Pictures Star	Herself	Won	
