= Lizzie Borden Took an Ax =

2014 American television biopic

- Official poster
- Genre: Docudrama; Slasher; Mystery; Biopic
- Written by: Stephen Kay
- Directed by: Nick Gomez
- Starring: Christina Ricci; Clea DuVall; Billy Campbell
- Theme music composer: Tree Adams
- Country of origin: United States
- Original language: English

Production
- Producer: Michael Mahoney
- Cinematography: Steve Cosens
- Editor: Henk Van Eeghan
- Running time: 87 minutes
- Production company: Sony Pictures Television

Original release
- Network: Lifetime
- Release: January 25, 2014

Related
- The Lizzie Borden Chronicles

Lizzie Borden Took an Ax is a 2014 American biographical drama television film about Lizzie Borden, a young American woman tried and acquitted of the August 4, 1892, axe murders of her father and stepmother in Fall River, Massachusetts. It premiered on Lifetime on January 25, 2014, and starred Christina Ricci in the title role. The film was so successful it was followed by a miniseries, The Lizzie Borden Chronicles, which aired from April to May 2015. Ricci has described the film and its follow-up as being "self-aware, campy, and tongue-in-cheek".

== Plot ==
In August 1892, Fall River, Massachusetts Sunday school teacher Lizzie Borden comes across the terrible murder scene of her father Andrew, who had been brutally killed with a hatchet. Local law enforcement arrives, also discovering the body of Abby Borden, the stepmother of Lizzie and her older sister Emma. As the case progresses, the evidence seems to point to Lizzie as the prime suspect. Her lawyer, Andrew Jennings, maintains that a woman could not commit such a cruel and gruesome crime. Still, Lizzie is put on trial for the murders, and the case makes headlines in newspapers throughout the country, which call it the most infamous of the century.

Eventually, the jury finds Lizzie not guilty of all charges. Despite the acquittal, she has become the town pariah. During a final confrontation between Lizzie and Emma, the former asks her sister if she wants to know the truth. Lizzie then whispers into Emma's ear as a series of flashbacks show Lizzie committing the murders. A visibly upset Emma leaves the room, and eventually, moves out of their home, never seeing Lizzie again. Lizzie walks outside and hears three children jump roping to the famous nursery rhyme: "Lizzie Borden took an axe/She gave her mother forty whacks/When she saw what she had done/She gave her father forty-one."

== Cast ==
- Christina Ricci as Lizzie Borden
- Clea DuVall as Emma Borden
- Billy Campbell as Andrew Jennings
- John Maclaren as Rev. Edwin A. Buck
- Shawn Doyle as Marshal Hilliard
- Andria Wilson as Nance O'Neil
- Sara Botsford as Abby Durfee Borden
- Gregg Henry as Hosea M. Knowlton
- Stephen McHattie as Andrew Borden
- Hannah Anderson as Bridget Sullivan
- Andrea Runge as Alice Russell

== Tagline ==
The teaser trailer featured the time period's popular children's skipping-rope rhyme:

Lizzie Borden took an axe
She gave her mother forty whacks.
When she saw what she had done
She gave her father forty-one.
Lizzie Borden got away
For her crime she did not pay.

== Ratings ==
In its original January 25, 2014, premiere on the Lifetime network, the film was watched by 4.4 million viewers, making it the night's number-one telecast among all key demographics.

== Reception ==
Lizzie Borden Took an Ax received mixed reviews despite praise for Ricci's performance; as of 6 May 2015, based on 14 reviews, the film holds a 43% rating on review aggregator website Rotten Tomatoes.

== Series ==
In October 2014, Lifetime announced plans for an additional limited series based on the film. Originally named Lizzie Borden: The Fall River Chronicles, the series took place after Lizzie's trial. Christina Ricci and Clea DuVall reprised their roles as the Borden sisters. Cole Hauser portrayed Pinkerton detective Charlie Siringo, who investigates other strange occurrences, including murders, centered around the Bordens. Jessy Schram played Lizzie's actress/dancer friend, Nancy O'Keefe, and John Heard played Lizzie's father's business partner, William Almy. The limited series was written by Greg Small, Rich Blaney, Barbara Nance, Jason Grote, and David Simkins. Stephen Kay directed the first two of the episodes, which began airing April 2015.

A teaser trailer aired on December 8, 2014, during the second part of The Red Tent miniseries that was called The Lizzie Borden Chronicles, along with "The series coming in 2015." Despite The Hollywood Reporter stating the series would be a six-hour limited miniseries, on February 5, 2015, it was increased to eight hours.

== See also ==
- Blood Relations
- Fall River Legend
- The Legend of Lizzie Borden
- Lizzie Borden
- Lizzie
