= The Slaughter Rule =

2002 American film by Alex Smith

- Movie poster
- Directed by: Alex Smith; Andrew J. Smith
- Written by: Alex Smith; Andrew J. Smith
- Produced by: Gavin O'Connor; David O. Russell
- Starring: Ryan Gosling; David Morse; Clea Duvall; Kelly Lynch
- Cinematography: Eric Alan Edwards
- Edited by: Brent White
- Music by: Jay Farrar
- Distributed by: Cowboy Pictures
- Release dates: January 11, 2002 (Sundance); January 8, 2003 (United States)
- Running time: 112 minutes
- Country: United States
- Language: English
- Budget: $500,000 (estimated)
- Box office: $13,411

The Slaughter Rule is a 2002 American coming of age sports drama film directed by Alex Smith and Andrew J. Smith and starring Ryan Gosling and David Morse. The film, set in contemporary Montana, explores the relationship between a small-town high school football player (Gosling), and his troubled coach (Morse). The film was nominated for the Grand Jury Prize at the 2002 Sundance Film Festival.

== Plot ==
Roy Chutney is a high school senior in the fictional Montana town of Blue Springs. Roy does not have an especially close relationship with his mother Evangeline and has not seen his father in years. That does not prevent Roy from feeling emotionally devastated when he learns that his father has killed himself, and Roy's self-esteem takes a beating when he is cut from the high school football team shortly afterward. Roy whiles away his time by swilling beer with his best friend, Tracy Two Dogs, and falling into a romance with Skyla, a barmaid at a local tavern, but Roy's short time on the high school gridiron seems to have impressed Gideon Ferguson, a local character who coaches an unsanctioned high school six-man football team when he is not delivering newspapers or trying to score a gig singing country songs at nearby honky-tonks.

Gideon thinks that Roy has potential and asks him to join his team; encouraged by Gideon's belief in him, Roy agrees, and he persuades Tracy and his friend Russ to tag along. While playing hardscrabble six-man football helps restore Roy's self-confidence, he finds it does not answer his questions about his future or his relationship with Skyla. When Gideon's overwhelming interest in Roy begins to lend credence to town rumors that Gideon is gay, Roy starts to wonder just why he was asked to join the team.

== Cast ==
- Ryan Gosling as Roy Chutney
- David Morse as Gideon Ferguson
- Clea DuVall as Skyla Sisco
- Kelly Lynch as Evangeline Chutney
- David Cale as Studebaker
- Eddie Spears as Tracy Two Dogs
- Amy Adams as Doreen
- Ken White as Russ Colfax

== Production ==
Jay Farrar, founder of the alternative country bands Uncle Tupelo and Son Volt, composed the film's musical score. New songs were written and performed by Vic Chesnutt and Freakwater, and existing songs by Ryan Adams, Uncle Tupelo, and the Pernice Brothers were also included.

Filming for the movie largely took place in Great Falls, Montana, and a series of small towns in the Great Falls vicinity.

The title of the film comes from the term "slaughter rule." The unofficial rule provides for an athletic competition's premature conclusion if one team is ahead of the other by a certain number of points prior to game's end. The rule helps to avoid humiliating the losing team further.

== Release ==
The film premiered in January 2002 during the Sundance Film Festival. Later that year, the film entered the South by Southwest Film Festival and the AFI Film Festival. It went into limited release nationwide beginning January 2003.

=== Critical reception ===
On review aggregator website Rotten Tomatoes, the film has an approval rating of 74% based on 31 reviews, and an average rating of 5.9/10. The website's critical consensus reads, "A bleak but original indie, The Slaughter Rule benefits from outstanding performances by Ryan Gosling and David Morse." On Metacritic, the film has a weighted average score of 65 out of 100, based on 13 critics, indicating "generally favorable reviews".

While the performances by Morse and Gosling were generally received positively, some reviews of the film criticized the script. Reviewing the film for The New York Times, Stephen Holden praised the performances of Gosling and Morse, but opined that the film is "confused" and "doesn't have much dramatic momentum". In her review for the Los Angeles Times, Manohla Dargis praised the film's cinematography but wrote that although the film has the virtue of sincerity, the story is "over-explained".

Joe Leydon of Variety claimed the script "plays like a first draft". However, Marjorie Baumgarten of The Austin Chronicle thought that the "writing and directing team of twin brothers Alex and Andrew Smith have made an astonishingly good first feature". J. R. Jones, writing in Chicago Reader, described the film as "powerful" and especially praised David Morse's performance.

=== Accolades ===
The film received the FIPRESCI Prize at the 2002 Stockholm Film Festival and the Milagro Award at the 2002 Santa Fe Film Festival. The film was also nominated for the John Cassavetes Award at the 2003 Film Independent Spirit Awards and the Grand Jury Prize at the 2002 Sundance Film Festival.

== See also ==
- List of American football films
