= Monstrous (film) =

2022 American supernatural thriller film

- Theatrical release poster
- Directed by: Chris Sivertson
- Written by: Carol Chrest
- Produced by: Robert Yocum; Sasha Yelaun; B.I. Rosen; Johnny Remo; Sean Reilly
- Starring: Christina Ricci; Colleen Camp; Lew Temple; Nick Vallelonga; Santino Barnard
- Cinematography: Senda Bonnet
- Edited by: Anjoum Agrama
- Music by: Tim Rutili
- Production companies: Chicken Soup for the Soul Entertainment; Film Mode Entertainment; Saban Films; High Octane Pictures; Red Coral Productions; Burning Sky Films; Wildfire Pictures; SkipStone Pictures
- Distributed by: Screen Media
- Release dates: March 12, 2022 (Glasgow Film Festival); May 13, 2022 (United States)
- Running time: 88 minutes
- Country: United States
- Language: English

Monstrous is a 2022 American supernatural thriller film directed by Chris Sivertson, written by Carol Chrest, and starring Christina Ricci. The film premiered at the Glasgow Film Festival on March 12, 2022. It was released in the United States on May 13, 2022, by Screen Media.

== Plot ==
In the 1950s, Laura and her seven-year-old son Cody drive to a remote home in California to flee from her abusive ex-husband. The family is threatened by the possibility of his return and the presence of a monster lurking in a nearby lake.

They settle in. She sends her son to school, makes lunch for him, and works at a company doing a typing job. Her son seems frightened because some entity from the nearby lake lurks around his room at night. But after a direct encounter with that monster, he seems comfortable with it and calls it "pretty lady from the lake." Still, he wants to go home. He always seems sad and depressed and argues with his mom to go back, but she always refuses.

On his birthday, she arranges a party and makes invitations for his classmates. But he says no one will come, even when she insists that he should at least give it a chance. They both decorate their house with balloons, and Laura cooks delicious meals, but no one shows up. Later, Laura discovers that Cody never handed out the invitations; he says he knew no one would come.

Laura encounters the monster from the pond herself, begins drinking, and quits her job. Then she goes to school to pick up her son, but he is nowhere to be seen. She asks a police officer for help.

At the police station, a lady asks Laura to recall the accident that happened to her son last year. Laura says she was out for groceries, and her husband was looking after their son, but Cody fell into the pool. When she came back, he was still there, so she jumped in the pool and tried to save him, and paramedics arrived. She insists that they revived her son and that he was alright, then asks for water and leaves the police station.

When she gets home, she finds Cody waiting for her. He begs her to let him go, as he should leave with the "pretty lady of the lake."

In reality, her son died in the accident, but she was unable to cope with the grief and became delusional. The year is 2022; the 1950s world was one created in her mind. In the end, we see that the house and car where Laura has been belonged to her deceased Grandma, and she has been living in the world she remembered from her childhood. When "Cody" leaves with "the pretty lady," we see it is Laura's grandmother. She achieves a degree of peace at last. Laura then frees herself from her delusion and leaves the house in California to return to her home.

== Cast ==
- Christina Ricci as Laura
- Santino Barnard as Cody
- Colleen Camp as Mrs. Langtree
- Lew Temple as Mr. Alonzo
- Nick Vallelonga as Legionnaire

== Production ==
Principal photography began in early December 2020. Filming took place in Los Angeles, California, throughout Simi Valley, Sherman Oaks and Altadena. In March 2021, the cast was revealed at the Berlin International Film Festival. In March 2022, Screen Media acquired the distribution rights.

== Release ==
Monstrous premiered in the FrightFest spotlight of the Glasgow Film Festival on March 12, 2022. It was released in theaters and on-demand on May 13, 2022.

== Reception ==
On the review aggregator website Rotten Tomatoes, 55% of 40 critics' reviews are positive. The website's consensus reads: "Christina Ricci is capable of carrying a lot, but even her talents are tested by this often Monstrous-ly dull horror movie." Metacritic, which uses a weighted average, assigned the film a score of 52 out of 100, based on 10 critics, indicating "mixed or average" reviews.

Anna Smith of Deadline praised the performances, score, and soundtrack, writing: "Monstrous is one of those tricky films that play a little slowly, but invites a second viewing after the pay-off. Nonetheless, it's a quietly thought-provoking watch that will resonate with those who connect to its themes."
