= The Lizzie Borden Chronicles =

American television limited series

- Genre: Docudrama; Mystery; Horror
- Based on: Lizzie Borden
- Starring: Christina Ricci; Clea DuVall; Cole Hauser
- Composer: Tree Adams
- Country of origin: United States
- Original language: English
- No. of seasons: 1
- No. of episodes: 8

Production
- Executive producers: Judith Verno; Christina Ricci
- Producers: Michael J. Mahoney; Stanley M. Brooks
- Production locations: Halifax, Nova Scotia, Canada
- Cinematography: Francois Dagenais
- Editors: Ian Silverstein; Lori Jane Coleman
- Running time: 60 minutes
- Production companies: Sony Pictures Television; Peace Out Productions

Original release
- Network: Lifetime
- Release: April 5 – May 24, 2015

Related
- Lizzie Borden Took an Ax

The Lizzie Borden Chronicles is an American television limited series following Lizzie Borden after she is acquitted of the murders of her father and stepmother in 1892. It premiered on Lifetime on Easter Sunday, April 5, 2015, and ended on May 25, 2015. The series is a continuation of the story begun in the network's 2014 film Lizzie Borden Took an Ax and, like the film, is fictionalized and speculative.

== Plot ==
In 1893, four months after Lizzie Borden's acquittal for the murders of her father and stepmother, she and her sister Emma try to start a new life despite financial troubles and Lizzie's ruined reputation. Meanwhile, Pinkerton detective Charlie Siringo arrives in Fall River, Massachusetts, to investigate the case for himself.

== Cast ==
=== Main ===
- Christina Ricci as Lizzie Borden
- Clea DuVall as Emma Borden
- Cole Hauser as Charlie Siringo

=== Recurring ===
- Olivia Llewellyn as Isabel Danforth
- John Ralston as Ezekiel Danforth
- Dylan Taylor as Officer Leslie Trotwood
- Bradley Stryker as Skipjack
- Jeff Wincott as Marshal Hilliard
- Jessy Schram as Nance O'Keefe
- Rhys Coiro as Chester Phipps
- Adrian G. Griffiths as Fredrick Lowell
- Chris Bauer as Tom Horn
- Matthew Le Nevez as Bat Masterson

=== Guest ===
- John Heard as William Almy
- Andrew Howard as William Borden
- Michael Ironside as Warren Stark
- Kimberly-Sue Murray as Adele
- Jonathan Banks as Mr. Flowers
- Frank Chiesurin as Spencer Cavanaugh
- Ronan Vibert as Dr. Vose
- Michelle Fairley as Aideen Trotwood

== Episodes ==
No.	Title	Directed by	Written by	Original release date	Viewers (millions)
1	"Acts of Borden"	Stephen Kay	Gregory Small & Richard Blaney	April 5, 2015	1.14
Four months after Lizzie Borden's murder trial and acquittal, Lizzie and her older sister Emma try to get on with their lives despite being shunned by all society in 1893 Fall River. However, an overwhelming debt by their late father to William Almy, a lawyer friend of Mr. Borden, and a greedy, unpredictable career-criminal half-brother named William threaten Lizzie and Emma's future when William finds a box in the basement of the Borden house containing the skeleton of a long-dead baby. Meanwhile, Pinkerton agent Charlie Siringo arrives in Fall River with an interest in Lizzie's case. Also, Lizzie tries to talk to Emma about purchasing a new house to live in away from their old one where their father and stepmother were murdered.
2	"Patron of the Arts"	Stephen Kay	Gregory Small & Richard Blaney	April 12, 2015	0.99
During a trip to New York, Lizzie helps and takes in a street prostitute named Adele who soon shows a grateful and romantic interest in Lizzie. At the same time, Lizzie is also pursued by playwright Spencer Cavanaugh, who is seeking her patronage. Meanwhile, Siringo investigates the two newest deaths surrounding Lizzie, who are her trouble making half brother William 'Billy' Borden, and William Almy, the man to whom she owed a fortune, but his theories fall on deaf ears with Hilliard. Lizzie also discovers that Siringo is on her tail and makes a veiled threat against him.
3	"Flowers"	Russell Mulcahy	Barbara Nance	April 19, 2015	0.72
Lizzie plans a party at the new mansion but finds herself the victim of an extortion from Adele's pimp, Skipjack, who is working on behalf of crime lord Mr. Flowers. Meanwhile, Spencer's disappearance raises suspicion, and skittish Adele becomes a liability for Lizzie. Siringo's secret employer is revealed to be Emma, who fires him for stirring up more trouble for Lizzie rather than exonerating her as intended. Siringo, already theorizing about Lizzie's involvement with Spencer, is hired by the missing man's sister, Nance, to investigate. Also, Lizzie finds a way to neutralize both Mr. Flowers and Adele.
4	"Welcome to Maplecroft"	Russell Mulcahy	Jason Grote	April 26, 2015	0.80
Emma and Officer Trotwood romantically get closer as Skipjack demands ongoing payments from Lizzie to keep Spencer's murder a secret. Meanwhile, Lizzie faces off with her neighbor Mrs. Kenney. Also, Siringo is hiding out after surviving the attempt on his life, and Nance takes the investigation of her brother's disappearance into her own hands.
5	"Cold Storage"	Howard Deutch	Jason Grote & Barbara Nance	May 3, 2015	0.82
Nance's death at Lizzie's hands is ruled self-defense, and Hilliard enlists Siringo's help in convicting Lizzie for her many alleged crimes. Meanwhile, Lizzie stays one step ahead by finding where Skipjack secreted Spencer's body and disposing of it. Trotwood proposes marriage to Emma, who accepts. Elsewhere, Siringo and Isabel finally consummate their attraction, with disastrous results.
6	"Fugitive Kind"	Howard Deutch	David Simkins	May 10, 2015	0.58
Siringo is tried and convicted of both Spencer and Isabel's murders. Lizzie's plan to turn Trotwood against Emma fails, so she arranges his murder. A devastated Emma decides to leave town. Siringo escapes while en route to his execution, and shows up at Maplecroft to kill Lizzie for framing him. He nearly succeeds, but Emma appears and stops him... with an axe.
7	"The Sisters Grimke"	Constantine Makris	Gregory Small & Richard Blaney	May 17, 2015	0.77
After disposing of Siringo and Hilliard's bodies, Lizzie has reinvented herself by taking a new name and a new job as a prim schoolteacher in a small town far from Fall River. Emma, traumatized by Siringo's demise at her own hands, sits in a catatonic state at a nearby sanitarium. A pair of local murders jeopardizes Lizzie's new identity, and the sins of Emma's doctor reawaken her. Meanwhile, Siringo's Pinkerton associates Mr. Horn and Mr. Masterson pick up Lizzie's trail.
8	"Capsize"	Constantine Makris	Gregory Small & Richard Blaney & David Simkins	May 24, 2015	0.71
Having escaped from the sanitarium, Emma seeks refuge with the Trotwood family in Boston, and Lizzie is not far behind. Lizzie meets her match in the cold and imperious Aideen Trotwood as Horn and Masterson arrive in search of the Bordens. Lizzie manipulates the Trotwoods to get Emma back and sets in motion a plan to eliminate the Pinkerton men, but the final results of her actions are not what she expected or hoped for.

== Production and release ==
In October 2014, Lifetime announced plans for an additional limited series based on the network's 2014 film Lizzie Borden Took an Ax. Originally referred to as Lizzie Borden: The Fall River Chronicles, the series would take place after Lizzie's trial, with Ricci and DuVall reprising their roles as the Borden sisters. Hauser was cast as Pinkerton detective Charlie Siringo, who investigates other strange occurrences, including murders, centered around the Bordens. Stephen Kay directed the first two episodes.

A teaser trailer calling the series The Lizzie Borden Chronicles aired on December 8, 2014, during the second part of The Red Tent miniseries, promoting a 2015 premiere. It featured the tagline, "Lizzie Borden Has an Axe to Grind". The Hollywood Reporter wrote in October 2014 that the series would consist of six one-hour episodes, but by January 2015 the order was increased to eight. The Lizzie Borden Chronicles premiered on April 5, 2015. Most - if not all - of the series was shot in Nova Scotia, Canada, using period buildings and interiors in Halifax and other nearby communities.

Lifetime executive vice president and general manager Rob Sharenow said in 2014, “This series will take viewers further down Lizzie Borden’s dark path, revealing what many people suspected about her mysterious life." Entertainment Weekly reported that "while the film was inspired by real-life events, the series will take certain creative liberties, which draw from the mysterious events surrounding the deaths of those close to Borden in the years after her acquittal." Ricci said in January 2015, "It’s an imagining of what could've happened... There are no limits of behavior. There are no rules. It's the ultimate playing a fantasy." Director Kay added, "It's what would happen if you let this woman loose on a community." Neil Genzlinger of The New York Times noted that "the show mixes tidbits of actual history—there really was a Charlie Siringo, for instance—with lots of fiction and speculation, so don't take anything here seriously".

In June 2015, Lifetime opted to not produce further episodes.

The complete series was released on DVD by Sony Pictures Home Entertainment on February 2, 2016.

== Reception ==
The series has garnered mixed reviews despite high praise for Ricci's performance as Borden. Jane Borden of Vanity Fair called the series "playful, wicked brain candy", adding that "Ricci was born to play a 19th-century ax murderer, as it turns out." Keith Uhlich of The Hollywood Reporter wrote, "Christina Ricci brings us the axe! Would that her effort was worth it" and Deborah Day of TheWrap noted, "Christina Ricci kills it, but even her brand of crazy is not enough." Praising Ricci's Lizzie as "gleeful and ruthless", The New York Times called the series "period-piece television served with a wink".

== Awards and nominations ==
Year	Award	Category	Nominee	Result
2016	22nd Screen Actors Guild Awards	Outstanding Performance by a Female Actor in a Miniseries or Television Movie	Christina Ricci	Nominated
2016	1st Young Entertainer Awards	Best Supporting Young Actor - TV Movie, Mini Series or Special	Matt Tolton	Nominated
2016	59th CSC Awards	Best Cinematography in TV Drama	François Dagenais	Nominated

== See also ==
- Blood Relations
- Fall River Legend
- The Legend of Lizzie Borden
- Lizzie Borden (opera)
