= Wildflowers (film) =

1999 American drama film

- Region 1 DVD cover
- Directed by: Melissa Painter
- Written by: Melissa Painter
- Produced by: Timothy Bird; Thomas Garvin; Zachary Matz
- Starring: Clea DuVall; Daryl Hannah; Tomas Arana; Eric Roberts
- Cinematography: Paul Ryan
- Edited by: Brent White
- Music by: Sam Bisbee
- Distributed by: Fries Film Group
- Release dates: May 15, 1999 (Cannes); September 1, 2000 (U.S.)
- Running time: 98 minutes
- Country: United States
- Language: English
- Box office: $5,365 (sub total)

Wildflowers is a 1999 drama film directed by Melissa Painter and starring Clea DuVall, Daryl Hannah, Tomas Arana and Eric Roberts. It features former United States Poet Laureate Robert Hass reading some of his own poetry. Filmed in San Francisco and Marin County, California, it was given a limited theatrical release and received a mixed reception from critics.

== Premise ==
The film is a coming of age story set in 1980s Marin County and San Francisco. Clea DuVall stars as Cally, a 17-year-old who has been raised by her father, not knowing her mother. When Cally meets a mysterious woman called Sabine, she becomes obsessed with her.

== Cast ==
- Clea DuVall as Cally
- Daryl Hannah as Sabine
- Tomas Arana as Wade, Cally's Father
- Eric Roberts as Jacob, Sabine's Lover
- Richard Hillman as Graham
- Eric Yetter as Dylan
- Robert Hass as "Poet"
- John Doe as Teacher
- Sheila Tousey as Martha
- Irene Bedard as Ruby
- James Burnett as The Tailor
- David Graham as "Trip"
- Alan Gelfant as Wolf
- David Wike as Gahad
- Scott Benton as Oliver

== Distribution ==
Wildflowers premiered at the 1999 Cannes Film Festival. It was given a limited theatrical release in the United States on September 1, 2000. In the US it grossed $5,365.

== Reception ==
At the 2000 SXSW Film Festival, Melissa Painter won the SXSW Competition Award for best Narrative Feature. Review website Rotten Tomatoes gave Wildflowers a rating of 57% based on seven reviews. Metacritic gave it a "generally negative" rating of 28% based on seven reviews. In a review for The New York Times, A. O. Scott called the film dreamy and impressionistic, but ultimately empty. He praised Clea DuVall for her "intuitive grasp of emotion". Writing for The Austin Chronicle, Barry Johnson called the film poignant. He praised Painter for her "lyrical, intimate direction" and DuVall for her "impressive, nuanced performance". Christopher Null called the film bizarre and incomprehensible, "utterly hopeless as cinema".
