= David Cale =

English-American playwright, actor, and songwriter

David Cale (born David Egleton) is an English-American playwright, actor, and songwriter, best known for his solo performance works.

== Early life ==
Cale was born in England in 1958 or 1959 and grew up in the town of Luton, Bedfordshire. He failed out of secondary school. After an unsuccessful attempt to get by as a rock singer in London, he changed his name and moved to New York City in 1979—a decision that, as he later described in his play We're Only Alive for a Short Amount of Time, was motivated by violent and traumatic experiences in his youth.

His early writing began as song lyrics, which he then began to read at poetry readings, until they developed into monologues. Previously, his only experience in theater had been as a stagehand.

== Playwright and solo performer ==
In 1986, Cale made his solo stage debut at New York's PS 122 with The Redthroats, playing a semi-autobiographical character named Stephen Weird; the play won a Bessie Award and was later featured in an HBO special. After touring the play across the country, he brought it to Chicago's Goodman Theatre, beginning a long association with the Goodman, which has presented many of his stage works and commissioned several of them.

He followed this the next year with Smooch Music, opening at The Kitchen, featuring a live score by jazz musician Roy Nathanson. Nathanson also composed and performed music for Cale's next play, Deep in a Dream of You, a series of character monologues that Cale described as "the first time I've looked outside myself for material and consciously adopted a point of view other than my own onstage." Cale premiered Deep in a Dream of You at the Goodman, where it was nominated for a 1991 Joseph Jefferson Award for New Work; in New York he performed it at The Knitting Factory, where the New York Times called it "a significant breakthrough for Mr. Cale" with "surreal imagery that evokes the connection between passion and dreams with a brilliant clarity," and at The Public Theater, with these two productions collectively winning another Bessie Award.

His next collection of character sketches, Somebody Else's House, included pieces that focused on homosexuality more directly than Cale had done before, which he said came from personal experience and an interest in "showing people who don't quite fit in with the mainstream gay and lesbian community," as well as a larger theme of "people who get overlooked, who are isolated, who might fall between the cracks." One sketch, about a London woman who begins an affair with a younger man, became the basis for Cale's play Lillian, premiering at the Goodman in 1997. Lillian was broadcast on This American Life, and the 1998 New York production at Playwrights Horizons won an Obie Award Special Citation. The San Francisco Chronicle called Lillian "Cale's richest and most memorable character."

Cale's next two monologue collections, Betwixt (the first time he performed his own work alongside another actor: Cara Seymour) and A Likely Story, premiered in New York in the 2000s. He then returned to the Goodman in 2005 for his first non-monologue production, the musical Floyd and Clea Under the Western Sky, for which he wrote the book and lyrics. Cale acted the lead role, based on a character he had played in the film The Slaughter Rule. Floyd and Clea was negatively reviewed in Chicago, but in New York it was nominated for an Outer Critics Circle Award for Outstanding New Off-Broadway Musical.

Long Wharf Theatre in New Haven, Connecticut commissioned The Blue Album for its 2006–2007 season as a collaboration between Cale and New York playwright Dael Orlandersmith, with both of them playing a variety of characters that they each wrote for themselves and Cale also contributing songs.

Palomino, about an Irish immigrant working as a carriage driver in Central Park who becomes a gigolo, opened in 2010 at the Kansas City Repertory Theatre. Cale had worked as a carriage driver to research a film role. The play also toured the West Coast, to positive reviews. This was followed by The History of Kisses, which premiered at Studio Theatre (Washington, D.C.) in 2011.

His solo show Fluffing for Beginners appeared at Dixon Place in 2017. In the same year, he created Harry Clarke—the story of a Midwesterner reinventing himself as a British libertine—as a co-production between New York's Vineyard Theatre and Audible, with Audible also releasing an audiobook of the play; both the stage production and the audiobook were performed by Billy Crudup, a rare case of Cale writing monologue work for another actor. The audiobook also features Cale performing Lillian. Harry Clarke won a Lucille Lortel Award for Outstanding Solo Show.

Cale premiered We're Only Alive for a Short Amount of Time at the Goodman in 2018. He described it as his most directly autobiographical work, depicting his childhood in Luton, and said that he had avoided writing about these experiences earlier because "I didn't want people to feel sorry for me." The Chicago Tribune wrote that Cale "has been working his whole life toward this one show" and called it "deeply personal, indisputably courageous, frequently shocking and deeply moving".

Also in 2018, Cale and musician Matthew Dean Marsh began performing sketches and songs together at New York's Pangea Restaurant under the title More Songs for Charming Strangers, intending to continue this as a "monthly concert residency."

== Other acting work ==
As a stage actor, when not performing in his own plays, Cale has mostly worked in New York City. He appeared in Curtains, which received a 1996 Obie Award for the entire acting ensemble.

Cale's first screen role was in Woody Allen's Radio Days in 1987. He has since appeared in more than 20 films, as well as TV roles, including Ed Harris' 2000 biopic Pollock and James Gray's 2008 romantic drama Two Lovers.

He played John Hocknell in The Testament of Ann Lee (2025).

== Songwriter ==
Cale's original songs have been recorded by several musicians including The Jazz Passengers, Debbie Harry, and Syd Straw.

== Plays ==
- The Redthroats (1986, PS 122: New York)
- Smooch Music (1989, The Kitchen: New York)
- Deep in a Dream of You (1991, Goodman Theater: Chicago)
- Somebody Else's House (1993, Goodman Theater: Chicago; presented earlier as a "workshop" at Sushi Performance Art Gallery, San Diego)
- Lillian (1997, Goodman Theater: Chicago)
- Betwixt (2000, Theater at St. Clement's: New York)
- A Likely Story (2004, Lion Theater: New York)
- Floyd and Clea Under the Western Sky (2005, Goodman Theater: Chicago)
- The Blue Album, with Dael Orlandersmith (2007, Long Wharf Theatre: New Haven)
- Palomino (2010, Kansas City Repertory Theatre)
- The History of Kisses (2011, Studio Theatre: Washington, D.C.)
- Fluffing for Beginners (2017, Dixon Place: New York)
- Harry Clarke (2017, Vineyard Theatre: New York)
- We're Only Alive for a Short Amount of Time (2018, Goodman Theater: Chicago; 2019, The Public Theater: New York)
- Sandra (2022, Vineyard Theatre: New York)
- The Unknown (2026, Studio Seaview: New York)

== Publications ==
- The Redthroats. Vintage Books, 1989. ISBN 0679739610. Contains two plays: The Redthroats and Smooch Music.
- Shows. NoPassport Press, 2016 (available via Lulu.com). ISBN 9781329846500. Contains four plays: Deep in a Dream of You, Lillian, Palomino, and The History of Kisses.
- Harry Clarke: with Bonus Performance: Lillian (audiobook). Audible Studios, 2018. ASIN B075H1VLHX. Harry Clarke performed by Billy Crudup, Lillian performed by David Cale.
